= Boccaccio (disambiguation) =

Giovanni Boccaccio (1313–1375) was an Italian author and poet.

Boccaccio may also refer to:

- Boccaccio Boccaccino (1467–c. 1525), an Italian painter
- Boccaccio (1920 film), a 1920 Austrian film
- Boccaccio (1936 film), a 1936 German musical film
- Boccaccio (1940 film), a 1940 Italian operetta film
- Boccaccio (1972 film), a 1972 Italian comedy film
- Boccaccio '70, a 1962 film by Mario Monicelli, Federico Fellini, Luchino Visconti and Vittorio De Sica
- Boccaccio (operetta), an operetta by Franz von Suppé, first performed February 1, 1879
- Boccaccio (musical), a 1975 Broadway musical
- Boccaccio (nightclub), a Belgian nightclub in Ghent or Oostende
- Boccaccio (crater), a 135 km wide crater on Mercury at (-80,5°, 30°)
- MS al-Salam Boccaccio 98, a ferry that sank in the Red Sea in 2006
- SS Boccaccio, a cargo steamship, sunk by sabotage in 1937

== See also ==
- Bocaccio (disambiguation)
