= Rowland Leigh =

- Also known as: Rowley Leigh
- Born: Roland Henry Gordon Leigh; 16 May 1902; London, England
- Died: 8 October 1963 (aged 61) New York City, U.S.
- Genres: Musical theatre, popular
- Occupations: Lyricist, librettist

Rowland Leigh (born Roland Henry Gordon Leigh; 16 May 1902 – 8 October 1963) was an aristocratic Anglo-American lyricist, screenwriter and librettist who worked with many famous actors and musicians during his career on Broadway and in Hollywood.

== Family ==
His mother, Mable, was the youngest daughter of General William Washington Gordon and Nellie Kinzie Gordon, and he was in remainder to the peerage title of Baron Leigh, through his father the Hon Rowland Leigh (1859–1943).

Leigh married 17 November 1937 Catherine de Bernard de La Fosse, daughter of Vicomte Pierre de Bernard de La Fosse, of Château de Beaumont, Loir-et-Cher, France, but they had no children and divorced in 1943.

== Works ==
=== Filmography ===
Films
Year	Title	Role	Notes
1930	Elstree Calling		
1932	Congress Dances	adaption and lyric	lyrics to "Just Once for All Time"
1932	F.P.1	music	
1936	The Charge of the Light Brigade	screenplay	written with Michael Jacoby
1937	Tovarich	dialogue director	
1937	The Great Garrick	contributor to screenplay construction and dialogue (uncredited)	based on the play Ladies and Gentlemen by Ernest Vajda
1937	First Lady	screenplay	based on the play of the same name by George S. Kaufman and Katharine Dayton.
1938	The Adventures of Robin Hood	screenplay construction contributor (uncredited) and contributor to treatment (uncredited)	
1938	Men Are Such Fools	screenplay constructor (uncredited)	based on a Saturday Evening Post story by Faith Baldwin
1938	Secrets of an Actress	screenplay	
1940	Vigil in the Night	screenplay	based on Vigil in the Night by A. J. Cronin
1940	My Love Came Back	screenplay construction contributor (uncredited)	
1944	Knickerbocker Holiday	screenplay	based on the musical Knickerbocker Holiday by Kurt Weill and Maxwell Anderson
1944	Summer Storm	screenplay	based on the novella The Shooting Party by Anton Chekhov
1944	The Master Race	screenplay	
1945	A Song for Miss Julie	screenplay	
1946	Heartbeat	additional dialogue	
1947	Tarzan and the Huntress	screenplay/story	based on characters by Edgar Rice Burroughs
1947	Heaven Only Knows	screenplay	
1949	Siren of Atlantis	screenplay	based on the novel Atlantida by Pierre Benoît
1949	Addio Mimí!	writer	based on the novel Latin Quarter by Henri Murger

=== Stage works ===
Stage works
Year	Title	Type	Role	Notes
1930	Wonder Bar	musical comedy	lyrics and adapted libretto	music by Robert Katscher and libretto/lyrics by Géza Herczeg and Karl Farkas, translated from Die Wunder-Bar
1932	The Dubarry	operetta	lyrics and adapted libretto	music by Carl Millocker and libretto by Desmond Carter, translated from Gräfin Dubarry
1934	A Divine Moment	play	director	written by Robert Hare Powel
1934	Music Hath Charms	musical	lyrics and book	music by Rudolf Friml, lyrics and book by George Rosener and John Shubert
1937	Three Waltzes	musical	book	based on music by Johann Strauss I, Johann Strauss II, and Oscar Straus, book by Clare Kummer, based on a play by Paul Knepler and Armin Robinson
1937	You Never Know	musical	lyrics, book, and director	music by Cole Porter and Robert Katscher, lyrics by Porter and Edwin Gilbert, based on By Candlelight by Siegfried Geyer and Karl Farkas
1940	Walk With Music	musical	supervised by	music by Hoagy Carmichael, lyrics by Johnny Mercer, book by Guy Bolton, Parke Levy, and Alan Lipscott
1940	Return Engagement	play	director	written by Lawrence Riley, co-directed by Frank Merlin
1941	Night of Love	musical	lyrics and book	music by Robert Stolz, based on a play by Lili Hatvany
1941	Gabrielle	play	producer	written by Leonardo Bercovici, based on Tristan by Thomas Mann, incidental music by Rudi Revil
1948	My Romance	musical	lyrics, book, and director	music by Sigmund Romberg

== See also ==
- Baron Leigh
