= You Never Know (musical) =

1938 musical with a book by Rowland Leigh

- Sheet music cover (cropped)
- Music: Cole Porter and Robert Katscher
- Lyrics: Cole Porter
- Book: Rowland Leigh
- Basis: By Candlelight by Siegfried Geyer and Karl Farkas
- Productions: 1938 Broadway; 1973 Off-Broadway; 1991 Pasadena

You Never Know is a musical with a book by Rowland Leigh, adapted from the original European play By Candlelight, by Siegfried Geyer and Karl Farkas, with music by Cole Porter and Robert Katscher, lyrics by Cole Porter, additional lyrics by Leigh and Edwin Gilbert, directed by Leigh, and songs by others.

The show was written not long after the riding accident that left Porter semi-crippled.

== Background ==
The show was first produced in Europe with a small cast, but the Shubert Brothers (who produced it for Broadway), did not want to produce it with no chorus or large stage numbers. They hired Porter and other composers to write extra material, and when it premiered on Broadway in 1938 it was no longer a chamber musical, but a typical 1930s "big musical".

== Synopsis ==
Maria, maid to Mme. Baltin, impersonates her mistress while carrying out an assignation with the Baron de Romer's valet, Gaston, whom she believes to be the Baron himself. The Baron discovers the pair, but, being a good sport, he assumes the role of his servant in order to assist Gaston in his romantic pursuit. When Mme. Baltin discovers her maid's deceit, she is less of a good sport and exposes the masquerade. All ends happily, though, as the foursome sup by candlelight. Other characters include the Baron's gregarious friend Ida Courtney and Mme. Baltin's cheating husband, Henri, the dry goods king of France.

== Songs ==
Act I

- Overture
- I Am Gaston
- Au Revoir, Cher Baron
- By Candlelight (lyrics by Rowland Leigh; music by Robert Katscher)
- Maria
- You Never Know
- Ladies’ Room (lyrics by Edwin Gilbert and Alexander Fogarty)
- What Is That Tune?
- For No Rhyme or Reason
- From Alpha to Omega
- Don't Let It Get You Down
- What Shall I Do (lyrics by Rowland Leigh)

Act II

- Entr'acte
- Let's Put It to Music (lyrics by Edwin Gilbert and Alexander Fogarty)
- At Long Last Love
- Take Yourself a Trip (lyrics by Edwin Gilbert and Alexander Fogarty)
- Yes, Yes, Yes
- Gendarme (lyrics by Rowland Leigh and Robert Katscher)
- No (You Can't Have My Heart) (music and lyrics by Dana Suesse)
- Good Evening, Princess

Cut Songs

- I'll Black His Eyes
- I'm Yours
- What a Priceless Pleasure
- Just One Step Ahead of Love
- Ha, ha, ha
- The Cafe Society Set
- I'm Back in Circulation
- I'm Going in for Love
- It's No Laughing Matter

1991 Pasadena Song List

Act I

- Overture
- By Candlelight – Baron
- You Never Know – Baron
- Let's Not Talk About Love – Gaston
- By Candlelight (reprise) – Gaston, Baron
- By Candlelight (reprise) – Baron
- Maria – Gaston
- I'm Going In For Love – Maria
- I'm Back In Circulation – Ida
- From Alpha To Omega – Gaston, Maria
- By Candlelight (reprise) – Gaston

Act II

- Entr'acte
- What Shall I Do? – Maria, Gaston, Baron
- Let's Misbehave – Gaston, Maria
- I Happen To Be In Love – Gaston, Baron
- From Alpha To Omega (reprise) – Maria Baron

Act III

- Entr'acte
- You Never Know – Mme. Baltin
- What Is That Tune? – Baron, Mme. Baltin
- At Long Last Love – Baron
- Ridin' High – Gaston, Maria
- By Candlelight (reprise) – Baron
- Finale: You Never Know/ At Long Last Love – Company

== Original Broadway cast ==
Produced by John Shubert, the Broadway production, opened on September 21, 1938 at the Winter Garden Theatre, where it ran for 78 performances, after tryouts in New Haven, Boston, Washington, Philadelphia, Chicago, and Indianapolis, among others. The cast featured Clifton Webb, Lupe Vélez, Libby Holman, Toby Wing (later replaced by June Havoc), and Rex O'Malley.

== Later productions ==
It was staged Off-Broadway at the Eastside Playhouse from March 12 to March 18, 1973, lasting only 8 performances. The show was directed and production design by Robert Troie and musically directed by Walter Geismar. The show starred Esteban Chalbaud, Lynn Fitzpatrick, Dan Held, Rod Loomis, Grace Theveny, and Jamie Thomas. The number Greek To You, They All Fall In Love, and You've Got That Thing was added.

In 1975, there was a regional production of the show put on in Ogunquit, Maine at the Ogunquit Playhouse from August 4 to August 9. The show starred Bob Wright, Kitty Carlisle, Joe Masiell, and Bernice Massi. This production added Porter numbers from other works, including the songs After You, Who? (Gay Divorce), Greek To You (Greek To You), It Must Be Fun To Be You (cut from Mexican Hayride), Waltz Down The Aisle (Ever Yours), What A Fair Thing Is A Woman (cut from Can Can), What Does Your Servant Dream About? (cut from Kiss Me, Kate), and Who Knows? (Rosalie).

May 26, 1991 was the opening night of You Never Know at the Pasadena Playhouse in Pasadena, California. The show was directed by Paul Lazarus, musical director John McDaniel, set design James Leonard Joy, lighting design Martin Aronstein, costume design Reve Richards, sound design Jack Allaway, choreography by Thommie Walsh, and musical supervision, arrangements, and orchestrations Steve Orich. The show starred David Garrison (Gaston), Harry Groener (Baron), Kurt Knudson (Herr Baltin), Donna McKechnie (Baltin), Megan Mullally (Maria), and Angela Teek (Ida).

The Paper Mill Playhouse staged an Off-Broadway revival in 1996. The show was directed by Charles Repole, with set design by Michael Anania, costumes by Gregg Barnes, lighting by Tom Sturge, sound by David R. Paterson, music direction by John Mulcahy, and choreography by Michael Lichtefeld. The show starred Stephanie Douglas (Maria), Nancy Hess (Baltin), Tom Ligon (Herr Baltin), Michael O'Steen (Gaston), John Scherer (Baron), and KT Sullivan (Ida).

The show had a limited run from April 14–24, 2009 at the McGinn/Cazale Theatre. It was directed by Thomas Sabella-Mills, lighting design Yingzhi Zhang, musical direction by James Stenborg. The show starred James Zanelli (Baron), Kevin Kraft (Gaston), Kate Marilley (Baltin), Jennifer Evans (Maria), Christy Morton (Ida), Bill Coyne (Waiter), and Todd Faulkner (Herr Baltin).

== Critical response ==
Critical reception was generally poor for the original production, and the show closed after 78 performances and after a salary cut for the cast. Variety had noted, "a limited stay is indicated," and The New Yorker wrote, "it is sad to see so many handsome and talented people wandering helplessly around a stage." In the Times, Brooks Atkinson wrote that Clifton Webb "has a whole bookcase stacked against him...handfuls of bad jokes [and] innuendoes with the delicacy of an elephant stampede."

Sylvie Drake of the Los Angeles Times said of the 1991 production, " What we do know is that (Paul) Lazarus has created a pleasant surprise: a chamber musical that's something of a mix of Porter, Moliere and Georges Feydeau, based on an urbane drawing-room farce with a French-Viennese flavor...It is classy, intimate, happy, with terrific music and a cast of six."

Alvin Klein of the New York Times said of the 1996 Papermill show, "Theatre buffs get a kick out of making wish lists of lost musicals, ripe for revival. But not You Never Know. To see the show...is to know why a justly disregarded Cole Porter fiasco of 1938 is unlikely to survive the enlightened scrutiny – even the escapist fantasies – of modern sensibilities."

Howard Kissel of the Daily News said of the 1996 production, "The sets and costumes are gorgeous, and the tap-dancing is extremely jolly. Whatever its shortcomings, "You Never Know" gives you a wonderful sense of discovery."

Robert L. Daniels of Variety said of the 1996 production, "It is frightfully simple as staged and acted, completely lacking in wit and barren of comic inspiration, a chamber musical built on straw. What does survive, however, are the songs by Cole Porter, although the composer often publicly stated his own intense dislike of the musical, telling his biographer it was the worst show he was ever associated with...Director Charles Repole, a past master at period excavations, moves the action swiftly from song to song, but fails to harness the fun. Gregg Barnes' costumes are nothing short of divine, and Anania's set makes it all so very luscious. " He did praise KT Sullivan though, calling her "Manhattan's bright-eyed cabaret star" and goes on to say she was "Jilted by a rich beau, Sullivan whips a lethal fur boa, smashes champagne flutes and precious vases to announce that she is "Back in Circulation." It's a first act highlight, spiced by her golden pizzazz and kewpie-doll charm."

During the short season Libby Holman had a strong rivalry with the tempestuous Mexican actress Lupe Vélez. Vélez hit Holman in the face once. On another occasion, Velez urinated outside the dressing room of Holman. When Holman left the dressing room, she slipped and fell. Both women staged other scandalous events in the theater.
