= By Candlelight =

1933 film

- Theatrical release poster
- Directed by: James Whale
- Written by: Ruth Cummings; F. Hugh Herbert; Hans Kraly (adaptation); Karen DeWolf (additional dialogue)
- Based on: Candle Light by Karl Farkas and Siegfried Geyer
- Produced by: Carl Laemmle, Jr.
- Starring: Elissa Landi; Paul Lukas; Nils Asther; Dorothy Revier
- Cinematography: John J. Mescall
- Edited by: Ted Kent; David Berg (uncredited)
- Distributed by: Universal Pictures
- Release date: December 18, 1933 (United States)
- Running time: 70 minutes
- Country: United States
- Language: English

By Candlelight is a 1933 American pre-Code comedy film directed by James Whale. The film is based on the Austrian play Candle Light by Siegfried Geyer and Karl Farkas, which was adapted to the English-speaking stage by P. G. Wodehouse. The film stars Elissa Landi, Paul Lukas, Nils Asther, and Dorothy Revier. A musical version adapted by Rowland Leigh, Cole Porter, Robert Katscher and Edwin Gilbert premiered in 1938 under the title You Never Know, but was a critical and box office flop that closed after only 78 performances.

== Plot ==
During a European train journey, a nobleman's butler Josef is mistaken for his employer, Prince Alfred von Romer, by a beautiful woman, Marie, and he does nothing to disillusion her. In due course, the Prince himself arrives and, not wanting to ruin Josef's romance, poses as his servant.

== Cast ==
- Elissa Landi as Marie
- Paul Lukas as Josef
- Nils Asther as Prince Alfred von Romer
- Esther Ralston as Baroness Louise von Ballin
- Lawrence Grant as Count von Rischenheim
- Dorothy Revier as Countess von Rischenheim
- Warburton Gamble as Baron von Ballin
- Lois January as Ann (The Maid)

== Critical reception ==
The New York Times originally ran a review that called By Candlelight "a pleasantly amusing diversion. It is shallow and somewhat obvious in spots, but its little intrigue is set forth with admirable cunning by James Whale and others...The audience yesterday afternoon chuckled with glee when the Prince in brass buttons brought in the champagne, doing the butler's duties in a meticulous fashion."

In a retrospective review, Dave Kehr of The Chicago Reader described By Candlelight as "a forgotten effort by cult director James Whale" but recommended the film, arguing that "sophisticated comedy, not horror, was probably Whale’s real forte."

Jim Hoberman of The Village Voice concurred, writing that "Whale specialized in comedy as well as horror. Blithely pre-Code, By Candlelight is an upstairs-downstairs bedroom farce, predicated on class privilege and mistaken identity. Where Lubitsch might have been suave; Whale skews the action towards hysteria."

TV Guide called it a "pleasant comedy given a sparkling look by talented, classy director Whale"; while Allmovie wrote, "By Candlelight is chock full of delightfully double-entendre pre-Code dialogue and dextrous directorial touches." The Radio Times said "Universal studios' James Whale, the star director of its famous horror cycle, trespasses here on territory more generally associated with Paramount and Ernst Lubitsch. While not quite up to the rival studio's standard of sophisticated romantic comedies peopled by aristocrats, this is a more than respectably assembled film, well directed and well acted, particularly by Lukas."

== Radio adaptation ==
A one-hour radio adaptation was presented on Lux Radio Theatre on June 9, 1935, featuring Robert Montgomery and Irene Purcell.
