= L'Engle (crater) =

Crater on Mercury

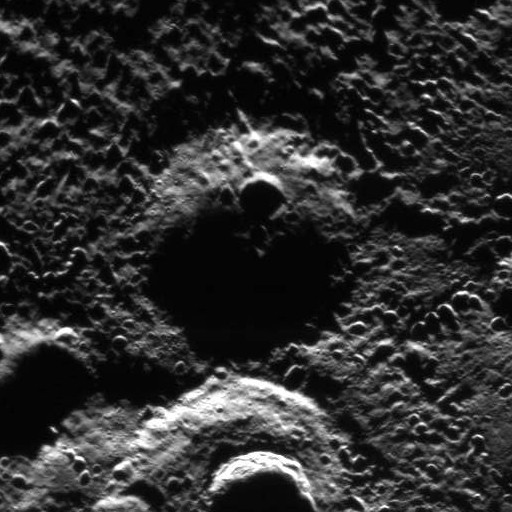
- MESSENGER NAC image
- Planet: Mercury
- Coordinates: 86.63°S 290.38°W
- Quadrangle: Bach
- Diameter: 62 km (39 mi)
- Eponym: Madeleine L'Engle

L'Engle is a crater on Mercury, located near the south pole. Its name was adopted by the International Astronomical Union (IAU) in 2013, after American author Madeleine L'Engle.

L'Engle has a crater floor that is in permanent shadow. So do nearby craters Chao Meng-Fu (at the south pole), Lovecraft, and Hurley.
