= John Diercks =

American composer (1927–2020)

- Born: 1927; Montclair, New Jersey, US
- Died: April 2020 (aged 92)
- Education: Oberlin College; Eastman School of Music; University of Rochester (PhD)
- Occupations: Composer; music teacher

John Diercks (1927 – April 2020) was an American composer born in Montclair, New Jersey, in 1927. He held degrees from Oberlin College, the Eastman School, and the University of Rochester (PhD). His composition teachers included Howard Hanson and Alan Hovhaness. For Asian music and dance he studied with Dorothy Kahananui and Halla Huhm.

Dr. Diercks taught piano at the College of Wooster (1950–54), then began a long tenure at Hollins University, teaching theory and composition. He served as department chair from 1962 until 1990.

Among many grants and awards he has received are those from the National Endowment for the Arts, the National Endowment for the Humanities, the Mellon and Danforth foundations (five times), the Southern Foundation for the Humanities, and ASCAP (fifteen times). As a composer he has enjoyed residence at the MacDowell Colony, Wolf Trap Farm, and the Virginia Center for the Creative Arts.

Much of Diercks' music is influenced by exoticism, including microtonality and "unconventional" musical sounds. An early work, Cave Music for vocalise and three players on prepared piano, accompanied a dance performed in Virginia's Dixie Caverns and broadcast on NBC-TV's Today Show.

His Twelve Sonatinas, performed by pianist Marthanne Verbit, are in the catalog of Albany Records. In 2009 The Guild of Carillonneurs in North America published his Fugue in C (for Elizabeth Graves Vitu) and Fantasia (commissioned by the University of Iowa-Ames).

Over 125 of Diercks' music has been published, for piano, voice, choral, chamber ensemble, and carillon. He has written more than two hundred reviews and articles in newspapers and journals, and authored two chapters published in the Denes Agay book "Teaching Piano".

Diercks lived in Honolulu, and served as president of the Hawaii Music Teachers Association from 1992 to 1996. Since then he has composed/arranged extensively for the Oahu Piano Quartet, and continued to compose for the carillon.

John Diercks died in April 2020 at ninety-two years old.

== Compositions ==
- Clap your hands! for voices and keyboard
- Concertino for piano and woodwind quintet
- Divertimento for woodwind quintet
- Dove of Peace, early American hymn-settings for unison voices with organ and handbells
- An Easter Triptych, three pieces for carillon
- Figures on China for horn, trombone, and tuba
- Kongai: The Soul of the Great Bell for carillon
- Moonspell for flute and piano
- Of Mountain and Valley (for the Roanoke Symphony)
- Prelude to Manvantara for carillon
- Sonata for oboe and piano
- Suite for flute and piano
- Suite for Strings for string orchestra
- Suite No. 1 for piano duet
- Suite No. 2 for orchestra
- Theme and Variations for piano
- Three Diversions for flute (alto recorder) and piano (or harpsichord)
- Toward the Summer Land for two pianos
- Twelve Sonatinas for piano
- Variations on a Flower Drum Song for two prepared pianos
- Variations on a theme of Gottschalk for tuba and piano
- Vienna: For a Time and Place for two pianos
- The Warriorʻs Ghost Returns to Play his Lute (Jeanne Larsen) for baritone and string quartet
- Woodwind Quintet
