= Roerich (crater) =

Crater on Mercury

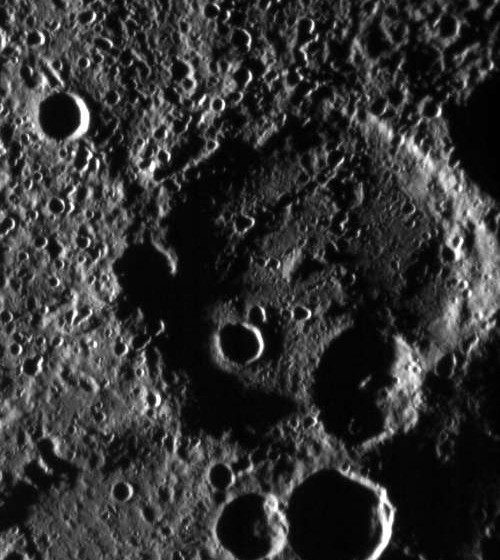
- MESSENGER image
- Planet: Mercury
- Coordinates: 84.39°S 58.94°W
- Quadrangle: Bach
- Diameter: 111.67 km (69.39 mi)
- Eponym: Nicholas Roerich

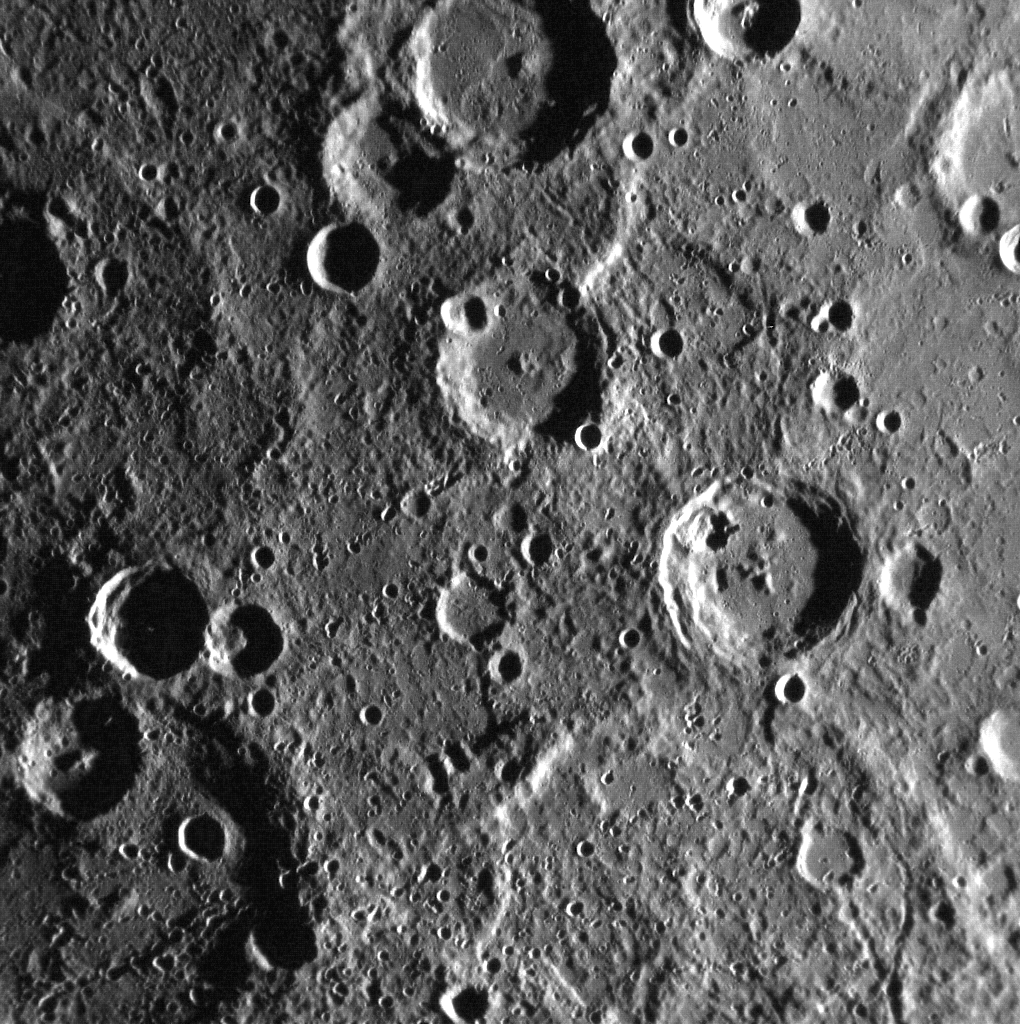
Roerich is in lower left of this MESSENGER image. Li Ch'ing-Chao is at the top, and Sadī is right of center.

Roerich is a crater on Mercury, near the south pole. Its name was adopted by the International Astronomical Union in 2013, after the Russian painter Nicholas Roerich.

Parts of Roerich crater are in permanent shadow.

To the immediate south of Roerich is Lovecraft crater. Beyond it is Chao Meng-Fu crater, at the south pole. To the northeast is Boccaccio.
