= Lovecraft (crater) =

Crater on Mercury

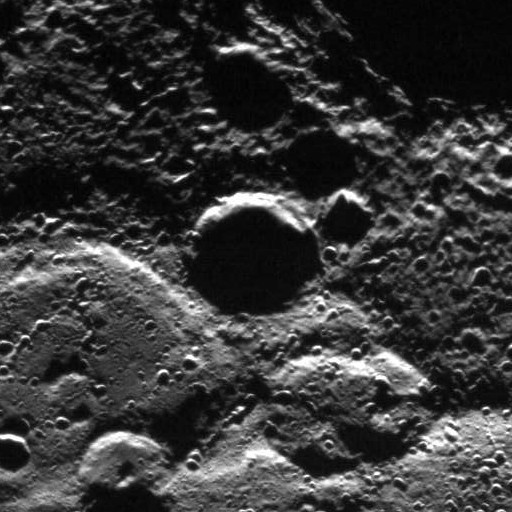
- MESSENGER NAC image of Lovecraft
- Feature type: Impact crater
- Location: Bach quadrangle, Mercury
- Coordinates: 86.24°S 73.82°W
- Diameter: 51.97 km (32.29 mi)
- Eponym: H. P. Lovecraft

Lovecraft is a crater on Mercury, located near the south pole. Its name was adopted by the International Astronomical Union (IAU) in 2013, after American author Howard Phillips Lovecraft.

Lovecraft lies on the northeast rim of Roerich crater.

Lovecraft has a crater floor that is in permanent shadow. So do nearby craters Chao Meng-Fu (at the south pole), Hurley, and L'Engle.
