= Blues in the Night =

1941 song by Harold Arlen and Johnny Mercer

Single by Woody Herman and His Orchestra
- B-side: "This Time the Dream's On Me"
- Published: September 18, 1941 by Harms, Inc., New York
- Released: October 1941
- Recorded: September 10, 1941
- Studio: Decca Studios, 5505 Melrose Avenue, Los Angeles
- Venue: from film, Blues in the Night
- Genre: Popular music, Blues
- Length: 3:14
- Label: Decca 4030
- Composer: Harold Arlen
- Lyricist: Johnny Mercer

"Blues in the Night"

Single by Dinah Shore
- B-side: "Sometimes"
- Released: January 23, 1942
- Recorded: January 12, 1942
- Studio: RCA Victor, New York City
- Length: 3:07
- Label: Bluebird 11436

"Blues in the Night" is a popular blues song which has become a pop standard and is generally considered to be part of the Great American Songbook. The music was written by Harold Arlen, the lyrics by Johnny Mercer, for a 1941 film begun with the working title Hot Nocturne, but finally released as Blues in the Night. The song is sung in the film by William Gillespie.

== Composition ==
"Blues in the Night" (1941)
African-American baritone William Gillespie's original rendition of the Arlen–Mercer composition "Blues in the Night".

Arlen and Mercer wrote the entire score for the 1941 film Blues in the Night. One requirement was for a blues song to be sung in a jail cell. As usual with Mercer, the composer wrote the music first, then Mercer wrote the words. The title "Blues in the Night" describe the narrator's romantic loneliness and frustration, recalling his mother's warning from childhood: "A woman's a two-face, a worrisome thing / Who'll leave you to sing the blues in the night".

Arlen later recalled:

The whole thing just poured out. And I knew in my guts, without even thinking what Johnny would write for a lyric, that this was strong, strong, strong! When Mercer wrote "Blues in the Night", I went over his lyric and I started to hum it over his desk. It sounded marvelous once I got to the second stanza but that first twelve was weak tea. On the third or fourth page of his work sheets I saw some lines—one of them was "My momma done tol' me, when I was in knee pants." I said, "Why don't you try that?" It was one of the very few times I've ever suggested anything like that to John.

When they finished writing the song, Mercer called a friend, singer Margaret Whiting, and asked if they could come over and play it for her. She suggested they come later because she had dinner guests—Mickey Rooney, Judy Garland, Mel Tormé, and Martha Raye. Instead, Arlen and Mercer went right over. Margaret Whiting remembered what happened then:

They came in the back door, sat down at the piano and played the score of "Blues in the Night". I remember forever the reaction. Mel got up and said, "I can't believe it." Martha couldn't say a word. Mickey Rooney said, "That's the greatest thing I've ever heard." Judy Garland said, "Play it again." We had them play it seven times. Judy and I ran to the piano to see who was going to learn it first. It was a lovely night.

After the song was composed and the lyrics were written, African-American baritone William Gillespie (1908–1968) was hired to perform the song a cappella in a film scene set in a jail cell. In his review of the film, critic Howard Thompson of The New York Times argued that Gillespie's "superbly chanted" version of the Arlen–Mercer song transformed the motion picture and arguably "nailed the film down for posterity."

== Academy Award nomination ==
In 1942, "Blues in the Night" was one of nine songs nominated for the Academy Award for Best Original Song. Observers expected that either "Blues in the Night" or "Chattanooga Choo Choo" would win, so that when "The Last Time I Saw Paris" actually won, neither its composer, Jerome Kern, nor lyricist, Oscar Hammerstein II, was present at the ceremony. Kern was so upset at winning with a song that had not been specifically written for a motion picture and that had been published and recorded before the film came out that he petitioned the Motion Picture Academy to change the rules. Since then, a nominated song has to have been written specifically for the motion picture in which it is performed.

== Critical comment ==
Composer Alec Wilder said of this song, "'Blues in the Night' is certainly a landmark in the evolution of American popular music, lyrically as well as musically."

== Recorded versions ==
=== Charting versions ===
Listed below are known versions of "Blues In the Night" that have made Billboard magazine's charts in the United States since 1941.

Recorded versions in the United Kingdom were by Shirley Bassey and Helen Shapiro.

Artie Shaw recorded the first version on September 2, 1941, for RCA Victor Records, which was released as Victor 27609 on October 3. It debuted at number 10 on Billboard magazine's "Best Selling Retail Records chart" (BS chart) on November 21, 1941, but dropped to number 21 the next week, then off.

The Woody Herman recording was released by Decca Records as catalog number 4030 in October 1941. It reached the BS chart in November, and hit number one on February 14, 1942, finishing with a 21-week chart run.

Dinah Shore's version was released by Bluebird Records as catalog number 11436 on January 23, 1942. It reached the BS chart on February 14, 1942, to start an 11 week run, peaking at number 4. It was the 27th BS record of 1942, and went on to sell one million records.

Jimmie Lunceford's two-sided platter was recorded on December 22, 1941, and released on Decca 4125 in January. Starting January 31, 1942, it ran 10 weeks on the BS chart, peaking at number 4.

The Cab Calloway recording was released by OKeh Records as catalog number 6422. It reached the BS chart on January 31, 1942, to start a nine week run, peaking at number 8.

The Benny Goodman Sextet, with Peggy Lee on vocals, recorded "Blues in the Night" on December 24, 1941, released on Okeh 6553 in January 1942. It made the chart on February 14 at number 20, but was never seen again.

The Rosemary Clooney recording was released by Columbia Records as catalog number 39813. The record first reached the Billboard magazine charts on September 26, 1952, and lasted two weeks on the chart, peaking at number 29.

=== Other notable versions ===
In addition, the song was recorded at least three times by Jo Stafford. Her previously unreleased 1942 version with the Tommy Dorsey orchestra was included in the 1966 Reader's Digest box set The Glenn Miller Years. On October 15, 1943, she recorded it with Johnny Mercer, the Pied Pipers, and Paul Weston's Orchestra, in a version released as a single (catalog number 10001) and on an album (Songs by Johnny Mercer, catalog number CD1) by Capitol Records. On February 20, 1959, she recorded it with The Starlighters in a version released on an album (Ballad of the Blues, catalog number CL-1332) by Columbia Records.

Carlos Montoya recorded a flamenco version.

=== Additional recorded versions (and further details on above versions) ===
- Frank Sinatra on Sinatra Sings For Only The Lonely (1958)
- Bobby Bland on Here's the Man! (1962)
- Arlen himself recorded the song for his 1966 album, Harold Sings Arlen (With Friend).
- Larry Adler and the John Kirby Orchestra (recorded January 20, 1944, released by Decca Records as catalog number 23524; later version of Decca 23524 released as a Larry Adler harmonica solo, both versions with the flip side "St. Louis Blues")
- Luis Arcaraz (released by RCA Victor Records as catalog number 20-4418, with the flip side "Stormy Weather")
- Louis Armstrong on Louis Armstrong Meets Oscar Peterson (1957)
- The Four Seasons (1965)
- Charlie Barnet and his orchestra (recorded October 5, 1941, released by Bluebird Records as catalog number 11327, with the flip side "Isle of Pines")
- Shirley Bassey
- Tex Beneke (as "Blues in the Night March", released by RCA Victor Records as catalog number 20-3513, with the flip side "The One Who Gets You")
- Tony Bennett on The Beat of My Heart (1957)
- Sam Butera (1964)
- Cab Calloway and his orchestra (vocal: Calloway & The Palmer Brothers) (recorded September 10, 1941, released by OKeh Records as catalog number 6422, with the flip side "Says Who? Says You, Says I")
- Eva Cassidy
- Chicago, Night & Day: Big Band, 1995
- Rosemary Clooney with Percy Faith's orchestra (recorded April 1952, released by Columbia Records as catalog number 39813, with the flip side "Who Kissed Me Last Night?", re-released as catalog number 40031, with the flip side "Tenderly")
- Bing Crosby and John Scott Trotter's Orchestra (recorded January 27, 1942, released by Decca Records as catalog number 4183A, with the flip side "Miss You"). Crosby also recorded the song in 1956 for his album Songs I Wish I Had Sung the First Time Around.
- Doris Day (released by Columbia Records as catalog number 41103, with the flip side "Teacher's Pet")
- Jula de Palma in her album Jula in jazz (1958)
- Ella Fitzgerald on Ella Swings Lightly (1958) and Ella Fitzgerald Sings the Harold Arlen Songbook (1961).
- Judy Garland and the David Rose Orchestra (1941) (released by Decca Records as catalog number 4081A, with the flip side "The End of the Rainbow")
- Benny Goodman and his Sextet (vocal: Peggy Lee & Lou McGarity) (recorded December 24, 1941, released by OKeh Records as catalog number 6553, with the flip side "Where or When", also released by Harmony Records as catalog number Ha1012, with the flip side "Bewitched")
- Bob Grant (medley recorded July 1, 1944, released by Decca Records as catalog number 24311, with the flip side "My Devotion medley")
- Buddy Guy has often incorporated parts of the song in his arrangements of classic blues songs including "I've Got A Right To Love My Woman" from the 1980 live album The Dollar Done Fell and "Cheaper To Keep Her/Blues In The Night" from the 2005 album Bring 'Em In.
- Woody Herman and his Orchestra (vocal: Woody Herman) (recorded September 10, 1941, released by Decca Records as catalog number 4030B, with the flip side "This Time the Dream's on Me" and as catalog number 25194, with the flip side "Laughing Boy Blues"; re-recorded May 7, 1947, released by Columbia Records as catalog number 37858, with the flip side "Blue Prelude")
- Harry James and his orchestra (recorded December 30, 1941, released by Columbia Records as catalog number 36500, with the flip side "All For Love")
- Quincy Jones His version was featured prominently in the Soundtrack of Ocean's Eleven (2001) – (the George Clooney Brad Pitt remake)
- Ledisi, We All Love Ella: Celebrating the First Lady of Song (2007, Verve)
- Little Milton, We're Gonna Make It (1965, Chess)
- Guy Lombardo's Royal Canadians (vocal: Kenny Gardner; recorded January 27, 1942, released by Decca Records as catalog number 4177A, with the flip side "Frankie and Johnny")
- Julie London on About the Blues (1957)
- Clyde Lucas and his orchestra (vocal: Eadie Lang) (recorded November 1941, released by Elite Records as catalog number 5010B, with the flip side "I Said No")
- Jimmie Lunceford and his Orchestra (vocal: Willie Smith; recorded December 22, 1941, in two parts, released by Decca Records as catalog number 4125A & 4125B, also released by Decca Records as catalog number 28441 both sides)
- Nellie Lutcher (released by Decca Records as catalog number 29284, with the flip side "Breezin' Along with the Breeze")
- Katie Melua (Piece by Piece, 2005)
- Johnny Mercer (released by Capitol Records as catalog number 1608, with the flip side "Candy")
- Johnny Mercer, Jo Stafford, and The Pied Pipers (recorded 1943, released by Capitol Records as catalog number 10001, with the flip side "On the Nodaway Road")

(This is the first of four records in Capitol Records' first album, Songs by Johnny Mercer.)

- Van Morrison with Georgie Fame recorded (1995) on How Long Has This Been Going On
- Art Pepper with strings, on his 1980 album Winter Moon, (recorded 3, 4 September 1980)
- Betty Reilly (released by Capitol Records as catalog number 2888, with the flip side "The Peanut Vendor")
- Helen Shapiro
- Artie Shaw and his Orchestra (vocal Hot Lips Page) (recorded September 2, 1941, released by Victor Records as catalog number 27609, with the flip side "This Time the Dream's on Me")
- Dinah Shore (recorded January 12, 1942, released by Bluebird Records as catalog number 11436, with the flip side "Sometimes", also released by RCA Victor Records as catalog number 20-1543, with the flip side "How Come You Do Me Like You Do")
- Kate Smith (recorded February 12, 1942, released by Columbia Records as catalog number 36534, with the flip side "How Do I Know It's Real?")
- Jo Stafford (1959)

== In popular culture ==
- The song was frequently quoted by composer Carl Stalling in his musical scores for the Looney Tunes and Merrie Melodies cartoons for Warner Bros. studios in the 1940s and 1950s. The then-recent hit song is sung incessantly by Daffy Duck in the ironically-titled 1942 cartoon My Favorite Duck, in which Porky Pig is tormented by the duck while on a camping trip. Porky's preferred number in that cartoon is "On Moonlight Bay". At one point, Porky unconsciously starts to sing "My Mama Done Tol' Me," then stops, looks into the camera with a "Harumph!" and returns to "Moonlight Bay".
  Additionally, the musical riff "my mama done tol' me" is used to identify a black duck from 'South' Germany in the 1942 Looney Tunes cartoon The Ducktators, and the song is featured prominently (with revised lyrics) in the 1943 Merrie Melody cartoon Fifth Column Mouse as well as in Coal Black and de Sebben Dwarfs. In the 1942 cartoon, Bugs Bunny Gets the Boid, Bugs Bunny half-mutters the song, changing the lyrics to, "My mamma done told me, a buzzard is two faced..." The melody is also heard in Porky Pig's Feat, Early to Bet, The Hypo-Chondri-Cat, and others.
- Eddie "Rochester" Anderson, would occasionally sing the beginning of the song on the Jack Benny radio program.
- In the short-lived 1979 sitcom The Last Resort, Stephanie Faracy emphatically sang it while kneading bread dough.
- In the Duck Dodgers season 2 episode, "Talent Show a Go-Go," the song is sung by the show's main antagonist Queen Tyr'ahnee, the Martian Queen.
- In The Simpsons Season 26 episode, "The Musk Who Fell to Earth," lines from the song are sung by Carl during a flashback montage.
