= Lawrence Brooks =

American actor (1912–1994)

- Born: Lawrence Huard; August 7, 1912; Westbrook, Maine, U.S.
- Died: April 15, 1994 (aged 81); Fort Lauderdale, Florida, U.S.
- Occupation(s): Actor, singer
- Years active: 1940s–1960s

Lawrence Brooks (born Huard, August 7, 1912 – April 15, 1994) was an American singer and actor.

== Biography ==
Brooks was born in Westbrook, Maine, the son of Emile and Anna Huard. He participated in musical and dramatic productions at Westbrook High School.

He was a singer and actor who had an active career performing in musicals and operettas throughout the United States during the 1940s through the 1960s.

Brooks gained early acting experience with the Portland Players.

He drew particular acclaim for his portrayal of composer Edvard Grieg in the original 1944 Broadway production of Robert Wright and George Forrest's Song of Norway. In 1948, he starred in "My Romance", taking over the role for Broadway from Charles Fredericks.

On radio, Brooks starred in Passport to Romance, a program "spiced with music and comedy", which premiered on the Mutual Broadcasting System on April 5, 1946.

He died in Fort Lauderdale, Florida, in 1994, aged 81.
