= Hurley (crater) =

Crater on Mercury

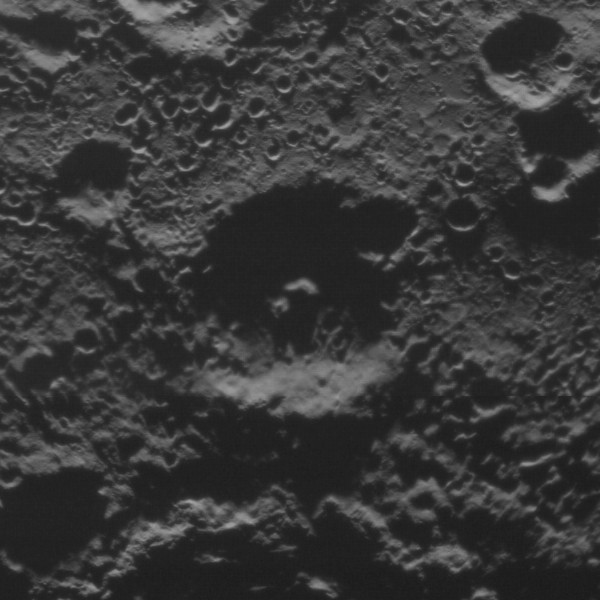
- MESSENGER NAC mosaic
- Feature type: Impact crater
- Location: Bach quadrangle, Mercury
- Coordinates: 87.36°S 6.99°W
- Diameter: 67 km (42 mi)
- Eponym: Frank Hurley

Hurley is a crater on Mercury, located near the south pole. Its name was adopted by the International Astronomical Union (IAU) in 2013, after Australian photographer Frank Hurley.

Hurley has a crater floor that is in permanent shadow. So do nearby craters Chao Meng-Fu (at the south pole), Lovecraft, and L'Engle.
