= Blues in the Night (film) =

1941 film by Anatole Litvak

- Theatrical release poster
- Directed by: Anatole Litvak
- Screenplay by: Robert Rossen
- Based on: Hot Nocturne unproduced play by Edwin Gilbert; Elia Kazan (uncredited)
- Produced by: Hal B. Wallis (executive producer)
- Starring: Priscilla Lane; Betty Field; Richard Whorf; Lloyd Nolan; Jack Carson
- Cinematography: Ernest Haller
- Edited by: Owen Marks
- Music by: Heinz Roemheld
- Production company: Warner Bros. Pictures
- Distributed by: Warner Bros. Pictures
- Release date: November 15, 1941 (United States)
- Running time: 88 minutes
- Country: United States
- Language: English

Blues in the Night is a 1941 American musical film noir directed by Anatole Litvak and starring Priscilla Lane, Richard Whorf, Betty Field, Lloyd Nolan, Elia Kazan, and Jack Carson. It was released by Warner Bros. Pictures. The project began filming with the working title Hot Nocturne, the play upon which it is based, but was eventually named after its principal musical number "Blues in the Night", which became a popular hit. The film was nominated for a Best Song Oscar for "Blues in the Night" (Music by Harold Arlen; lyrics by Johnny Mercer).

== Plot ==
While playing in a bar in St. Louis, jazz pianist Jigger Pine meets aspiring clarinetist Nickie Haroyen, who tries to convince him to put together a jazz band. After a drunk patron starts a fight, Nickie and Jigger, along with Jigger's drummer and bassist, are thrown in jail. They overhear a prisoner singing a blues song and are inspired to set out for New Orleans, where they hope to learn how to perfect an authentic bluesy sound. There they meet fast-talking trumpeter Leo and his wife, Character, who is a talented singer. Together, the quintet rides the rails, honing their technique in dive bars across the country.

One day, while sheltering in a boxcar they meet a mysterious stranger named Del, who robs them. But when they don't turn him in to the authorities, Del is so impressed by their camaraderie, he offers them a job in a New Jersey roadhouse called The Jungle. The group discovers that the roadhouse is actually owned by Del's former partners in crime - aspiring singer Kay, accomplice Sam, and her disabled sidekick Brad. Del has escaped from jail to retrieve his share of a robbery the three committed; when Kay tells him they have spent all the money, he decides to take over The Jungle and transform it into an illegal gambling club. Kay tries to rekindle her past romance with Del, but he rejects her. She turns her attention to Leo in hopes of making Del jealous.

Although the band is happy playing their brand of jazz each night at the club, Character is worried about Leo and Kay. When Jigger reveals to him that Character is pregnant, Leo decides to give up Kay. She subsequently sets her sights on Jigger, who is secretly in love with her and insists the band take her on as singer while Character is taking time off. Jigger reacts to Brad's warning that the musician should get her out of his system by saying, "I just don't think I can". Sam tries to get Kay to alert the police to Del's whereabouts. She tells Del about this, hoping that the fact that she refused to do it will win her Del's affection; instead, he orders Sam to be killed and Kay to leave The Jungle. She convinces Jigger to quit the band, go with her to New York City, and join a more commercial, mainstream jazz band.

Although successful, Jigger is unhappy in his new life, feeling he is not playing authentic jazz. Kay lives on her own terms in New York, she goes out with different men and is not interested in Jigger's career with the band. One night, he tells her he has quit and wants to go back to his friends. He wants her to go with him but she tells him the only thing she would ever want from The Jungle is Del, that she has never been in love with Jigger.

After Kay leaves him, Jigger descends into alcoholism. His friends find him and try to coax him into playing with them again. He tells them he is busy composing and has many big plans but, as he tries to demonstrate some of his music, he collapses with a mental breakdown. Everybody sticks by him, helping to nurse him back to health, though they are hiding the fact that Character's baby has died. They all return to The Jungle where Jigger plays again and rediscovers happiness.

One night, during a rainstorm, both Jigger and Del notice Kay's return. Jigger speaks with her first. When Del comes in, Kay confronts him and demands he allow her to stay; he refuses so she threatens to turn him in herself. Del pulls a gun and Jigger comes to her defense. During the ensuing fight, Del drops the gun; Kay picks it up, shoots and kills him. Jigger decides to protect Kay and help her escape from the police; he tells her to go wait for him in Del's car. The band shows up; as they angrily assail Jigger with reasons to not leave with Kay, they reveal that Character lost the baby. They compare Jigger, his emotional and mental problems, with Brad being disabled. They try to emphasize that, while Brad has no choice about his pathetic circumstances, Jigger certainly does. Brad overhears all this and joins Kay in the car, claiming that Jigger has asked him to drive her away. He takes off into the violent storm, talking about the two of them being together, and deliberately wrecks the car, killing them both.

Jigger and the band return to their life on the road, happy to be again playing their preferred version of jazz.

== Cast ==
- Richard Whorf as Jigger Pine, a talented jazz pianist
- Priscilla Lane as Ginger "Character" Powell, the band's singer
- Lloyd Nolan as Del Davis, a gangster and racketeer
- Betty Field as Kay Grant, Del's scheming former girlfriend
- Jack Carson as Leo Powell, Character's loud-mouthed, conceited husband who plays trumpet for the band
- Wallace Ford as Brad Ames, a disabled former guitar player who is hopelessly in love with Kay (credited as Wally Ford)
- Elia Kazan as Nickie Haroyen, the band's clarinetist who gave up law school for music
- Peter Whitney as Pete Bossett, the band's bassist
- Billy Halop as Peppi, the band's young drummer
- Howard Da Silva as Sam Paryas, an opportunistic member of Del's gang
- Joyce Compton as Blonde
- Herbert Heywood as the brakeman
- George Lloyd as Joe, the St. Louis cafe owner
- Charles C. Wilson as Barney
- Matt McHugh as the Drunk
- Will Osborne (singer) as bandleader Guy Heiser

Uncredited cast members (in order of appearances)

- William Gillespie as baritone singer in jail cell
- Ernest Whitman as Black Prisoner #1
- Napoleon Simpson as Black Prisoner #2
- Dudley Dickerson as Black Prisoner #3
- Anthony Warde as Del's Henchman #1
- Sol Gorss as Del's Henchman #2
- Mabel Todd as performer

== Production ==
The film began when Elia Kazan optioned an unproduced play by Edwin Gilbert called Hot Nocturne and began retooling it for Broadway. He eventually sold the rights to Warner Bros. who gave the script to Robert Rossen to complete. After initially retitling it New Orleans Blues, the studio named it after its principal musical number "Blues in the Night", which later became a popular hit. Kazan agreed to give up his screenwriting credit and appeared as a clarinetist in the film. He later remarked that after acting in the film he became convinced he could "direct better than Anatole Litzvak". James Cagney and Dennis Morgan were the studio's first two choices to play the gangster Del Davis, but the role was eventually given to Lloyd Nolan. John Garfield was cast in the role of pianist Jigger Pine who was eventually played by Richard Whorf.

== Music ==
The film's music is by Harold Arlen with lyrics by Johnny Mercer. Additional music was written by Heinz Roemheld and Ray Heindorf (only Roemheld was credited). The film features the bands of Jimmie Lunceford and Will Osborne. With the exception of Priscilla Lane none of the actors were musicians so their playing had to be dubbed by other artists. The trumpet music performed by Jack Carson's character was dubbed by Snooky Young and Frankie Zinzer while the piano music was dubbed by Stan Wrightsman. Saxophonist and clarinetist Archie Rosate played Elia Kazan's clarinet solos.

1. "Blues in the Night" (William Gillespie)
2. "This Time the Dream's on Me" (Priscilla Lane)
3. "Hang on to Your Lids, Kids" (Priscilla Lane)
4. "Says Who, Says You, Says I" (Mabel Todd)
5. "Wait Till It Happens to You" (Betty Field) (dubbed by Trudy Erwin)

== Reception ==
Blues in the Night was met with a mixed critical reception upon its release. Hollywood columnist Fred Othman named it "the worst musical of the year". Donald Kirkley of The Baltimore Sun called it "a bizarre...screen oddity" while Los Angeles Times film critic Philip K. Scheuer praised Richard Whorf's performance. It was not financially successful as its East Coast release took place shortly before the attack on Pearl Harbor.

The Chicago Tribune recommended the film: “Struck gold Yesterday! Found Richard Whorf in ‘Blues in the Night’….a slim, personable chap with tremendous appeal—and never a trace of self-consciousness. He seems completely oblivious of the camera and makes every moment he’s in a scene fairly shout with interest…..[once the opening portion is passed] From here on the film is good, red hot musical melodrama, starred with a lot of fine acting….Betty Field…You know, she always makes me think of Mae West…Same technique—only she plays straight….Wally Ford does a brilliant bit…and Priscilla Lane is her usual winsome self…And that Lloyd Nolan!....You’ll enjoy all of the music, I’m sure. This little film is well directed and moves fast.”

The film has since achieved a small cult following, including The Simpsons creator Matt Groening.

The film is recognized by American Film Institute in these lists:

- 2004: AFI's 100 Years...100 Songs:
  - "Blues in the Night" – Nominated
