= Sadī (crater) =

Crater on Mercury

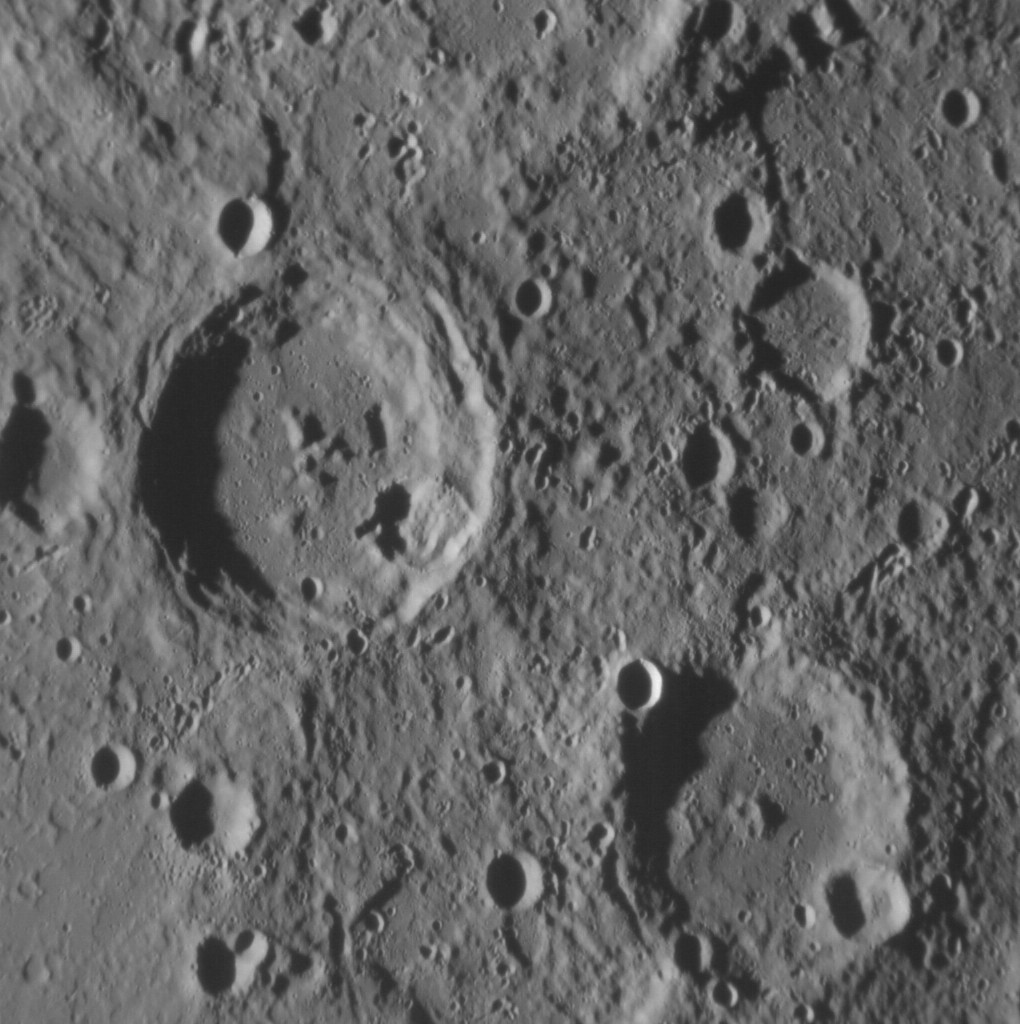
- MESSENGER NAC image. North is to the left.
- Planet: Mercury
- Coordinates: 79.24°S 51.26°W
- Quadrangle: Bach
- Diameter: 66.54 km (41.35 mi)
- Eponym: Saadi Shirazi

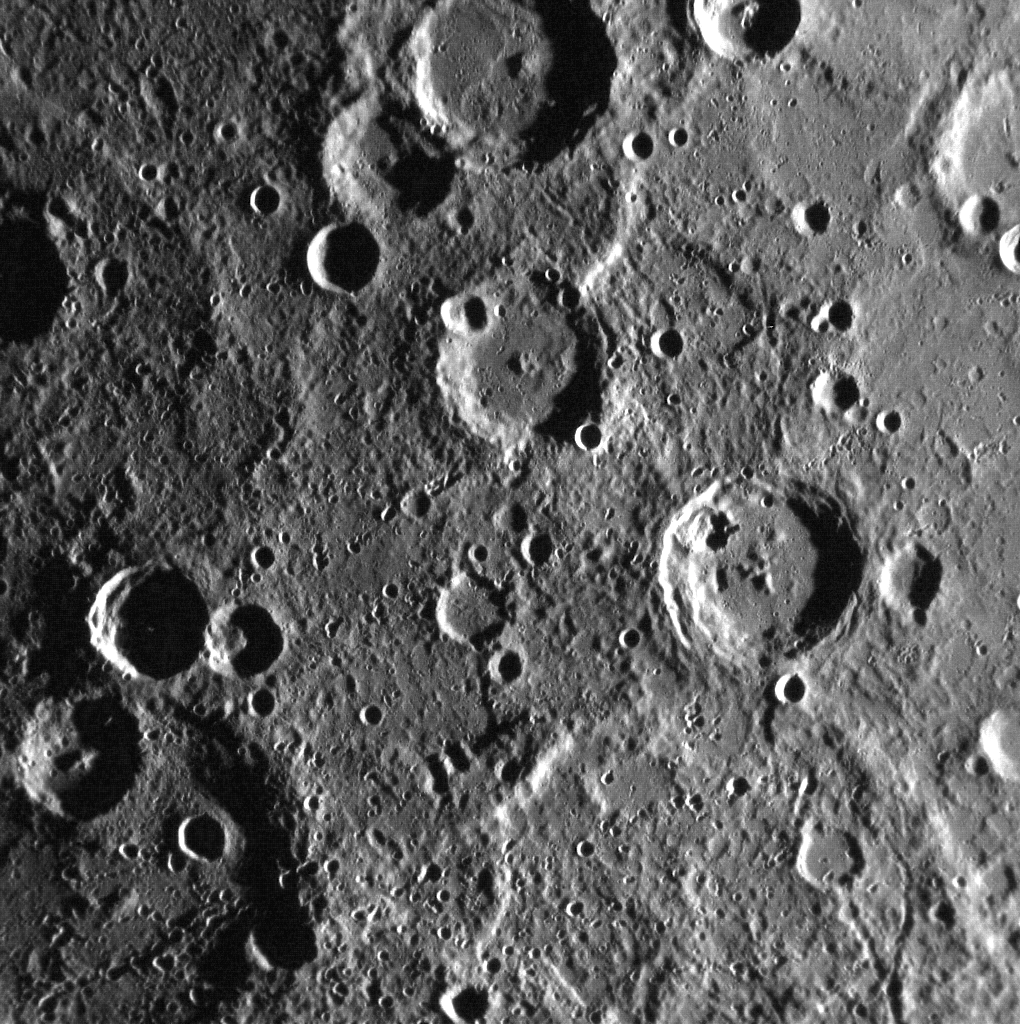
Sadī is right of center in this MESSENGER image. Li Chʻing-Chao is at top center, and Roerich is in lower left.

Sadī is a crater on Mercury. Its name was adopted by the International Astronomical Union (IAU) in 1976, after Persian poet Saadi Shirazi.

The northern rim of Sadī is in permanent shadow.

To the west of Sadī is Li Chʻing-Chao crater, to the east is Boccaccio, and to the south is Roerich.
