= The Monster and the Ape =

- Directed by: Howard Bretherton
- Written by: Royal K. Cole; Sherman L. Lowe
- Produced by: Rudolph C. Flothow
- Starring: Robert Lowery; George Macready; Ralph Morgan; Carole Mathews
- Cinematography: L. William O'Connell
- Edited by: Dwight Caldwell; Earl Turner
- Music by: Lee Zahler
- Distributed by: Columbia Pictures
- Release date: April 20, 1945
- Running time: 15 chapters 234 minutes
- Country: United States
- Language: English

The Monster and the Ape was the 26th serial released by Columbia Pictures and was released in 1945.

== Plot ==
The Monster of the title is the "Metalogen Man", a robot created by Professor Franklin Arnold. After displaying his invention, the robot is stolen by Professor Ernst with the aid of his trained ape, Thor. Ken Morgan leads the attempts to recover the stolen robot.

== Cast ==
- Robert Lowery as Ken Morgan
- George Macready as Prof. Ernst
- Ralph Morgan as Prof. Arnold
- Carole Mathews as Babs Arnold
- Willie Best as Flash, Arnold's assistant
- Jack Ingram as Dick Nordik, henchmen
- Anthony Warde as Joe Flint, henchmen
- Ted Mapes as Joe Butler, henchmen
- Eddie Parker as Blake
- Stanley Price as Mead, henchmen
- Bud Osborne as Zoo's Night Watchman
- Ray Corrigan as Thor, trained ape

== Critical reception ==
The Monster and the Ape was, in the opinion of Cline, "strikingly similar to Republic's serial Mysterious Doctor Satan." However, he describes Professor Ernst as one of "the serial form's...choicest villains."

== Chapter titles ==
1. The Mechanical Terror
2. The Edge of Doom
3. Flames of Fate
4. The Fatal Search
5. Rocks of Doom
6. A Friend in Disguise
7. A Scream in the Night
8. Death in the Dark
9. The Secret Tunnel
10. Forty Thousand Volts
11. The Mad Professor
12. Shadows of Destiny
13. The Gorilla at Large
14. His Last Flight
15. Justice Triumphs

_{Source:}
