= Carole Mathews =

American actress (1920–2014)

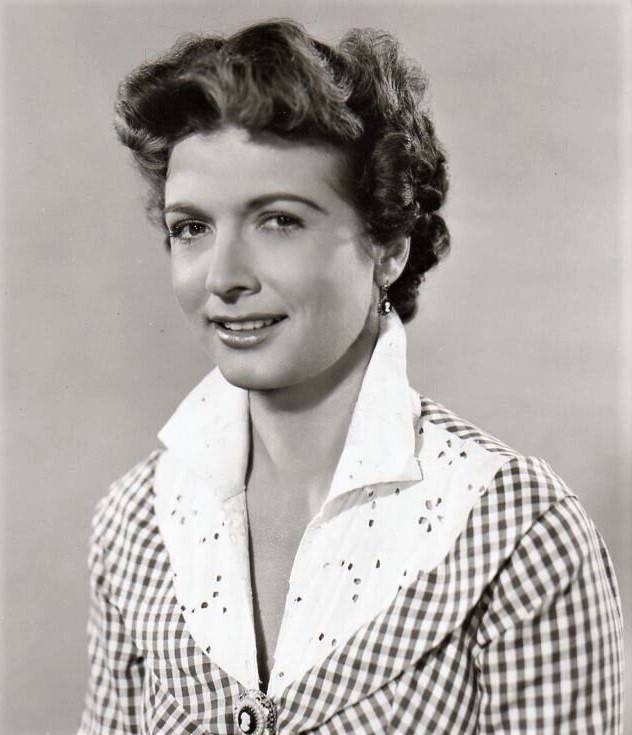
- Mathews in Treasure of Ruby Hills (1955)
- Born: Jean Deifel; September 13, 1920; Montgomery, Illinois, U.S.
- Died: November 6, 2014 (aged 94); Murrieta, California, U.S.
- Other name: Jeanne Francis
- Occupation: Actress
- Years active: c. 1940 – 1978
- Spouse: John Arthur Stockton (1942-1944) (annulled)

Carole Mathews (born Jean Deifel, also credited as Jeanne Francis; September 13, 1920 – November 6, 2014) was an American film and television actress.

== Early years ==
Born in Montgomery, Illinois, near Chicago, Mathews lived with her grandmother after her parents divorced. She attended elementary schools in Aurora, Illinois, and obtained her secondary education at Calumet High School in Chicago. After graduation from high school, she entered a nunnery in Milwaukee. Her grandmother made her leave it, however, telling her to wait until she was 21.

In 1938, Mathews was named "Miss Chicago" and in doing so, qualified for a trip to California and a screen test. While in California, she auditioned for the Earl Carroll Follies and won a role in the show for 1939.

Mathews attended the Chicago Conservatory of Music and Drama, where she studied ballet, voice, and drama. She also hosted a WGN radio program, Breakfast Time with Carole Mathews. Soon she was engaged in modeling.

== Film ==
In 1939, Mathews had some bit parts in films, using the name Jeanne Francis.

== Stage ==
Mathews appeared on Broadway as Karen Jackson in With a Silk Thread (1950).

== Filmography ==
- Tender Is the Night (1962) – Mrs. Hoyt
- Death Valley Days (1961) (Season 10, Episode 9: "A Bullet for the D.A.") – Belle Starr
- Look In Any Window (1961) – Betty Lowell
- 13 Fighting Men (1960) – Carole Prescott
- Perry Mason (1959) (Season 2, Episode 16: "The Case of the Fraudulent Photo") - Leora Matthews
- Alfred Hitchcock Presents (1958) (Season 3 Episode 14: "The Percentage") - Faye Slovak
- Tales of Wells Fargo (1958) (Season 2 Episode 34: "The Pickpocket") - Lola
- Zane Grey Theatre (1958) (Season 2 Episode 16: "This Man Must Die") - Libby (aired January 24, 1958)
- Perry Mason (1958) (Season 1, Episode 24: "The Case of the Deadly Double") - Cora Dunbar
- Showdown at Boot Hill (1958) – Jill Crane
- Million Dollar Manhunt (1957) – Hedy Bergner
- Alfred Hitchcock Presents (1956) (Season 1 Episode 32: "The Baby Sitter") - Clara Nash
- Swamp Women (1956) – Lieutenant Lee Hampton
- Betrayed Women (1955) – Kate Morrison
- Treasure of Ruby Hills (1955) – Sherry Vernon
- Port of Hell (1954) – Julie Povich
- City of Bad Men (1953) – Cynthia Castle
- Shark River (1953) – Jane Daugherty
- Meet Me at the Fair (1952) – Clara [Brink]
- Red Snow (1952) – Lieutenant Jane
- The Man with My Face (1951) – Mary Davies
- No Man of Her Own (1950) – Blonde
- Cry Murder (1950) – Norma Wayne Alden
- Paid in Full (1950) – Model
- The Accused (1949) – Waitress
- The Great Gatsby (1949) – Ella Cody
- Special Agent (1949) – Rose McCreary
- Massacre River (1949) – Laura Jordon
- Chicago Deadline (1949) – Secretary
- Amazon Quest (1949) – Teresa
- Sealed Verdict (1948) – Nurse, outspoken WAC
- Ten Cents a Dance (1945) – Marge
- Sing Me a Song of Texas (1945) – Hilda Cartwright
- A Thousand and One Nights (1945) – Handmaiden
- Blazing the Western Trail (1945) – Mary Halliday
- Outlaws of the Rockies (1945) – Jane Stuart
- I Love a Mystery (1945) – Jean Anderson
- Over 21 (1945) – Officer candidate's wife
- The Monster and the Ape (1945) – Babs Arnold
- Tahiti Nights (1944) – Betty Lou
- She's a Sweetheart (1944) – Frances
- Swing in the Saddle (1944) – Doreen Nesbitt
- Girl in the Case (1944) – Sylvia Manners
- The Missing Juror (1944) – Marcy
- Strange Affair (1944) – Gloria
- Together Again (1944) – Girl
- Dancing in Manhattan (1944) – Saleslady

== Later years ==
Mathews appeared on various television series, including ABC Stage 67 in 1967, Police Woman in 1977, and General Hospital for four episodes in 1983. She appeared in the TV Hallmark Hall of Fame movie "Fame" in 1978.

== Death ==
Mathews, at age 94, died on November 6, 2014.
