= Steve Orich =

American composer

Steve Orich aka Steven Oirich (born October 20, 1954, in Valley Stream, New York) is a composer, orchestrator and musical director.

== Professional work ==
Steve Orich was nominated for the Tony Award for Best Orchestrations in 2006 for his work on Jersey Boys which won the Tony Award for Best Musical on Broadway. The album also won the 2006 Grammy Award. He has written orchestrations for such shows as The Cher Show, Priscilla Queen of the Desert, Paint Your Wagon, 110 in the Shade and Cole Porter's You Never Know and Can-Can at the Pasadena Playhouse and the Paper Mill Playhouse as well as Stephen Schwartz's Snapshots.

As a composer, he has scored television series and specials including ACE Award-winning documentaries Mo' Funny for HBO and All About Bette Davis for TNT, Bob Hope . . . Laughing with the Presidents for NBC, and the PBS/Lifetime documentary Jackie Onassis: An Intimate Portrait. Other television shows he has worked on include A Very Brady Christmas, The Bradys, Mucha Lucha, and I Love Lucy's 50th Anniversary Special. He is also an occasional arranger for American Idol.

He has orchestrated and conducted albums for artists including Helen Reddy, Judy Kaye, Debbie Gravitte, Petula Clark and Deborah Gibson. At the Pasadena Playhouse, he has conducted productions of 110 in the Shade, Do I Hear a Waltz? in 2001 and A Class Act, as well as the International Tour of A Class Act in Tokyo. Recently, he orchestrated and conducted Michael Feinstein's Great American Songbook at the Mark Taper Forum and was Vocal Director for Leonard Bernstein's Mass at the Hollywood Bowl. He orchestrated Tommy Tune's new musical, Turn of the Century at the Goodman Theatre (Chicago), Noah Racey's Pulse, Josephine and Beatsville at the Asolo Repertory Theatre. He also wrote new orchestrations for Camelot which has had productions around the world. Most recently, he was Music Supervisor, Arranger and Orchestrator for Romeo and Bernadette.

His orchestrations have been performed by the Boston Pops, at Carnegie Hall, the Kennedy Center, and the White House.

== Stage ==
Year	Title	Role	Venue
1977	New York City Street Show	Composer	Regional — The Actors' Playhouse
1978	Approaching Zero	Composer (credited as Steven Oirich)	Regional — La MaMa E.T.C.
1979	Potholes	Music Director	Off-Broadway — Cherry Lane Theatre
1982	Snoopy, The Musical	Replacement Music Director	Off-Broadway — The Lamb's Theatre
1982	You Never Know (musical)	Music Supervision, Orchestrations, and Arrangements	Regional — Goodspeed Opera House
1991	You Never Know (musical)	Music Supervision, Orchestrations, and Arrangements	Regional — Pasadena Playhouse
1992	David's Mother	Composer	Regional — Pasadena Playhouse
1998	Dogmusic (world premiere)	Additional Orchestrations	Regional — Theatre West
1999	Both Barrels	Orchestrations, Music Director	Regional — Goodspeed Musicals at The Norma Terris Theatre
1999	A Good Swift Kick	Musical Supervisor, Orchestrations	Off-Broadway — Variety Arts Theatre
2001	Do I Hear A Waltz?	Music Director	Regional — Pasadena Playhouse
2001	You Never Know	Musical Arrangements and Orchestrations	Regional — McGaw YMCA Childcare Center Auditorium
2002	A Class Act	Music Director	Regional — Pasadena Playhouse
2002	Actor, Lawyer, Indian Chief	Music Supervisor and Orchestrations	Regional — Goodspeed Musicals at The Norma Terris Theatre
2004	Jersey Boys	Orchestrations	Regional — La Jolla Playhouse Mandell Weiss Forum
2004	Paint Your Wagon	Conductor, Music Director, Musical Arrangements, Orchestrations, Keyboards, Concertina	Regional — Geffen Playhouse Main Stage
2005–2017	Jersey Boys	Orchestrations	Broadway — August Wilson Theatre
2007	Snapshots	Orchestrations	Regional — The Loft Theatre
2008	Snapshots	Orchestrations	Regional — Mountain View Center for the Performing Arts
2008–2010	Jersey Boys	Orchestrations	Regional — Toronto Centre for the Arts
2008	Turn of the Century (world premiere)	Orchestrations	Regional — Goodman Theatre (Albert Ivar Goodman Theatre)
2009	You Never Know (concert staging)	Additional Musical Arrangements	Off-Broadway — McGinn/Cazale Theatre
2010	A Christmas Memory	Orchestrations	Regional — The Lucie Stern Theatre
2010	A Funny Thing Happened on the Way to the Forum	Music Director	Regional — Freud Playhouse at UCLA
2011	Gigi	Music Director	Regional — Freud Playhouse at UCLA
2011	Snapshots	Orchestrations, Music Director	Regional — North Shore Center for the Performing Arts
2013	Pulse	Orchestrations	Regional — The Mertz Theatre
2013	Snapshots	Musical Arrangements and Orchestrations	Regional — Goodspeed Musicals at The Norma Terris Theatre
2014	Can-Can	Music Director / Conductor	Regional — Paper Mill Playhouse
2014–2015	A Christmas Memory	Orchestrations	Off-Broadway — DR2 Theatre
2014	Camelot	Music Director, Orchestrations	Regional — Two River Theater Company Joan and Robert Rechnitz Theater
2015–2016	Snapshots	Orchestrations and Arrangements	Regional — Francis J. Gaudette Theatre; Everett Performing Arts Center; Temple of Music and Art Alice Holsclaw Theatre; and others
2016	Josephine	Music Supervision, Orchestrations, and Arrangements	Regional — The Mertz Theatre
2016	West Side Story	Music Director	Regional — Paper Mill Playhouse
2016	Camelot	Orchestrations	Regional — Westport Country Playhouse
2017	Beatsville	Orchestrations	Regional — Historic Asolo Theatre
2017	Ragtime	Music Director, Orchestrations	Regional — 5th Avenue Theatre; The Mertz Theatre
2017	Jersey Boys	Orchestrations	Off-Broadway — New World Stages
2018	The Cher Show	Orchestrations	Broadway — Neil Simon Theatre
2018	The Music Man	Additional Arrangements, Music Director	Regional — The Mertz Theatre
2020	Romeo & Bernadette: A Musical Tale of Verona and Brooklyn	Musical Supervision, Arrangements, Orchestrations	Regional — A.R.T./New York Theatres
2021	Camelot	Concert Staging	Regional — Asolo Repertory Theatre Terrace Stage
2021	New Orchestrations	Regional — MusicalFare Theatre	
2021	A Turtle On A Fence Post	Musical Arrangements and Orchestrations	Regional — Theater 555
2021	Jersey Boys	Orchestrations	UK and Ireland Tour
2021	Romeo & Bernadette: A Musical Tale of Verona and Brooklyn	Musical Supervision and Arrangements, Orchestrations	Regional — Theater 555
2022	Camelot	Orchestrations / Arrangements	Regional — The Muny
