= Passport to Romance (radio series) =

American radio series (1946)

Passport to Romance is an American radio series that was broadcast on the Mutual Broadcasting System beginning on April 5, 1946. The trade publication Variety described it as a "musical romance with current Broadway stars".

== Overview ==
Nancy (portrayed by Mitzi Green) and Chuck (Larry Brooks) were singing stewards on the ship S. S. Harmonia on Passport to Romance. Presenting "musical comedy written primarily for the microphone", episodes contained approximately equal parts of music and plot. Situations that the main characters encountered contained elements that were typical of musical comedies in other formats — "the misunderstandings, the moments of despair, and the inevitably joyous climax coming in the form of the duet at the curtain". Eddie Nugent was also heard on the program. Don Frederick was the announcer. Adventures experienced by Nancy and Chuck included being taken prisoner when a group of pirates captured their ship.

== Production ==
Stanley Kauffman was the producer, director and writer. Sylvan Levin directed the orchestra. Passport to Romance replaced The Human Adventure on Friday nights from 8 to 8:30 p.m. Eastern Time. Its competition included Woody Herman's orchestra on ABC, The Aldrich Family on CBS, and Highways in Melody on NBC. The program was sustaining.

== Critical response ==
Jack Gould wrote in a review in The New York Times that the musical-comedy format had seldom been used on radio and that it offered a lot of potential. Gould complimented Brooks's "relaxed and warm baritone voice", adding that his delivery "is winningly straightforward and devoid of the artifices of the purely radio crooner." He pointed out that Brooks was the strength of the show, adding that Green had a "rather limited range" and tended to talk through a song more than sing it. He added, however, that a better selection of songs might help her performances.

A review of the premiere episode in Variety noted the time that was devoted to story development at the expense of music. It pointed out that Green's first full song came 15 minutes after the episode began, and Brooks had to wait eight more minutes for "his real chance". The review questioned why Broadway stars were used rather than "real radio actors", but it acknowledged that Green and Brooks did well. It added that the orchestral background music had a positive effect.
