= Treasure of Ruby Hills =

1955 film by Frank McDonald

- Theatrical release poster
- Directed by: Frank McDonald
- Written by: Tom Hubbard; Fred Eggers
- Based on: "The Rider of the Ruby Hills" by Louis L'Amour
- Produced by: William F. Broidy
- Starring: Zachary Scott; Carole Mathews; Barton MacLane; Dick Foran; Lola Albright
- Cinematography: John J. Martin
- Edited by: Ace Herman
- Music by: Edward J. Kay
- Production company: William F. Broidy Productions
- Distributed by: Allied Artists
- Release date: January 23, 1955 (United States)
- Running time: 71 minutes
- Country: United States
- Language: English

Treasure of Ruby Hills is a 1955 American black-and-white Western film directed by Frank McDonald and starring Zachary Scott, Carole Mathews, Barton MacLane, Dick Foran, and Lola Albright. The film is based on the story "The Rider of the Ruby Hills" by Louis L'Amour. He wrote the story under the pen-name Jim Mayo; the story was later expanded as the novel Where the Long Grass Blows in 1976.

== Plot ==
The film is set in 1877 in Arlington. In the government-owned Ruby Hills Valley all the small landowners and ranchers are dispossessed of their property by two wealthy breeders, Chalk Reynolds and Walt Payne, who continue to wage war for total control of the area. Hills. Their henchmen do not hesitate to kill others to establish the supremacy of their leaders. Their war is turned upside down by the arrival of Ross Hayne, the son of a famous outlaw, who legally acquired part of the area with the only source of water capable of supplying the valley. When Hayne's partner is shot by Reynolds' henchman, Hayne goes to Ruby Hills for revenge. He discovers that a third man, Alan Doran, intends to take control of the place after the death of the two clans who are supposed to destroy each other. Hayne becomes involved in a deadly fight for land and water.

== Cast ==
- Zachary Scott as Ross Haney
- Carole Mathews as Sherry Vernon
- Barton MacLane as 'Chalk' Reynolds
- Dick Foran as Alan Doran
- Lola Albright as May
- Gordon Jones as Jack Voyle
- Raymond Hatton as Westbrook 'Scotty' Scott
- Lee Van Cleef as Frank Emmett
- Steve Darrell as Tom Hull
- Charles Fredericks as Walt Payne
