= Bocaccio =

The bocaccio rockfish is a variety of fish found on the western coast of the United States and Canada.

Bocaccio may also refer to:

- USS Charr (SS-328), originally designated as Bocaccio

== See also ==
- Giovanni Boccaccio
- Boccaccio (disambiguation)
