= The Challenge (1970 film) =

1970 American television film

- Genre: Action; Drama; Thriller; War
- Written by: Marc Norman
- Directed by: George McCowan (Note: Credited as Alan Smithee.)
- Starring: Darren McGavin; Mako
- Music by: Harry Geller
- Country of origin: United States
- Original language: English

Production
- Producers: Jay Cipes; Ed Palmer
- Cinematography: John M. Nickolaus Jr.
- Editors: Joseph Gluck; Stanford Tischler
- Running time: 74 minutes
- Production company: 20th Century Fox Television

Original release
- Network: ABC
- Release: February 10, 1970

The Challenge is a 1970 made-for-television movie war film starring Darren McGavin and Mako. Director George McCowan chose to hide his involvement by using the pseudonym Alan Smithee (spelled Allen Smithee in the credits). This was the last film appearance of Paul Lukas.

== Plot ==
An American orbital weapons platform crashes in an uninhabited area of the Pacific. An unnamed Asian country arrives first, but US naval forces block their escape from the area. The platform would allow any country to threaten the US from space. While the US has an overwhelming advantage in force, the country is allied with China, which the US does not want to aggravate. The Chinese government does not want to enter a full-scale war, but neither do they want to lose face. They agree to settle the matter with a "surrogate" war, fought by a single representative of each country. General Lewis Meyers is opposed to the proposal as he believes US forces can crush its adversaries.

American agents track down and bring back Jacob Gallery from a Latin American country, where he is a guide on a big game hunt. Meyers is familiar with Gallery, who was court-martialed during the Vietnam War for hunting Viet Cong sentries at night and keeping trophies of his kills. During one such unauthorized nightly expedition, his unit was wiped out while he was hunting alone. Meyers wants to send Bryant, a Marine captain who respects authority, but the Secretary wants to send someone whose disregard for rules and procedures is more likely to produce victory.

A small tropical island is selected for the battle, its inhabitants relocated to Guam. Gallery reluctantly agrees to the assignment after demanding $1 million in advance. He is put through a training program and given a selection of weapons, including a pair of Madsen submachine guns bolted together that fires regular ammunition and birdshot rounds. He is warned that the greatest threat on the island is fungi, which can quickly infect any wound. A former resident of the island advises Gallery on where to find fresh water.

Gallery is sent on his way from a surfaced submarine at the same time his adversary is sent. After his first encounter with Yuro, he sets up his base inside a hidden cave. He begins polluting the water sources, forcing Yuro to the last one. When Yuro goes to the pond, Gallery ambushes him. Yuro escapes, but not before being wounded. Gallery discovers Yuro's treetop base and booby traps it with a grenade. But Yuro had set razor blades in the tree trunk, one of which cuts Gallery's leg.

On the submarine, Meyers arrives and unveils his plan to secretly send in Bryant since Gallery has not been successful after four days.

In the now-abandoned village, a feverish Gallery sets traps, but Yuro gets the drop on him. Gallery barely escapes and makes his way to the beach with Yuro in pursuit. Hearing his name, he peeks around rocks to see Bryant holding Yuro at gunpoint. Bryant tells Gallery to kill Yuro and be a hero, but a disgusted Gallery shoots Bryant instead. Yuro runs off.

Making his way back to his cave, Gallery comes upon one of Yuro's countrymen, hanging dead in one of Yuro's tree snares, signaling betrayal from both countries. Resting in his cave, he hears Yuro beseeching him to forsake the treacherous country that sent a second man against the rules. Yuro offers to save Gallery from his festering wound, but is pointing his gun at the cave. Gallery empties his magazine into the greenery, killing Yuro. He takes out his transmitter to proclaim victory, but decides against it, throwing it away before succumbing to his infection.

== Cast ==
- Darren McGavin as Jacob Gallery
- Broderick Crawford as Gen. Lewis Meyers
- Mako as Yuro
- James Whitmore as Overman
- Skip Homeier as Lyman George
- Paul Lukas as Dr. Nagy
- Sam Elliott as Bryant, Gallery's unwanted help
- Adolph Caesar as Clarence Opano
- Andre Philippe as Swiss official
- Arianne Ulmer as Sarah (as Arianhe Ulmer)

== Production ==
This made-for-television film was made at the height of the Vietnam war. Critic Steven Puchalski suggests the film was an allegory for that conflict. The original director, Joseph Sargent, left the production after conflicts with the producer during editing. George McCowan took over the direction. Says Puchalski, "it's hard to understand why [he decided to use the Allen Smithee pseudonym] in this case, since The Challenge is actually a tightly-wound lesson about the stupidity and futility of warfare."

== See also ==
- List of American films of 1970
