= Egon Neumann =

Austrian composer

Egon Neumann (21 July 1894 – 1948) was an Austrian composer and Kapellmeister.

== Life ==
Born in Mödling, Austria-Hungary, Neumann, whose father was a lawyer, studied musicology at the University of Vienna with Guido Adler from 1913. (Dr. phil. 1919), then worked as a bandmaster at the Moravian Ostrava in 1920, at the Neues Operettenhaus Berlin in 1921, at the Central Theater Berlin in 1922, and was an entertainers' composer. From 1920 to 1928, at the Bürgertheater as Kapellmeister, where he conducted the premiere of his operetta Donauweibchen. He later lived in Berlin, 1932–1934 again in Vienna, then in Paris. On New Year's Eve 1939/1940 he took part in the revue Meslay lacht wieder organised by Karl Farkas. He fled to Mexico via France in 1938. The diplomat Gilberto Bosques helped him. In Mexico, he acted as pianist and composer in the "Heinrich Heine Club" until its dissolution in 1946 and staged a joint revue with Hugo Wiener and Cissy Kraner.

Like Marcel Rubin, he was an active member of the ARAM (Acción Republikana Austriaca de Méxiko), an independent movement of Austrians Abroad.

Neumann committed suicide in Mexico City.
