= Tender Is the Night (film) =

1962 film directed by Henry King

- Original lobby card
- Directed by: Henry King
- Screenplay by: Ivan Moffat
- Based on: The 1934 novel by F. Scott Fitzgerald
- Produced by: Henry T. Weinstein
- Starring: Jennifer Jones; Jason Robards, Jr. Joan Fontaine; Tom Ewell; Cesare Danova; Jill St. John; Paul Lukas
- Cinematography: Leon Shamroy, A.S.C.
- Edited by: William Reynolds, A.C.E.
- Music by: Bernard Herrmann
- Distributed by: 20th Century Fox
- Release date: January 19, 1962
- Running time: 142 minutes (132 minutes - FMC Library Print)
- Country: United States
- Language: English
- Budget: $3.9 million
- Box office: $1.25 million (US/ Canada)

Tender Is the Night is a 1962 American film directed by Henry King and starring Jennifer Jones and Jason Robards, Jr. King's last film, it is based on the 1934 novel of the same name by F. Scott Fitzgerald.

The soundtrack featured a song, also called "Tender Is the Night", by Sammy Fain (music) and Paul Francis Webster (lyrics), which was nominated for the 1962 Academy Award for Best Song. Robards won the 1962 NBR Award for his performances in Tender Is the Night and Long Day's Journey Into Night.

King's previous film had been Beloved Infidel, a biographical drama about Fitzgerald, author of Tender Is the Night.

There are interesting backstage anecdotes about pre-production in Memo from David O. Selznick, an edited collection of the iconic producer's letters and notes. Selznick's then-wife was sought and cast as the film's lead, and his letters reflect insight into the casting process (Jane Fonda had wanted to play Rosemary; William Holden, Henry Fonda and Christopher Plummer were considered for Dick), the creative angst around the project, and Selznick's own clever insights into the source novel and its requirements to become a successful film property.

== Plot summary ==
"The French Riviera _ _ in the Twenties": while at a party in the south of France, Nicole Diver, a woman with many emotional issues, sees her husband, Dr. Dick Diver, take an interest in an American movie starlet, Rosemary Hoyt. Jealousy gets the better of Nicole.

The story flashes back to how Dick and Nicole met. He was a distinguished psychiatrist who made the classic mistake of falling in love with a patient, Nicole Warren. He marries her despite warnings from his mentor, Dr. Dohmler, that it will ruin Dick's career.

Dick spends the next years of his life abandoning his work to indulge wife Nicole's many whims, leading a hedonistic life, paid for by Nicole's sophisticated sister, Baby. By the time he realizes the error of his ways and attempts to resume his career, it is Nicole who has found a new lover, and she wants a divorce.

== Cast ==
- Jennifer Jones as Nicole Diver
- Jason Robards, Jr. as Dick Diver
- Joan Fontaine as Baby Warren
- Tom Ewell as Abe North
- Cesare Danova as Tommy Barban
- Jill St. John as Rosemary Hoyt
- Paul Lukas as Doctor Dohmler
- Bea Benaderet as Mrs. McKisco
- Charles Fredericks as Mr. McKisco
- Sanford Meisner as Doctor Gregorovious
- Mac McWhorter as Colis Clay
- Albert Carrier as Louis
- Richard de Combray as Francisco
- Carole Mathews as Mrs. Hoyt
- Alan Napier as Pardo
- Leslie Farrell as Topsy Diver
- Michael Crisalli as Lanier Diver
- Earl Grant as Piano Player
- Maurice Dallimore as Sir Charles Golding
- Tom Hernandez as Nobleman
- Renee Godfrey as Nurse
- Jean De Briac as Dr. Faurore
- Orrin Tucker as Orchestra leader
- Aladdin as Violinist
- John Richardson as Young man being photographed
- Carl Princi as Assistant manager

== Production ==
Henry King said he had been offered the project ten years earlier but "turned it down. I thought it was obnoxious, I thought it was the worst subject matter. The story of Tender is the Night is about a man who seduces his twelve-year-old daughter. That's really a degenerate part." However the director was pleased by the changes Ivan Moffat made in his adaptation and agreed to take the job. He says the problems begin when they had trouble casting the film "and unfortunately Selznick wanted Jennifer Jones to play it. When it came to me, I didn't know that Selznick had anything to do with it. Selznick is an extremely talented man and can produce a picture every twenty-four hours. We were good friends, but our personalities were such that we would clash if we started to work together."

=== Postproduction ===
King says when he finished the film he "wanted to do a little last minute editing." However Buddy Adler, the head of the studio, had died and was replaced by Robert Goldstein, who refused to let King make the changes. According to King, "there were just little things wrong, that put the emphasis on the wrong place, on the wrong person. I couldn't go over his head. I couldn't steal the picture and cut it myself. It was a mediocre picture that could have been an excellent picture... If they had allowed me to eliminate those scenes that shouldn't have been in there, Jennifer Jones would not only have been nominated for the Academy Award, she would have won it. She gave a terrific performance."

== Soundtracks ==
The film score was composed by Bernard Herrmann. Soundtracks included the main theme "Tender Is the Night" composed by Sammy Fain with lyrics by Paul Francis Webster (above). This song was played in the film by pianist George Greeley (uncredited). Other songs were:

- "Five Foot Two, Eyes of Blue" (Has Anybody Seen My Girl?), composed by Ray Henderson, lyrics by Sam Lewis and Joe Young
- "Charleston", composed by James P. Johnson
- "Auld Lang Syne", traditional music: lyrics by Robert Burns, lyrics by Andreas Frege
- "Honey", music by Richard A. Whiting, lyrics by Seymour Simons & Haven Gillespie
- "Jeannine, I Dream of Lilac Time", composed by Nathaniel Shilkret, lyrics by L. Wolfe Gilbert
- "I Love You", composed by Harry Archer
- "How Am I To Know", composed by Jack King, lyrics by Dorothy Parker
- (I've Grown So Lonesome) "Thinking of You" composed by Walter Donaldson and Paul Ash
- "I Never Knew" composed by Tom Pitts, Raymond B. Egan and Roy Marsh
- "Charmaine" composed by Erno Rapee, lyrics by Lew Pollack

== Reception ==
Variety wrote:

A combination of attractive, intelligent performances and consistently interesting, De Luxecolorful photography of interiors and exteriors – mostly the French Riviera – provide big plus qualities in this 20th-Fox adaptation of Tender Is The Night. This may not be a 100 proof distillation of F. Scott Fitzgerald. But Tender Is The Night is nonetheless on its own filmic terms a thoughtful, disturbing and at times absorbing romantic drama...

Jones emerges a crisply fresh, intriguing personality and creates a striking character as the schizophrenic Nicole. Robards, whose non-matinee-idol masculinity makes him an ideal choice for the role of the ill-fated doctor-husband, Dick Diver, plays with intelligence and conviction. Joan Fontaine is convincing as Nicole’s shallow, older sister, performing with the right manifestation of frivolity and bite that her part requires.

Nathan Weiss, a Fox publicity man, wrote in his published correspondence, "Is is so awful. Can Henry King have read the book" Don't they know this isn't Fannie Hurst, man, this is Scott Fitzgerald?"

== See also ==
- List of American films of 1962
