= Port of Hell =

1954 film

- Theatrical release poster
- Directed by: Harold D. Schuster
- Screenplay by: Tom Hubbard; Fred Eggers; Gil Doud
- Story by: Gil Doud; D.D. Beauchamp
- Produced by: William F. Broidy
- Starring: Dane Clark; Carole Mathews; Wayne Morris; Marshall Thompson; Marjorie Lord; Harold Peary
- Cinematography: John J. Martin
- Edited by: Ace Herman
- Production company: William F. Broidy Productions
- Distributed by: Allied Artists Pictures
- Release date: December 5, 1954
- Running time: 80 minutes
- Country: United States
- Language: English

Port of Hell is a 1954 American drama film directed by Harold D. Schuster and written by Tom Hubbard, Fred Eggers and Gil Doud. The film stars Dane Clark, Carole Mathews, Wayne Morris, Marshall Thompson, Marjorie Lord and Harold Peary. The film was released on December 5, 1954, by Allied Artists Pictures.

== Cast ==
- Dane Clark as Gibson Pardee
- Carole Mathews as Julie Povich
- Wayne Morris as Stanley Povich
- Marshall Thompson as Marsh Walker
- Marjorie Lord as Kay Walker
- Harold Peary as Leo
- Otto Waldis as Snyder
- Tom Hubbard as Nick
- Charles Fredericks as 'Sparks' Reynolds
- James Alexander as Parker
- Victor Sen Yung as Detonation Ship Radioman
