= My Romance (musical) =

- Poster
- Music: Sigmund Romberg
- Lyrics: Rowland Leigh
- Book: Rowland Leigh

My Romance is a musical comedy in three acts with book and lyrics by Rowland Leigh, and music by Sigmund Romberg. It was produced on Broadway in 1948.

== Production ==
This show originally started out with music by Denes Agay and lyrics by Rowland Leigh. After try-outs in Boston, in Philadelphia at the Forrest Theatre, and elsewhere, the show folded. It was revived with a new score by the famous Sigmund Romberg, and with Lawrence Brooks replacing Charles Fredericks. My Romance premiered on Broadway at the Shubert Theatre on October 19, 1948, and then transferred to the Adelphi Theatre, closing on January 8, 1949, for a total run of 95 performances.

It was produced by Messrs. Lee and J. J. Shubert. The show was based on “Romance,” the 1913 play by Edward Sheldon. It was staged by Mr. Leigh and choreographed by Fredric N. Kelly. The scenic design was by Watson Barratt and the costume design was by Lou Eisle. The music by orchestrated by Don Walker and the musical director was Roland Fiore.

The cast starred Anne Jeffreys as Mme. Marguerita Cavallini, and Lawrence Brooks as Bishop Armstrong,

== Synopsis ==
“My Romance” told the story of a minister who fell in love with an opera diva. Edward Brewster Sheldon, who died in 1946 at the age of 60, wrote this sentimental drama in 1913 and it made the actress Doris Keane a memorable figure in American theatre.

== Songs ==
Act 1

- “Souvenir”
- “1898”
- “Debutante”
- “Written in Your Hand”
- “Millefleurs”
- “Love and Laughter”
- “From Now Onward”
- “Little Emmaline”

Act 2

- “Desire”
- “Polka”
- “If Only”
- “Bella Donna”
- “Paradise Stolen”
- “In Love with Romance”
- “Finaletto”

Act 3

- “Waltz Interlude”
- “Musical Scene”
- “Prayer”
- “Finale”

== Reception ==
Brooks Atkinson of The New York Times called it “pretentious fiddle-faddle,” while John Chapman of the New York Daily News said that the “lovely” Jeffreys made for an “enchanting operetta heroine” who sang Romberg's songs “as though they meant something.”

== Sources ==
- Mantle, Burns (ed.) The Best Plays of 1948–1949, Dodd, Mead and Company, New York, 1949, pp. 390–391.
- Dietz, Dan, The Complete Book of 1940s Broadway Musicals, Rowman & Littlefield, New York, 2015, pp. 462–464.
- Stubblebine, Daniel J., Broadway Sheet Music, McFarland & Company, Jefferson, NC 1996, #1595, p. 196.
- Bordman, Gerald, “Ámerican Musical Theatre,” Oxford University Press, New York, 1978, p. 564.
