= Paul Lukas =

Hungarian-American actor (1894–1971)

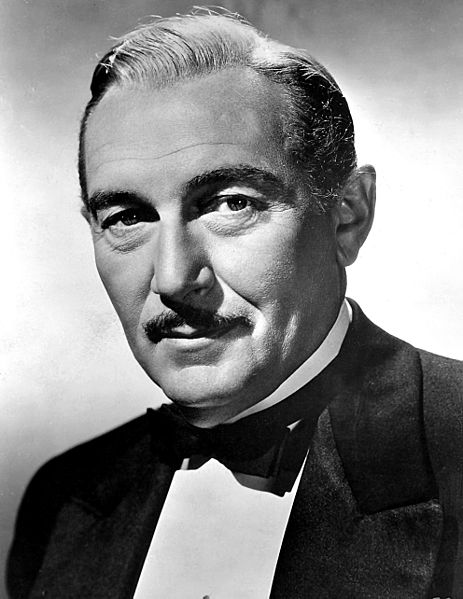
- Lukas in 1950
- Born: Pál Lukács; 26 May 1894; Budapest, Austria-Hungary
- Died: 15 August 1971 (aged 77); Tangier, Morocco
- Resting place: Cementerio de Benalmádena, Andalusia, Spain
- Occupation: Actor
- Years active: 1916–1970
- Spouses: Gizella "Daisy" Benes (m. 1927; died 1962) Annette M. Driesens (m. 1963)

Paul Lukas (born Pál Lukács; 26 May 1894 – 15 August 1971) was a Hungarian actor. He won the Academy Award for Best Actor, and the first Golden Globe Award for Best Actor – Motion Picture Drama, as well as a Photoplay Award and a New York Film Critics Circle Award for his performance in the film Watch on the Rhine (1943), reprising the role he created on the Broadway stage.

== Biography ==
Lukas was born Pál Lukács in Budapest into a Hungarian-Jewish family, the son of Adolf Munkácsi and Mária Schneckendorf. He was later adopted by Mária (née Zilahy) and János Lukács, an advertising executive.

Lukas made his stage debut in Budapest in 1916, and his film debut in 1917. At first, he played elegant, smooth womanizers, but increasingly, he became typecast as a villain. He had a successful stage and film career in Hungary, Germany, and Austria, where he worked with Max Reinhardt. He arrived in Hollywood in 1927, and became a naturalized citizen of the United States in 1937. In 1935, he built a home near the new Racquet Club of Palm Springs, California.

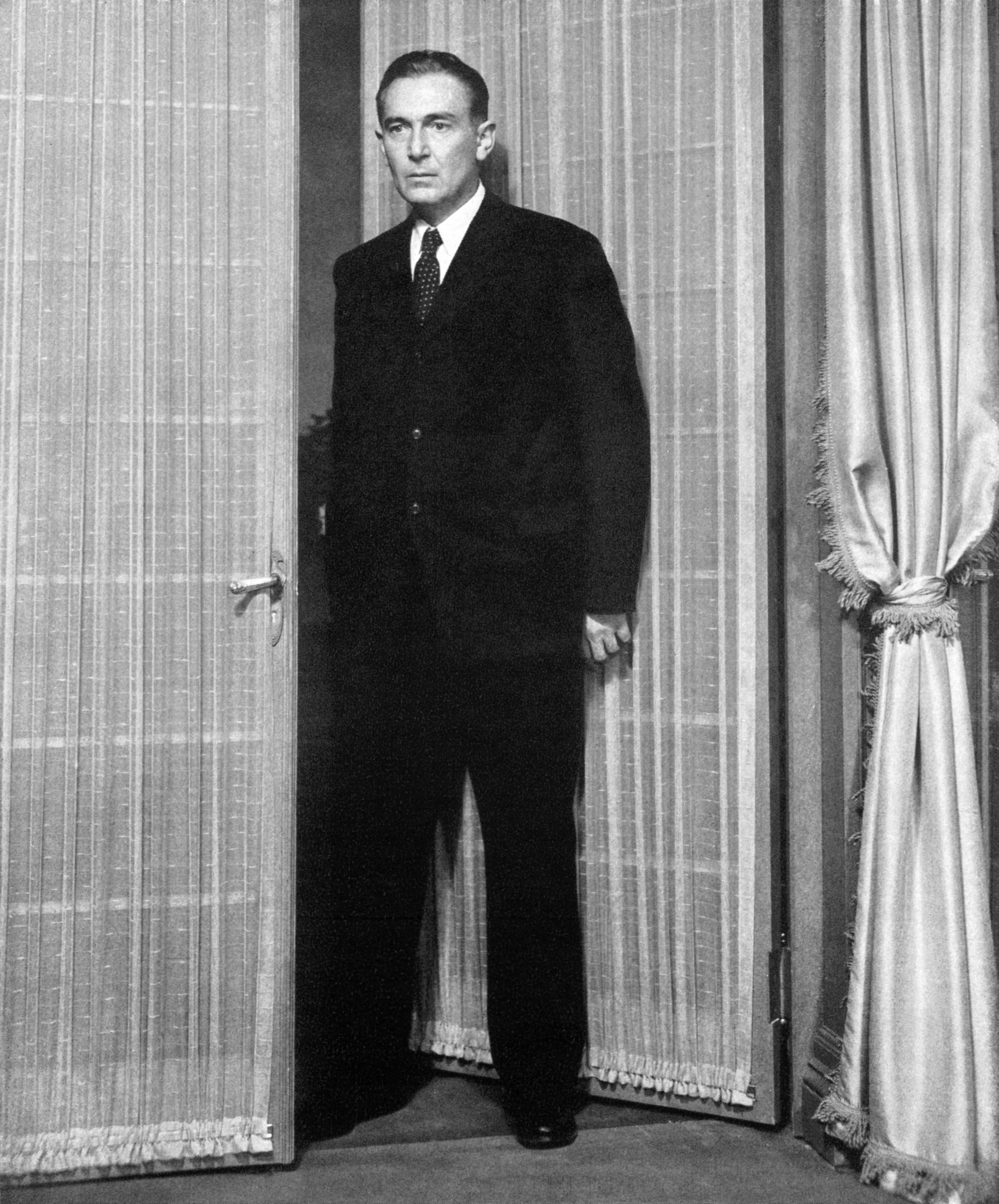
Paul Lukas starring as Kurt Mueller in the original Broadway production of Lillian Hellman's Watch on the Rhine (1941)

Lukas was busy in the 1930s, appearing in such films as the melodrama Rockabye, the crime caper Grumpy, Alfred Hitchcock's The Lady Vanishes, the comedy Ladies in Love, and the drama Dodsworth. He followed William Powell and Basil Rathbone, portraying the series detective Philo Vance, a cosmopolitan New Yorker, once in The Casino Murder Case (1935).

His major film success was Watch on the Rhine (1943), where he played a man working against the Nazis, a role he originated in the Broadway premiere of the play of the same name in 1941. His portrayal of Kurt Mueller, a German émigré with an American wife, played by Bette Davis, was universally lauded by critics. Brooks Atkinson of the New York Times, wrote: "As the enemy of fascism, Mr. Lukas' haggard, loving, resourceful determination becomes heroic by virtue of his sincerity and his superior abilities as an actor." He won the Academy Award for Best Actor for the role. He also received the New York Film Critics Circle Award for his performance.

In 1943, Lukas guest-starred as the lead character in an episode of the radio program Suspense, "Mr. Markham, Antique Dealer", as well as the character of a blind composer in the episode "A World of Darkness". On 2 April 1944, he starred in "The Steadfast Heart" on Silver Theater. In the 1940s, Lukas was a charter member of the Motion Picture Alliance for the Preservation of American Ideals, a conservative lobbying group opposed to possible Communist influence in Hollywood.

Lukas also starred as Professor Aronnax in Walt Disney's film version of Jules Verne's 20,000 Leagues Under the Sea (1954).

Lukas's film career continued into the 1960s, with nine films, including Fun in Acapulco with Elvis Presley in 1963 and Lord Jim with Peter O'Toole in 1965. His final film, The Challenge, was released in 1970.

The remainder of his career moved from Hollywood to the stage, and to television. His only singing role was as Cosmo Constantine in the original 1950 Broadway stage version of Irving Berlin's Call Me Madam, opposite Ethel Merman for over 600 performances (although he is heard singing a song in the 1933 film Little Women).

Lukas died 15 August 1971, in Tangier, Morocco, reportedly while searching for a place to spend his retirement years. He is buried in Spain.

== Recognition ==
Lukas was honored with a star on the Hollywood Walk of Fame, at 6821 Hollywood Boulevard, on February 8, 1960.

== Filmography ==
Year	Title	Role	Notes
1920	Boccaccio	Boccaccio	
1922	Samson and Delilah	Ettore Ricco, tenor	
1923	Triumphant Life	Lord Harry Arwood	
1923	The Unknown Tomorrow		
1928	Three Sinners	Count Dietrich Wallentin	Lost film
1928	Manhattan Cocktail	Boris Renov	Lost film
1928	The Woman from Moscow	Vladimir	Incomplete film
1928	Loves of an Actress	Doctor Durande	Lost film
1928	Two Lovers	Don Ramon de Linea	Incomplete film
1928	Hot News	James Clayton	Lost film
1928	Night Watch	Captain Corlaix	
1928	The Shopworn Angel	Bailey	Incomplete film
1929	The Wolf of Wall Street	David Tyler	Lost film
1929	Illusion	Count Fortuny	
1929	Half Way to Heaven	Nick Pogli	
1930	Behind the Make-Up	Boris	
1930	Slightly Scarlet	Malatroff	
1930	Young Eagles	Von Baden	
1930	The Benson Murder Case	Adolph Mohler	
1930	The Devil's Holiday	Dr Reynolds	
1930	Grumpy	Berci	
1930	Anybody's Woman	Gustave Saxon	
1930	The Right to Love	Eric	
1931	City Streets	Big Fellow Mashal	
1931	Unfaithful	Colin Graham	
1931	Working Girls	Doctor Joseph Von Schrader	
1931	Women Love Once	Julien Fields	
1931	The Beloved Bachelor	Michael Morda	
1931	Strictly Dishonorable	Gus	
1931	The Vice Squad	Stephen Lucarno	
1932	No One Man	Dr Karl Bemis	
1932	Tomorrow and Tomorrow	Doctor Nicholas Faber	
1932	Thunder Below	Ken	
1932	Downstairs	Albert, the Baron's Butler	
1932	A Passport to Hell	Lt. Kurt Kurtoff	
1932	Rockabye	Antonie de Sola	
1933	Grand Slam	Peter Stanislavsky	
1933	The Kiss Before the Mirror	Walter Bernsdorf	
1933	Sing Sinner Sing	Phil Carida	
1933	Secret of the Blue Room	Captain Walter Brink	
1933	Captured!	Colonel Carl Ehrlich	
1933	Little Women	Professor Bhaer	
1933	By Candlelight	Josef	
1934	The Countess of Monte Cristo	Rumowski	
1934	Glamour	Victor Banki	
1934	I Give My Love	Paul Vadja	
1934	Gift of Gab	The Corpse	
1934	Father Brown, Detective	Flambeau	
1934	The Fountain	Rupert von Narwitz	
1934	Affairs of a Gentleman	Victor Gresham	
1935	The Casino Murder Case	Philo Vance	
1935	Age of Indiscretion	Robert Lenhart	
1935	The Three Musketeers	Athos	
1935	I Found Stella Parish	Stephan Norman	
1936	Dodsworth	Arnold Iselin	
1936	Ladies in Love	John Barta	
1937	Brief Ecstasy	Professor Paul Bernardy	
1937	The Mutiny of the Elsinore	Jack Pethurst	
1937	Espionage	Anton Kronsky	
1937	Dinner at the Ritz	Baron Philip de Beaufort	
1938	The Lady Vanishes	Dr. Hartz	
1939	Confessions of a Nazi Spy	Dr. Kassell	
1939	Captain Fury	Francois Dupre	
1940	Strange Cargo	Hessler	
1940	The Chinese Bungalow	Yuan Sing	
1940	The Ghost Breakers	Parada	
1940	A Window in London	Zoltini	Released as Lady in Distress in the US
1941	The Monster and the Girl	W. S. Bruhl	
1941	They Dare Not Love	Baron von Helsing	
1943	Hostages	Rheinhardt	
1943	Watch on the Rhine	Kurt Muller	Won Academy Award for Best Actor
1944	Uncertain Glory	Inspector Marcel Bonet	
1944	Address Unknown	Martin Schulz	
1944	Experiment Perilous	Nick Bederaux	
1946	Deadline at Dawn	Gus Hoffman	
1946	Temptation	Sir Meyer Isaacson	
1947	Whispering City	Albert Frederic	
1947	Don't Be a Sucker	The Refugee	Produced by the US War Department
1948	Berlin Express	Dr Bernhardt	
1950	Kim	Lama	
1954	20,000 Leagues Under the Sea	Prof. Pierre Aronnax	
1958	The Roots of Heaven	Saint Denis	
1959	Judgment at Nuremberg	Ernst Janning	
1960	Scent of Mystery	Baron Saradin	See Smell-O-Vision
1962	Tender Is the Night	Dr. Dohmler	
1962	Four Horsemen of the Apocalypse	Karl von Hartrott	
1963	55 Days at Peking	Dr. Steinfeldt	
1963	Fun in Acapulco	Maximillian Dauphin	
1965	Lord Jim	Stein	
1968	Sol Madrid	Capo Riccione	
1970	The Challenge	Dr Nagy	TV movie

== See also ==
- List of actors with Academy Award nominations
