= Li Chʻing-Chao (crater) =

Crater on Mercury

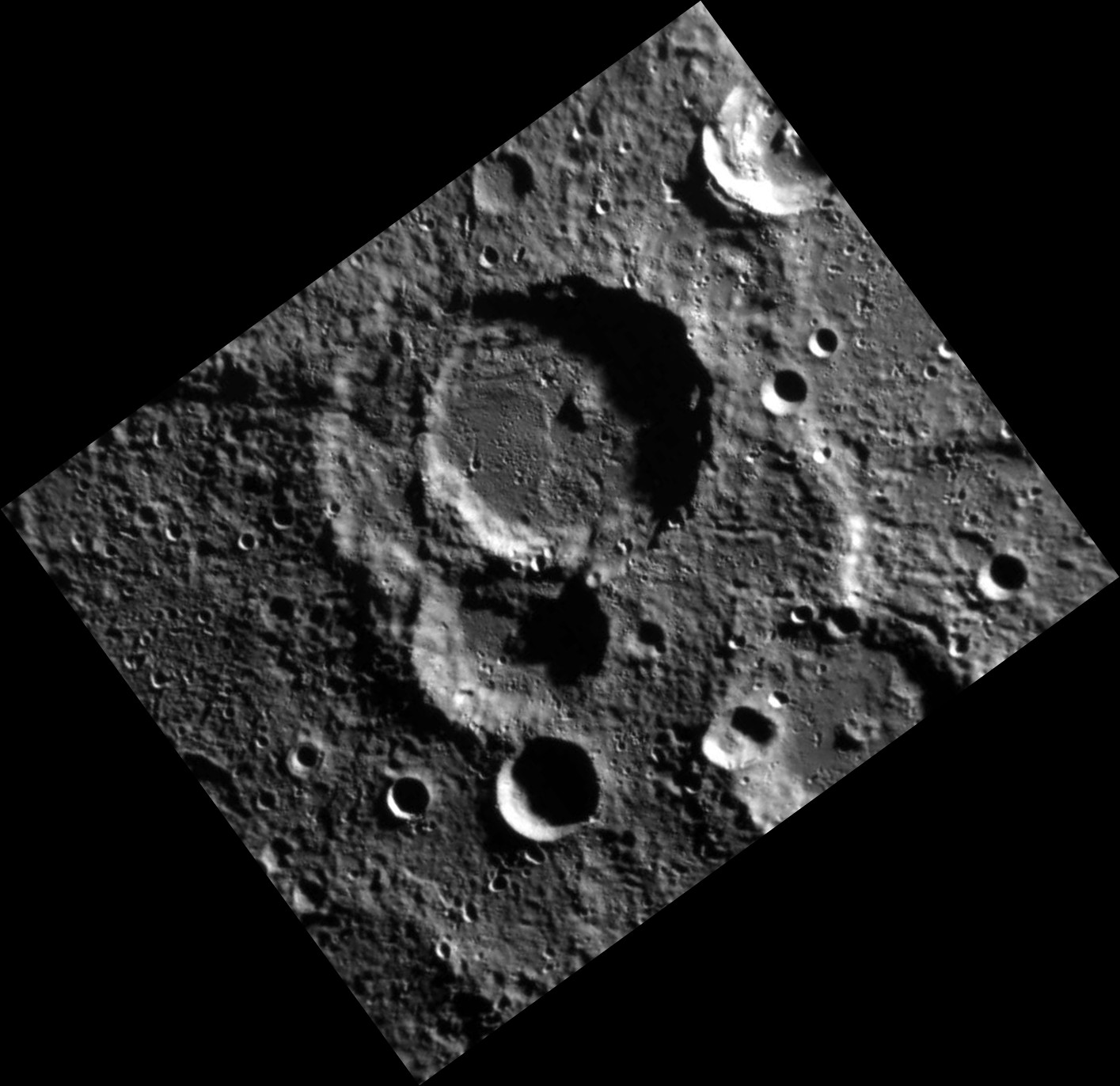
- MESSENGER NAC image of Li Chʻing-Chao
- Feature type: Impact crater
- Location: Bach quadrangle, Mercury
- Coordinates: 77.96°S 71.17°W
- Diameter: 69 km (43 mi)
- Eponym: Li Qingzhao

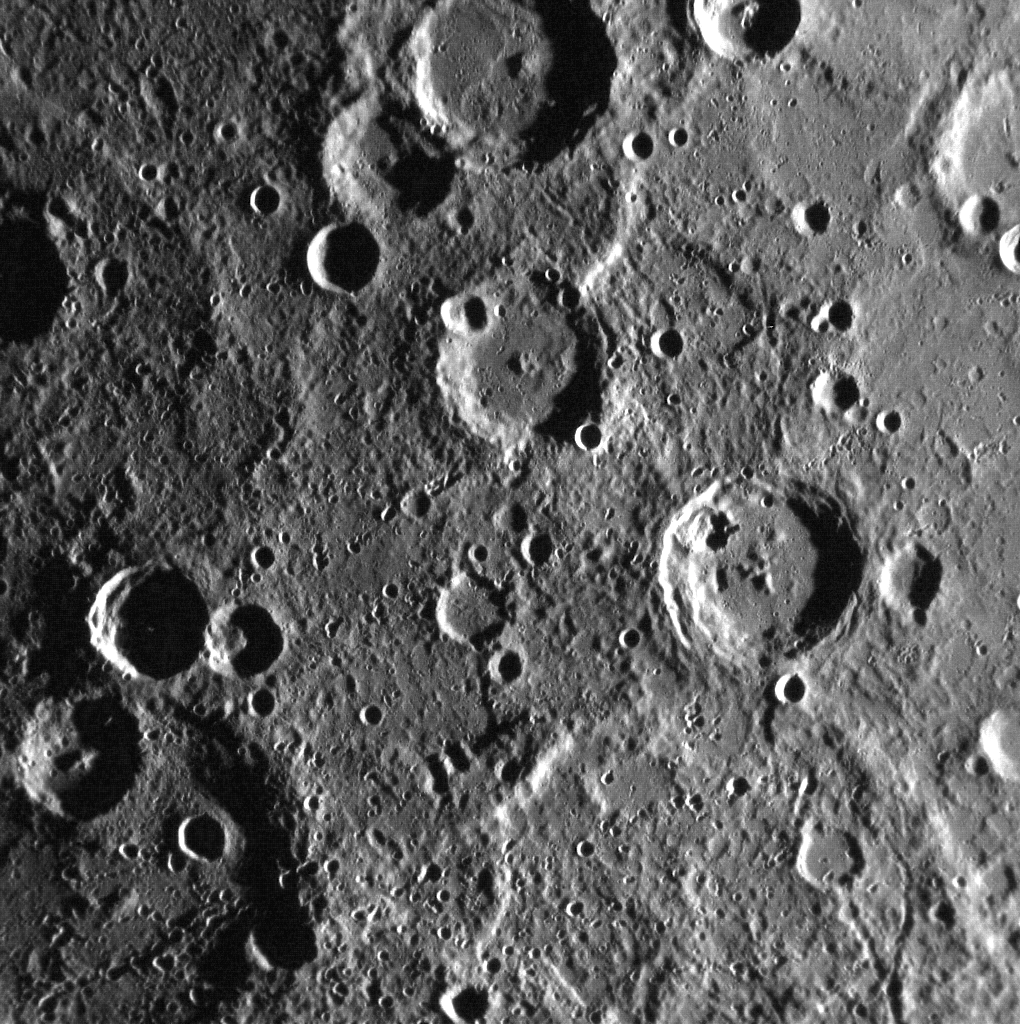
Li Chʻing-Chao is at the top of this MESSENGER image. Sadī is right of center, and Roerich is in lower left.

Li Chʻing-Chao is a crater on Mercury. It has a diameter of 61 kilometers. Its name was adopted by the International Astronomical Union (IAU) in 1976. Li Chʻing-Chao is named for the Chinese poet Li Qingzhao, who lived from 1081 to c. 1141.

The northern rim of Li Chʻing-Chao is in permanent shadow.
