= Boccaccio (1920 film) =

1920 film

- Directed by: Michael Curtiz
- Produced by: Sascha Film
- Starring: Paul Lukas; Ica von Lenkeffy
- Cinematography: Gustav Ucicky
- Release date: 30 January 1920 (Austria)
- Country: Austria
- Language: Silent with German intertitles

Boccaccio (aka Boccaccios Liebesnachte) is a 1920 Austrian silent film noir directed by Michael Curtiz and starring Paul Lukas, as Boccaccio, and Ica von Lenkeffy. Gustav Ucicky was the cinematographer. The film was released in Austria in January 1920. The aspect ratio is 1.33:1.
