= The Dollar Done Fell =

The Dollar Done Fell / Live at the Checkerboard Lounge

Live album by Buddy Guy
- Released: 1980 (LP) / 1988 (CD)
- Recorded: 1979
- Venue: Checkerboard Lounge, Chicago, Illinois
- Genre: Blues, Chicago Blues
- Length: 56:20 (LP) / 59:50 (CD)
- Label: JSP
- Producer: Buddy Guy

Buddy Guy chronology
Stone Crazy! (1979)	The Dollar Done Fell / Live at the Checkerboard Lounge (1980)	Breaking Out (1980)

Professional ratings
Review scores
Source	Rating
AllMusic	1/5 stars
The Penguin Guide to Blues Recordings	(CD Reissue)

The Dollar Done Fell is the second live album by Buddy Guy.

== Background ==
After Buddy Guy recorded an album for the French label Isabel, Englishman John Stedman, the owner of JSP Records, suggested recording a live show. They recorded it in Chicago at Guy's club, Checkerboard Lounge. The band was the same as on the Isabel session, plus a third guitarist Phil Smith and L.C. Thurman (co-owner of Checkerboard) added a few lead vocals as a guest.

The Penguin Guide to Blues Recordings comments that the album captures Guy “at his most idiomatic”.

== Releases ==
Nine tracks were released on The Dollar Done Fell LP in 1980 by JSP. First released on CD in 1988, also on JSP, but with an alternate track list, titled Live at the Checkerboard Lounge. The CD version was missing one track ("Trouble with My Women"), and the 16-minute title track ("The Dollar Done Fell") fades out at 6:36. Two more tracks were added to the CD version, "Don't Answer the Door" featuring lead vocals by L.C. Thurston, and an alternate version of "Tell Me What's Inside of You". "I've Got A Right To Love My Woman" fades out at 8:05 on the original vinyl, but the CD includes the full-length version. There are three more CD reissues with the same track listing as on the original CD release, but with three alternate covers. It was first released in the U.S. in 1995.

== Recordings ==
All lead guitar parts are played by Buddy Guy, except first lead of "Buddy's Blues, Part 1", first lead of "Done Got Over You", and main lead of "Don't Answer the Door" by Phil Guy; lead in the middle of "Don't Answer the Door" by Little Phil Smith. Buddy Guy didn't play on "Don't Answer the Door" at all. "You Don't Know How I Feel" is actually the blues standard "I'll Take Care of You", but it was retitled. The music of "Tell Me What's Inside Of You" is based on Eric Clapton's "Strange Brew". The music of "The Dollar Done Fell" is based on the funky standard "Chicken Heads".

== Original vinyl track listing ==
1. "Buddy's Blues (Part 1)" – 4:13
2. "I 've Got A Right To Love My Woman" – 8:05
3. "Done Got Over You" – 4:10
4. "Tell Me What's Inside Of You" – 9:20
5. "Trouble With My Women" – 4:05
6. "The Things I Used To Do" – 3:18
7. "You Don't Know How I Feel" – 3:12
8. "The Dollar Done Fell" – 16:22
9. "Buddy"s Blues (Part 2)" – 3:25

== CD track listing ==
1. "Buddy's Blues (Part One)" – 4:05
2. "I've Got A Right To Love My Woman" – 9:07
3. "Tell Me What's Inside Of You" – 9:24
4. "Done Got Over You" – 4:13
5. "The Things I Used To Do" – 3:20
6. "You Don't Know How I Feel" – 3:22
7. "The Dollar Done Fell" – 6:36
8. "Buddy's Blues (Part Two)" – 4:01
9. "Don't Answer The Door" – 7:31
10. "Tell Me What's Inside Of You (Version Two)" – 7:10

== Note ==
"Buddy's Blues (Part 2)" is the last three minutes of the 20-minute song "Knock on Wood", which was released completely on another JSP release in 1981, simply titled Buddy & Philip Guy. That release also included "Don't Answer the Door".

== Musicians ==
- Buddy Guy – guitars, vocals
- Phil Guy – guitars
- Little Phil Smith – guitars
- J.W. Williams – bass
- Ray Allison – drums

Additional musician

- L.C. Thurston – vocals on "Don't Answer the Door" and "Knock on Wood"
