= Denes Agay =

Hungarian-American composer

- Born: June 10, 1911; Kiskunfélegyháza, Lands of the Crown of Saint Stephen, Austria-Hungary
- Died: January 24, 2007 (aged 95); Los Altos, California, United States
- Education: Franz Liszt Academy of Music
- Occupations: Composer; music educator; arranger; author

Denes Agay (June 10, 1911 – January 24, 2007) was a Hungarian-born, Hungarian-American composer, music educator, arranger and author. Agay is known for compiling the million-selling music collection Best Loved Songs of the American People (1975).

== Early life and career ==
Agay was born on June 10, 1911 in Kiskunfélegyháza, Austria-Hungary (present-day, Hungary) to Hungarian-Jewish family. Agay began playing piano at the age of three. In 1934 he completed his musical studies at the Franz Liszt Academy of Music in Budapest. He was simultaneously studying law at the University of Budapest, but dropped out a year before earning his degree to concentrate on music.

Agay conducted the Budapest Philharmonic Orchestra in a performance of a symphony which he composed. He worked as a film composer; one film assignment was writing the background music for Hedy Lamarr's nude scene in the 1933 film Ecstasy.

== Move to the US ==
Agay was Jewish, and after the rise of Nazism, he emigrated to New York in 1939. His parents were murdered in Auschwitz. In 1942 he became an American citizen and joined the military, entertaining patients in the hospital wards in Tuscaloosa, Alabama.

After the war Agay returned to music publishing, employed by companies including Music Sales Corp., Yorktown Music Press, and Consolidated Music Publishers. He married Mary Roberts in 1947. At the time he was composing popular songs and writing librettos as well as classical music. In 1948, he wrote the score for the musical comedy "My Romance", which folded on the road before getting to Broadway. A new score was written by Sigmund Romberg for Broadway, but the show wasn't successful. He was the conductor and arranger on the NBC show Guest Star, which featured stars including Bing Crosby, The Andrews Sisters and Perry Como.

== Later career ==
Today Agay is most remembered for more than 90 music books, including a multi-volume collection of piano arrangements, The Young Pianist's Library, and the four volume An Anthology of Piano Music. In 1975 he produced the popular anthology, Best Loved Songs of the American People, which sold millions of copies. His Joy of series continued to be published into the 21st Century, including The Joy of Schubert (1998) and The Joy of Holiday Music (2001).

Agay also continued to compose for the concert hall and for educational purposes. His lively Sonatina No. 3 was frequently performed by young performers at piano recitals. The 'Blue Waltz', taken from The Joy of Boogie and Blues is a Grade 5 piece for the Associated Board. His Five Easy Dances of 1956 have remained popular with wind ensembles.

== Death and legacy ==
Agay's wife Mary died in 1999. Agay died in Los Altos, California in 2007 at the age of 95. Late in their lives he and his wife endowed a Piano and Composition Scholarship Fund for the Peabody Conservatory in Baltimore, Maryland. His daughter is the attorney Susan Agay Rothschild.
