= Boccaccio (crater) =

Crater on Mercury

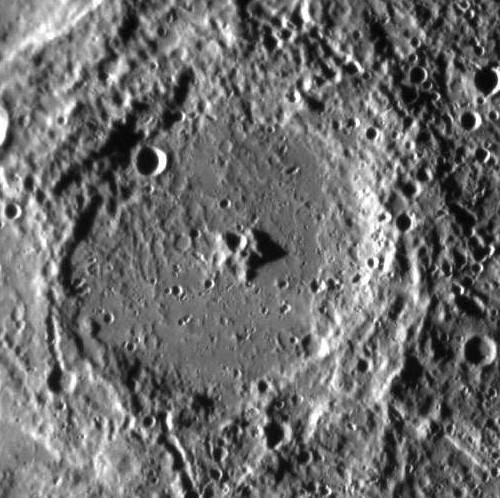
- MESSENGER image of Boccaccio
- Feature type: Impact crater
- Location: Bach quadrangle, Mercury
- Coordinates: 80.99°S 23.01°W
- Diameter: 151.95 km (94.42 mi)
- Eponym: Giovanni Boccaccio

Boccaccio is a crater on Mercury. It has a diameter of 151.95 kilometers. Its name was adopted by the International Astronomical Union (IAU) in 1976. Boccaccio is named after the Italian author Giovanni Boccaccio, who lived from 1313 to 1375.

To the west of Boccaccio is Sadī crater, and to the southwest is Roerich.
