= Charles Fredericks =

American actor

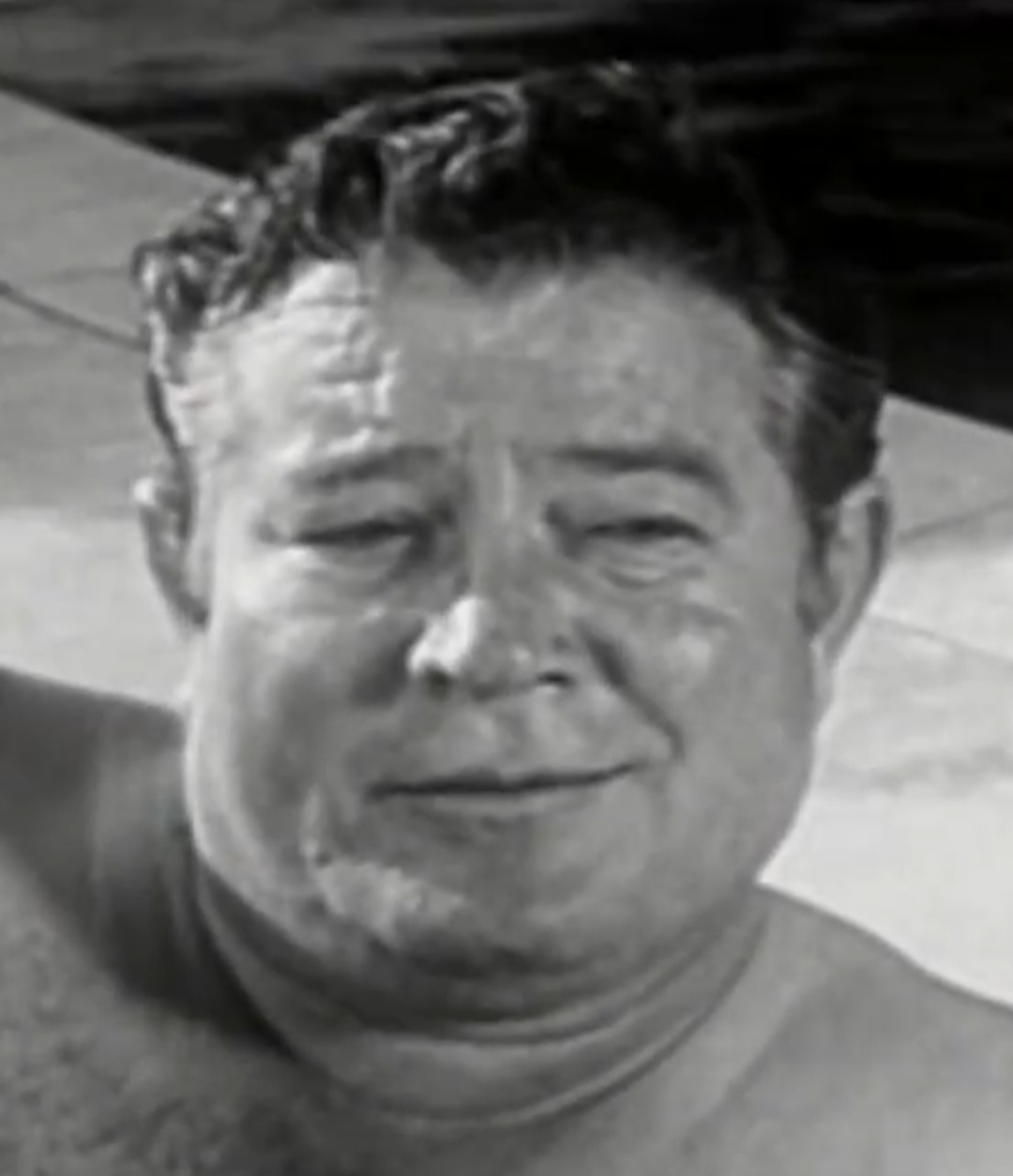
- Fredericks in an episode of Lock-Up (1960)
- Born: Fred Cockerham (or Crockenham); September 5, 1918; Columbus, Mississippi, U.S.
- Died: May 14, 1970 (aged 51); Sherman Oaks, Los Angeles County, California, U.S.
- Resting place: Forest Lawn Memorial Park, Hollywood Hills
- Occupation: Actor
- Years active: 1954–1969
- Spouse: Muriel Parker
- Children: 2

Charles Fredericks (born Fred Cockerham; or Crockenham; September 5, 1918 – May 14, 1970) was an American actor of stage, television, and film.

== Early years ==
Fredericks was born Fred Cockerham (or Crockenham) the son of a Presbyterian minister M. O. Cockerham and his wife. He had two brothers. He sang in the choir at the church at which his father preached. Although his father wanted him to become a minister, Fredericks wanted to be a singer. Success in competitions moved him further in that direction, as he won one contest that designated him the best male singer in Mississippi and another that earned him a singing scholarship.

== Career ==
Fredericks was particularly known for his career in television Westerns during the 1950s and 1960s.

=== Singing ===
Fredericks debuted as a professional singer at the Brown Palace Hotel in Denver. After two weeks when the orchestra leader paid him $5 per week out of his own pocket, the hotel manager raised his salary to $20 per week. He went from that job to performing in vaudeville at $75 per week — an unsuccessful venture that led him back to Denver. With no employment as a singer available, he worked as a bellhop.

=== Stage and film ===
John Charles Thomas heard Fredericks singing in a night club and "was instrumental" in helping Fredericks to obtain the role of the governor when The Red Mill was presented by the Los Angeles Civic Light Opera.

Fredericks gained early acting experience on the "Borscht circuit" in the Catskill Mountains. During the summer, his troupe performed a musical comedy, a revue, and a straight drama at each hotel.

Fredericks received the George Jean Nathan Award for his performance when he starred as Gaylord Ravenal in the 1946 Broadway revival of Show Boat, and was selected for the same role in the film of that title. He also appeared as Captain Nicholas Gregorovitch in the original 1947 production of Music in My Heart. In 1948, he portrayed a minister in My Romance at the Shubert Theatre in Boston and elsewhere, but he was replaced in the revised version that went to Broadway. He had the lead role in Music in the Air at the Greek Theater in Los Angeles. In 1953, he portrayed Sky Masterson in a touring company of Guys and Dolls.

Fredericks portrayed the singing King in the "Just You Wait" sequence of the film My Fair Lady (1964).

=== Radio and television ===
On July 13, 1947, Fredericks sang on the Family Hour radio program.

Among Fredericks's work on television, on Colt .45, he appeared as "Larkin" in the episode "Small Man" (1957) and as Marshal Ed Springer in "The Gandy Dancers".(1960). He portrayed Sheriff Ankers on Bat Masterson in S3E10s "Last Stop To Austin". He also appeared as villains in the Maverick episodes "Trail West to Fury" and "The Maverick Line". He appeared in The Tab Hunter Show episode "For Money or Love" (1960). He also appeared on Gunsmoke as “Band” (1959), as “Jed”, S5E38 1960, as “Senator McGovern” (1962), in S8E15's "False Front" and earlier that year as a convicted soldier in S7E33’s “The Prisoner”.

== Personal life ==
Fredericks was married to singer Muriel Parker, and they had two sons. He died in 1970 and was buried in Hollywood Hills at Forest Lawn Cemetery.

== Partial filmography ==
- Thunder Pass (1954) - McCurdy
- Port of Hell (1954)
- Treasure of Ruby Hills (1955) - Walt Payne
- Tarzan's Hidden Jungle (1955) - DeGroot
- Las Vegas Shakedown (1955) - Sheriff Charlie Woods
- Night Freight (1955) - Workman
- Hell Canyon Outlaws (1957) - Deputy Bear
- I Want to Live! (1958) - Sucker at Card Game (uncredited)
- Ice Palace (1960) - Bit Role (uncredited)
- A Fever in the Blood (1961) - Callahan Party Worker (uncredited)
- Tender Is the Night (1962) - Mr. Albert Charles McKisco
- Lad, A Dog (1962) - Sheriff
- The Cabinet of Caligari (1962) - Bob
- Hemingway's Adventures of a Young Man (1962) - Mayor
- Black Gold (1962) - Oil Man (uncredited)
- To Kill a Mockingbird (1962) - Court Clerk (uncredited)
- Dead Ringer (1964) - Tom Marshall (uncredited)
- A House Is Not a Home (1964) - Bert
- Kisses for My President (1964) - Blonde's Escort (uncredited)
- My Fair Lady (1964) - King George V in Fantasy Sequence (uncredited)
- The Great Race (1965) - Master of Ceremonies (uncredited)

== Television ==
Year	Title	Role	Notes
1958	Gunsmoke	Earl Brant	Season 4 Episode 12: "Grass"
1960	Gunsmoke	Sergeant Strate	Season 5 Episode 38: "The Deserter"
1960	Maverick	Shotgun Sparks	Season 4 Episode 10: "The Maverick Line"
1961	Rawhide	Banning	Season 3 Episode 22: "Incident in the Middle of Nowhere"
1963	The Alfred Hitchcock Hour	Movie Warden	Season 2 Episode 7: "Starring the Defense"
1965	The Alfred Hitchcock Hour	Big Man	Season 3 Episode 15: "Thanatos Palace Hotel"
