= Karl Farkas =

Austrian actor and cabaret performer (1893-1971)

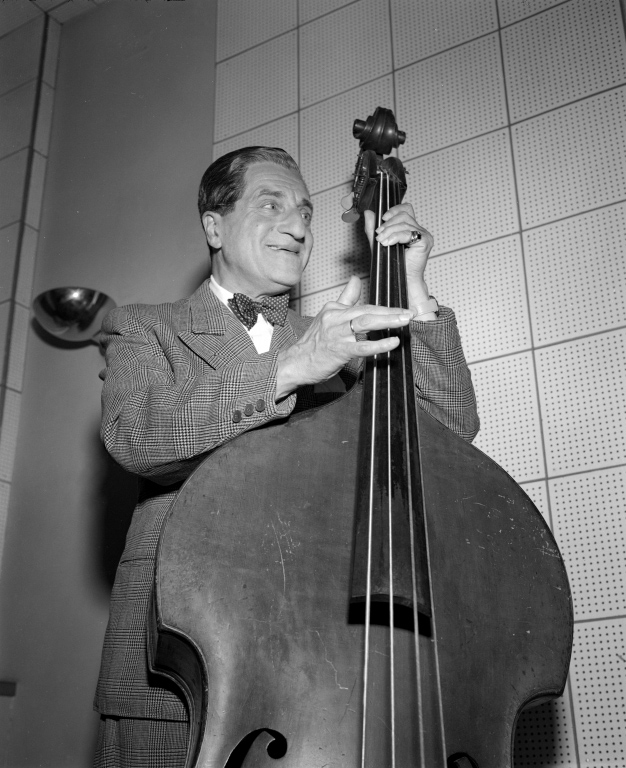
- Karl Farkas in 1951
- Born: 28 October 1893; Vienna, Austria-Hungary
- Died: 16 May 1971 (aged 77); Vienna, Austria

Karl Farkas (28 October 1893 – 16 May 1971) was an Austrian actor and cabaret performer.

== Biography ==
In accordance with the wishes of his parents, he was to study law, but decided to follow the call of the stage. After attending the Academy of Music and Acting Arts in Vienna, he debuted in Olmütz as Tsarevich, in a play by Gabryela Zapolska.

After various stage appearances in Austria and Moravia, he returned to Vienna in 1921, where he was engaged by Egon Dorn, the director of the Kabarett Simpl. There he worked as a 'Blitzdichter' (nickname: the Tick), and performed together with Fritz Grünbaum in a Doppelconférence, a cabaret number created in Budapest and consisting of a dialogue between two actors, one of whom plays a clever and educated interlocutor while the other has the role of a blunderer.

He married Anny Hán in 1924. Under the Nazi regime in 1938, he was forced to become a refugee because of his Jewish descent, going first to Brno, then Paris and ending up in New York. There he performed for other exiles and wrote his book of poems Farkas entdeckt Amerika (Farkas discovers America). Moreover, he wrote the libretto to Kálmán's operetta Marinka.

In 1946, he returned to Vienna, and from 1950 on, he performed at the Simpl again, now as its director, a role in which he remained until his death.

He also worked as a writer and director, contributing the program of all the revues together with Ernst Waldbrunn and Hugo Wiener, who in his turn also wrote his Doppelconférences.

From 1957 onward, he appeared on a regular basis in broadcasting and later on the Austrian TV channel, ORF. Very popular were his Balances, e.g. balance of the year, balance of the month, etc.

Farkas also is the main character in the Austrian revue comic book Der Blöde und der Gscheite (engl.: The Stupid and the Smart One), released in 2014, drawn by illustrator Reinhard Trinkler and based on the classic Doppelconférences by Hugo Wiener.

== Works (selection) ==
=== Libretti ===
- Journal der Liebe. Revue written in 1926 together with Fritz Grünbaum to music by Egon Neumann.
- Wien lacht wieder!. Revue written in 1926 together with Fritz Grünbaum to music by Ralph Benatzky.
- Die Wunder-Bar. Musical comedy written in 1929 together with Géza Herczeg to music by Robert Katscher.
- Der Traumexpreß. Revue written in 1931 together with Fritz Grünbaum to music by Robert Katscher.
- Hofloge. Musical comedy written in 1936, based on a story by J. M. Crawford, to music by Hans Lang.
- Dixie. Ein Musikalischer Kriminalroman in 5 Kapiteln: Revue written in 1938 together with Adolf Schütz to music by Michael Krasznay-Krausz.
- Marinka. Operetta written in 1945 together with George Marion Jr. to music by Emmerich Kálmán.

=== Books ===
- Also sprach Farkas. Heiteres von Karl Farkas. Halm & Goldmann, Vienna 1930, with drawings by Matouschek.
- Farkas entdeckt Amerika. Funny book of poems, Triton Publishing Company, New York 1942, with drawings by Hans Burger
- Zurück ins Morgen. Paramount Printing and Publishing Co., New York 1946, with drawings by Matouschek.

== Selected filmography ==
=== Film adaptations ===
- When the Soldiers, directed by Luise Fleck and Jacob Fleck (1931, based on a play by Karl Farkas)
- By Candlelight, directed by James Whale (1933, based on the musical comedy Bei Kerzenlicht)
- Wonder Bar, directed by Lloyd Bacon (1934, based on the musical comedy Die Wunder-Bar)
- Le Chant du destin, directed by Jean-René Legrand (1936, remake of the film Adventures on the Lido)
- Land of Love, directed by Reinhold Schünzel (1937, based on the musical comedy Hofloge), uncredited
- Hofloge, directed by John Olden (1954, TV film, based on the musical comedy Hofloge)
- Wunder Bar, directed by Daniele D'Anza (1955, TV film, based on the musical comedy Die Wunder-Bar)
- Bei Kerzenlicht, directed by Rolf Kutschera (1958, TV film, based on the musical comedy Bei Kerzenlicht)
- Hofloge, directed by John Olden (1964, TV film, based on the musical comedy Hofloge)
- Bei Kerzenlicht, directed by Ferry Olsen (1968, TV film, based on the musical comedy Bei Kerzenlicht)
- Bei Kerzenlicht, directed by Jochen Bauer (1981, TV film, based on the musical comedy Bei Kerzenlicht)

=== Screenwriter ===
- Lumpenkavaliere (dir. Carl Boese, 1932)
- Sehnsucht 202 (dir. Max Neufeld, 1932, German-language version)
  - Une jeune fille et un million (dir. Max Neufeld and Fred Ellis, 1932, French-language version)
- Adventures on the Lido (dir. Richard Oswald, 1933)
- Pipin der Kurze (dir. Carl Heinz Wolff, 1934)
- Leap into Bliss (dir. Fritz Schulz, 1934)
- Roxy and the Wonderteam (dir. Johann von Vásáry, 1938)
- Boogie-Woogie Dream (dir. Hanuš Burger, 1944, short)
- Fregola (dir. Harald Röbbeling, 1948)
- L'Inconnu d'un soir (dir. Max Neufeld and Hervé Bromberger, 1949, French-language version)
  - Liebling der Welt (dir. Max Neufeld, 1949, German-language version)
- Nothing But Coincidence (dir. E. W. Emo, 1949)
- Theodore the Goalkeeper (dir. E. W. Emo, 1950)
- Gruß und Kuß aus der Wachau (dir. Fritz Schulz, 1950)
- Der Fünfminutenvater (dir. Johann Alexander Hübler-Kahla, 1951)
- Shame on You, Brigitte! (1952)
- Ich und meine Frau (dir. Eduard von Borsody, 1953)
- Ein tolles Früchtchen (dir. Franz Antel, 1953)
- Hab’ ich nur Deine Liebe (dir. Eduard von Borsody, 1953)
- The Sweetest Fruits (dir. Franz Antel, 1954)
- Die Wirtin zur Goldenen Krone (dir. Theo Lingen, 1955)
- And Who Is Kissing Me? (dir. Max Nosseck, 1956)
- Rosmarie kommt aus Wildwest (dir. Wolfgang Becker, 1956)
- Where the Lark Sings (dir. Hans Wolff, 1956)
- August der Halbstarke (dir. Hans Wolff, 1957)
- Vater macht Karriere (dir. Carl Boese, 1957)
- The Schimeck Family (dir. Georg Jacoby, 1957)
- Ober, zahlen! (dir. E. W. Emo, 1957)
- Trees Are Blooming in Vienna (dir. Hans Wolff, 1958)
- Love, Girls and Soldiers (dir. Franz Antel, 1958)
- … und du mein Schatz bleibst hier (dir. Franz Antel, 1961)
- Im schwarzen Rößl (dir. Franz Antel, 1961)
- Romy und Julius (dir. Peter Hey, 1963, TV film)
