= Chao Meng-Fu (crater) =

Crater on Mercury

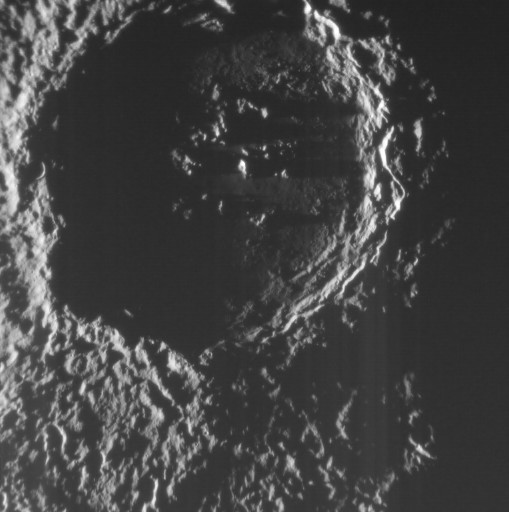
- MESSENGER NAC image centered on Chao Meng-Fu. Located near Mercury's south pole, a large portion of the crater is permanently shadowed
- Feature type: Impact crater
- Location: Bach quadrangle, Mercury
- Coordinates: 87.3°S 132.4°W
- Diameter: 167 km (104 mi)
- Eponym: Zhao Mengfu

This illumination map of Mercury's south pole shows that the floor of Chao Meng-Fu and that of many surrounding craters is in permanent shadow.

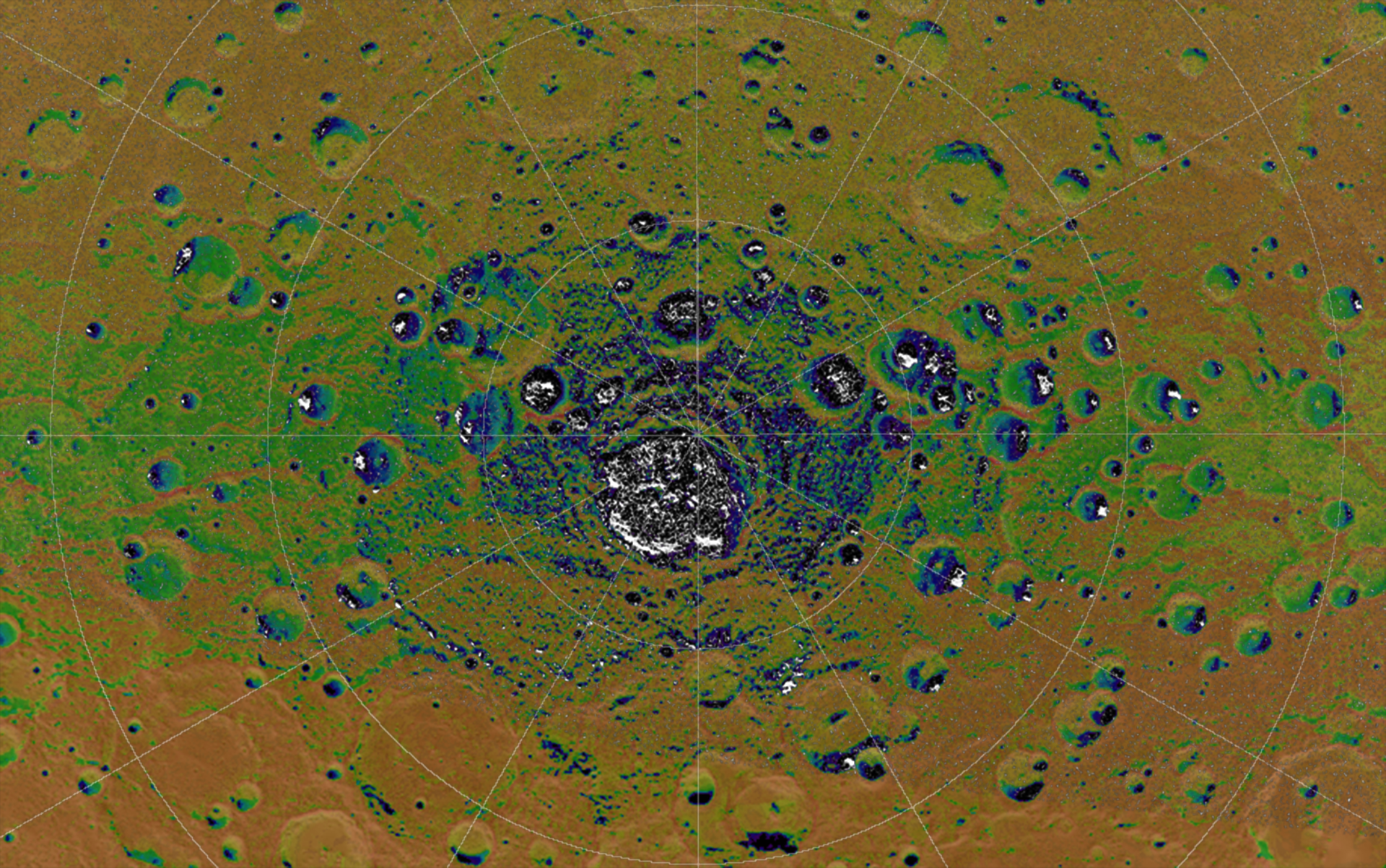
This map shows the radar-bright areas in white overlain on part of the map above.

Chao Meng-Fu is a 167 km (104 mi) diameter crater on Mercury named after the Chinese painter and calligrapher Zhao Mengfu (1254–1322). Due to its location near Mercury's south pole (132.4° west, 87.3° south) and the planet's small axial tilt, an estimated 40% of the crater lies in permanent shadow. This combined with bright radar echoes from the location of the crater leads scientists to suspect that it may shelter large quantities of ice protected against sublimation into the near-vacuum by the constant −171 °C (−276 °F) temperatures.

== Radar evidence for ice ==
Radar studies involving Arecibo (Puerto Rico), Goldstone (California, United States), and the Very Large Array (New Mexico, United States) detected a number of highly-radar-reflective depolarized areas on Mercury, including several locations at the planet's poles. Many of these reflective features appear to coincide with craters imaged by Mariner 10, with the largest feature at the south pole corresponding to Chao Meng-Fu crater.

The luminosity and depolarization of the radar reflections are much more characteristic of ice than of the silicate rocks making up Mercury's crust. Still, these reflections are too dim to be pure ice; it has been hypothesized that this is due to a thin or partial layer of powder over the underlying ice. However, with no direct confirmation, it is always possible that the observed radar reflectivity from Chao Meng-Fu and similar craters is due to depositions of metal-rich minerals and compounds. NASA's MESSENGER mission confirmed the strong correlation of radar reflectivity with permanently shadowed craters, as shown on the maps to the right.

=== Ice origins ===
Chao Meng-Fu's ice may have originated from impacts of water-rich meteorites and comets or from internal outgassing. Due to bombardment by the solar wind and intense light from the Sun, ice deposits on most of Mercury would be rapidly lost to space; in the permanently shadowed portions of Chao Meng-Fu, though, temperatures are too low to permit appreciable sublimation and ice may well have accumulated over billions of years.

== Chao Meng-Fu crater in fiction ==
A geothermally heated ocean beneath Chao Meng-Fu crater serves as the home of an alien species in Stephen Baxter's story Cilia-of-Gold, first published in the August 1994 issue of Asimov's and reprinted in his collection Vacuum Diagrams.

Gerald Nordley's novelette Crossing Chao Meng-Fu, originally published in the December 1997 issue of Analog, depicts rock-climbers struggling to traverse the crater.

Mark Anson's novel Below Mercury is set in an abandoned ice mine below Chao Meng-fu crater.

== See also ==
- Geology of Mercury
- List of craters on Mercury
- List of geological features on Mercury
