= Edwin Gilbert (writer) =

American dramatist

Edwin Gilbert (July 15, 1907 – August 24, 1976) was a novelist and playwright/scriptwriter who authored popular novels, including Native Stone in 1956.

Gilbert was born in Mannheim, Germany in 1907 and moved to Detroit in the United States as a child. He studied architecture at the University of Michigan, but went into play writing after winning a prize for a one-act play. Moving to New York City, he wrote plays, as well as some magazine work. During World War II, he served in the United States Army Air Forces, for which he wrote documentary films. After the war, he published a number of novels, including best sellers Native Stone (1956) and Silver Spoon (1957).

In 1968, he signed the Writers and Editors War Tax Protest pledge, vowing to refuse tax payments in protest against the Vietnam War.

Gilbert was married to wife Virginia for 32 years before they divorced in 1973.

== Selected bibliography ==
- The Squirrel Cage (1947)
- Damion's Daughter (1949) - adapted into a play broadcast in Season 2 of The Philco Television Playhouse.
- The Hot and the Cool (1953)
- Native Stone (1956)
- Silver Spoon (1957)
- The New Ambassadors (1961)
- The Beautiful Life (1966)
- A Season in Monte Carlo (1976)
