= The Road Back (film) =

1937 film by James Whale

- Theatrical release poster
- Directed by: James Whale
- Screenplay by: Charles Kenyon; R. C. Sherriff
- Based on: The Road Back; 1931 novel by Erich Maria Remarque
- Produced by: Edmund Grainger; Charles R. Rogers
- Starring: John King; Richard Cromwell; Slim Summerville; Andy Devine; Noah Beery Jr.
- Cinematography: John J. Mescall; George Robinson
- Edited by: Ted J. Kent; Charles Maynard
- Music by: Dimitri Tiomkin
- Production company: Universal Pictures
- Distributed by: Universal Pictures
- Release date: June 1, 1937
- Running time: 100 minutes
- Country: United States
- Language: English
- Budget: $955,000

The Road Back is a 1937 American historical drama war film directed by James Whale, starring John King, Richard Cromwell, and Slim Summerville with a supporting cast featuring Andy Devine, Louise Fazenda, Noah Beery Jr., Lionel Atwill, Spring Byington, Al Shean, and an uncredited Dwight Frye. The screenplay is by Charles Kenyon and R. C. Sherriff from the 1931 novel of the same name by Erich Maria Remarque. Combining a strong anti-war message with prescient warnings about the rising dangers of the dictatorship of Nazi Germany, it was intended to be a powerful and controversial picture, and Universal entrusted it to its finest director, James Whale.

The novel on which the film is based was banned by Nazi Germany. When the film was made, Universal Pictures was threatened with a boycott of all their films by the German government unless the anti-Nazi sentiments in the script were watered down. Carl Laemmle and his son, Carl Laemmle, Jr., the former heads of Universal, had recently been ousted by a corporate takeover. The new studio heads, fearing financial loss, caved in to Nazi pressure and the film was partially reshot with another director, and the remainder extensively re-edited, leaving it a pale shadow of Whale's original intentions. To the director's further displeasure, writer Charles Kenyon was ordered to interject the script with comedy scenes between Andy Devine and Slim Summerville, which Whale found unsuitable. Disgusted with the studio's cowardice under its new management, Whale left Universal after completing Wives Under Suspicion, an unsuccessful remake of his own The Kiss Before the Mirror. He returned two years later to direct Green Hell, but never made another film for Universal after that.

== Plot ==
A squad of German machine gunners on the Western Front discuss when the Great War will end; the corporal shows the squad his calendar, revealing tomorrow is November 11, 1918. The squad's company launches an assault on French lines, and despite the heavy casualties sustained by both sides, the Germans manage to secure a trench; unbeknownst to the soldiers, the Armistice is being signed at the same time. The squad, in the presence of their aristocratic captain, hears of the Armistice just after 11 am.

With the war over, the Germans leave the line and march home to Germany. On their way back they run into members of the American Expeditionary Forces and exchange cigarettes and food. The Germans feel as if both sides are fools for killing one another when they get along so easily. When they enter a small French hamlet, they get word of the German Revolution. The platoon medic raves about how the soldiers are in charge, and the captain removes his stripes. However, most of the soldiers do not care for the Revolution. The captain remains in charge until the remnants of the company reach Germany.

German soldiers who survived the Western Front struggled to adjust to civilian life in the months following the war. The corporal makes a fortunate marriage. The lieutenant is attacked while still wearing his uniform and medals by a gang of socialist revolutionaries and is saved from death by the rest of the squad, before discovering that the woman he believed was his fiancée has been cheating on him with a man who avoided military service and made a fortune as a war profiteer. At least some are experiencing what is now known as PTSD. All find that Germany changed tremendously while they were at the front.

The betrayed soldier kills the wealthy war profiteer and is tried for murder. Several of his fellow soldiers speak in his defense. The soldiers express their belief that the older generation is responsible for the war. They believe the soldier who killed the profiteer was not wrong in doing so because he was not the soldier's first kill; rather, they say it was the only kill where the person meant to harm him. They argue that it is insanity to believe someone can come back from four years of killing and expect to be normal just from the word peace. The last few moments of the movie are used to express concern with global rearmament.

== Cast ==
- John King as Ernst
- Richard Cromwell as Ludwig
- Slim Summerville as Tjaden
- Andy Devine as Willy
- Barbara Read as Lucie
- Louise Fazenda as Angelina
- Noah Beery Jr. as Wessling
- Maurice Murphy as Albert
- John Emery as Von Hagen
- Etienne Girardot as Mayor
- Lionel Atwill as Prosecutor
- Henry Hunter as Bethke
- Larry J. Blake as Weil
- Gene Garrick as Geisicke
- Jean Rouverol as Elsa
- Marilyn Harris as Maria (as Hedwig Ibsen)
- Spring Byington as Ernst's Mother
- Frank Reicher as Ernst's Father
- Arthur Hohl as Heinrich
- William B. Davidson as Bartscher
- Al Shean as Mr. Markheim
- Edwin Maxwell as Principal
- Clara Blandick as Willy's Mother
- Samuel S. Hinds as Defense Attorney
- Robert Warwick as Judge
- Harry Cording as Attendant (uncredited)
- D'Arcy Corrigan as Cab Driver (uncredited)
- Francis Ford as Street Cleaner (uncredited)
- Dwight Frye as Small Man at Rally (uncredited)
- Edward LeSaint as Porter (uncredited)
- Bob McKenzie as Barber (uncredited)
- Edward Van Sloan as President (uncredited)

== Production ==
The film was budgeted at $800,000 but went over budget.

Specialist marksman George Daly (1888–1937), an ex-Marine who fired machine gun live ammunition at actors, died in a stunt explosion during the opening battle scenes. He had taken out a $10,000 life insurance policy two weeks before the accident.

== Critical reception ==
Frank S. Nugent of The New York Times panned the film, calling it "an approximation of the novel; it is touched occasionally with the author's bleak spirit. But most of the time it goes its own Hollywooden-head way, playing up the comedy, melodramatizing rather than dramatizing, reaching at last toward a bafflingly inconclusive conclusion ... It is distressing to watch the mutilation of a great theme." Variety called Whale's direction "excellent" but found the story "an emasculated scenario without a strong finish". Harrison's Reports wrote that given the material, the producers "should have turned out a stirring dramatic account of the difficulties for men, just back from war, in readjusting themselves. Instead of dwelling on these difficulties and arousing the audience's sympathy, the producers saw fit to stress the comedy angle, and to such a point that it weakens the picture's dramatic quality." John Mosher of The New Yorker thought the task of adapting the novel for the screen was a challenging one and gave Whale credit for handling some of the film's "difficulties with tact", but found the comedy element "confusing, almost embarrassing. Also it is definitely not German, and, along with the very American boys of the cast, the essential atmosphere is often bewildering. It's neither German nor anything else—just studio nether world."

Writing for Night and Day in 1937, Graham Greene gave the film a poor review, describing it briefly as "an awful film, one big Mother's Day, celebrated by American youth, plump, adolescent faces with breaking sissy voices". Greene's chief complaint was of the American mischaracterization of German war experiences, and he noted that the film "might be funny if it wasn't horrifying. [-] America seeing the world in its own image".

Sky Movies wrote, "a somewhat belated sequel to All Quiet on the Western Front, Universal's critically and commercially acclaimed anti-war drama, The Road Back didn't enjoy the same success...The strong statement Whale wanted to make was seen by some reviewers, but this original cut was withdrawn. It's a shame the film hasn't been restored to its former glory as it would be as much a classic as its illustrious predecessor." Leonard Maltin has called it a "heavy-handed sequel...interesting to watch but unsatisfying." However, TV Guide noted, "some of Whale's film does show through...The battle scenes are still powerful, and a special traveling crane was developed to shoot them, a gadget the director was so enamored of that he used it throughout the film."

== Box office ==
Despite the film's negative reviews and production problems, it was one of the top-grossing films of 1936–37.

== See also ==
- List of films cut over the director's opposition
- List of incomplete or partially lost films
