= One More River (novel) =

1933 novel

- First US edition
- Author: John Galsworthy
- Language: English
- Genre: Drama
- Publisher: Heinemann (UK); Scribners (US)
- Publication date: 1933
- Publication place: United Kingdom
- Media type: Print

One More River is a 1933 novel by the British writer John Galsworthy. It was the final book in the Forsyte Chronicles, an extended series of novels of which The Forsyte Saga are the best known.

== Film adaptation ==
The following year it was adapted into a film of the same title by Universal Pictures. Directed by James Whale it starred Diana Wynyard, Colin Clive and Frank Lawton.

== Bibliography ==
- Gindin, James. John Galsworthy's Life and Art: An Alien's Fortress. Springer, 1987.
- Goble, Alan. The Complete Index to Literary Sources in Film. Walter de Gruyter, 1999.
