= Journey's End (2017 film) =

2017 British film by Saul Dibb

- British release poster
- Directed by: Saul Dibb
- Written by: Simon Reade
- Based on: Journey's End by R. C. Sherriff
- Produced by: Guy de Beaujeu; Simon Reade
- Starring: Sam Claflin; Asa Butterfield; Paul Bettany; Tom Sturridge; Toby Jones
- Cinematography: Laurie Rose
- Edited by: Tania Reddin
- Music by: Natalie Holt; Hildur Guðnadóttir
- Production company: Fluidity Films
- Distributed by: Lionsgate
- Release dates: 8 September 2017 (TIFF); 2 February 2018 (United Kingdom)
- Running time: 103 minutes
- Country: United Kingdom
- Language: English
- Box office: $1 million

Journey's End is a 2017 British war film based on the 1928 play by R. C. Sherriff. Written by Simon Reade and directed by Saul Dibb, it was screened in the "Special Presentations" section at the 2017 Toronto International Film Festival.

The film is the fifth film adaptation of the play, following Journey's End (1930), the German production of The Other Side (1931), the Anglo-French production Aces High (1976), and BBC TV's Journey's End (1988).

== Plot ==
During the First World War, young Second Lieutenant Raleigh is sent to the front lines in Northern France. He requests of General Raleigh, his uncle, that he be put under the command of Captain Stanhope of C Company, a man who was a few years his senior at school, and who used to holiday with Raleigh and his sister Margaret.

Although an outstanding leader, who won the Military Cross at the Battle of Vimy Ridge, Stanhope has taken to heavy drinking to numb himself to the horrors of war. Other company officers include the kindly second-in-command, Lieutenant Osborne, an older man who is called 'Uncle' by his fellow officers; Trotter, also an older man of lower social class commissioned from the ranks to make up shortages; and Hibbert, whose attempts to escape the front line by complaining of eye pain are angrily rejected by Stanhope. The officers work as a close team, sitting down to a three-course dinner each evening (in practice whatever soup, tinned meat and tinned fruit the mess cook has rustled up – in contrast to the fine meals which more senior officers are shown eating behind the front). Raleigh learns his duties, making frequent inspections of the trenches, supervising the morning "stand to" (guarding the trench in case of a dawn attack) and learning the names of his men.

At any moment the Germans could launch an attack in what would come to be known as the German spring offensive. The battalion commander informs Stanhope that information from a deserter reveals that the German assault is planned for Thursday 21 March 1918. To obtain intelligence for a brigadier who is visiting for dinner, the battalion commander orders Stanhope to send two of his officers and ten men on a daytime raid across no man's land to capture one or more German prisoners. The officers chosen are the trusted Lieutenant Osborne and Second Lieutenant Raleigh. Only four men and Raleigh return alive, with one prisoner, revealing the Germans opposite to be a unit from Württemberg.

Stanhope is absolutely devastated by Osborne's death, and drinks heavily, culminating in a physical altercation with Raleigh.

On 21 March, all men are on duty as the shelling begins. The British soldiers can barely see or hold on to their weapons through all the dust and debris. Raleigh is severely wounded in the back. Stanhope lays him on a bed in the officers' dugout. Ignoring urgent messages from the sergeant-major to come up to the trench and take charge, he comforts the dying man and covers him with a blanket just as Raleigh complains of being "too cold" and breathes his last breath. Stanhope emerges in shock as the artillery explodes around him.

The next day, the Germans, in gas masks, are seen surveying the captured trenches, with the bodies of the British strewn around dead and motionless. Meanwhile, back at home, Margaret finally receives a letter from her brother, sent just after his arrival at the front.

== Cast ==
- Asa Butterfield – Second Lieutenant Raleigh
- Sam Claflin – Captain Stanhope
- Paul Bettany – Lieutenant 'Uncle' Osborne
- Tom Sturridge – Second Lieutenant Hibbert
- Toby Jones – Private Mason (The Cook)
- Stephen Graham – Second Lieutenant Trotter
- Robert Glenister – The Colonel
- Andy Gathergood – The Company Sergeant Major
- Miles Jupp – Captain Hardy
- Jack Holden – Bert Turner (Cook's helper)
- Eirik Bar – Soldat Ernst Schäfer (German prisoner)

== Production ==
=== Development ===
The proposed film was first announced in 2014, with the intention that it would be part of the British commemoration of the First World War centenary. It was to be produced by Guy De Beaujeu, and was originally planned to be directed by David Grindley, who had previously directed a frequently revived stage production of the play.

=== Writing ===
Although the screenplay is based on the play by R. C. Sherriff, a dozen new characters were introduced by writer Simon Reade for this screen adaptation.

=== Casting ===
The film's producer confirmed that the ideal cast might include Benedict Cumberbatch, Tom Hiddleston and Eddie Redmayne, but that no actors had yet been approached. Further press information in December 2016 announced that the cast would include Paul Bettany, Tom Sturridge and Toby Jones, and that the film was due for release in 2017.

=== Filming ===
The production was made at Pinewood Studios Wales, Cardiff in Wales and on location in Suffolk, England.

== Release ==
Journey's End was released on 8 September 2017. The film received a wider theatrical release in Spring 2018, the centenary of the German spring offensive, the events of the German attacks which it depicts.

== Reception ==
Review aggregator website Rotten Tomatoes gives the film a score of 91% based on 102 reviews. The website's critics consensus reads, "Journey's End brings R.C. Sherriff's 90-year-old play to the screen with thrilling power, thanks to director Saul Dibb's hard-hitting urgency and brilliant work from a talented cast." On Metacritic the film has a score of 73 out of 100 based on reviews from 28 critics, indicating "generally favorable reviews".

Todd McCarthy of The Hollywood Reporter commented that "the film serves to illuminate how very different the British army – or any army – was then, with its class distinctions and comparatively polite conversational modes, and how differently wars are now fought." Dennis Harvey of Variety said, "The convincing physical production is shot in muddy earthtones by Laurie Rose and is well accentuated by an original score of urgent, mournful strings."

Simran Hans of The Observer gave the film 3 stars out of 5 and writing, "Sam Claflin is particularly good as the boozy, brooding Captain Stanhope, whose intensity, belligerence and self-loathing flesh out what might in less capable hands have been a clichéd, shell-shocked soldier." Peter Bradshaw of The Guardian gave the film 4 stars out of 5, calling it "expertly cast and really well acted: forthright, powerful, heartfelt".
