= Journey's End =

1929 play by R. C. Sherriff

- Brentano's Publisher's first edition, 1929
- Original language: English
- Written by: R. C. Sherriff
- Genre: Drama
- Setting: British trenches in the days before Operation Michael during the First World War

Premiere
- Date: 9 December 1928
- Place: Apollo Theatre; London, England

Journey's End is a 1928 dramatic play by English playwright R. C. Sherriff, set in the trenches near Saint-Quentin, Aisne, towards the end of the First World War. The story plays out in the officers' dugout of a British Army infantry company from 18 to 21 March 1918, providing a glimpse of the officers' lives in the last few days before Operation Michael.

The play was first performed at the Apollo Theatre in London by the Incorporated Stage Society on 9 December 1928, starring a young Laurence Olivier, and soon moved to other West End theatres for a two-year run. It was included in Burns Mantle's The Best Plays of 1928–1929. The piece quickly became internationally popular, with numerous productions and tours in English and other languages. A 1930 film version was followed by other adaptations, and the play set a high standard for other works dealing with similar themes, and influenced playwrights including Noël Coward. It was Sherriff's seventh play. He considered calling it Suspense or Waiting, but eventually found a title in the closing line of a chapter of an unidentified book, "It was late in the evening when we came at last to our journey's end."

== Plot summary ==
=== Act I ===
Monday, 18 March 1918: evening. In the British trenches facing Saint-Quentin, Captain Hardy converses with Lieutenant Osborne, an older man and public school master, who has come to relieve him. Hardy jokes about the behaviour of Captain Stanhope, who has turned to alcohol to cope with the stress that the war has caused him. While Hardy jokes, Osborne defends Stanhope and describes him as "the best company commander we've got".

Private Mason, a servant cook, often forgets about ingredients and key parts of the food that he prepares for the officers. He is really part of the infantry but the company has let him be a part-time cook.

Second Lieutenant Trotter is an overweight officer commissioned from the ranks who likes his food; he cannot stand the war and counts down each hour that he serves in the front line by drawing circles onto a piece of paper and then colouring them in.

Second Lieutenant James "Jimmy" Raleigh is a young and naive officer who joins the company. Raleigh knew Stanhope from school, where Stanhope was skipper at rugby; Raleigh refers to Stanhope as Dennis. He also has a sister whom Stanhope is dating.

Raleigh admits that he requested to be sent to Stanhope's company. Osborne hints to Raleigh that Stanhope will not be the same person he knew from school, as the experiences of war have changed him; however, Raleigh does not seem to understand.

Stanhope is angry that Raleigh has been allowed to join him and describes the boy as a hero-worshipper. As Stanhope is in a relationship with Raleigh's sister Madge, he is concerned that Raleigh will write home and inform his sister of Stanhope's drinking. Stanhope tells Osborne that he will censor Raleigh's letters so this will not happen; Osborne does not approve.

Stanhope has a keen sense of duty and feels that he must continue to serve rather than take leave to which he is entitled. He criticises another soldier, Second Lieutenant Hibbert, whom he thinks is faking neuralgia in the eye so that he can be sent home instead of continuing fighting.

Osborne puts a tired and somewhat drunk Stanhope to bed. Stanhope, as well as the other officers, refers to Osborne as "Uncle".

=== Act II ===
==== Scene 1 ====
Tuesday, 19 March 1918: morning. Trotter and Mason converse about the bacon rashers which the company has to eat. Trotter talks about how the start of spring makes him feel youthful; he also talks about the hollyhocks which he has planted. These conversations are a way of escaping the trenches and the reality of the war.

Osborne and Raleigh discuss how slowly time passes at the front, and the fact that both of them played rugby before the war and that Osborne was a schoolmaster before he signed up to fight. While Raleigh appears interested, Osborne points out that it is of little use now.

Osborne describes the madness of war when describing how German soldiers allowed the British to rescue a wounded soldier in no man's land, while the next day the two sides shelled each other heavily. He describes the war as "silly".

Stanhope announces that the barbed wire around the trenches needs to be mended. Information gathered from a captured German indicates that an enemy attack is planned to begin on Thursday morning, only two days away.

Stanhope confiscates a letter from Raleigh, insisting on his right to censor it. Stanhope is in a relationship with Raleigh's sister and is worried that, in the letter, Raleigh will reveal Stanhope's growing alcoholism. Full of self-loathing, Stanhope accedes to Osborne's offer to read the letter for him. The letter is, in fact, full of praise for Stanhope. The scene ends with Stanhope quietly demurring from Osborne's suggestion to re-seal the envelope.

==== Scene 2 ====
Tuesday, 19 March 1918: afternoon. In a meeting with the Sergeant Major it is announced that the attack is taking place on Thursday. Stanhope and the Sergeant-Major discuss battle plans. The Colonel relays orders that the General wants a raid to take place on the German trench prior to the attack, "a surprise daylight raid", all previous raids having been made under cover of darkness, and that they want to be informed of the outcome by 7 p.m. Stanhope states that such a plan is absurd, and that the General and his staff merely want this so their dinner will not be delayed.

The Colonel agrees with Stanhope but says that orders are orders, and they must be obeyed. Later, it is stated that in a similar raid, after the British artillery bombardment, the Germans had tied red rag to the gaps in the barbed wire so that their soldiers knew exactly where to train their machine guns.

It is decided that Osborne and Raleigh will be the officers to go on the raid, despite the fact that Raleigh has only recently entered the war.

Hibbert complains to Stanhope about the neuralgia he states he has been suffering from. Stanhope replies: "it would be better to die from the pain, than from being shot for desertion". Hibbert maintains that he does have neuralgia and the right to leave the battlefield to seek treatment, but when Stanhope threatens to shoot him if he goes, Hibbert breaks down crying. He says "Go on then, shoot!", suggesting that he would rather die than stay on the battlefield. The two soldiers admit to each other that they feel exactly the same way, and are struggling to cope with the stresses that the war is putting on them. Stanhope comforts Hibbert by saying they can go on duty together.

Osborne reads aloud to Trotter from Lewis Carroll's Alice's Adventures in Wonderland; another attempt to escape from the realities of the war. The scene ends with the idealistic Raleigh, who is untouched by the war, stating that it is "frightfully exciting" that he has been picked for the raid.

=== Act III ===
==== Scene 1 ====
Wednesday, 20 March 1918: afternoon. There is confirmation that the raid is still going ahead. The Colonel states that a German soldier needs to be captured so that intelligence can be extracted from him. Osborne admits to Stanhope that he knows he is probably not coming back, and asks Stanhope to look after his most cherished possessions and send them to his wife if he does not return after the raid. In the minutes before going over the top, Raleigh and Osborne talk about home – the New Forest and the town of Lyndhurst – to pass the time. Smoke-bombs are fired, the soldiers move towards the German trench, and a young German soldier is captured. However, Stanhope finds out that Osborne has been killed although Raleigh has survived.

Stanhope sarcastically states, "How awfully nice – if the Brigadier's pleased", when the Colonel's first concern is whether information has been gathered, not whether all the soldiers have returned safely. Six of ten other ranks have been killed.

==== Scene 2 ====
Wednesday, 20 March 1918: night. Trotter, Stanhope, and Hibbert drink and talk about women. They all appear to be enjoying themselves until Hibbert is annoyed when Stanhope tells him to go to bed, and he tells Stanhope to go to bed instead, then Stanhope suddenly becomes angry and begins to shout at Hibbert, and tells him to clear off and get out.

Stanhope also becomes angry at Raleigh, who did not eat with the officers that night but preferred to eat with his men. Stanhope is offended by this, and Raleigh eventually admits that he feels he cannot eat while he thinks that Osborne is dead, and his body is in no man's land. Stanhope is angry because Raleigh had seemed to imply that Stanhope did not care about Osborne's death because Stanhope was eating and drinking. Stanhope yells at Raleigh that he drinks to cope with the fact that Osborne died, to forget. Stanhope asks to be left alone and angrily tells Raleigh to leave.

==== Scene 3 ====
Thursday, 21 March 1918: towards dawn. The German attack on the British trenches approaches, and the Sergeant Major tells Stanhope they should expect heavy losses. When it arrives, Hibbert is reluctant to get out of bed and into the trenches.

A message is relayed to Stanhope telling him that Raleigh has been injured by a shell and that his spine is damaged, meaning he cannot move his legs. Stanhope orders that Raleigh be brought into his dugout. He comforts Raleigh while Raleigh lies in bed. Raleigh says that he is cold and that it is becoming dark; Stanhope moves the candle to the bed and goes deeper into the dugout to fetch a blanket, but, by the time he returns, Raleigh has died.

The shells continue to explode in the background. Stanhope receives a message that he is needed. He gets up to leave and, after he has exited, a mortar hits the dugout causing it to collapse and entomb Raleigh's corpse.

== Productions (professional) ==
Sherriff had trouble getting Journey's End produced in the West End, writing that "Every management in London had turned the play down. They said people didn't want war plays [...] 'How can I put on a play with no leading lady?' one [theatre manager] had asked complainingly." Sherriff used No Leading Lady as the title of his autobiography, published in 1968.

Geoffrey Dearmer of the Incorporated Stage Society suggested that Sherriff send the script to George Bernard Shaw, because a good word from him would convince the ISS committee to stage it. Shaw replied that, like other sketches of trench life, it was a "useful [corrective] to the romantic conception of war", and that "As a 'slice of life' – horribly abnormal life – I should say let it be performed by all means".

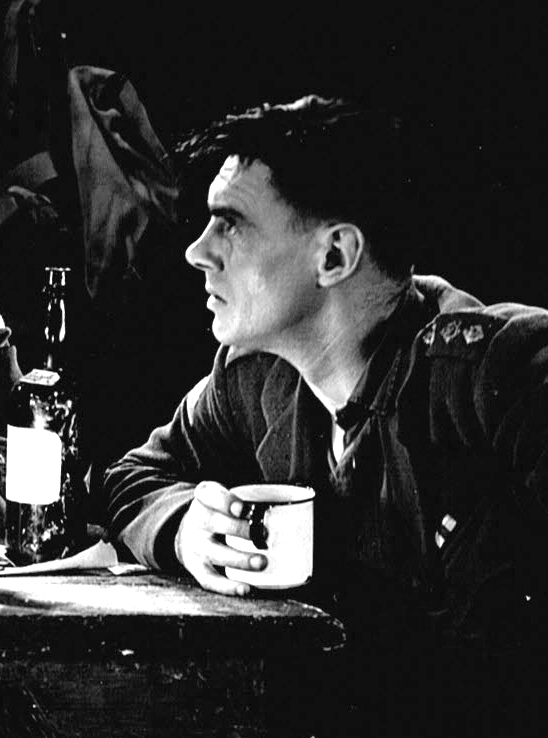
Colin Clive as Stanhope in the 1929 production of Journey's End, directed by James Whale

Journey's End opened as a semi-staged production running for two nights at the Apollo Theatre. It starred Laurence Olivier, then only 21, offered the role of Stanhope by the then equally unknown director James Whale. Under a new producer, Maurice Browne, the play soon transferred to the Savoy Theatre where it ran for three weeks starting on 21 January 1929. The entire cast from the Apollo reprised their roles (George Zucco playing Osborne and Maurice Evans Raleigh) except for Olivier, who had secured another role and was replaced by Colin Clive as Stanhope. The play was extremely well received: in the words of Whale's biographer James Curtis, it "managed to coalesce, at the right time and in the right manner, the impressions of a whole generation of men who were in the war and who had found it impossible, through words or deeds, to adequately express to their friends and families what the trenches had been like". It transferred to the Prince of Wales Theatre, where it ran for a further two years.

Whale travelled to the United States to direct the Broadway production in 1930 at Henry Miller's Theatre. Colin Keith-Johnston played Stanhope, and Leon Quartermaine Osborne. By late 1929 the work was played by 14 companies in English and 17 in other languages, in London, New York, Paris (in English), Stockholm, Berlin, Rome, Vienna, Madrid, and Budapest, and in Canada, Australia, and South Africa. The first revival of the work was in 1934, with Horne, Stoker and Smith reprising their original roles, and Reginald Tate as Stanhope. The first New York revival was in 1939, with Keith-Johnston again playing Stanhope. There were further London revivals in 1950 (which won enthusiastic praise from Field Marshal Montgomery) and 1972. The play was staged as the final production of the Edinburgh Gateway Company during the Edinburgh International Festival in August 1965.

In 2004, the play was again revived in London, directed by David Grindley. From its initial twelve-week season at the Comedy Theatre from January 2004, it transferred to the Playhouse Theatre and the Duke of York's Theatre, finally closing on 18 February 2005. A touring company took the same production to over 30 venues across Britain in 2004 and 2005 and back to London, to the New Ambassadors Theatre from September 2005 to January 2006.

Grindley's production received its Broadway debut in 2007. Starring Hugh Dancy, Boyd Gaines, Jefferson Mays and Stark Sands, it opened in New York at the Belasco Theatre on 22 February 2007 and closed on 10 June after 125 performances. Grindley's production was revived in 2011 for a UK tour from March to June, and transferred to the Duke of York's Theatre in the West End from July to September. The Sell A Door Theatre Company ran this play at the Greenwich Theatre until 17 February 2013. During 2014 it was presented at the Octagon Theatre, Bolton; directed by David Thacker, it featured David Birrell, Richard Graham and, as Stanhope, James Dutton.

=== Casts ===
==== 1928 ====
- Captain Hardy – David Horne
- Lieutenant Osborne – George Zucco
- Private Mason – Alexander Field
- 2nd Lieutenant Raleigh – Maurice Evans
- Captain Stanhope – Laurence Olivier
- 2nd Lieutenant Trotter – Melville Cooper
- 2nd Lieutenant Hibbert – Robert Speaight
- The Colonel – H. G. Stoker
- The Company Sergeant Major – Reginald Smith
- A German Soldier – Geoffrey Wincott
- Lance-Corporal Broughton – Richard Caldicot

==== 2011 tour and West End revival ====
- Hardy/Sergeant Major – Tim Chipping
- Osborne – Dominic Mafham
- Mason – Tony Turner
- Raleigh – Graham Butler
- Stanhope – James Norton
- Trotter – Christian Patterson
- Hibbert – Simon Harrison
- Colonel – Nigel Hastings
- Private – Daniel Hanna
- German Soldier – Andy Daniel
- Broughton – Mike Hayley

In the second part of the 2011 tour, after the West End run, Nick Hendrix took over the role of Stanhope and Simon Dutton the role of Osborne.

== Productions (amateur) ==
Over the years there have been numerous amateur productions, the all-male cast making the play a particularly attractive choice for boys' schools, scout troops and other all-male environments. The British Scout Association owns a share of the rights to the play.

During the 1930s, the Pavilion Theatre in Selsey, Sussex, staged several productions of Journey's End. Sherriff (who had a holiday home nearby) attended a rehearsal in 1933, and advised the cast before his departure to Hollywood.

On 15 April 1939, Dirk Bogarde's first starring role was as Raleigh in a production of Journey's End with Newick Amateur Dramatic Society in Sussex.

In January 1944, during the Second World War, a production was staged by members of the Royal Natal Carbineers at El Khatatba, Egypt. Other productions were staged by British prisoners in Changi Prison, Singapore (February 1943); at Tamarkan, Thailand, a Japanese labour camp on the Burma Railway (July 1943); in Stalag 344, near Lamsdorf, Germany (July 1944); and in Campo P.G. 75, near Bari, Italy.

In 2015 the Shute Theatre and Arts Guild (STAG) staged a production of the play in St Michael's Church, Shute, Devon, directed by Elisabeth Miller.

In August 2018 a production was staged to commemorate the end of the First World War at St John's School, Leatherhead, and the Leatherhead Theatre, directed by Graham Pountney.

In September 2018 a production was staged by Fintry Amateur Dramatic Society (FADS), in "The Studio", a converted barn outside Killearn, Stirling.

In June 2026 a production was staged by the Didsbury Players ADS in Didsbury, Manchester, directed by Lauren Crouch.

== Adaptations ==
=== Film ===
In 1930, James Whale directed a film of the same name, based on the play, starring Colin Clive, David Manners and Ian Maclaren. A German remake, The Other Side (Die andere Seite), was directed by Heinz Paul in 1931. The play is the basis for the film Aces High (1976), although the action was switched from the infantry to the Royal Flying Corps. A second namesake British film adaptation was released in 2017, with a wider theatrical release in the spring of 2018.

=== Television ===
The play was televised by the BBC Television Service, live from its Alexandra Palace studios, on 11 November 1937, in commemoration of Armistice Day. Condensed into a one-hour version by the producer George More O'Ferrall, some short sequences from the film Westfront 1918 (1930) by G. W. Pabst were used for scene-setting purposes. Reginald Tate starred as Stanhope, with Basil Gill as Osborne, Norman Pierce as Trotter, Wallace Douglas as Raleigh, J. Neil More as the Colonel, R. Brooks Turner as the Company Sergeant-Major, Alexander Field as Mason, Reginald Smith as Hardy, and Olaf Olsen as the young German soldier. Because it was broadcast live, and the technology to record television programmes did not exist at the time, no visual records of the production survive other than still photographs.

The play was adapted for television in 1988, starring Jeremy Northam as Stanhope, Edward Petherbridge as Osborne, and Timothy Spall as Trotter. It held close to the original script although there were changes, the most obvious being the depiction on camera of the raid, which happens off-stage in the theatre production.

=== Radio ===
A radio adaptation by Peter Watts was produced for BBC Radio 4's Saturday Night Theatre in November 1970, featuring Martin Jarvis as Captain Stanhope.

== Legacy ==
Other plays of the period dealing with the war tended to be judged by the standard of Journey's End. The play and its characters also influenced other writers. In 1930, Noël Coward briefly played the role of Stanhope while on tour in the Far East. He did not consider his performance successful, writing afterwards that his audience "politely watched me take a fine part in a fine play and throw it into the alley." However, he was "strongly affected by the poignancy of the play itself", and was inspired to write Post-Mortem, his own "angry little vilification of war", shortly afterwards.

An alternative-timeline version of Raleigh appears in the 1995 novel The Bloody Red Baron by Kim Newman. The final series of the British comedy programme Blackadder (Blackadder Goes Forth) focuses on the same theme and setting, sometimes with heavy parallels. In Withnail & I the out-of-work actor Marwood (played by Paul McGann) is seen reading a copy of the play in the holiday cottage and goes on to win a role in a touring production by the close of the film.

The play is part of the British GCSE English literature qualification that is studied and tested in secondary schools, specifically the Cambridge IGCSE and Pearson Edexcel IGCSE specifications for English.

== Awards and nominations ==
Awards

- Drama Desk Award for Outstanding Revival of a Play
- Tony Award for Best Revival of a Play

== Sources ==
- Coward, Noël (2008) [1937]. Present Indicative. London: Methuen. ISBN 978-0-413-77413-2.
- Gore-Langton, Robert (2013). Journey's End: the classic war play explored. London: Oberon. ISBN 9781849433952.
- Lesley, Cole (1976). The Life of Noel Coward. London: Jonathan Cape. ISBN 978-0-224-01288-1.
- Purkis, Charlotte (2016). "The mediation of constructions of pacifism in Journey's End and The Searcher, two contrasting dramatic memorials from the late 1920s". Journalism Studies. 17 (4): 502–16. doi:10.1080/1461670X.2015.1135753.
- Sherriff, R. C. (1929). Journey's End, a Play in Three Acts (First ed.). New York: Brentano's. OCLC 1490502.
- Walters, Emily Curtis (2016). "Between entertainment and elegy: the unexpected success of R. C. Sherriff's Journey's End (1928)". Journal of British Studies. 55 (2): 344–73. doi:10.1017/jbr.2016.3.
