= North of 36 =

1924 film

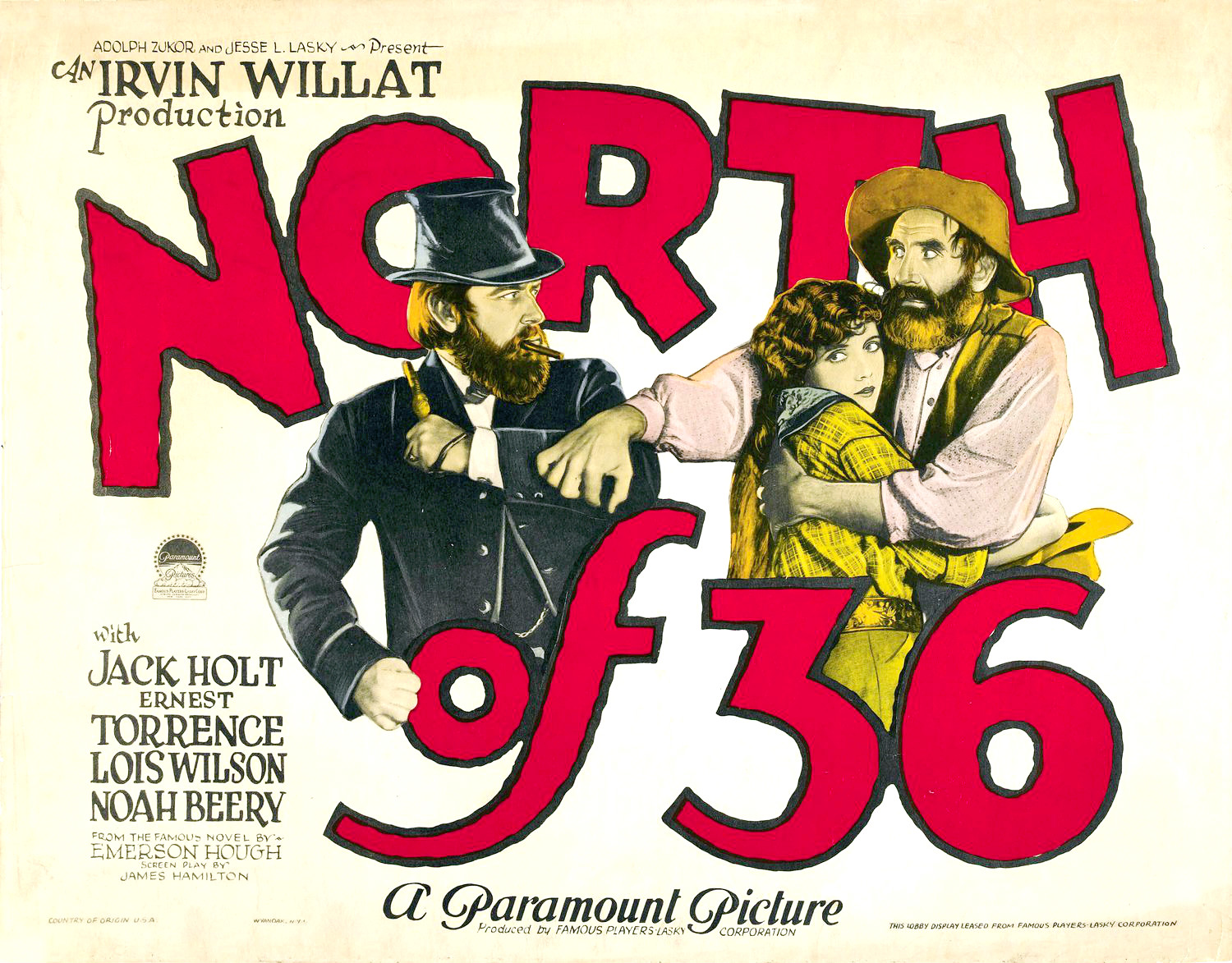
- Film poster
- Directed by: Irvin Willat
- Written by: Emerson Hough (novel:North of 36)
- Produced by: Adolph Zukor; Jesse L. Lasky
- Starring: Jack Holt; Lois Wilson; Ernest Torrence
- Cinematography: Alfred Gilks
- Distributed by: Paramount Pictures
- Release date: December 22, 1924
- Running time: 8 reels (7,908 feet)
- Country: United States
- Languages: Silent; English intertitles

North of 36 is a 1924 American silent Western film produced by Famous Players–Lasky and distributed by Paramount Pictures. The film is based on the novel, North of 36, by Emerson Hough. The film was directed by Irvin Willat and stars Jack Holt and Lois Wilson. This film was preserved in the Library of Congress in the 1970s and has been restored by that archive with a new screening of the restored film in the summer of 2011 in upstate New York.

== Plot ==
As described in a review in a film magazine, Sim Rudabaugh, ex-outlaw and Treasurer of Texas in the early days, plots to corner the script which represents the rich cattle lands. He particularly covets the last great ranch, owned by Taisie Lockhart. Taisie has not the money to pay her riders, but they refuse to be discharged. There comes Dan McMasters, whose father was an old friend of Lockhart's. He brings word that the railroad has been pushed through to Abilene. If they can get their cattle to the railhead, they can realize upon their potential riches — but it is a thousand miles across Indian country. Taisie decides to take the chance. Dan offers his escort, but circumstances raise the suspicion he and not Rudabaugh is trying to get Taisie's land-script. He is driven off and joins up with Rudabaugh, to spy upon his plans and foil his evil devices. During a night attack the cattle are stampeded but are stopped by the cowmen, headed by Jim Nabours, the foreman, and at last reach Abilene, where their arrival is made a gala event. Dan wins Taisie, Sim is given to the Comanche chief, whose wives he has slain, and Jim attains the longed for dignity of a boiled shirt.

== Cast ==
- Jack Holt as Don McMasters
- Ernest Torrence as Jim Nabours
- Lois Wilson as Taisie Lockheart
- Noah Beery as Slim Rudabaugh
- David Dunbar as Dell Williams
- Stephen Carr as Cinquo Centavos
- Guy Oliver as Major McCoyne
- William Carroll as Sanchez
- Clarence Geldart as Colonel Griswold
- George Irving as Pattison
- Ella Miller as Milly

== See also ==
- The Conquering Horde (1931)
- The Texans (1938)
