= The Texans =

1938 film by James P. Hogan

- Theatrical poster
- Directed by: James P. Hogan
- Screenplay by: Bertram Millhauser; Paul Sloane; William Wister Haines
- Based on: North of 36 by Emerson Hough
- Produced by: Lucien Hubbard
- Starring: Joan Bennett; Randolph Scott
- Cinematography: Theodor Sparkuhl
- Edited by: LeRoy Stone
- Music by: Gerard Carbonara (uncredited)
- Production company: Paramount Pictures
- Distributed by: Paramount Pictures
- Release date: August 12, 1938
- Running time: 92 minutes
- Country: United States
- Language: English
- Budget: over $1 million

The Texans is a 1938 American Western film directed by James P. Hogan and starring Joan Bennett and Randolph Scott. The screenplay was written by Bertram Millhauser, Paul Sloane and William Wister Haines and is based on the novel North of 36 by Emerson Hough.

Most of the exterior scenes were filmed about 30 miles (48 km) east of Cotulla, Texas, on the 35,000-acre (140 km^{2}) La Mota Ranch. Other scenes were filmed near Laredo, Texas. 2500 Texas Longhorns were used for the herd. Interior scenes were recorded at Paramount Studios in Hollywood. The Texans premiered at San Antonio's Majestic Theater on July 16, 1938.

== Plot ==
After the Civil War, the former Confederates of Texas are suffering under harsh taxes, ill treatment and corruption by the Federal Government during the Reconstruction era. Texas ranch owner, Ivy Preston accompanied by her grandmother Granna and her old ranch foreman now the trail boss Chuckawalla is trying to move her cattle to market to sell them. The carpetbaggers are not only trying to seize her cattle without payment but want her ranch as well for their own ends. Ivy's true love, former Confederate officer Alan Sanford is in Mexico with General Shelby's Expedition to Mexico.

A Confederate veteran named Kirk Jordan who has had enough of war and desires to make wealth in America becomes involved with her. He convinces her to drive her cattle to Abilene, Kansas rather than Mexico but he is upset with her when he learns she wants to use the money to help the South continue fighting. Their cattle drive fights the elements, the Comanche and the US Army who follow the orders of the carpetbaggers.

== Principal cast ==
- Joan Bennett as Ivy Preston
- Randolph Scott as Kirk Jordan
- May Robson as Granna
- Walter Brennan as Chuckawalla
- Robert Cummings as Alan Sanford
- Robert Barrat as Isaiah Middlebrack
- Raymond Hatton as Cal Tuttle
- Francis Ford as Uncle Dud
- Harvey Stephens as Lt. David Nichols
- Irving Bacon as Pvt. Collins

== See also ==
- North of 36 (1924)
- The Conquering Horde (1931)
- List of films and television shows about the American Civil War
