= Clive of India (film) =

1935 film by Richard Boleslawski

- Theatrical release poster
- Directed by: Richard Boleslawski
- Written by: W. P. Lipscomb; R. J. Minney
- Based on: Clive of India by R. J. Minney
- Produced by: William Goetz; Raymond Griffith
- Starring: Ronald Colman; Loretta Young; Colin Clive; Francis Lister
- Cinematography: J. Peverell Marley
- Edited by: Barbara McLean
- Music by: Alfred Newman
- Production company: Twentieth Century Pictures
- Distributed by: United Artists
- Release dates: January 25, 1935 (Nationally); January 17, 1935 (New York City premiere)
- Running time: 95 minutes
- Country: United States
- Language: English

Clive of India is a 1935 American historical biographical film starring Ronald Colman about the life of Robert Clive. It was based on R. J. Minney's play of the same name, and was co-written by Minney and W. P. Lipscomb and directed by Richard Boleslawski. Colin Clive, who appears in the film, was a descendant of Clive.

== Plot ==
In 1748, the British, French, Dutch and Portuguese are fighting over India.

Back in England, Robert Clive fires and misses in a duel; his opponent walks up to him, points his pistol at Clive's head and demands he retract his accusation of cheating. When Clive refuses, the other man declares him "mad" and leaves. Later, frustrated with the boredom of being a clerk, Clive recalls firing a pistol at his own head and having it misfire twice, only to have his friend fire it without a problem. This causes him to wonder if he is "destined for something after all."

He is sent to India in disgrace, still a clerk (for the East India Company at Fort St. George). He is fascinated by a picture of a beautiful woman in the locket of his friend and fellow clerk Edmund Maskelyne. He discovers that she is Edmund's sister and declares he wants to marry her, even though they have never even met. He later brazenly writes to her, asking her to come to India, a year-long journey.

When the French attack, Clive sees his destiny, as a soldier. The army is poorly manned and led. He persuades Edmund into transferring to the army as well. When the British are besieged in Trichinopoly, Clive sneaks out through the enemy lines without orders to confront the British Governor Pigot and his council. Finding they have no idea what to do, he offers to lift the siege, even though they can raise only 120 men, by attacking Arcot, the "capital of southern India". They agree. Clive sets out immediately with his small force, captures Arcot and raises the siege. In less than a year, he conquers all of southern India.

Margaret arrives, but is intimidated by his great success. His plans are unchanged, however, and they get married. They return to England to a magnificent London mansion. He wins a seat in Parliament, then loses it. Clive loses all his money showering (unwanted) luxuries on his wife and contesting elections. Fortunately, the East India Company wants him to return to India.

Colonel Clive demands the unconditional release of 146 British prisoners, but King of "Northern India" Suraj Ud Dowlah throws them into the "Black Hole of Calcutta"; only a handful survive the ordeal. Enraged, Clive makes a secret treaty with Suraj's uncle, Mir Jaffar, despite lacking the authority to do so. Royal Navy Admiral Watson refuses to sign the treaty, but Clive forges his signature.

Advancing against the enemy, Clive hesitates to cross a river, soon to be made impassible by the annual monsoon rains, without a firm commitment from Mir Jaffar. The governor and Edmund Maskelyne advise caution, and he reluctantly orders a retreat, but a supportive letter from his wife changes his mind, and Clive boldly leads his small army across. After much initial success, his men are about to be routed by Suraj's war elephants at the Battle of Plassey when Mir Jaffar finally commits his forces, ensuring victory.

Clive sails home to England to enjoy retirement on a country estate with his wife. However, Picot arrives with dire news: India is in chaos, all those Clive placed in power have been replaced by corrupt men, and Mir Jaffar has been deposed. Pigot offers Clive absolute authority to set things right. Clive accepts, but his decision comes at the cost of a rupture with his wife, who refuses to go with him.

Clive not only restores the situation, he expands the territories controlled by the British. However, all the men he got rid of travel to England and accuse him of accepting bribes. Clive defends himself, but to no avail. At this dark time, his wife returns to him. The Prime Minister himself brings the news: the verdict is not in his favour, but he will most likely be allowed to retain his wealth and honour. The Prime Minister also passes along the private praise of King George.

== Cast ==
- Ronald Colman as Robert Clive
- Loretta Young as Margaret Maskelyne
- Colin Clive as Capt. Johnstone
- Francis Lister as Edmund Maskelyne
- C. Aubrey Smith as Prime Minister
- Cesar Romero as Mir Jaffar
- Montagu Love as Governor Pigot
- Lumsden Hare as Sergeant Clark
- Ferdinand Munier as Admiral Watson
- Gilbert Emery as Mr. Sullivan
- Leo G. Carroll as Mr. Manning
- Etienne Girardot as Mr. Warburton
- Robert Greig as Mr. Pemberton
- Mischa Auer as Suraj Ud Dowlah
- Ferdinand Gottschalk as Old Member
- Doris Lloyd as Mrs. Nixon
- Edward Cooper as Clive's Butler
- Eily Malyon as Mrs. Clifford
- Joseph Tozer as Sir Frith
- Phyllis Clare as Margaret's Friend
- Leonard Mudie as General Burgoyne
- Phillip Dare as Captain George

== Reception ==
Andre Sennwald, critic for The New York Times, called the movie "a dignified and impressive historical drama which misses genuine distinction by a comfortable margin. ... the film divides its attentions—fatally, in the opinion of this reporter—between Clive's public triumphs and defeats and his intermittent quarrels with his wife, who wants him to settle down to the life of an English country gentleman." However, he thought that Colman "enacts the title rôle with vigor and conviction".

It was the 18th most popular film at the British box office in 1935–36.

== See also ==
- Great Britain in the Seven Years' War
