= The Conquering Horde =

1931 film

- Theatrical release poster
- Directed by: Edward Sloman
- Screenplay by: Emerson Hough (novel North of 36); Grover Jones; William Slavens McNutt
- Starring: Richard Arlen; Fay Wray; Claude Gillingwater; Ian Maclaren; Frank Rice; Arthur Stone; George Mendoza
- Cinematography: Archie Stout
- Edited by: Otho Lovering
- Music by: John Leipold; Ralph Rainger
- Production company: Paramount Pictures
- Distributed by: Paramount Pictures
- Release date: January 31, 1931
- Running time: 75 minutes
- Country: United States
- Language: English

The Conquering Horde is a 1931 American pre-Code Western directed by Edward Sloman and written by Emerson Hough, Grover Jones and William Slavens McNutt. The film stars Richard Arlen, Fay Wray, Claude Gillingwater, Ian Maclaren, Frank Rice, Arthur Stone and George Mendoza. The film was released on January 31, 1931, by Paramount Pictures. It was a remake of the 1924 silent film North of 36.

== Plot ==
Dan McMasters arrives in Texas from Washington to help establish a route for ranchers to get their cattle to market. He faces opposition from land barons who are accustomed to charging tolls for use of their land.

== Cast ==
- Richard Arlen as Dan McMasters
- Fay Wray as Taisie Lockhart
- Claude Gillingwater as Jim Nabours
- Ian Maclaren as Marvin Fletcher
- Frank Rice as Spud Grogan
- Arthur Stone as Lumpy Lorrigan
- George Mendoza as Cinco Centavos
- James Durkin as Amos Corley
- Charles Stevens as John
- Ed Brady as Splint Goggin
- Bob Kortman as Digger Hale
- Harry Cording as Butch Daggett
- Chief Standing Bear as White Cloud
- John Elliott as Captain Wilkins
- Kathrin Clare Ward as Mrs. Amos Corley

== Production ==
The railroad scenes were filmed on the Sierra Railroad in Tuolumne County, California.

== See also ==
- North of 36 (1924)
- The Texans (1938)
