= Journey's End (1930 film) =

1930 film

- Theatrical poster
- Directed by: James Whale
- Written by: R. C. Sherriff (play); Joseph Moncure March
- Produced by: George Pearson
- Starring: Colin Clive; Ian Maclaren; David Manners
- Cinematography: Benjamin H. Kline
- Edited by: Claude Berkeley
- Production companies: Gainsborough Pictures; Tiffany Pictures
- Distributed by: Tiffany Pictures (US); Woolf & Freedman Film Service (UK)
- Release dates: April 14, 1930 (UK); April 15, 1930 (U.S.)
- Running time: 120 minutes
- Countries: United Kingdom; United States

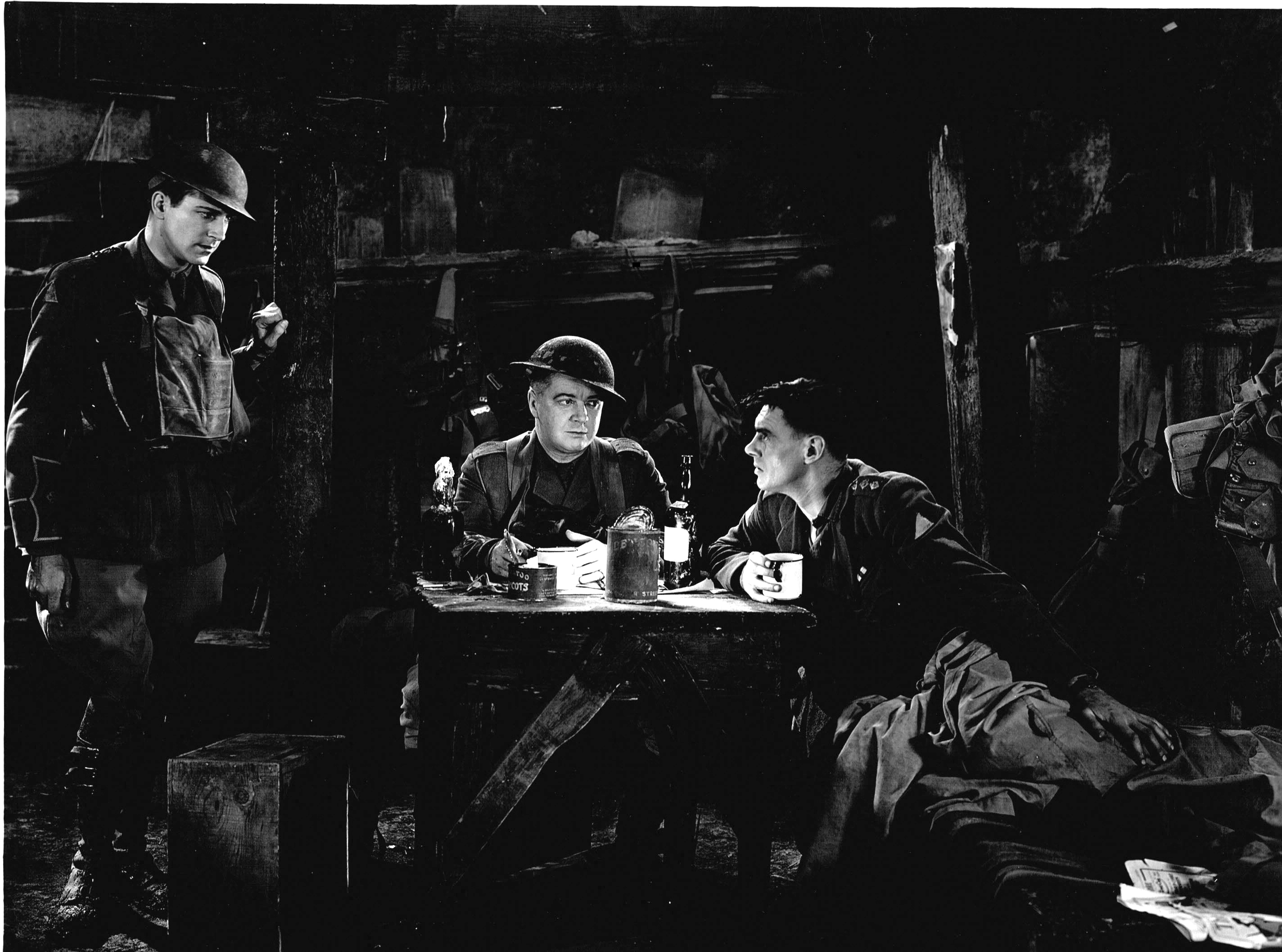
David Manners, Billy Bevan, and Colin Clive

Journey's End is a 1930 war film directed by James Whale. Based on the play of the same name by R. C. Sherriff, the film tells the story of several British army officers involved in trench warfare during the First World War. The film, like the play before it, was an enormous critical and commercial success and launched the film careers of Whale and several of its stars.

The following year there was a German film version The Other Side directed by Heinz Paul starring Conrad Veidt as Stanhope and Wolfgang Liebeneiner as Raleigh. The film was banned just weeks after the Nazis took power in 1933.

In 1976, the play was adapted again as Aces High with the scenario shifted to the British Royal Flying Corps. The play was adapted for film again with its original title and scenario in 2017.

== Plot ==
On the eve of a battle in 1918, a new officer, Second Lieutenant Raleigh, joins Captain Stanhope's company in the British trench lines in France. The two men knew each other at school: the younger Raleigh hero-worshipping Stanhope, while Stanhope has come to love Raleigh's sister. But the Stanhope whom Raleigh encounters now is a changed man who, after three years at the front, has turned to drink and seems close to a breakdown.

Stanhope is terrified that Raleigh will betray his decline to his sister, whom he hopes to marry after the war. An older officer, the avuncular Lieutenant Osborn, desperately tries to keep Stanhope from cracking. Osborn and Raleigh are selected to lead a raiding party on the German trenches where a number of the raiders are killed, including Osborn. Later, when Raleigh, too, is mortally wounded, Stanhope faces a desperate time as, grief-stricken and without close friends, he prepares to face another furious enemy attack.

Journey's End (1930)

== Cast ==
- Colin Clive as Captain Dennis Stanhope
- Ian Maclaren as Lieutenant Osborn
- David Manners as Second Lieutenant Raleigh
- Billy Bevan as Second Lieutenant Trotter
- Anthony Bushell as Second Lieutenant Hibbert
- Robert Adair as Captain Hardy
- Charles K. Gerrard as Private Mason
- Tom Whiteley as Sergeant Major
- Jack Pitcairn as Colonel
- Werner Klingler as German prisoner
- Gil Perkins as Sergeant Cox
- Leslie Sketchley as Corporal Ross

== Production ==
The play was hugely popular and many people were seeking the film rights, including Michael Balcon and Tommy Welsh. They decided to pool resources and bought the rights for £15,000. Because of a lack of facilities the film was made in Hollywood; this necessitated a deal with Tiffany Studios who had a 50% interest in the film although all key creative decisions lay with the British.

When Howard Hughes made the decision to turn Hell's Angels into a talkie, he hired a then-unknown James Whale, who had just arrived in Hollywood following a successful turn directing the play Journey's End in London and on Broadway, to direct the talking sequences; it was Whale's film debut, and arguably prepared him for the later success he would have with the feature version of Journey's End, Waterloo Bridge, and, most famously, the 1931 version of Frankenstein. Unhappy with the script, Whale brought in Joseph Moncure March to re-write it. Hughes later gave March the Luger pistol used in the film.

With production delayed while Hughes tinkered with the flying scenes in Hell's Angels, Whale managed to shoot his film adaptation of Journey's End and have it come out a month before Hell's Angels was released. The gap between completion of the dialogue scenes and completion of the aerial combat stunts allowed Whale to be paid, sail back to England, and begin work on the subsequent project, making Whale's actual (albeit uncredited) cinema debut, his "second" film to be released.
