= Charles Hadcock =

British sculptor (born 1965)

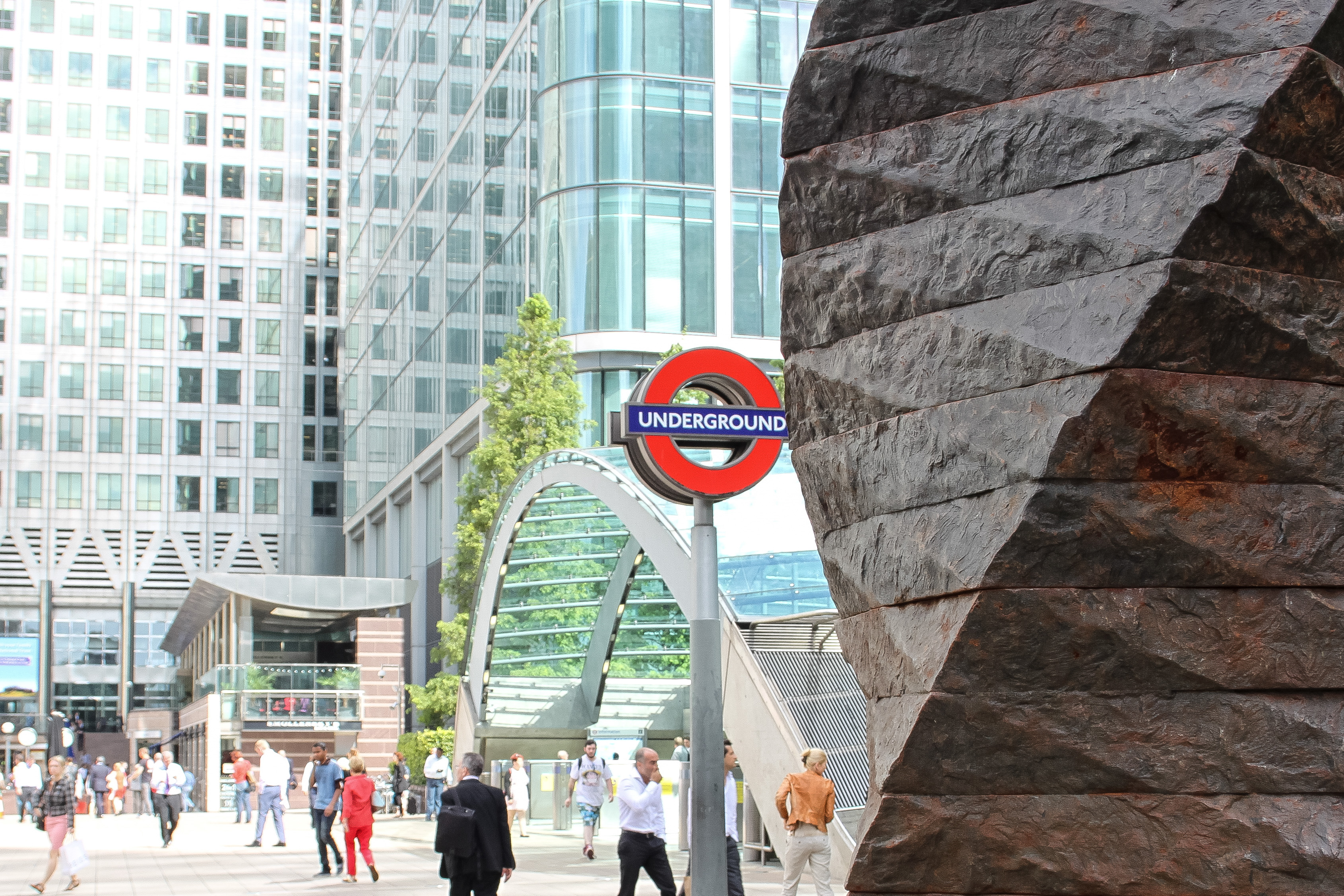
Torsion II by Charles Hadcock in Canary Wharf, London

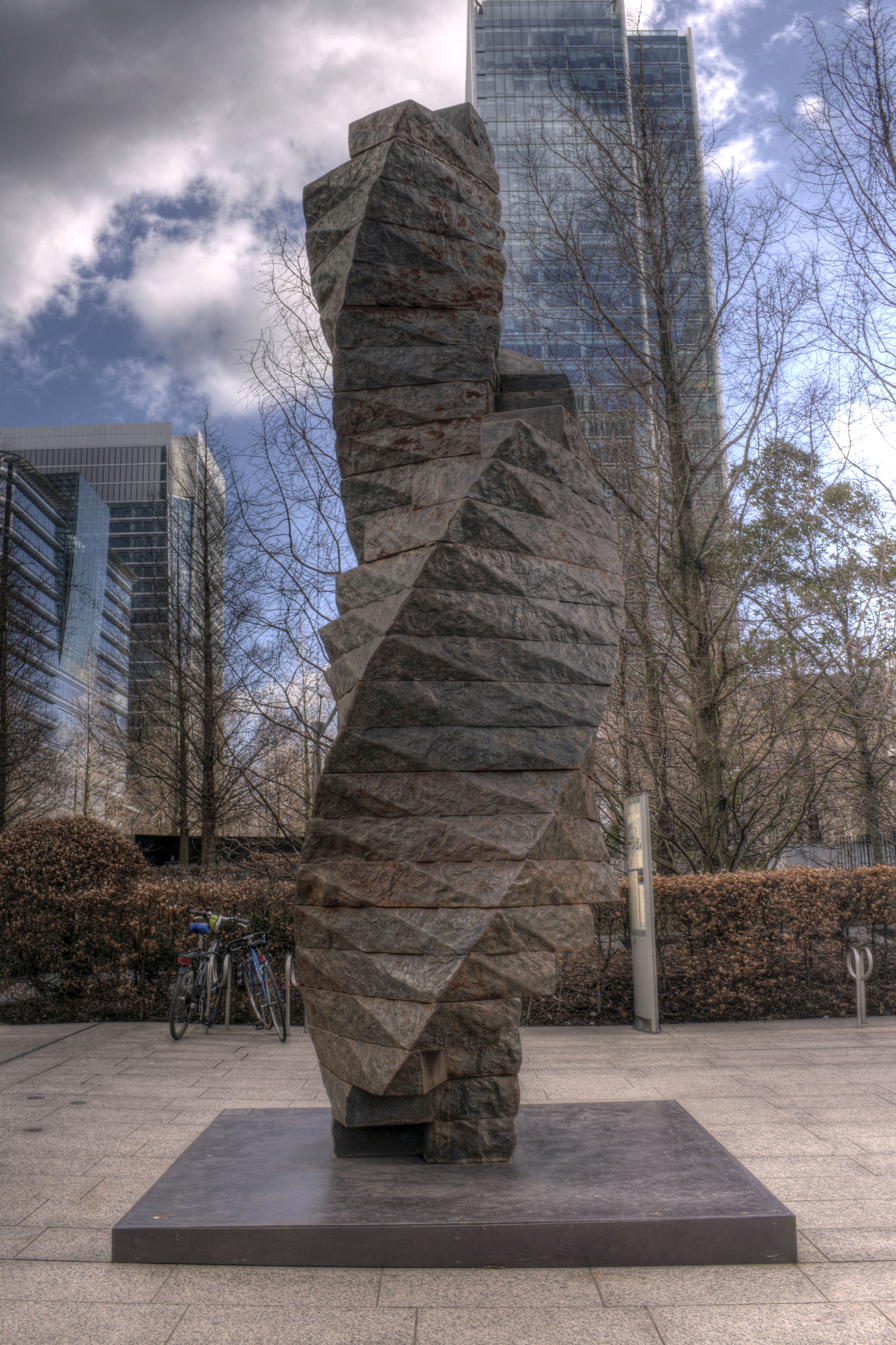
Torsion II “has been described as being like a stairway to the stars”

Charles William George Hadcock is a British sculptor[1] (born 1965 in Derby, England) known for his monumental sculptures that incorporate elements of geology, engineering, and mathematics. Hadcock's work also draws inspiration from music, philosophy, and poetry. He is a Deputy Lieutenant of Lancashire.

Charles Hadcock's sculptures can be found in a variety of public and private collections around the world. His works are often large in scale and are made from a variety of materials, including steel, stone, and bronze. Two sculptures, "Helisphere"[2] and "Torsion II",[3] are exhibited in Canary Wharf Art Trail, London.

== Education ==
Charles Hadcock studied at Ampleforth College 1979–1983, Derby College of Art & Technology 1983–1984, Cheltenham College of Art 1984–1987, Royal College of Art 1987–1989.

== Career ==
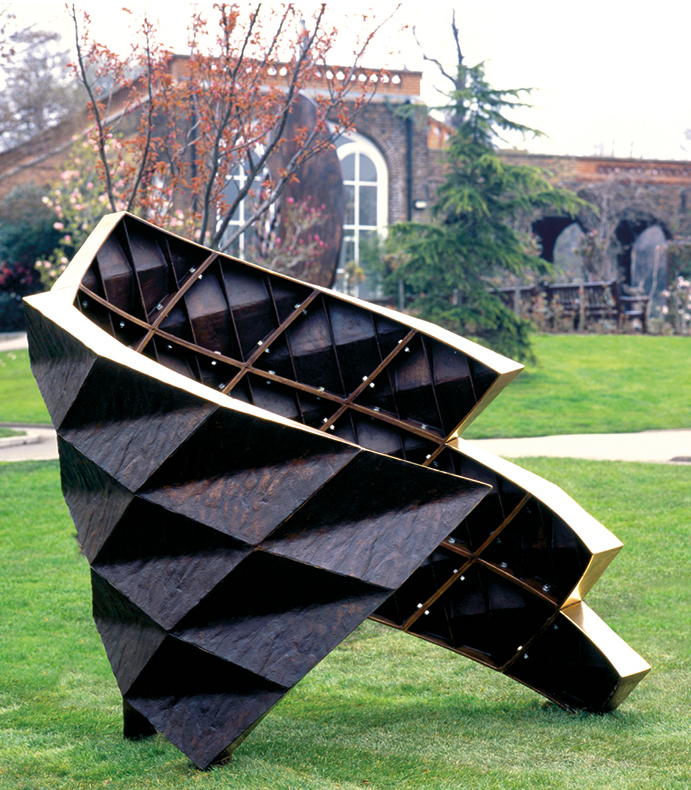
Caesura VI in Holland Park, London

Charles Hadcock's work incorporates aspects of the natural world, geology and engineering, either overtly or covertly. Finding that the mathematical formulas for shapes observed within the natural world are often the source for solving engineering design problems, Hadcock has incorporated these ideas both at first and at second hand into components for his sculptures. His direct observation of rocks becomes a source for the surface of his sculptures while mathematics inform how a sculpture may be achieved with multiple castings of a single form. Hadcock's works are imbued with a visual vitality so that the sculptures remain free, dynamic, unrestrained, and immediate.

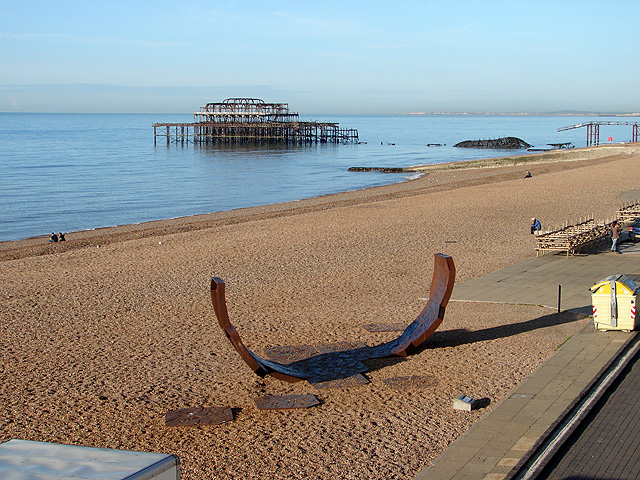
Passacaglia on the Brighton beach

Investigating Multiples, a 1996 solo exhibition in London at Reed's Wharf Gallery followed the siting of Caesura IV at Sculpture at Goodwood. His first monumental public commission in 1997, Passacaglia, came after a national competition for a permanent work to be installed on Brighton Beach. Controversial initially, Passacaglia is now an iconic feature of the Brighton beachfront.

A 1999 exhibition of Hadcock's drawings and maquettes If in doubt, ask at London's Imperial College was part of a drive by the university to encourage engineering students to learn about the arts. There is 1 in all of us was a collaboration with soundscape engineers at the Gardner Arts Centre, University of Sussex, whilst the Peter Scott Gallery at Lancaster University had to find additional exhibition space outside the gallery in 2006.

Hadcock was included in the 1999 exhibition of British sculptors Shape of the Century at Salisbury Cathedral and Canary Wharf, which was followed by inclusion in Bronze: Contemporary British Sculpture, a group show to celebrate the millennium and the tradition of siting bronze sculptures in London parks. Hadcock's monumental bronze, Caesura VI, was installed and remains in situ in Holland Park, London.

Hadcock has on occasion produced commissions, such as a monument to commemorate film director, James Whale, erected in 2001 on the grounds of a multiplex cinema in Whale's hometown of Dudley, and the installation of a sculptural gate and railings around a development in Central London.

Hadcock's exhibition program continued with a solo show at Canary Wharf in 2003, followed by a second larger solo show in 2011. He showed in Sotheby's Beyond Limits exhibition at Chatsworth House in 2011 and 2016 and in independent solo exhibitions in London at 60 Threadneedle Street in 2015, in the award-winning Eric Parry Architects designed foyer, and in a pop-up gallery near Green Park with the solo exhibition, Fusion, in 2016.

== Business ==
Charles Hadcock is a director of Roach Bridge Tissues, a Lancashire-based manufacturing company specializing in bespoke printing and conversion of tissue wrapping paper.

Between 2008 and 2012, he managed the development and installation of a hydro-electric power generating station at Roach Bridge Mill, Lancashire, where he is also the development director for an ongoing project to create a new business village on the historic mill site.

Hadcock has served as Chairman of Creative Lancashire, a public and private sector initiative to encourage and support all the creative industries in Lancashire.

Past projects include the development and management of The Watermark Studios, a mix of office and studio space in Preston (2001–2009).

== Awards ==
Charles Hadcock received The Queen's Award for Enterprise Promotion on 21 April 2007.

Hadcock was commissioned a Deputy Lieutenant for Lancashire in 2014.
