= One More River =

1934 film by James Whale

- Directed by: James Whale
- Written by: William Hurlbut; R. C. Sherriff
- Based on: One More River; 1933 novel by John Galsworthy
- Produced by: Carl Laemmle, Jr.
- Starring: Diana Wynyard; Colin Clive; Mrs Patrick Campbell
- Cinematography: John J. Mescall
- Edited by: Ted J. Kent
- Music by: W. Franke Harling
- Production company: Universal Pictures
- Distributed by: Universal Pictures
- Release date: August 6, 1934
- Running time: 85 minutes
- Country: United States
- Language: English

One More River is a 1934 American drama mystery film directed by James Whale. It was produced and distributed by Universal Pictures and starred Colin Clive, Diana Wynyard, and stage actress Mrs Patrick Campbell in one of her very few films. The film marked Jane Wyatt's screen debut. It is based on the 1933 novel of the same title by John Galsworthy.

The novel was the conclusion of a trilogy the Nobel Prize-winner conceived as a supplement to his popular Forsyte Saga, which told of generations of an upper middle class English family through the period when the stability of the Victorian era gave way to the uncertainties and tensions of modernity. Universal snapped up the film rights to this best seller and gave the prestigious project to its star director, James Whale.

Filming from May to July 1934, One More River was one of the first films to be subjected to the exacting censorship of the Production Code Administration under Joseph Breen, which took effect in mid-1934.

A trailer to the film is preserved in the Library of Congress collection, National Audio-Visual Conservation Center.

== Plot ==
Clare, Lady Corven and Sir Gerald Corven are to all outward appearances a happily married upper class British couple. But privately, Lady Clare's husband is physically and emotionally abusive toward her, and one day she can take no more, and walks out of the relationship. Clare books passage on a ship, where she is befriended by a kind and handsome young man, Tony Croom.

Although their relationship remains strictly platonic, Tony displays strong feelings for Lady Corven, which are duly noted by a private detective hired by Sir Gerald to keep tabs on his wife. Sir Gerald threatens to paint Clare's relationship with Tony in an unflattering light in court, this being a time when divorce was considered scandalous, especially among England's "privileged" classes.

== Cast ==
- Diana Wynyard as Clare Corven
- Colin Clive as Sir Gerald Corven
- Frank Lawton as Tony Croom
- Mrs Patrick Campbell as Lady Mont
- Jane Wyatt as Dinny Charwell
- Reginald Denny as David Dornford
- C. Aubrey Smith as General Charwell
- Henry Stephenson as Sir Lawrence Mont
- Lionel Atwill as Brough
- Alan Mowbray as Forsythe
- Kathleen Howard as Lady Charwell
- Gilbert Emery as The Judge
- E. E. Clive as Chayne
- Robert Greig as Blore
- Tempe Pigott as Mrs. Purdy
- Scotty Mattraw as Juryman (uncredited)

== Reception ==
In a contemporary review, Film critic Terrence Rafferty of The New York Times wrote, "R. C. Sherriff and James Whale, who distinguished themselves as a team by their skillful handling of the film of H. G. Wells's book, "The Invisible Man", have fashioned a grand picture out of the late John Galsworthy's last novel."

In its visual style, the film confirms Whale's immense talent, still too little known apart from his visionary horror tetralogy (Frankenstein [1931]; The Old Dark House [1932]; The Invisible Man [1933]; Bride of Frankenstein [1935]) and the analogous (if long suppressed) musical film breakthrough of Show Boat (1936).

More recently, Chris Fujiwara wrote on TCM.com, "One More River was released in August 1934 to great critical enthusiasm, which was not matched by popular interest. The mediocre box-office performance of the film, together with its genteel tone and its detailed concentration on the texture of social interaction, helped doom the film to undeserved neglect. It has rarely been revived and has received little attention from critics or historians, except in the context of auteurist appreciation of Whale's career. One More River needs rediscovery." Interest in Mrs. Patrick Campbell, and her relationship with George Bernard Shaw, can also spark topicality on the film.

Film historian William K. Everson considered the film "by far Hollywood's most successful attempt at putting any aspect of England on the screen." He added: "Perhaps as an Englishman I am nostalgically over-enthusiastic because I have never seen such a convincing and 'right' Hollywood film about England [...] Perhaps I am also nostalgically enthusiastic because of its pleasing, gentle, civilized reflection of an England that is largely no more."

Colin Clive's "first appearance, in a series of four shots that showcase his stiff swagger and superior scowl, is as devastating an entrance as any ever accorded a screen villain," Fujiwara continued. "The courtroom sequence is an astounding piece of filmmaking, with Whale's elaborately mobile camera accentuating the vastness of the space and setting off the rich contrasts in acting styles among the participants."
