= Colin Clive =

English actor

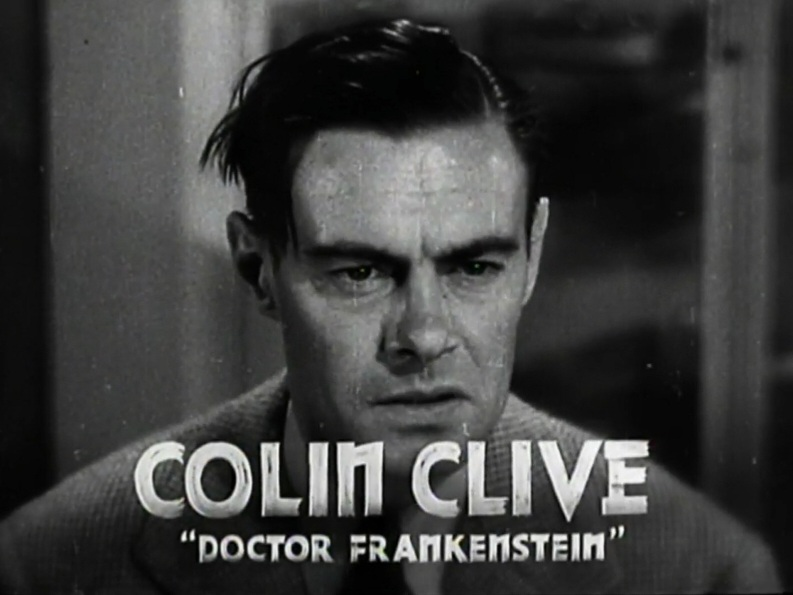
- Trailer for Mad Love (1935)
- Born: Colin Glenn Clive-Greig; 20 January 1900; Saint-Malo, Brittany, France
- Died: 25 June 1937 (aged 37); Los Angeles, California, U.S.
- Resting place: Ashes scattered at sea
- Education: Stonyhurst College; Royal Military Academy Sandhurst
- Occupation: Actor
- Years active: 1925–1937
- Spouses: Evelyn Taylor (m. 1922; died 1929) Jeanne de Casalis (m. 1929)

Colin Glenn Clive (born Clive-Greig; 20 January 1900 – 25 June 1937) was a British actor. Known for portraying individualistic, tumultuous characters which often mirrored his personal life, he is most famous for his role as Dr. Henry Frankenstein in the 1931 film Frankenstein and its 1935 sequel, Bride of Frankenstein. Clive’s maniacal delivery of the words, "It's alive, it's alive!" when Dr. Frankenstein confirms his creature is moving, was listed by American Film Institute (AFI) as one of the 100 greatest movie quotes of all time.

== Early life ==
Clive was born in Saint-Malo, France, to an English colonel, Colin Philip Greig, and his wife, Caroline Margaret Lugard Clive, a member of the aristocratic Clive family. In a 1935 interview, Clive stated his mother had moved to France to escape the tumult of the ongoing Second Boer War. His family had intended for Clive to embark on a military career, and he attended Stonyhurst College and subsequently the Royal Military College, Sandhurst, where he broke both knees after being thrown from and crushed by a horse. Recuperating from his injuries, Clive decided to become an actor. He was a member of the Hull Repertory Theatre Company for three years.

Clive created the role of Steve Baker, the white husband of racially mixed Julie LaVerne, in the first London production of Show Boat; the production featured Cedric Hardwicke and Paul Robeson. Clive first worked with James Whale in the Savoy Theatre production of Journey's End and subsequently joined the British community in Hollywood, repeating his stage role in the film version.

== Hollywood ==
Clive's first screen role, in Journey's End (1930), was also directed by James Whale. Clive played the tormented alcoholic Captain Stanhope, a character that (much like Clive's other roles) mirrored his personal life. He was an in-demand leading man for several major film actresses of the era, including Katharine Hepburn, Bette Davis, Corinne Griffith, and Jean Arthur. He starred as Edward Rochester in the 1934 adaptation of Jane Eyre opposite Virginia Bruce. He was a descendant of Robert Clive and appeared in a starring role in Clive of India (1935), a biopic of his ancestor. Clive remarked that he was disappointed he did not get to portray his own ancestor in the film.

Colin Clive, together with Leo G. Carroll, starred in a radio play titled The Other Place. It was written by John L. Balderston for the radio program The Fleischmann's Yeast Hour hosted by Rudy Vallee. It was aired on 14 November 1935.

In a 1935 interview with Film Weekly, Clive stated that he hated horror films and preferred more serious dramatic roles, only appearing in horror for financial reasons and because his performances were popular with audiences.

When his agent discovered that Clive was only accruing 30% of his actual income due to paying taxes in both the United States and the United Kingdom, Clive refused to obtain American citizenship, which would have removed British taxes, fearing that it would prevent him from serving in the British army if a war broke out.

Author Ayn Rand wrote Clive a fan letter in 1934 after seeing a stage performance of Journey’s End, praising Clive’s performance and character. Clive responded that he was very touched by the letter and would always keep it.

== Personal life ==
Clive was married to Jeanne de Casalis in June 1929. By 1935, Clive and Casalis had been living separately, with Clive in Los Angeles County and Casalis in London.

== Death ==
Colin Clive suffered from severe chronic alcoholism and he died from complications of tuberculosis on 25 June 1937 at age 37.

Clive's alcoholism was apparent to his co-stars. He was often seen napping on set and sometimes was so intoxicated that he had to be held upright for over-the-shoulder shots. Clive was tormented by the medical threat of amputation of his long-damaged leg.

Forrest J Ackerman recalled visiting Clive's body: "I actually saw him in death, lying in a bed at a mortuary where it was possible for the public to view his body. He looked remarkably as he had when lying in bed in The Bride of Frankenstein." Over 300 mourners turned out. One of the pallbearers was Peter Lorre. His remains were cremated and his ashes returned to England. His cenotaph is located at Chapel of the Pines Crematory.

== Roles ==
Flyer for Colin Clive's appearance in the 1935 play Libel!

=== Stage ===
- Peter and Paul (September 1925)
- Advertising April (November 1925)

Date of 1st performance	Title	Author(s)	City	Theatre	Role
1925 March 20	Rose-Marie	Otto Harbach, Rudolf Friml, Herbert Stothart	London	Drury Lane	Edward Hawley
1926 May 30	Getting Mother Married	Neil Grant	London	Apollo	Capt. Eric Wilbraham
1927 June 30	Fire	Arthur Rose	London	Everyman Theatre	St. John Sevening
1928 May 3	Show Boat	Oscar Hammerstein II, Jerome Kern	London	Drury Lane	Steve
1928 November 4	The Dark Path	Evan John	London	Savoy Theatre	James Havilland
1929 January 21	Journey's End	R. C. Sherriff	London	Savoy Theatre	Cpt. Stanhope
1929 April 14	Let's Leave It At That	Jeanne de Casalis, Colin Clive	London	Prince of Wales's Theatre	Michael Stern
1929 April 23	Shall We Join the Ladies?	J. M. Barrie	London	PalaceTheatre	Mr. Vaile
1930 February 2	Forty-Seven	Sydney Loch	London	Prince of Wales's Theatre	Forty-Seven
1930 April 22	Hamlet	William Shakespeare	London	Haymarket Theatre	Laertes
1930 June 30	The Swan	Ferenc Molnár	London	St. James's Theatre	Dr. Nicholas Agi
1930 December 5	Overture	William Bolitho	New York	Longacre Theatre	Karl Ritter
1931 May 21	The Crime at Blossoms	Mordaunt Shairp	London	Playhouse Theatre	Christopher Merryman
1932 July 19	Escape	John Galsworthy	London	Garrick Theatre	Matt Denant
1932 August 22	Loyalties	John Galsworthy	London	Garrick Theatre	Ronald Dancy
1932 September 29	Justice	John Galsworthy	London	Garrick Theatre	William Falder
1933 October 28	Eight Bells	Percy G. Mandley	New York	Hudson Theatre	Dale
1933 December 26	The Lake	Dorothy Massingham and Murray MacDonald	New York	Martin Beck Theatre	John Clayne
1935 December 20	Libel	Edward Wooll	New York	Henry Miller's Theatre	Sir Mark Loddon, Bart. M.P.

=== Film ===
- Journey's End (1930) as Capt. Dennis Stanhope (film debut)
- Frankenstein (1931) as Dr. Henry Frankenstein
- The Stronger Sex (1931) as Warren Barrington
- Lily Christine (1932) as Rupert Harvey
- Christopher Strong (1933) as Sir Christopher Strong
- Looking Forward (1933) as Geoffrey Fielding
- The Key (1934) as Capt. Andrew 'Andy' Kerr
- One More River (1934) as Sir Gerald Corven
- Jane Eyre (1934) as Edward Rochester
- Clive of India (1935) as Capt. Johnstone
- The Right to Live (1935) as Maurice
- Bride of Frankenstein (1935) as Dr. Henry Frankenstein
- The Girl from 10th Avenue (1935) as John Marland
- Mad Love (1935) as Stephen Orlac
- The Man Who Broke the Bank at Monte Carlo (1935) as Bertrand Berkeley
- The Widow from Monte Carlo (1936) as Lord Eric Reynolds
- History Is Made at Night (1937) as Bruce Vail
- The Woman I Love (1937) as Capt. Thelis (final role)
