= Wives Under Suspicion =

1938 film by James Whale

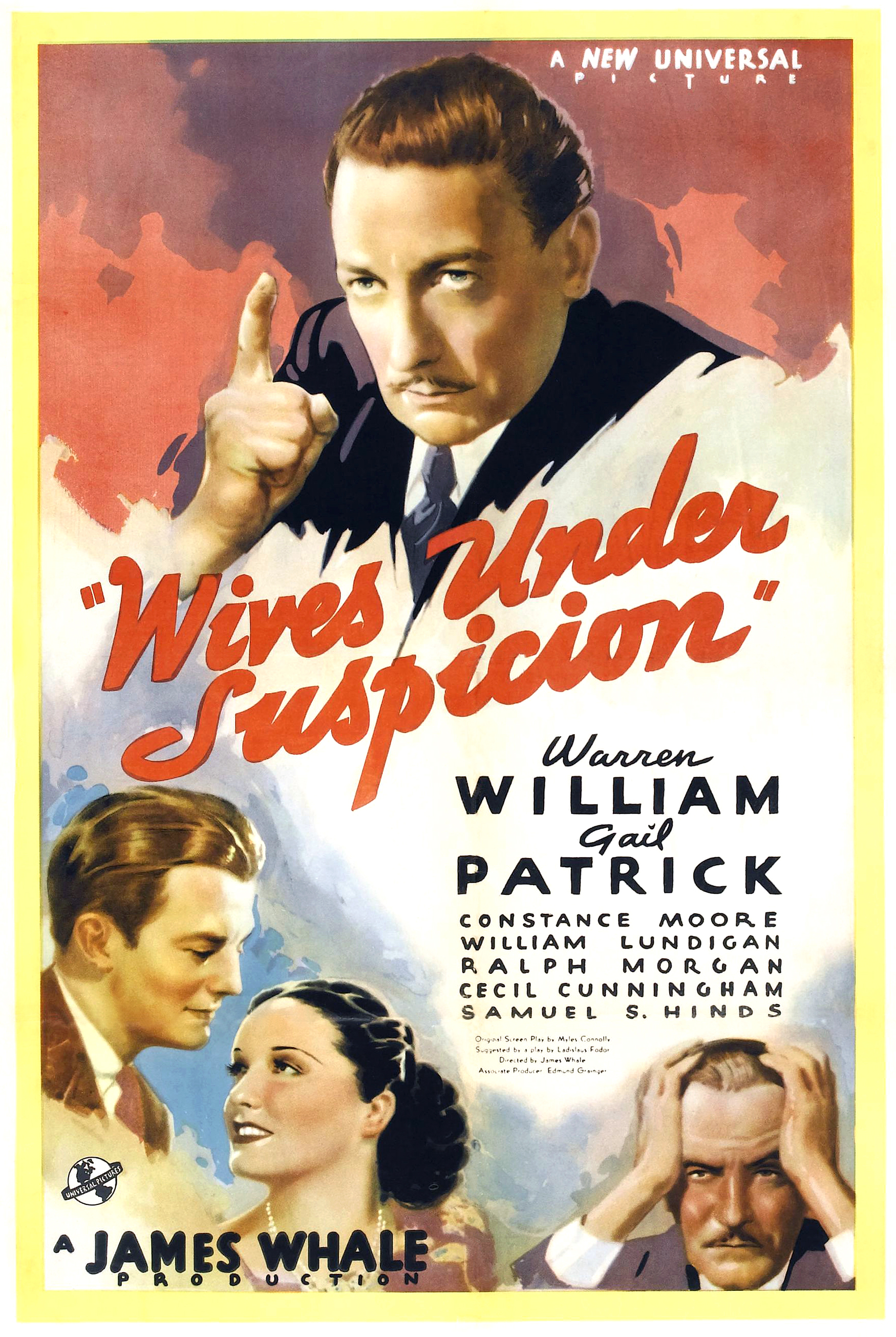
- Theatrical release poster by Karoly Grosz
- Directed by: James Whale
- Screenplay by: Myles Connolly
- Based on: The Kiss Before the Mirror by Ladislas Fodor
- Produced by: Edmund Grainger
- Starring: Warren William; Gail Patrick
- Cinematography: George Robinson
- Edited by: Charles Maynard
- Music by: Frank Skinner
- Production company: Universal Pictures
- Distributed by: Universal Pictures
- Release date: June 3, 1938
- Running time: 69 minutes
- Country: United States
- Language: English
- Budget: $205,000

Full film

Wives Under Suspicion is a 1938 Universal Pictures American crime film based on a 1932 Ladislas Fodor play that was previously adapted into the 1933 film The Kiss Before the Mirror. Wives Under Suspicion was directed by James Whale and stars Warren William, Gail Patrick, Ralph Morgan and Constance Moore.

== Plot ==
District attorney Jim Stowell realizes that his wife might be having an affair while he is prosecuting a cuckolded murderer.

== Cast ==
- Warren William as District Attorney Jim Stowell
- Gail Patrick as Lucy Stowell
- Ralph Morgan as Professor Shaw MacAllen
- William Lundigan as Phil
- Constance Moore as Elizabeth
- Cecil Cunningham as "Sharpy"
- Jonathan Hale as Dan Allison
- Lillian Yarbo as Creola
- Milburn Stone as Eddie Kirk
- J. Anthony Hughes as Murphy
- Samuel S. Hinds as David Marrow
- Edward LeSaint as Judge (uncredited)

== Production ==
Wives Under Suspicion is a remake of a film also directed by James Whale, The Kiss Before the Mirror (1933). Ralph Morgan, who plays Professor MacAllen, was the brother of Frank Morgan, who plays the prosecutor in The Kiss Before the Mirror.

In 1966, the film entered the public domain in the United States because the claimants did not renew its copyright registration in the 28th year after publication.

== Reception ==
In a contemporary review for The New York Times, critic Bosley Crowther wrote:

The one about the ruthless District Attorney hoist by his own oratorical petard is repeated in terms of Warren William and Gail Patrick and nothing else that differs from previous versions in "Wives Under Suspicion" ... The parallel between the crime passional Warren is prosecuting with so much unnecessary vigor and the one he is very nearly led to commit himself through a sudden inflamed suspicion of Gail is just a little bit too pat in all departments. It checks too well; for example, Warren neglects neglects his wife and so did Ralph Morgan, the wife-slayer who, everybody but Warren agrees, deserves clemency; he gets his first suspicion from a conjugal kiss before a lighted mirror, the same as Ralph did, and so on. And it wasn't even convincing when Ralph did it.
