= The Kiss Before the Mirror =

1933 film

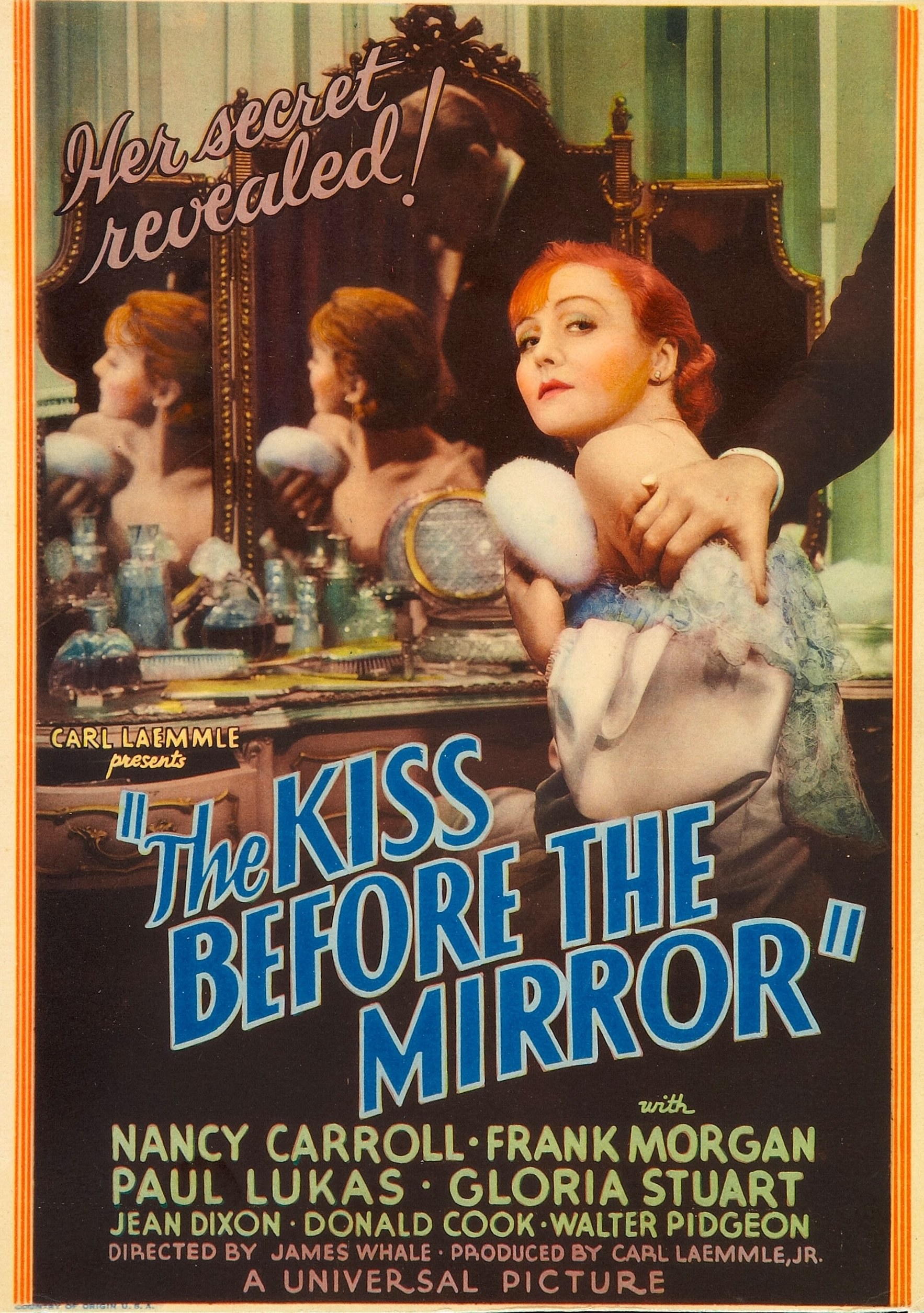
- Original theatrical poster
- Directed by: James Whale
- Screenplay by: William Anthony McGuire
- Based on: The Kiss Before the Mirror by Ladislas Fodor
- Produced by: Carl Laemmle, Jr.
- Starring: Nancy Carroll; Frank Morgan; Paul Lukas; Gloria Stuart
- Cinematography: Karl Freund
- Edited by: Ted J. Kent
- Music by: W. Franke Harling
- Production company: Universal Pictures
- Distributed by: Universal Pictures
- Release date: April 23, 1933 (Poughkeepsie, New York)
- Running time: 69 minutes
- Country: United States
- Language: English

The Kiss Before the Mirror is a 1933 American pre-Code mystery thriller film directed by James Whale and starring Nancy Carroll, Frank Morgan, Paul Lukas, and Gloria Stuart. An adaptation of the Ladislas Fodor stage play of the same name, the film focuses on the torrid mystery of a young woman's murder in Vienna.

Released by Universal Pictures in the spring of 1933, The Kiss Before the Mirror was made after Whale had completed The Old Dark House (1932), during a period in which he was waiting for the screenplay of his followup feature, The Invisible Man (1933), to be finalized.

Whale remade the film in 1938 as Wives Under Suspicion.

== Plot ==
Attorney Paul Held is defending his friend, Walter Bernsdorf, who has been charged with the murder of his wife Lucy in Vienna. By Walter's account, Lucy was unfaithful to him during their marriage. After a court hearing, Paul returns home to his wife, Maria, and watches her as she applies make-up at her vanity. The scene reminds him of the one Walter described leading up to Lucy's murder. When Paul attempts to kiss Maria, she rebuffs him, criticizing him for ruining her make-up. She then leaves their home.

Paul follows Maria through the streets of Vienna, and observes her meeting with a male lover. This enrages Paul, and he fantasizes about murdering Maria; he also becomes obsessed with vindicating Walter of killing Lucy, hoping to prove in court that Walter's extreme love for her drove him to a crime of passion. Despite the parallels between the circumstances of Lucy's murder and Maria's current liaison, she still continues to visit her lover.

Paul insists that Maria be present during the final day of deliberations in Walter's trial. He makes an impassioned closing statement, which he concludes by revealing a gun and pointing it at Maria in the audience. She screams in horror and loses consciousness, after which Paul finishes his speech. While the jury deliberates, Paul meets Maria in his office, where she reacts in terror. She insists she still loves him despite her affair.

Walter is ultimately acquitted, and warns Paul against killing Maria, which he says he will regret. Paul heeds his advice, and asks Maria to leave the courthouse. Upon returning home, Paul angrily smashes Maria's vanity mirror. Maria appears behind him, and the two embrace.

== Cast ==
- Nancy Carroll as Maria Held
- Frank Morgan as Dr. Paul Held
- Paul Lukas as Dr. Walter Bernsdorf
- Gloria Stuart as Lucy Bernsdorf
- Jean Dixon as Hilda
- Donald Cook as Maria's lover
- Charles Grapewin as Schultz
- Walter Pidgeon as Lucy's lover
- Wallis Clark as Public Prosecutor
- May Boley as Busybody in Courtroom
- Christian Rub as Man on the Wrong Floor
- Reginald Mason as Judge

== Production ==
=== Development ===
After completing The Old Dark House (1932) for Universal Pictures, director James Whale was asked by the studio to direct a screen adaptation of The Kiss Before the Mirror, a stage play by Ladislas Fodor. At the time, Whale was anxious to direct The Invisible Man (1933), but accepted the offer as R. C. Sherriff's screenplay for The Invisible Man was not yet complete.

=== Casting ===
Universal executive Carl Laemmle Jr. wanted Charles Laughton to portray attorney Dr. Paul Held, but Whale instead cast Frank Morgan in the role, with Nancy Carroll starring opposite Morgan as his wife. Gloria Stuart, a Universal contract player who had previously starred in Whale's The Old Dark House and who would go on to star in The Invisible Man, was cast in the role of Lucy Bensdorf, the murder victim at the center of the film. Paul Lukas, who also starred in Whale's By Candlelight (1933), was cast in role of Walter Bensdorf, Lucy's husband.

=== Filming ===
The film was shot by Whale's frequent collaborator, cinematographer Karl Freund. The film's elaborate interior sets, designed by art director Charles D. Hall, included a vaulted courtroom replicated from a real European court.

== Release ==
The Kiss Before the Mirror was released in Poughkeepsie, New York on April 23, 1933. It opened in Rochester, New York on April 27, 1933. The film had its San Francisco premiere on May 17, 1933.

=== Home media ===
Universal Pictures Home Entertainment released The Kiss Before the Mirror on DVD as part of their on-demand Universal Vault series in 2017. Kino Lorber released the film on Blu-ray on February 2, 2021, featuring a new 2K scan from the original film elements. Indicator Films issued a Blu-ray edition in the United Kingdom in 2023.

== Reception ==
Time gave the film a mixed review, noting: "The Kiss Before the Mirror has a smooth surface, good acting and a compactly organized, if tricky, story. It lacks action and emphasis." Mordaunt Hall of The New York Times praised the film, writing that it "has the distinction of an unusually interesting theme and a most efficient portrayal by Frank Morgan. The director, James Whale, has handled the story most expertly, with full appreciation for its drama."

== Remake ==
The film was remade by Whale five years later as Wives Under Suspicion, starring Warren William and Gail Patrick.

== Sources ==
- Gatiss, Mark (1995). James Whale: A Biography, or, The Would-Be Gentleman. London, England: Cassell. ISBN 978-0-304-32863-5.
- Mank, Gregory William (2015). Women in Horror Films, 1930s. Jefferson, North Carolina: McFarland & Company. ISBN 978-1-476-60954-6.
