= James Whale =

English film director (1889–1957)

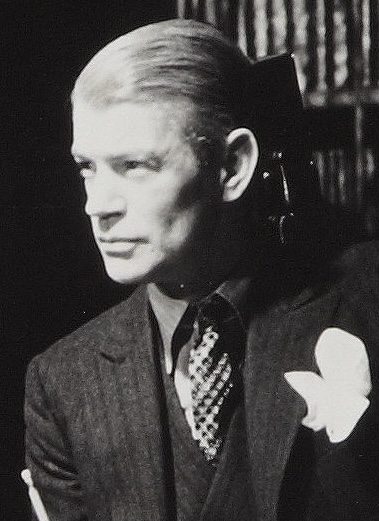
- Whale on the set of Bride of Frankenstein, 1935
- Born: 22 July 1889; Dudley, Worcestershire, England
- Died: 29 May 1957 (aged 67); Pacific Palisades, Los Angeles, California U.S.
- Resting place: Forest Lawn Memorial Park (Glendale)
- Education: The Blue Coat School, Dudley
- Occupations: Film director; Theatre director; actor
- Years active: 1919–1952
- Partners: David Lewis; Pierre Foegel

James Whale (22 July 1889 – 29 May 1957) was an English film director, theatre director and actor, who spent the greater part of his career in Hollywood. He is best remembered for several horror films: Frankenstein (1931), The Old Dark House (1932), The Invisible Man (1933) and Bride of Frankenstein (1935), all considered classics. Whale also directed films in other genres, including the 1936 film version of the musical Show Boat.

Whale was born into a large family in Dudley, Worcestershire (now the Metropolitan Borough of Dudley). He discovered his artistic talent early on and studied art. With the outbreak of World War I, he enlisted in the British Army and became an officer. He was captured by the Germans and during his time as a prisoner of war he realised he was interested in drama. Following his release at the end of the war he became an actor, set designer and director. His success directing the 1928 play Journey's End led to his move to the US, first to direct the play on Broadway and then to Hollywood, California, to direct films. He lived in Hollywood for the rest of his life, most of that time with his longtime romantic partner, producer David Lewis. Apart from Journey's End (1930), which was released by Tiffany Films, and Hell's Angels (1930), released by United Artists, he directed a dozen films for Universal Pictures between 1931 and 1937, developing a style characterised by the influence of German Expressionism and a highly mobile camera.

At the height of his career as a director, Whale directed The Road Back (1937), a sequel to All Quiet on the Western Front. Studio interference, possibly spurred by political pressure from Nazi Germany, led to the film's being altered from Whale's vision, and it was a critical failure. A run of box-office disappointments followed and, while he would make one final short film in 1950, by 1941 his film directing career was effectively over. He continued to direct for the stage and also rediscovered his love for painting and travel. His investments made him wealthy and he lived a comfortable retirement until suffering strokes in 1956 that robbed him of his vigor and left him in pain. He took his own life on 29 May 1957 by drowning himself in his swimming pool.

Whale was openly gay throughout his career, something that was very rare in the 1920s and 1930s. As knowledge of his sexual orientation has become more widespread, some of his films, Bride of Frankenstein in particular, have been interpreted as having a gay subtext and it has been claimed that his refusal to remain in the closet led to the end of his career. Other commentators have contended that his retirement was provoked by a succession of poorly received projects with which Whale was growing personally dissatisfied (particularly deleterious to his career was The Road Back, which went through development hell at multiple stages, whereafter the buck was perceived to stop with Whale as principal director).

== Early years ==
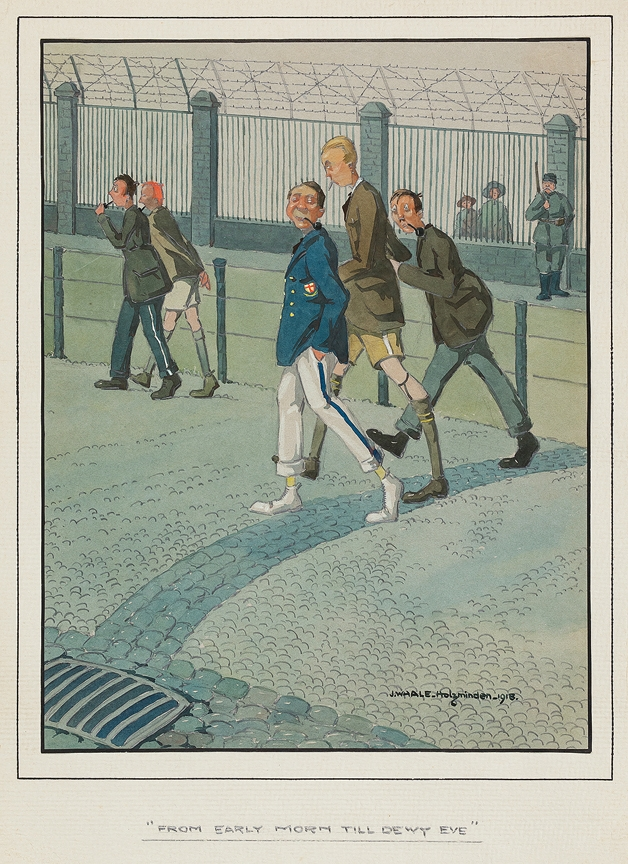
"From early morn to dewy eve": watercolour cartoon by Whale of prisoners in Holzminden prisoner-of-war camp in Germany, 1918

Whale was born in Dudley, Worcestershire, at the heart of the Black Country, the sixth of seven children of William, a blast furnaceman, and Sarah, a nurse. He attended Kates Hill Board School, followed by Bayliss Charity School and finally Dudley Blue Coat School. His attendance stopped in his teenage years, because the cost would have been prohibitive and his labor was needed to help support the family. Thought not physically strong enough to follow his brothers into the local heavy industries, Whale started work as a cobbler, reclaiming the nails he recovered from replaced soles and selling them for scrap for extra money. He discovered he had some artistic ability and earned additional money lettering signs and price tags for his neighbors. He used his additional income to pay for evening classes at the Dudley School of Arts and Crafts.

World War I broke out in early August 1914. Although Whale had little interest in the politics behind the war, he realized that conscription was inevitable, so he voluntarily enlisted just before it was introduced, into the British Army's Inns of Court Officer Training Corps in October 1915, and was stationed initially at Bristol. He was subsequently commissioned as a second lieutenant into the Worcestershire Regiment in July 1916. He was taken prisoner of war in battle on the Western Front in Flanders in August 1917, and was held at Holzminden Officers' Camp, where he remained until the war's end, being repatriated to England in December 1918. While imprisoned he became actively involved, as an actor, writer, producer and set-designer, in the amateur theatrical productions that took place in the camp, finding them "a source of great pleasure and amusement". He also developed a talent for poker, and after the war he cashed in the chits and IOUs from his fellow prisoners that he had amassed in gambling to provide himself with finances for re-entry into civilian life.

== Career ==
=== Theatre ===
After the armistice, he returned to Birmingham and tried to find work as a cartoonist. He sold two cartoons to the Bystander in 1919 but was unable to secure a permanent position. Later that year he embarked on a professional stage career. Under the tutelage of actor-manager Nigel Playfair, he worked as an actor, set designer and builder, "stage director" (akin to a stage manager) and director. In 1922, while with Playfair, he met Doris Zinkeisen. They were considered a couple for some two years, despite Whale's living as an openly gay man. They were reportedly engaged in 1924, but by 1925 the engagement was off.

In 1928 Whale was offered the opportunity to direct two private performances of R. C. Sherriff's then-unknown play Journey's End for the Incorporated Stage Society, a theatre society that mounted private Sunday performances of plays. Set over a four-day period in March 1918 in the trenches at Saint-Quentin, France, Journey's End gives a glimpse into the experiences of the officers of a British infantry company in World War I. The key conflict is between Capt. Stanhope, the company commander, and Lt. Raleigh, the brother of Stanhope's fiancée. Whale offered the part of Stanhope to the then barely known Laurence Olivier. Olivier initially declined the role, but after meeting the playwright agreed to take it on. Maurice Evans was cast as Raleigh. The play was well received and transferred to the Savoy Theatre in London's West End, opening on 21 January 1929. A young Colin Clive was now in the lead role, Olivier having accepted an offer to take the lead in a production of Beau Geste. The play was a tremendous success, with critics uniform and effusive in their praise and with audiences sometimes sitting in stunned silence following its conclusion only to burst into thunderous ovations. As Whale biographer James Curtis wrote, the play "managed to coalesce, at the right time and in the right manner, the impressions of a whole generation of men who were in the war and who had found it impossible, through words or deeds, to adequately express to their friends and families what the trenches had been like". After three weeks at the Savoy, Journey's End transferred to the Prince of Wales Theatre, where it ran for the next two years.

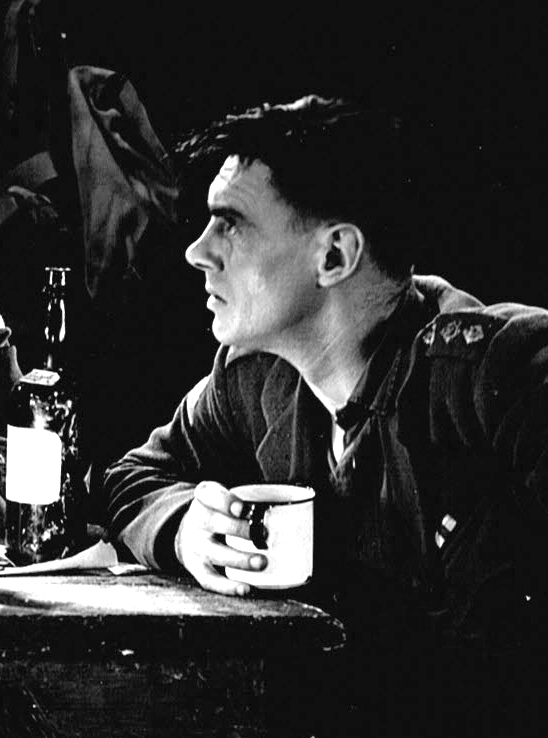
Colin Clive in Whale's 1929 stage production of Journey's End

With the success of Journey's End at home, Broadway producer Gilbert Miller acquired the rights to mount a New York production with an all-British cast headed by Colin Keith-Johnston as Stanhope and Derek Williams as Raleigh. Whale also directed this version, which premiered at Henry Miller's Theatre on 22 March 1929. The play ran for over a year and cemented its reputation as the greatest play about World War I.

=== Early work in Hollywood ===
The success of the various productions of Journey's End brought Whale to the attention of movie producers. Coming at a time when motion pictures were making the transition from silent to talking, producers were interested in hiring actors and directors with experience with dialogue. Whale traveled to Hollywood in 1929 and signed a contract with Paramount Pictures. He was assigned as "dialogue director" for a film called The Love Doctor (1929). He completed work on the film in 15 days and his contract was allowed to expire. It was at around this time that he met David Lewis.

Whale was hired by independent film producer and aviation pioneer Howard Hughes, who planned to turn the previously silent Hughes production Hell's Angels (1930) into a talkie. Whale directed the dialogue sequences. When his work for Hughes was completed, he headed to Chicago to direct another production of Journey's End.

Having purchased the film rights to Journey's End, British producers Michael Balcon and Thomas Welsh agreed that Whale's experience directing the London and Broadway productions of the play made him the best choice to direct the film. The two partnered with a small American studio, Tiffany-Stahl, to shoot it in New York. Colin Clive reprised his role as Stanhope, and David Manners was cast as Raleigh. Filming got underway on 6 December 1929 and wrapped on 22 January 1930. Journey's End was released in Great Britain on 14 April and in the United States on 15 April. On both sides of the Atlantic the film was a tremendous critical and commercial success.

=== With the Laemmles at Universal ===
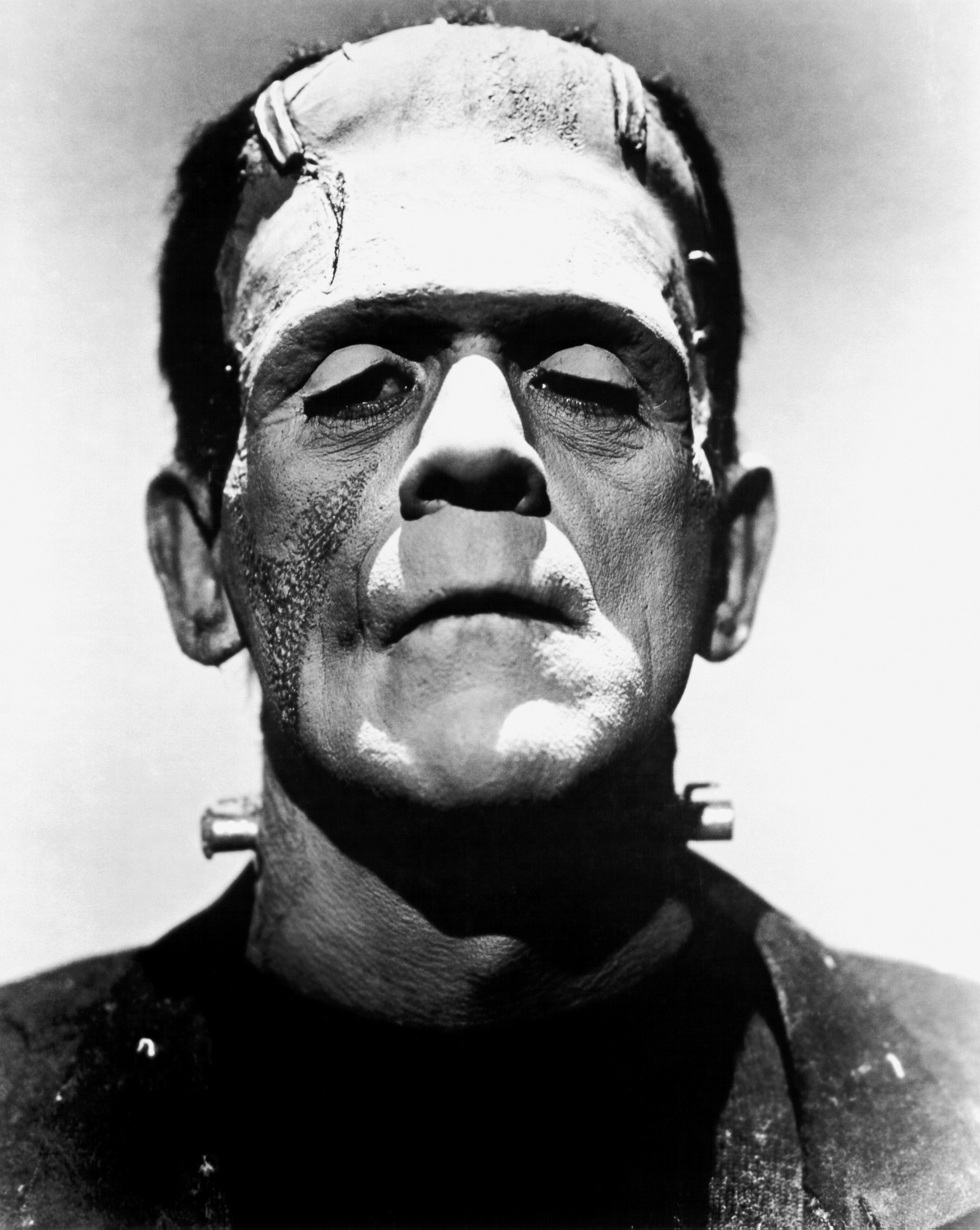
Whale directed Boris Karloff in the iconic horror film Bride of Frankenstein (1935).

Universal Studios signed Whale to a five-year contract in 1931 and his first project was Waterloo Bridge. Based on the Broadway play by Robert E. Sherwood, the film stars Mae Clarke as Myra, a chorus girl in World War I London who becomes a prostitute. It too was a critical and popular success. At around this time, Whale and Lewis began living together.

In 1931, Universal chief Carl Laemmle, Jr. offered Whale his choice of any property the studio owned. He chose Frankenstein, mostly because none of Universal's other properties particularly interested him, and he wanted to make something other than a war picture. While Mary Shelley's 1818 novel Frankenstein; or, The Modern Prometheus itself was in the public domain, Universal owned the filming rights to a stage adaptation by Peggy Webling. Whale cast Colin Clive as Henry Frankenstein and Mae Clarke as his fiancée Elizabeth. For the Monster, he turned to the little known Boris Karloff, who had wide-ranging experience in supporting roles. Shooting began on 24 August 1931 and wrapped on 3 October. Previews were held 29 October, with wide release on 21 November. Frankenstein was an instant hit with critics and the public. The film received glowing reviews and shattered box office records across the United States, earning Universal $12 million on first release.

Next from Whale were The Impatient Maiden and The Old Dark House (both 1932). The Impatient Maiden made little impression but The Old Dark House, starring Karloff and Charles Laughton, is credited with reinventing the "dark house" subgenre of horror films. Thought lost for some years, a print was found by filmmaker Curtis Harrington in the Universal vaults in 1968. It was restored by George Eastman House, and released on Blu-ray disk in 2017.

Whale's next film was The Kiss Before the Mirror (1933), a critical success but a box-office failure. He returned to horror with The Invisible Man (1933). Shot from a script approved by H. G. Wells, the film blended horror with humor and confounding visual effects. Much admired, The New York Times placed it in their list of the ten best films of the year, and the film broke box-office records in cities across America. So highly regarded was the film that France, which restricted the number of theatres in which undubbed American films could play, granted it a special waiver because of its "extraordinary artistic merit".

Also in 1933 Whale directed the romantic comedy By Candlelight which gained good reviews and was a modest box office hit. In 1934 he directed One More River, an adaptation of the novel of the same name by John Galsworthy. The film tells the story of a woman desperate to escape her abusive marriage to a member of the British aristocracy. This was the first of Whale's films for which Production Code Administration approval was required and Universal had a difficult time securing that approval because of the elements of sexual sadism implicit in the husband's abusive behavior.

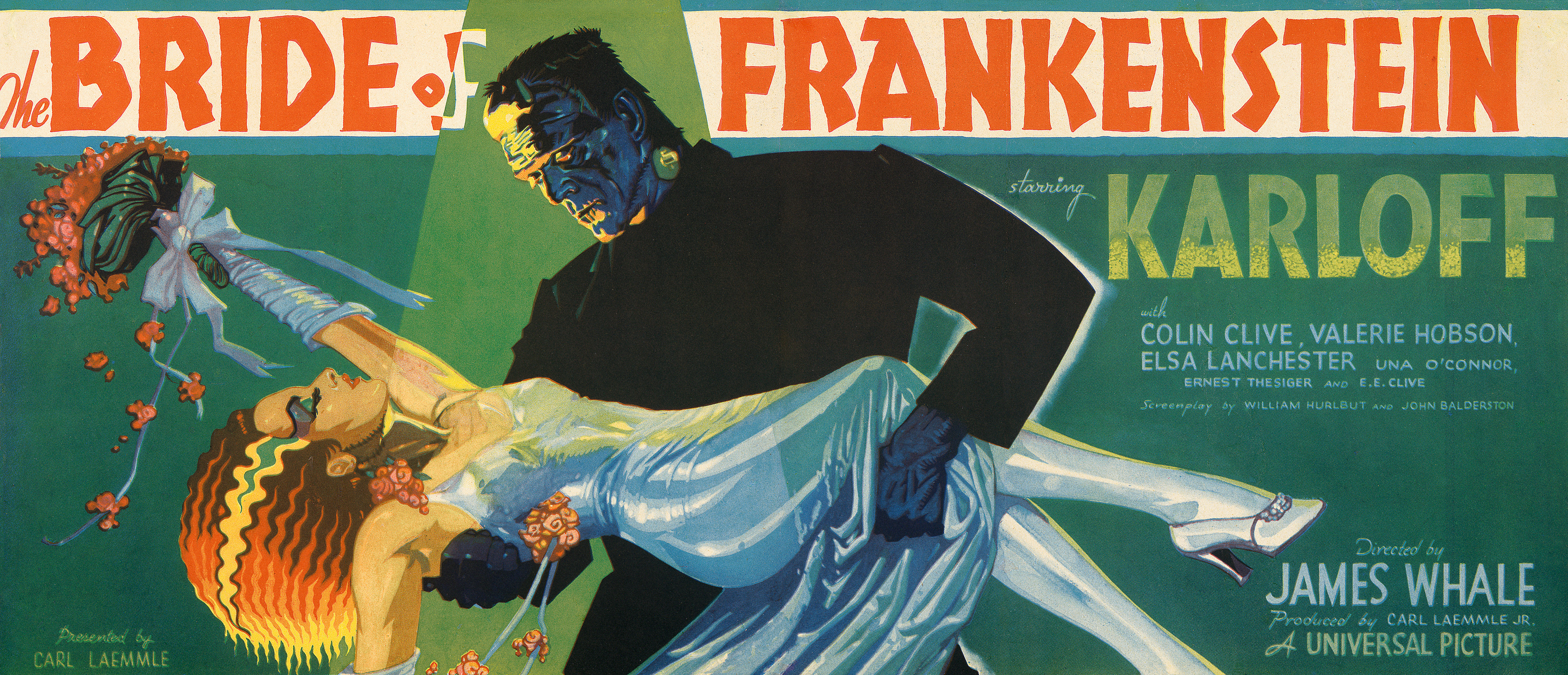
1930s Universal's art director Karoly Grosz designed this offbeat 1935 advertisement.

Bride of Frankenstein (1935) was Whale's next project. He had resisted making a sequel to Frankenstein as he feared being pigeonholed as a horror director. Bride hearkened back to an episode from Mary Shelley's original novel in which the Monster promises to leave Frankenstein and humanity alone if Frankenstein makes him a mate. In the film he does, but the mate is repelled by the monster who then, setting Frankenstein and his wife free to live, chooses to destroy himself and his "bride". The film was a critical and box office success, having earned some $2 million for Universal by 1943. Lauded as "the greatest of Universal's gothic horror", Bride is frequently hailed as Whale's masterpiece. With the success of Bride, Laemmle was eager to put Whale to work on Dracula's Daughter (1936), the sequel to Universal's first big horror hit of the sound era. Whale, wary of doing two horror films in a row and concerned that directing Dracula's Daughter could interfere with his plans for the first all-sound version of Show Boat (previously filmed as a part-talkie by Harry A. Pollard), instead convinced Laemmle to buy the rights to a novel called The Hangover Murders. The novel is a comedy-mystery in the style of The Thin Man, about a group of friends who were so drunk the night one of them was murdered that none can remember anything. Retitled Remember Last Night?, the film was one of Whale's personal favorites, but met with sharply divided reviews and commercial uninterest.

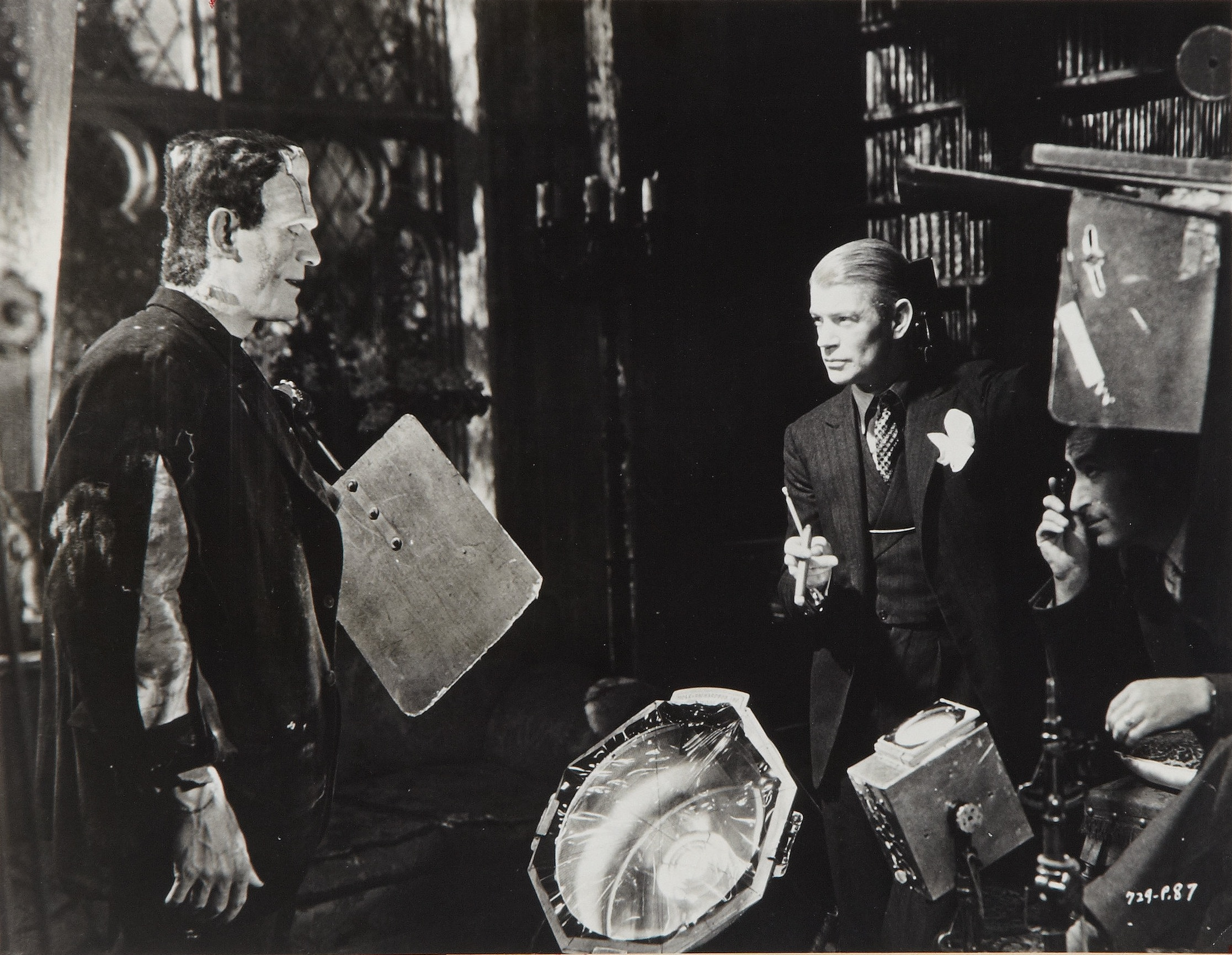
Boris Karloff and Whale on set of Bride of Frankenstein (1935)

With the completion of Remember Last Night? Whale immediately went to work on Show Boat (1936). Whale gathered as many of those as he could who had been involved in one production or another of the musical, including Helen Morgan, Paul Robeson, Charles Winninger, Sammy White, conductor Victor Baravalle, orchestrator Robert Russell Bennett, and, as Magnolia, Irene Dunne, who believed that Whale was the wrong director for the piece. The 1936 version of Show Boat, faithfully adapted from the original stage production, is believed to be the definitive film version of the musical by many critics, but became unavailable following the 1951 remake. In 2014, a restoration of the film became available on DVD in the U.S. as part of Warner Home Video's Archive Collection line; and in 2020, a 4K restoration Blu-Ray was released by The Criterion Collection.

Show Boat was the last of Whale's films to be produced under the Laemmle family. The studio was now bankrupt, and the Laemmles lost control to J. Cheever Cowdin, head of the Standard Capital Corporation, and Charles R. Rogers, who was installed in Junior Laemmle's old job.

=== Career decline ===
Whale's career went into sharp decline following the release of his next film, The Road Back (1937). The sequel to Erich Maria Remarque's All Quiet on the Western Front, which Universal had filmed in 1930, the novel and film follow the lives of several young German men who have returned from the trenches of World War I and their struggles to re-integrate into society. The Los Angeles consul for Nazi Germany, Georg Gyssling, learned that the film was in production. He protested to PCA enforcer Joseph Breen, arguing that the film gave an "untrue and distorted picture of the German people". Gyssling eventually met Whale, but nothing came of it. Gyssling then sent letters to members of the cast, threatening that their participation in the film might lead to difficulties in obtaining German filming permits for them and for anyone associated in a film with them. While the low volume of business conducted by Universal in Germany made such threats largely hollow, the State Department, under pressure from the Hollywood Anti-Nazi League and the Screen Actors Guild, stepped in and the German government backed down. Whale's original cut of the film was given generally positive reviews, but some time between preview screenings and the film's general release, Rogers capitulated to the Germans, ordering that cuts be made and additional scenes be shot and inserted. Whale was furious, and the altered film was banned in Germany anyway. The Germans were successful in persuading China, Greece, Italy and Switzerland to ban the film as well.

Following the debacle of The Road Back, Charles Rogers tried to get out of his contract with Whale; Whale refused. Rogers then assigned him to a string of B movies to run out his contractual obligation. Whale only made one additional successful feature film, The Man in the Iron Mask (1939), before retiring from the film industry in 1942.

== Post-film life ==
With his film career behind him, Whale found himself at a loose end. He was offered the occasional job, including the opportunity to direct Since You Went Away for David O. Selznick, but turned them down. Lewis, meanwhile, was busier than ever with his production duties and often worked late hours, leaving Whale lonely and bored. Lewis bought him a supply of paint and canvasses and Whale re-discovered his love of painting. Eventually he built a large studio for himself.

With the outbreak of World War II, Whale volunteered his services to make a training film for the United States Army. He shot the film, called Personnel Placement in the Army, in February 1942. Later that year, in association with actress Claire DuBrey, he created the Brentwood Service Players. The Players took over a 100–seat theatre. Sixty seats were provided free of charge to service personnel; the remaining were sold to the public, with the box office proceeds donated to wartime charities. The group expanded to the Playtime Theatre during the summer, where a series of shows ran through October.

Whale returned to Broadway in 1944 to direct the psychological thriller Hand in Glove. It was his first return to Broadway since his failed One, Two, Three! in 1930. Hand in Glove would fare no better than his earlier play, running the same number of performances, 40.

Whale directed his final film in 1950, a short subject based on the William Saroyan one-act play Hello Out There. The film, financed by supermarket heir Huntington Hartford, was the story of a man in a Texas jail falsely accused of rape and the woman who cleans the jail. Hartford intended for the short to be part of an anthology film along the lines of Quartet. However, attempts to find appropriate short fiction companion pieces to adapt were unsuccessful and Hello Out There was never commercially released.

Whale's last professional engagement was directing Pagan in the Parlour, a farce about two New England spinster sisters who are visited by a Polynesian whom their father, when shipwrecked years earlier, had married. The production was mounted in Pasadena for two weeks in 1951. Plans were made to take it to New York, but Whale suggested taking the play to London first. Before opening the play in England, Whale decided to tour the art museums of Europe. In France he renewed his acquaintanceship with Curtis Harrington, whom he had met in 1947. While visiting Harrington in Paris, he went to some gay bars. At one he met a 25-year-old bartender named Pierre Foegel, whom Harrington believed was nothing but "a hustler out for what he could get". The 62-year-old Whale was smitten with the younger man and hired him as his chauffeur.

A provincial tour of Pagan in the Parlour began in September 1952 and it appeared that the play would be a hit. However, Hermione Baddeley, starring in the play as the cannibal "Noo-ga", was drinking heavily and began engaging in bizarre antics and disrupting performances. Because she had a run of the play contract she could not be replaced and so producers were forced to close the show.

Whale returned to California in November 1952 and advised David Lewis that he planned to bring Foegel over early the following year. Appalled, Lewis moved out of their home. While this ended their 23-year romantic relationship, the two men remained friends. Lewis bought a small house and dug a swimming pool, prompting Whale to have his own pool dug, although he did not himself swim in it. He began throwing all-male swim parties and would watch the young men cavort in and around the pool. Foegel moved in with Whale in early 1953 and remained there for several months before returning to France. He returned to California in 1954 permanently, and Whale installed him as manager of a gas station that he owned.

Whale and Foegel settled into a quiet routine until the spring of 1956, when Whale suffered a small stroke. A few months later he suffered a larger stroke and was hospitalized. While in the hospital he was treated for depression with shock treatments.

Upon his release, Whale hired one of the male nurses from the hospital to be his personal live-in nurse. A jealous Foegel maneuvered the nurse out of the house and hired a female nurse as a non-live-in replacement. Whale suffered from mood swings and grew increasingly and frustratingly more dependent on others as his mental faculties were diminishing.

== Death ==
Whale died by suicide by drowning himself in his Pacific Palisades swimming pool on 29 May 1957 at the age of 67. He left a suicide note, which Lewis withheld until shortly before his own death decades later. Because the note was suppressed, the death was initially ruled accidental. The note read in part:

To ALL I LOVE,

Do not grieve for me. My nerves are all shot and for the last year I have been in agony day and night—except when I sleep with sleeping pills—and any peace I have by day is when I am drugged by pills.

I have had a wonderful life but it is over and my nerves get worse and I am afraid they will have to take me away. So please forgive me, all those I love and may God forgive me too, but I cannot bear the agony and it [is] best for everyone this way. The future is just old age and illness and pain. Goodbye and thank you for all your love. I must have peace and this is the only way.

— Jimmy.

Whale's body was cremated per his request, and his ashes were interred in the Columbarium of Memory at Forest Lawn Memorial Park, Glendale. Because of his habit of periodically revising his date of birth, his niche lists the incorrect date of 1893. When his longtime partner David Lewis died in 1987, his executor and Whale biographer James Curtis had his ashes interred in a niche across from Whale's.

== Sexual orientation ==
James Whale lived as an openly gay man throughout his career in the British theatre and in Hollywood, something that was virtually unheard of in that era. He and David Lewis lived together as a couple from around 1930 to 1952. While he did not go out of his way to publicize his homosexuality, he did not do anything to conceal it either. As filmmaker Curtis Harrington, a friend and confidant of Whale's, put it, "Not in the sense of screaming it from the rooftops or coming out. But yes, he was openly homosexual. Any sophisticated person who knew him knew he was gay." While there have been suggestions that Whale's career was terminated because of homophobia, and Whale was supposedly dubbed "The Queen of Hollywood", Harrington states that "nobody made a thing out of it as far as I could perceive".

With knowledge of his sexuality becoming more common beginning in the 1970s, some film historians and gay studies scholars have detected homosexual themes in Whale's work, particularly in Bride of Frankenstein in which a number of the creative people associated with the cast, including Ernest Thesiger and Colin Clive, were alleged to be gay or bisexual. Scholars have identified a gay sensibility suffused through the film, especially a camp sensibility, particularly embodied in the character of Pretorius (Thesiger) and his relationship with Henry Frankenstein (Clive).

Gay film historian Vito Russo, in considering Pretorius, stops short of identifying the character as gay, instead referring to him as "sissified" ("sissy" itself being a Hollywood gay stock character). Pretorius serves as a "gay Mephistopheles", a figure of seduction and temptation, going so far as to pull Frankenstein away from his bride on their wedding night to engage in the unnatural act of non-procreative life. A novelisation of the film published in England made the implication clear, having Pretorius say to Frankenstein "'Be fruitful and multiply.' Let us obey the Biblical injunction: you of course, have the choice of natural means; but as for me, I am afraid that there is no course open to me but the scientific way." Russo goes so far as to suggest that Whale's homosexuality is expressed in both Frankenstein and Bride as "a vision both films had of the monster as an antisocial figure in the same way that gay people were 'things' that should not have happened".

Whale's partner David Lewis stated flatly that Whale's sexual orientation was "not germane" to his filmmaking. "Jimmy was first and foremost an artist, and his films represent the work of an artist—not a gay artist, but an artist." Whale's biographer Curtis rejects the notion that Whale would have identified with the Monster from a homosexual perspective, stating that if the highly class-conscious Whale felt himself to be an antisocial figure, it would have been based not in his sexuality but in his origin in the lower classes.

== Film style ==
Whale was heavily influenced by German Expressionism. He was a particular admirer of the films of Paul Leni, combining as they did elements of gothic horror and comedy. This influence was most evident in Bride of Frankenstein. Expressionist influence is also in evidence in Frankenstein, drawn in part from the work of Paul Wegener and his films The Golem (1915) and The Golem: How He Came into the World (1920) along with The Cabinet of Dr. Caligari (1920) from Robert Wiene, which Whale reportedly screened repeatedly while preparing to shoot Frankenstein. Frankenstein roughly alternates between distorted expressionistic shots and more conventional styles, with the character of Dr. Waldman serving as "a bridge between everyday and expressionist spaces". Expressionist influence is also evident in the acting, costuming and the design of the Monster. Whale and makeup artist Jack Pierce may also have been influenced by the Bauhaus school of design. The expressionist influence lasted throughout Whale's career, with Whale's final film, Hello Out There, praised by Sight & Sound as "a virtuoso pattern of light and shade, a piece of fully blown expressionist filmmaking plonked down unceremoniously in the midst of neo-realism's heyday".

Whale was known for his use of camera movement. He is credited with being the first director to use a 360-degree panning shot in a feature film, included in Frankenstein. Whale used a similar technique during the Ol' Man River sequence in Show Boat, in which the camera tracked around Paul Robeson as he sang the song. (The sequence also uses expressionist montages illustrating some of the lyrics.) Often singled out for praise in Frankenstein is the series of shots used to introduce the Monster: "Nothing can ever quite efface the thrill of watching the successive views Whale's mobile camera allows us of the lumbering figure". These shots, starting with a medium shot and culminating in two close-ups of the Monster's face, were repeated by Whale to introduce Griffin in The Invisible Man and the abusive husband in One More River. Modified to a single cut rather than two, Whale uses the same technique in The Road Back to signal the instability of a returning World War I veteran.

== Legacy ==
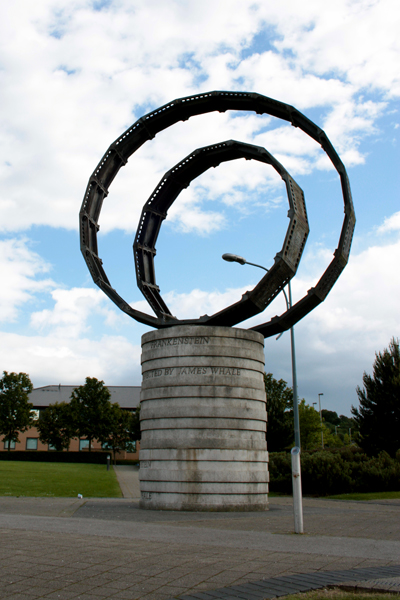
James Whale memorial sculpture (2001) by Charles Hadcock, in Dudley, England

Influential film critic Andrew Sarris, in his 1968 ranking of directors, lists Whale as "lightly likable". Noting that Whale's reputation has been subsumed by the "Karloff cult", Sarris cites Bride of Frankenstein as the "true gem" of the Frankenstein series and concludes that Whale's career "reflects the stylistic ambitions and dramatic disappointments of an expressionist in the studio-controlled Hollywood of the thirties".

American post-punk band Tuxedomoon recorded a song called "James Whale" on their debut studio album Half-Mute, released on March 15, 1980.

Whale's final months are the subject of the novel Father of Frankenstein (1995) by Christopher Bram. The novel focuses on the relationship between Whale and a fictional gardener named Clayton Boone. Father of Frankenstein served as the basis of the 1998 film Gods and Monsters with Ian McKellen as Whale and Brendan Fraser as Boone. McKellen was nominated for the Academy Award for Best Actor for his portrayal of Whale. Bram's novel has also been adapted as a play which premiered in London at the Southwark Playhouse in February 2015.

Only two of Whale's films received Oscar nominations: The Man in the Iron Mask (for its musical score), and Bride of Frankenstein (for its sound recording).

A memorial sculpture was erected for Whale in September 2001 on the grounds of a new multiplex cinema in his home town of Dudley. The sculpture, by Charles Hadcock, depicts a roll of film with the face of Frankenstein's monster engraved into the frames, and the names of his most famous films etched into a cast concrete base in the shape of film canisters. Other sculptures related to Whale's cinema career were planned, referencing his early work in a local sheet metal factory, but none had been installed as of 2019.

Horror in Hollywood: The James Whale Story, a retrospective of Whale's artwork, opened at the Dudley Museum and Art Gallery in October 2012 and ran through to January 2013.

== Filmography ==
Title	Year	Notes
Journey's End	1930	directorial debut
Hell's Angels	1930	(directed dialogue)
Waterloo Bridge	1931	
Frankenstein	1931	
The Impatient Maiden	1932	
The Old Dark House	1932	
The Kiss Before the Mirror	1933	
The Invisible Man	1933	
By Candlelight	1933	
One More River	1934	One of the first films subject to the Production Code Administration's censorship
Bride of Frankenstein	1935	
Remember Last Night?	1935	
Show Boat	1936	
The Road Back	1937	
The Great Garrick	1937	
Port of Seven Seas	1938	
Sinners in Paradise	1938	
Wives Under Suspicion	1938	
The Man in the Iron Mask	1939	
Green Hell	1940	
They Dare Not Love	1941	official final film
Face to Face	1952	uncredited final film

== Bibliography ==
- Anger, Kenneth (1984). Hollywood Babylon II. Dutton.
- Bansak, Edmund G. and Robert Wise (2003). Fearing the Dark: The Val Lewton Career. McFarland. ISBN 0-7864-1709-9.
- Benshoff, Harry M. (1997). Monsters in the Closet: Homosexuality and the Horror Film. Manchester University Press. ISBN 0-7190-4472-3.
- Bordman, Gerald Martin (1995). American Theatre: A Chronicle of Comedy and Drama, 1914–1930. Oxford University Press US. ISBN 0-19-509078-0.
- Bryant, Wayne (1997). Bisexual Characters in Film: From Anaïs to Zee. Haworth Press. ISBN 0-7890-0142-X.
- Buehrer, Beverly Bare (1993). Boris Karloff: A Bio-bibliography. Greenwood Publishing Group. ISBN 0-313-27715-X.
- Coleman, Terry (2005). Olivier. Macmillan. ISBN 0-8050-7536-4.
- Curtis, James (1998). James Whale: A New World of Gods and Monsters. Boston, Faber and Faber. ISBN 0-571-19285-8.
- Early, Emmett (2003). The War Veteran in Film. McFarland. ISBN 0-7864-1471-5.
- Ellis, Reed (1979). A Journey into Darkness: The Art of James Whale's Horror Films. University of Florida.
- Gatiss, Mark (1995). James Whale: a biography; or, The would-be gentleman. London: Cassell. ISBN 0-304-32863-4.
- Gifford, Denis (1973) Karloff: The Man, The Monster, The Movies. Film Fan Monthly.
- Glancy, Mark (1999). When Hollywood Loved Britain: The Hollywood "British" Film 1939–1945 Manchester University Press. ISBN 0-7190-4853-2.
- Green, S. J. D. and R. C. Whiting (2002). The Boundaries of the State in Modern Britain. Cambridge University Press. ISBN 0-521-52222-6.
- Hofler, Robert (2006). The Man Who Invented Rock Hudson: The Pretty Boys and Dirty Deals of Henry Willson. Carroll & Graf Publishers. ISBN 0-7867-1802-1.
- Kelly, Andrew (1997) Cinema and the Great War. Routledge. ISBN 0-415-05203-3.
- Kelly, Andrew (2001) 'All Quiet on the Western Front': The Story of a Film. I.B.Tauris. ISBN 1-86064-656-5.
- Kemp, Philip (2011) [2004]. "Whale, James (1889–1957)". Oxford Dictionary of National Biography (online ed.). Oxford University Press. doi:10.1093/ref:odnb/57320. (Subscription, Wikipedia Library access or UK public library membership required.)
- Low, Rachael, Roger Manvell and Jeffrey Richards (2005). History of British Film. Routledge. ISBN 0-415-15649-1.
- Noszlopy, George Thomas and Fiona Waterhouse (2005). Public Sculpture of Staffordshire and the Black Country. Liverpool, Liverpool University Press. ISBN 0-85323-989-4.
- Prawer, Siegbert Salomon (1989). Caligari's Children: The Film as Tale of Terror. Da Capo Press. ISBN 0-306-80347-X.
- Robertson, Patrick (2001). Film Facts. Watson-Guptill. ISBN 0-8230-7943-0.
- Russo, Vito (1987). The Celluloid Closet: Homosexuality in the Movies (revised edition). New York, HarperCollins. ISBN 0-06-096132-5.
- Sarris, Andrew (1996). The American Cinema: Directors and Directions 1929–1968. Da Capo Press. ISBN 0-306-80728-9.
- Skal, David J. (1993). The Monster Show: A Cultural History of Horror. Penguin Books. ISBN 0-14-024002-0.
- Skal, David J. and Jessica Rains (2008). Claude Rains: An Actor's Voice. University Press of Kentucky. ISBN 0-8131-2432-8.
- Whale, J. (July 1919). "Our Life at Holzminden". Wide World Magazine. 43: 314–19.
- Williamson, Audrey (1951). Theatre of two decades. Rockliff.
- Worland, Rick (2007). The Horror Film: An Introduction. Blackwell Publishing. ISBN 1-4051-3901-3.
- Young, Elizabeth. "Here Comes The Bride". Collected in Gelder, Ken (ed.) (2000). The Horror Reader. Routledge. ISBN 0-415-21356-8.
- Young, William H. and Nancy K. Young (2007). The Great Depression in America: A Cultural Encyclopedia. Greenwood Publishing Group. ISBN 0-313-33521-4.
