= Seren Stiwdios =

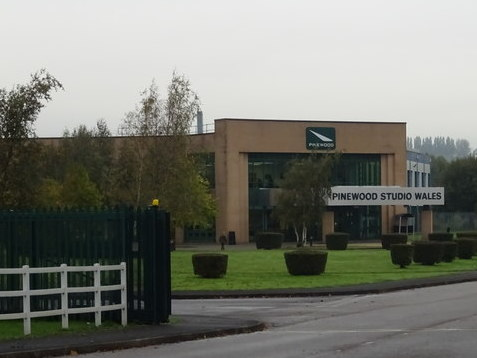
- Pinewood Studio Wales in 2019
- Interactive map of the Seren Stiwdios area
- Former names: Pinewood Studio Wales

General information
- Location: St Mellons, Cardiff, Wales, UK, Wentloog Avenue, Cardiff CF3 2GH
- Coordinates: 51°30′23.7″N 3°6′6.6″W
- Opening: 12 January 2015
- Owner: Welsh Government (2015–present)
- Management: Pinewood Group (2015–2020); Great Point (2020–present)

Seren Stiwdios (formerly Pinewood Studio Wales) is a Welsh film and television studio in Cardiff, Wales. Founded in 2015, the studio complex was operated by the Pinewood Group until March 2020 when the company terminated its agreement with the Welsh government to manage the facility. It is currently leased and managed by Great Point Media.

== Studio history ==
The studio was announced in February 2014, after negotiations between Pinewood Group and the Welsh government resulted in an agreement for Pinewood to rent the site of the former Wentloog Environmental Centre in the suburb of St Mellons in north-east Cardiff, which the government had purchased for £5.24 million and spent £9.5 million fitting out. Construction began in the second half of 2014, and the studio opened in January 2015.

In 2017, it emerged that Pinewood had not paid rent to the government for leasing the studio until January of that year. Economy minister Ken Skates told the Senedd that the two-year rent-free period was "consistent with market practice". Pinewood held a fifteen-year lease on the site, but the agreement had a five-year break clause, allowing the company to walk away in 2020. As of March 2019, Welsh production company Bad Wolf was the sole tenant of the studio facilities. In October 2019, Pinewood Group gave notice to the Welsh government that their agreement to run the studio would end on 31 March 2020 as permitted by the break clause. In October 2020, the studio was taken over by media investment firm Great Point, with the complex rebranded to Seren Stiwdios.

== Productions ==
The historical television series The Bastard Executioner was filmed on Stage 1 of the complex, and in other locations in Wales, and released in September 2015 on FX in the United States.

Studio filming for the fourth series of the BBC drama Sherlock took place at the studios in 2016.

A remake of the 1994 film The Crow was slated to be the first film to be shot at the studios in 2015, but production delays put the project on hold.

Filming for the BBC Three series Class (a spin-off of Doctor Who) took place here, excluding the corridor and hall scenes.
