= Ian Maclaren (actor) =

English actor (1875–1952)

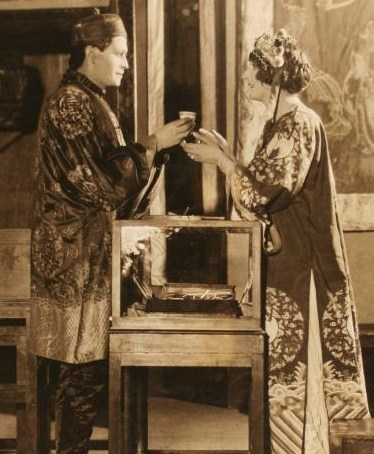
- Ian Maclaren & Florence Fair in The Green Beetle on Broadway (1924)
- Born: 1 May 1875; Lynmouth, Devon, England, UK
- Died: 10 April 1952 (aged 76); Los Angeles, California, U.S.
- Occupation: Actor
- Years active: 1923–1947 (film)

Ian Maclaren (1 May 1875 – 10 April 1952) was an English stage and film actor. He acted in more than thirty films in Hollywood including the 1930 war film Journey's End. Towards the end of his film career he was generally cast in small, uncredited parts.

== Partial filmography ==
- Under the Red Robe (1923) - King Louis XIII
- Yolanda (1924) - Campo Basse
- Monsieur Beaucaire (1924) - Duke of Winterset
- Journey's End (1930) - Lt. Osborne
- Men on Call (1930) - Eric (uncredited)
- Body and Soul (1931) - General Trafford-Jones
- The Conquering Horde (1931) - Marvin Fletcher
- Prestige (1931) - Colonel Du Flos
- Merry-Go-Round (1932) - Chief Frank Hyers
- Cleopatra (1934) - Cassius
- Les Misérables (1935) - Head Gardener
- False Faces (1935) - Reconstructionist (uncredited)
- The Last of the Mohicans (1936) - William Pitt
- The House of Secrets (1936) - Commissioner Cross
- The Prince and the Pauper (1937) - Second Doctor
- Parnell (1937) - House of Commons Member (uncredited)
- The Prisoner of Zenda (1937) - Cardinal (uncredited)
- Lancer Spy (1937) - Plainclothesman (uncredited)
- The Trial of Portia Merriman (1937) - Father Caslez
- Invisible Enemy (1938) - Sir Joshua Longstreet
- Kidnapped (1938) - Minister (uncredited)
- The Young in Heart (1938) - Doctor (uncredited)
- If I Were King (1938) - Beggar (uncredited)
- Little Orphan Annie (1938) - Soo Long
- The Hound of the Baskervilles (1939) - Sir Charles
- The Man in the Iron Mask (1939) - Valet de Chambre (uncredited)
- The Man They Could Not Hang (1939) - Priest (uncredited)
- The Doctor Takes a Wife (1940) - Professor (uncredited)
- When the Daltons Rode (1940) - Crony #2 (uncredited)
- A Little Bit of Heaven (1940) - Second Cronie (uncredited)
- The Common Touch (1941) - Harmonica Player
- The Grand Escapade (1947) - Harmonica Player (final film role)

== Bibliography ==
- Goble, Alan. The Complete Index to Literary Sources in Film. Walter de Gruyter, 1999.
