= Ralph Richardson on stage and screen =

List of actor's acting roles and awards

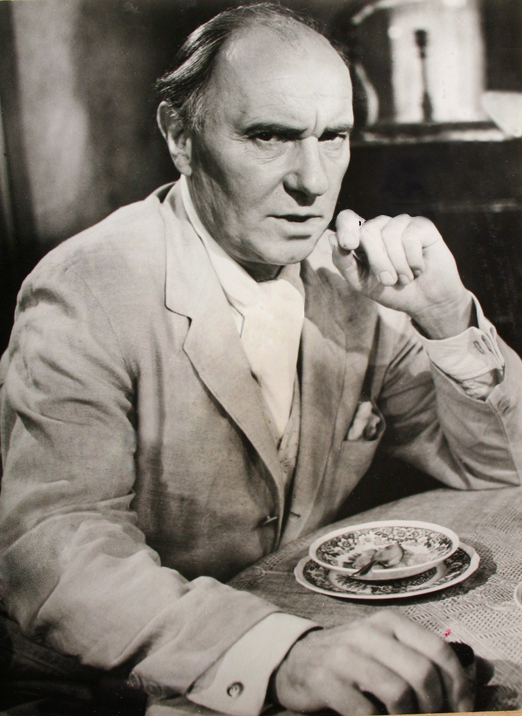
Richardson in the 1962 film, Long Day's Journey into Night

Sir Ralph Richardson (1902–1983) was an English actor who appeared on radio, film, television and stage. Described by The Guardian as "indisputably our most poetic actor", and by the director David Ayliff as "a natural actor ... [who] couldn't stop being a perfect actor", Richardson's career lasted over 50 years. He was—in the words of his biographer, Sheridan Morley—one "of the three great actor knights of the mid-twentieth century", alongside Laurence Olivier and John Gielgud.

After seeing a production of Hamlet starring Sir Frank Benson, Richardson decided to become an actor and made his stage debut, playing a gendarme in The Bishop's Candlesticks in December 1920. After touring and appearing in rep, he made his London debut in July 1926 as the stranger in Oedipus at Colonus. In 1930 he joined the Old Vic where he first met Gielgud, staying with the company until the following year. After service during the Second World War with the Royal Naval Volunteer Reserve, he returned to acting, preferring the works of the more modern authors Luigi Pirandello, Joe Orton, Harold Pinter, George Bernard Shaw and J. B. Priestley to the classic plays of Shakespeare. A radio career ran in parallel to that on the stage, and Richardson was first broadcast in The City in 1929.

Richardson's film career began in 1931 as an uncredited extra in Dreyfus; he did not take film seriously as a medium, but undertook the work for money. His career in film was described by the film historian Brian McFarlane, writing for the British Film Institute, as "prolific and random"; McFarlane considered that in Richardson's performances, "he would remind one that he had few peers and no superiors in his particular line". Richardson won many awards for his performances on stage and screen before his death, including a BAFTA award for The Sound Barrier; an Evening Standard Award for Home, which he shared with John Gielgud; and a special Laurence Olivier Award. His final film, Greystoke: The Legend of Tarzan, Lord of the Apes—for which he received further critical plaudits and award nominations—was released after his death.

== Stage roles ==
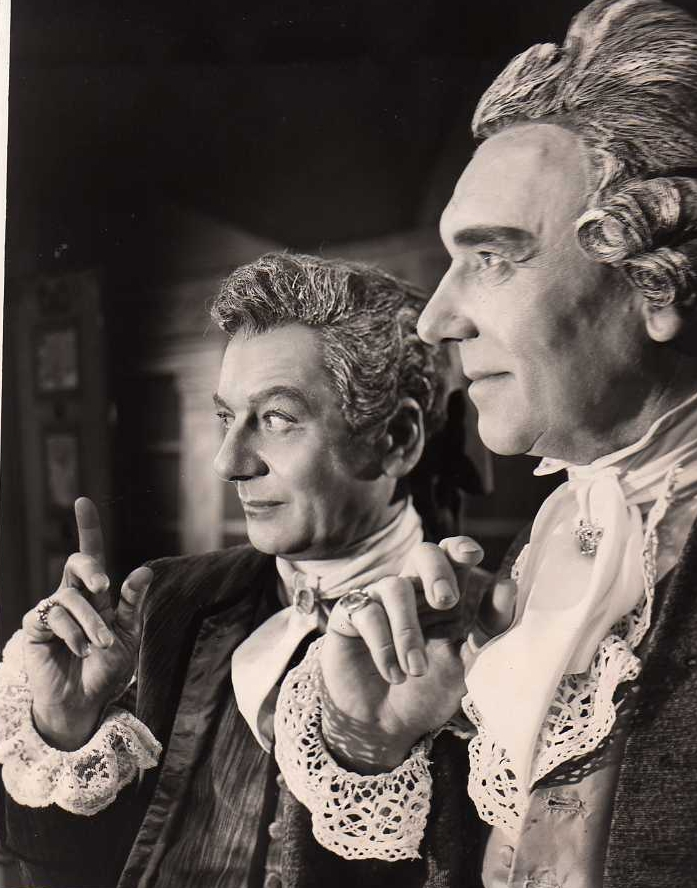
Richardson (right), appearing with John Gielgud in the 1963 Broadway production of The School for Scandal

Richardson's stage credits
Production	Date	Role	Theatre (London, unless otherwise noted)
The Bishop's Candlesticks	1920	Gendarme	St Nicholas Hall, Brighton
The Farmer's Romance	1921	Cuthbert	St Nicholas Hall, Brighton
Macbeth	1921	Macduff and Banquo	St Nicholas Hall, Brighton
The Moon Children	1921	Father	St Nicholas Hall, Brighton
The Taming of the Shrew	1921	Tranio	St Nicholas Hall, Brighton
Twelfth Night	1921	Malvolio	St Nicholas Hall, Brighton
Oliver Twist	1921	Mr Bumble and Bill Sikes	St Nicholas Hall, Brighton
The Merchant of Venice	1921	Lorenzo	Marina Theatre, Lowestoft and touring
Hamlet	1921	Bernardo and Guildenstern	touring
The Taming of the Shrew	1921	Pedant	touring
Julius Caesar	1921	Soothsayer and Strato	touring
As You Like It	1921	Oliver	touring
Henry V	1921	Scroop and Gower	touring
Macbeth	1921	Angus and Macduff	touring
The Tempest	1921	Francisco	touring
A Midsummer Night's Dream	1921	Lysander	touring
Twelfth Night	1921	Curio and Valentine	touring
Macbeth	1922	Banquo	touring
A Midsummer Night's Dream	1922	Lysander	touring
Hamlet	1922	Horatio	touring
Julius Caesar	1922	Decius Brutus and Octavius	touring
Twelfth Night	1922	Fabian	touring
The Taming of the Shrew	1922	Vincentio	touring
The Taming of the Shrew	1922	Lucentio	touring
Othello	1923	Cassio	touring
The Merchant of Venice	1923	Antonio and Gratiano	touring
Julius Caesar	1923	Antony	touring
The Rivals	1923	Sir Lucius O'Trigger	Abbey Theatre, Dublin
The Romantic Age	1923	Bobby	Abbey Theatre, Dublin
Outward Bound	1924	Henry	touring
The Way of the World	1924	Fainall	touring
The Farmer's Wife	1925	Richard Coaker	touring
The Christmas Party	1926	Dick Whittington	Birmingham Repertory Theatre
The Cassilis Engagement	1926	Geoffrey Cassilis	Birmingham Repertory Theatre
The Round Table	1926	Christopher Pegram	Birmingham Repertory Theatre
The Importance of Being Earnest	1926	Lane	Birmingham Repertory Theatre
He Who Gets Slapped	1926	Gentleman	Birmingham Repertory Theatre
Devonshire Cream	1926	Robert Blanchard	Birmingham Repertory Theatre
Hobson's Choice	1926	Albert Prossor	Birmingham Repertory Theatre
The Land of Promise	1926	Frank Taylor	Birmingham Repertory Theatre
The Barber and the Cow	1926	Dr Bevan	Birmingham Repertory Theatre
Dear Brutus	1926	Dearth	Birmingham Repertory Theatre
Oedipus at Colonus	1926	The Stranger	Scala
Yellow Sands	1926	Arthur Varwell	Haymarket
Back to Methuselah	1928	Zazim and Pygmalion	Court
Harold	1928	Gurth	Court
The Taming of the Shrew	1928	Tranio	Court
Prejudice	1928	Hezekiah Brent	Arts
Aren't Women Wonderful?	1928	Ben Hawley	Court
The Runaways	1928	James Jago	Garrick
The New Sin	1928	David	Little Theatre, Epsom
Monsieur Beaucaire	1928	Duke of Winterset	touring in South Africa
The School for Scandal	1929	Joseph Surface	touring in South Africa
David Garrick	1929	Squire Chivy	touring in South Africa
Silver Wings	1930	Gilbert Nash	Dominion and touring
Othello	1930	Roderigo	Savoy
Henry IV, Part 1	1930	Prince Hal	The Old Vic
The Jealous Wife	1930	Sir Harry Beagle	The Old Vic
The Tempest	1930	Caliban	The Old Vic
Richard II	1930	Bolingbroke	The Old Vic
Antony and Cleopatra	1930	Enobarbus	The Old Vic
Twelfth Night	1931	Sir Toby Belch	Sadler's Wells
Arms and the Man	1931	Bluntschli	The Old Vic and Sadler's Wells
Much Ado About Nothing	1931	Don Pedro	The Old Vic and Sadler's Wells
King Lear	1931	Kent	The Old Vic and Sadler's Wells
A Woman Killed with Kindness	1931	Nicholas	Festival Theatre, Malvern
She Would If She Could	1931	Courtall	Festival Theatre, Malvern
The Switchback	1931	Viscount Pascal	Festival Theatre, Malvern
King John	1931	Faulconbridge	The Old Vic
The Taming of the Shrew	1931	Petruchio	The Old Vic
A Midsummer Night's Dream	1931	Bottom	The Old Vic
Henry V	1931	Henry V	The Old Vic
The Knight of the Burning Pestle	1931	Ralph	The Old Vic
Julius Caesar	1931	Brutus	The Old Vic
Abraham Lincoln	1931	General Grant	The Old Vic
Othello	1931	Iago	The Old Vic
Hamlet	1931	The Ghost and First Gravedigger	The Old Vic
Ralph Roister Doister	1932	Matthew Merrygreek	Festival Theatre, Malvern
The Alchemist	1932	Face	Festival Theatre, Malvern
Oroonoko	1932	Oroonoko	Festival Theatre, Malvern
Too True to Be Good	1932	Sergeant Fielding	Festival Theatre, Malvern
Too True to Be Good	1932	Sergeant Fielding	New
For Services Rendered	1932	Collie Stratton	Globe
Head-on Crash	1933	Dirk Barclay	Queen's Theatre
Wild Decembers	1933	Arthur Bell Nicholls	Apollo
Sheppey	1933	Sheppey	Wyndham's
Peter Pan	1933	Mr Darling and Captain Hook	Palladium
Marriage is No Joke	1934	John MacGregor	Globe
Eden End	1934	Charles Appleby	Duchess
Cornelius	1935	Cornelius	Duchess
Romeo and Juliet	1935	Mercutio and Chorus	Martin Beck Theatre, New York, and on US tour
Promise	1936	Emile Delbar	Shaftesbury
Bees on the Boat Deck	1936	Sam Gridley	Lyric
The Amazing Dr Clitterhouse	1936	Dr Clitterhouse	Haymarket
The Silent Knight	1937	Peter Agardi	St James's
A Midsummer Night's Dream	1937	Bottom	The Old Vic
Othello	1938	Othello	The Old Vic
Johnson Over Jordan	1939	Robert Johnson	New
Peer Gynt	1944	Peer	New and touring in Germany and France
Arms and the Man	1944	Bluntschli	New and touring in Germany and France
Richard III	1944	Richmond	New and touring in Germany and France
Uncle Vanya	1944	Uncle Vanya	New
Henry IV, Part 1	1945	Sir John Falstaff	New and Century, New York
Henry IV, Part 2	1945	Sir John Falstaff	New and Century, New York
Oedipus Rex	1945	Tiresias	New and Century, New York
The Critic	1945	Lord Burleigh	New and Century, New York
An Inspector Calls	1946-47	Inspector Goole	New
Cyrano de Bergerac	1946-47	Cyrano	New
The Alchemist	1946-47	Face	New
Richard II	1946-47	John of Gaunt	New
Royal Circle	1948	Marcus	Wyndham's
The Heiress	1949	Dr Sloper	Haymarket
Home at Seven	1950	David Preston	Wyndham's
Three Sisters	1951	Vershinin	Aldwych
The Tempest	1952	Prospero	Shakespeare Memorial Theatre, Stratford-on-Avon
Macbeth	1952	Macbeth	Shakespeare Memorial Theatre, Stratford-on-Avon
Volpone	1952	Volpone	Shakespeare Memorial Theatre, Stratford-on-Avon
The White Carnation	1953	John Greenwood	Globe
A Day by the Sea	1953	Dr Farley	Haymarket
Separate Tables	1955	Mr Martin and Major Pollock	Australasian tour
The Sleeping Prince	1955	Grand Duke	Australasian tour
Timon of Athens	1956	Timon	The Old Vic
The Waltz of the Toreadors	1957	General St Pé	Coronet, New York
Flowering Cherry	1957	Cherry	Haymarket and UK tour
The Complaisant Lover	1959	Victor Rhodes	Globe
The Last Joke	1960	Edward Portal	Phoenix
The School for Scandal	1962–63	Sir Peter Teazle	Haymarket, Majestic, New York and US tour
Six Characters in Search of an Author	1963	Father	May Fair
The Merchant of Venice	1964	Shylock	Theatre Royal, Brighton, and tour to South America and Europe
A Midsummer Night's Dream	1964	Bottom	Theatre Royal, Brighton, and tour to South America and Europe
Carving a Statue	1964	Father	Haymarket
You Never Can Tell	1966	Waiter	Haymarket
The Rivals	1966	Sir Anthony Absolute	Haymarket
The Merchant of Venice	1967	Shylock	Haymarket
What the Butler Saw	1969	Dr Rance	Queen's Theatre
Home	1970	Jack	Royal Court, Apollo and Morosco, New York
West of Suez	1971	Wyatt Gilman	Royal Court and Cambridge
Lloyd George Knew My Father	1972	General Boothroyd	Savoy and tour of Australia and North America
John Gabriel Borkman	1975	Borkman	The Old Vic
No Man's Land	1975	Hirst	The Old Vic, and Longacre, New York
The Kingfisher	1977	Cecil	Lyric
The Cherry Orchard	1978	Firs	National
Alice's Boys	1978	Colonel White	Savoy
The Double Dealer	1978	Lord Touchwood	National
The Fruits of Enlightenment	1979	The Master	National
The Wild Duck	1979	Old Ekdal	National
Early Days	1980	Kitchen	National and North American tour
The Understanding	1982	Leonard	Strand
Inner Voices	1983	Don Alberto	National

== Radio plays ==
Richardson's radio plays
Play	Year
The City	1929
Scenes from Julius Caesar	1929
Twelfth Night	1929
Captain Brassbound's Conversion	1929
Scenes from King Lear	1930
Romeo and Juliet	1932
Macbeth	1933
The Tempest	1933
Julius Caesar	1933
A Midsummer Night's Dream	1934
Through the Looking-Glass	1935
In Memoriam	1936
The Tempest	1936
Candida	1937
Johnson Over Jordan	1940
Job	1941
The Shoemaker's Holiday	1942
Doctor Faustus	1942
Don Quixote	1943
Peer Gynt	1944
Cyrano de Bergerac	1945
Henry IV, Parts 1 and 2	1945
Victory Programme	1945
Moby-Dick	1946
The Rubáiyát of Omar Khayyám	1947
Brand	1949
Home at Seven	1951
A Midsummer Night's Dream	1953
The White Carnation	1953
Play	1958
Richard II	1960
Hamlet	1961
Arms and the Man	1961
The Ballad of Reading Gaol	1963
The Merchant of Venice	1963
A Christmas Carol	1964
Cyrano de Bergerac	1966
Heartbreak House	1968
When We Dead Awaken	1969
Much Ado About Nothing	1969
John Gabriel Borkman	1974
The Phoenix and the Turtle	1976
The Passionate Pilgrim	1976
Programme on William Blake	1977
Readings from Andrew Marvell	1978
Notes on a Cellar Book	1980
Little Tich – Giant of the Halls	1982

== Film roles ==
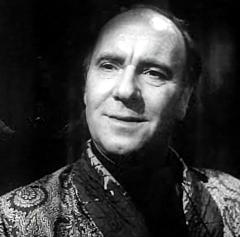
Richardson in the 1962 film, Long Day's Journey into Night

Richardson's filmography
Film	Year	Role	Ref.
Dreyfus	1931	Uncredited extra	
The Ghoul	1933	Nigel Hartley	
Friday the Thirteenth	1933	Horace Dawes	
The Return of Bulldog Drummond	1934	Hugh Drummond	
Java Head	1934	William Ammidon	
Thunder in the Air	1934	Family member	
The King of Paris	1934	Paul Lebrun	
Bulldog Jack	1935	Morelle	
Things to Come	1936	The Boss	
The Man Who Could Work Miracles	1936	Colonel Winstanley	
Thunder in the City	1937	Henry Manningdale	
The Divorce of Lady X	1938	Lord Mere	
South Riding	1938	Robert Carne	
The Citadel	1938	Dr Denny	
The Lion Has Wings	1939	Wing Commander	
Q Planes	1939	Major Hammond	
The Four Feathers	1939	Captain Durrance	
On the Night of the Fire	1939	Will Kobling	
The Silver Fleet	1943	Jaap van Leyden	
The Volunteer	1944	himself	
School for Secrets	1946	Professor Heatherville	
Anna Karenina	1948	Karenin	
The Fallen Idol	1948	Baines	
The Heiress	1949	Dr Austin Sloper	
Outcast of the Islands	1951	Captain Lingard	
Home at Seven	1952	David Preston	
The Sound Barrier	1952	John Richfield	
The Holly and the Ivy	1952	The Rev Martin Gregory	
Richard III	1955	Buckingham	
The Passionate Stranger	1956	Professor Wynter and Sir Clement Hathaway	
Smiley	1956	Lambeth	
Our Man in Havana	1959	C	
Oscar Wilde	1960	Sir Edward Carson	
Exodus	1960	General Sutherland	
Long Day's Journey into Night	1962	James Tyrone	
The 300 Spartans	1962	Themistocles	
Woman of Straw	1964	Charles Richmond	
Chimes at Midnight	1965	Narrator	
Doctor Zhivago	1965	Alexander Gromeko	
The Wrong Box	1966	Joseph Finsbury	
Khartoum	1966	W. E. Gladstone	
Midas Run	1969	Henshaw	
Oh! What a Lovely War	1969	Sir Edward Grey	
Battle of Britain	1969	Sir David Kelly	
The Bed Sitting Room	1969	Lord Fortnum	
The Looking Glass War	1969	Leclerc	
David Copperfield	1969	Wikins Micawber	
Whoever Slew Auntie Roo?	1971	Mr Benton	
Eagle in a Cage	1972	Sir Hudson Lowe	
Lady Caroline Lamb	1972	George IV	
Tales from the Crypt	1972	The Crypt Keeper	
Alice's Adventures in Wonderland	1972	Caterpillar	
A Doll's House	1973	Dr Rank	
O Lucky Man!	1973	Monty and Sir James Burgess	
Rollerball	1975	Head Librarian	
The Man in the Iron Mask	1977	Colbert	
Jesus of Nazareth	1977	Simeon	
Watership Down	1978	Chief rabbit (voice only)	
Dragonslayer	1981	Ulrich	
Time Bandits	1981	The Supreme Being	
Invitation to the Wedding	1983	Uncle Willie	
Give My Regards to Broad Street	1984	Jim	
Greystoke: The Legend of Tarzan, Lord of the Apes	1984	John Clayton	

== Television ==
Richardson's television appearances
Programme	Date	Channel	Role
Bees on the Boatdeck	1939		Sam Gridley
Everyman	1947		Voice of God
Fireside Theater: A Christmas Carol	December 1951	NBC (USA)	Ebenezer Scrooge
Alexander Korda, Kt.	4 March 1956	BBC Television	On-screen Participant
Salute to Show Business	20 September 1957		On-screen Participant
The Stars Rise in the West	14 January 1958		On-screen Participant
British Art and Artists: A Sculptor's Landscape	29 June 1958	BBC Television	On-screen Participant
Here and Now: City of London Festival	27 June 1962	ITV	On-screen Participant
Here and Now: Lord Mayor	5 July 1962	ITV	On-screen Participant
The Largest Theatre in the World: Heart to Heart	6 December 1962	BBC Television	Sir Stanley Johnson
Hedda Gabler	28 December 1962	BBC Television	Judge Brack
Voices of Man	1963		
The Great War	30 May – 22 November 1964	BBC Television	Douglas Haig
Thursday Theatre: Johnson Over Jordan	4 February 1965	BBC Television	Robert Johnson
The World of Wodehouse	24 February – 13 March 1967	BBC Television	Clarence, 9th Earl of Emsworth
Twelfth Night	1968	ITV	Sir Toby Belch
The Golden Years of Alexander Korda	27 December 1968	BBC Television	On-screen Participant
A Time To Remember: "Edwardian Summer"	30 April 1969		Narrator
A Time To Remember: "The Peace Makers"	2 July 1969		Narrator
The Battle for the Battle of Britain	13 September 1969	ITV	on-screen participant
Hassan	1970		Hassan
She Stoops to Conquer	1970		
Weekend Play: Twelfth Night	12 July 1970	ITV	Sir Toby Belch
Carol Channing's Mad English Tea Party	1971		
Play for Today: "Home"	6 January 1972	BBC Television	Jack
Frankenstein: The True Story	30 November 1973	NBC (USA)	Lacey
The Wednesday Special: Comets Among the Stars	25 February 1976	ITV	Professor Macleod
Your National Theatre	21 August 1976	ITV	On-screen Participant
This Is Your Life	15 February 1978	ITV	Guest (Note: The subject of the programme was Michael Croft.)
No Man's Land	3 October 1978	ITV	Hirst
Tonight in Town	23 March 1979	BBC Television	On-screen Participant
Pot Black	6 April 1979	BBC Television	Awards presenter
Parkinson	16 April 1979	BBC Television	On-screen Participant
Charlie Muffin	11 December 1979	ITV	Sir Archibald Willoughby
Chaos Supersedes ENSA	27 August 1980	ITV	Cast Member
Frank and Polly Muir's Big Dipper	14 December 1981	ITV	On-screen Participant
The Morecambe and Wise Christmas Show	23 December 1981	ITV	Cast Member
Early Days	1 August 1982	ITV	Cast Member
The South Bank Show: "Laurence Olivier – A Life"	17 October 1982	ITV	Cast Member
Witness for the Prosecution	4 December 1982	CBS	Sir Wilfred Robarts
Wagner	3 October – 11 December 1983		Pfordten

== Sound recordings ==
Richardson made multiple sound recordings, primarily during the 1950s and 1960s. Among these were adaptations of twelve Sherlock Holmes stories in which he played Dr. Watson opposite John Gielgud's Holmes, adaptations of A Christmas Carol and Swann's Way, poetry by Keats, Blake and Coleridge, and complete audio productions of Julius Caesar, Measure for Measure, Cyrano de Bergerac and The School for Scandal.

== Awards and honours ==
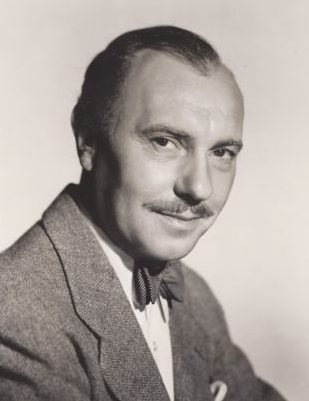
Richardson in 1949

Awards and honours presented to Richardson
Film or production	Year	Award	Category	Result	Ref.
The Fallen Idol	1949	National Board of Review	Best Actor	Won	
The Fallen Idol	1949	New York Film Critics Circle	Best Actor	Runner-up	
The Heiress	1949	National Board of Review	Best Actor	Won	
The Heiress	1949	New York Film Critics Circle	Best Actor	Runner-up	
The Heiress	1949	Academy Award	Best Supporting Actor	Nominated	
The Sound Barrier	1952	British Academy of Film and Television Arts Award	Best Actor in a Leading Role	Won	
The Sound Barrier	1952	National Board of Review	Best Actor	Won	
The Sound Barrier	1952	New York Film Critics Circle	Best Actor	Won	
The Waltz of the Toreadors	1957	Tony Award	Best Actor in a Play	Nominated	
Long Day's Journey into Night	1962	Cannes Film Festival	Best Actor (Note: Award shared with Jason Robards and Dean Stockwell)	Won	
Doctor Zhivago	1965	British Academy of Film and Television Arts Award	Best Actor in a Leading Role	Nominated	
Khartoum	1965	British Academy of Film and Television Arts Award	Best Actor in a Leading Role	Nominated	
The Wrong Box	1965	British Academy of Film and Television Arts Award	Best Actor in a Leading Role	Nominated	
Home	1971	Evening Standard Award	Outstanding Performance (Note: Co-winner with John Gielgud, also for Home)	Won	
Home	1971	Tony Award	Best Actor in a Play	Nominated	
Lady Caroline Lamb	1972	British Academy of Film and Television Arts Award	Best Actor in a Supporting Role	Nominated	
No Man's Land	1977	Outer Critics Circle Award	Outstanding Actor in a Play	Won	
No Man's Land	1977	Tony Award	Best Actor in a Play	Nominated	
—	1981	Laurence Olivier Award	Special Award	Won	
No Man's Land	1982	Grammy Award	Best Spoken Word, Documentary or Drama Recording (Note: Co-nomination with John Gielgud)	Nominated	
Greystoke: The Legend of Tarzan, Lord of the Apes	1984	National Society of Film Critics	Best Supporting Actor (posthumous)	Runner-up	
Greystoke: The Legend of Tarzan, Lord of the Apes	1984	New York Film Critics Circle	Best Supporting Actor (posthumous)	Won	
Greystoke: The Legend of Tarzan, Lord of the Apes	1984	Academy Award	Best Supporting Actor (posthumous)	Nominated	
Greystoke: The Legend of Tarzan, Lord of the Apes	1984	British Academy of Film and Television Arts Award	Best Actor in a Supporting Role (posthumous)	Nominated	

== See also ==
- List of British actors
- List of British Academy Award nominees and winners
- List of oldest and youngest Academy Award winners and nominees – Oldest nominees for Best Actor in a Supporting Role
- List of posthumous Academy Award winners and nominees
- List of actors with Academy Award nominations

== Notes and references ==
Notes

== Sources ==
- Cozad, W. Lee (2006). More Magnificent Mountain Movies. Lake Arrowhead, CA: Sunstroke Media. ISBN 978-0-9723372-3-6.
- Gaye, Freda, ed. (1967). Who's Who in the Theatre (fourteenth ed.). London: Sir Isaac Pitman and Sons. OCLC 5997224.
- Miller, John (1995). Ralph Richardson – The Authorized Biography. London: Sidgwick and Jackson. ISBN 0283062371.
- O'Neil, Thomas (2003). Movie Awards: The Ultimate, Unofficial Guide to the Oscars, Golden Globes, Critics, Guild and Indie Honors. London: Perigee Book. ISBN 978-0-399-52922-1.
- Who Was Who. London: A & C Black. 2012. (subscription required)
