= Frederick Piper =

English actor (1902–1979)

- in Passport to Pimlico (1949)
- Born: 23 September 1902; London, England
- Died: 22 September 1979 (aged 76); London, England
- Education: Central School of Speech and Drama
- Occupation: Actor
- Years active: 1920s (theatre) 1933–1971 (film)

Frederick Piper (23 September 1902 – 22 September 1979) was an English actor of stage and screen who appeared in over 80 films and many television productions in a career spanning over 40 years. Piper studied drama under Elsie Fogerty at the Central School of Speech and Drama, then based at the Royal Albert Hall, London.

Never a leading player, Piper was usually cast in minor, sometimes uncredited, parts, although he also appeared in some more substantial supporting roles. Piper never aspired to star status, but became a recognisable face on the British screen through the sheer volume of films in which he appeared. His credits include a number of films which are considered classics of British cinema, among them five 1930s Alfred Hitchcock films; he also appeared in many Ealing Studios productions, including some of the celebrated Ealing comedies.

== Stage career ==
Born in London, England, in September 1902, Piper worked as a tea merchant before starting his acting career on the stage in the 1920s, playing in London productions and also touring as far afield as Canada. He continued to appear in theatrical productions in the West End alongside his screen roles. These included appearances in the original runs of Barré Lyndon's The Man in Half Moon Street, Vernon Sylvaine's Nap Hand, N.C. Hunter's A Day by the Sea, Robert Bolt's Flowering Cherry, and Home at Seven and The White Carnation, both by R.C. Sheriff.

== Film career ==
His first film appearance came in the 1933 production The Good Companions.

An unassuming man with no trappings of ambition or conceit, Piper rapidly earned a reputation as a reliable, congenial presence on set and became a first choice for directors with smaller roles to cast, accumulating screen credits at the rate of up to six a year through to the 1960s. He appeared in a small role in Hitchcock's 1934 film The Man Who Knew Too Much (credited as 'Policeman with Rifle'), and the following year was cast again by Hitchcock in the role of the milkman in the famous scene with Robert Donat in The 39 Steps. Piper was only on screen for seconds, but the iconic nature of the scene ultimately made this probably his most famous film appearance.

Later minor roles for Hitchcock were Sabotage (1936 – as the doomed bus conductor), Young and Innocent (1937) and Jamaica Inn (1939 – as Charles Laughton's agent).

Piper's services were always in demand, and he is said to have once joked that he had cornered the market in unnamed police officers and barmen. From the late 1930s he became associated with Ealing Studios, appearing in dozens of their productions, from cheaply shot programmers through to the company's most prestigious films such as In Which We Serve (1942). Most of Piper's roles were fleeting and his name rarely appeared in promotional material, but there was an occasional more substantial part in films such as Nine Men (1943), The October Man (1947) and Hunted (1952). Other films include Hue and Cry, Passport to Pimlico (1949) and The Lavender Hill Mob (1951).

From the early 1960s film work began to dry up, but Piper continued to find work in television, a medium in which he had first appeared as early as 1938 in a production of J. B. Priestley's play Laburnum Grove for the fledgling BBC. His TV credits during the 1960s included popular series such as Danger Man, Dixon of Dock Green and cult favourite The Prisoner. Piper's last credit, however, was in a film, a minor role in the 1971 production Burke & Hare.

== Personal life ==
Piper lived in Windsor, Berkshire from the 1940s and was married to the theatre director Joan Riley; their son, Mark Piper, also became a theatre director. Frederick Piper died on 22 September 1979, one day short of his 77th birthday.

== Filmography ==
- 1933: The Good Companions - Ted Ogelthorpe
- 1934: Red Ensign - Mr. McWilliams (uncredited)
- 1934: The Man Who Knew Too Much - Policeman with Rifle (uncredited)
- 1935: The 39 Steps - The Milkman (uncredited)
- 1935: The Guv'nor - Gendarme (uncredited)
- 1936: Fame - Press Representative
- 1936: Everything Is Thunder - Policeman Denker
- 1936: Crown v. Stevens - Arthur Stevens
- 1936: Where There's a Will - Joe, Detective Taking Fingerprints (uncredited)
- 1936: Sabotage - Bus Conductor (uncredited)
- 1936: Jack of All Trades - Jimmy (Employment Clerk) (uncredited)
- 1937: Feather Your Nest - Mr. Green - The Recording Engineer (uncredited)
- 1937: Farewell Again - Minor Role (uncredited)
- 1937: Non-Stop New York - Barman (uncredited)
- 1937: Oh, Mr Porter! - Mr. Leadbetter - Railway Official (uncredited)
- 1937: Young and Innocent - Minor Role (uncredited)
- 1938: Climbing High - Official in Asylum Car (uncredited)
- 1938: They Drive by Night - Bartender (uncredited)
- 1939: Jamaica Inn - Davis - Sir Humphrey's Agent
- 1939: The Four Just Men - Pickpocket (uncredited)
- 1941: East of Piccadilly - Ginger Harris
- 1941: 49th Parallel - David
- 1942: The Big Blockade - Malta official (uncredited)
- 1942: In Which We Serve - Edgecombe
- 1943: Nine Men - Banger Hill
- 1943: The Bells Go Down - Police Sergeant (uncredited)
- 1943: San Demetrio London - Boatswain W.E. Fletcher
- 1944: It Happened One Sunday - (uncredited)
- 1944: Champagne Charlie - Learoyd
- 1944: Fiddlers Three - Auctioneer
- 1944: The Return of the Vikings - Sgt. Fred Johnson
- 1945: Johnny Frenchman - Zacky Penrose
- 1945: Pink String and Sealing Wax - Dr. Pepper
- 1947: Hue and Cry - Mr. Kirby
- 1947: The Loves of Joanna Godden - Isaac Turk
- 1947: The October Man - Det. Insp. Godby
- 1947: Master of Bankdam - Ben Pickersgill
- 1947: It Always Rains on Sunday - Det. Sergt. Leech
- 1948: Escape - Brownie - convict
- 1948: Penny and the Pownall Case - Policeman
- 1948: My Brother's Keeper - Camp Caretaker
- 1948: To the Public Danger (Short) - Labourer
- 1948: Fly Away Peter - Mr. Hapgood
- 1948: Look Before You Love - Miller
- 1949: The History of Mr. Polly - Mr. Wintershed (uncredited)
- 1949: Vote for Huggett - Mr. Bentley
- 1949: Passport to Pimlico - Garland
- 1949: It's Not Cricket - Yokel
- 1949: Don't Ever Leave Me - Max Marshall
- 1950: The Blue Lamp - Alf Lewis
- 1951: The Lavender Hill Mob - Cafe Owner (uncredited)
- 1952: Hunted - Mr. Sykes
- 1952: Home at Seven - Mr. Petherbridge
- 1952: Brandy for the Parson - Customs Inspector
- 1952: Escape Route - Inspector Reid
- 1953: Cosh Boy - Mr. Easter (uncredited)
- 1953: Deadly Nightshade - Mr. Pritchard
- 1954: Devil on Horseback - Miner
- 1954: Conflict of Wings - Joe Bates
- 1954: The Rainbow Jacket - Lukey
- 1954: Lease of Life - The Jeweller
- 1955: Doctor at Sea - Sandyman
- 1955: Value for Money - Broadbent Snr. in photograph (uncredited)
- 1956: The Man in the Road - Medwood Inspector Hayman
- 1957: The Passionate Stranger - Mr. Poldy
- 1957: Suspended Alibi - Mr. Beamster
- 1957: Doctor at Large - Ernest (uncredited)
- 1957: Second Fiddle - Potter
- 1957: The Birthday Present - Careers Officer
- 1957: Barnacle Bill - Barman
- 1958: Dunkirk - Small Boat Owner (uncredited)
- 1959: Violent Moment - Jenkins
- 1960: A Touch of Larceny - Hall Porter (uncredited)
- 1960: Evidence in Concrete - Hall Porter (uncredited)
- 1960: The Day They Robbed the Bank of England - Policeman (uncredited)
- 1960: Dead Lucky - Harvey Walters
- 1961: Very Important Person - 2nd Scientist in Corridor
- 1961: The Monster of Highgate Ponds - Sam
- 1961: The Frightened City - Ogle
- 1961: What a Carve Up! - Hearse Driver
- 1961: Return of a Stranger - Fred
- 1962: Only Two Can Play - Mr. Davies
- 1962: Reach for Glory - Policeman
- 1962: The Piper's Tune - Gonzales
- 1963: Ricochet - Siddall
- 1964: Becket - Monk (uncredited)
- 1965: One Way Pendulum - Usher / Office Clerk
- 1965: Catacombs - Inspector Murcott
- 1965: He Who Rides a Tiger - Mr. Steed
- 1971: Burke & Hare - Lodger (final film role)
