= Home at Seven =

Home at Seven may refer to:

- Home at Seven (play), a 1950 mystery play by R. C. Sheriff
- Home at Seven (film), a 1952 film adaptation starring Ralph Richardson
