= The Case for the Crown =

1934 British film by George A. Cooper

- Press kit
- Directed by: George A. Cooper
- Written by: Sherard Powell
- Based on: short story An Error of Judgement by Anthony Gittins
- Produced by: George A. Cooper
- Starring: Miles Mander; Meriel Forbes; Whitmore Humphries
- Production company: British and Dominions
- Distributed by: Paramount British Pictures
- Release date: 9 November 1934
- Running time: 70 minutes
- Country: United Kingdom
- Language: English

The Case for the Crown is a 1934 British crime film directed by George A. Cooper and starring Miles Mander, Meriel Forbes and Whitmore Humphries. It was written by Sherard Powell based on the short story ''An Error of Judgement'' by Anthony Gittins, and was made at British and Dominions Elstree Studios as a quota quickie for release by Paramount Pictures.

== Preservation status ==
The British Film Institute National Archive holds a collection of ephemera and stills but no film or video materials.

== Plot ==
Business tycoon James Rainsford is found by his junior partner, Roy Matherson, with his throat cut. Assuming it was suicide, and because he wishes to spare the feelings of Shirley, Rainsford's daughter, with whom he is love, Matherson fakes the scene to make it look like a murder. It turns out that it is actually murder, and Matherson is charged. In court, it looks like he will be convicted, until the defending counsel reveals the murderer to be another partner in the company.

== Cast ==
- Miles Mander as James L. Barton
- Meriel Forbes as Shirley Rainsford
- Whitmore Humphries as Roy Matherson
- Lawrence Anderson as Roxy, counsel for the Defence
- David Horne as James Rainsford
- Gordon McLeod as Prosecution
- John Turnbull as Professor Lawrence

== Reception ==
The Daily Film Renter wrote: "Opening leisurely, but tempo speeds up with arrival of courtroom episodes, which have definite dramatic strength. Early reels padded with crude and irrelevant cockney humour."

Picture Show wrote: "Opening rather slowly, this murder mystery drama begins to gain suspense and interest when the trial scenes are reached. ... Acting honours go to Lawrence Anderson as counsel for the defence, and Gordon McLeod as counsel prosecuting."

TV Guide called the film "another dull British courtroom drama."
