= Bees on the Boat Deck =

Play by J. B. Priestley (1936)

- Written by: J.B. Priestley
- Original language: English
- Genre: Comedy drama

Premiere
- Date premiered: 3 May 1936
- Place premiered: Lyric Theatre, London

Bees on the Boat Deck is a 1936 comedy drama play by the British writer J.B. Priestley.

It ran for 37 performances at the Lyric Theatre in London's West End. The cast included Laurence Olivier, Ralph Richardson, Rene Ray and Raymond Huntley.

In 1939 the play was made into a television film by the BBC, starring Richardson, James Mason, John Laurie and Meriel Forbes.

== Bibliography ==
- Gindin, James. British Fiction in the 1930s: The Dispiriting Decade. Springer, 2016.
- Wearing, J.P. The London Stage 1930-1939: A Calendar of Productions, Performers, and Personnel. Rowman & Littlefield, 2014.
