= The Fortnight in September =

1931 novel by R. C. Sherriff

- First edition cover
- Author: R. C. Sherriff
- Set in: England
- Published: 1931
- Publisher: Victor Gollancz Ltd
- Publication place: United Kingdom

The Fortnight in September is R. C. Sherriff's first novel. It follows an ordinary lower middle class English family on their annual holiday from London to the seaside resort of Bognor Regis. The book was first published in 1931 by Victor Gollancz Ltd to glowing reviews; twenty-first-century republications by Persephone Books in the UK and Scribner in the US have resulted in further enthusiastic notices.

== Plot ==
The Stevens are a lower middle class family who live in a small mid-terrace house near the railway in Dulwich. Since their marriage twenty years ago, they and their growing family have taken an annual two-week summer holiday at the coastal resort of Bognor. For Mr Stevens, an accounts clerk at the London firm of Jackson & Tidmarsh, the holiday is the family's highlight, and he plans meticulously. Mrs Stevens, though, has never much enjoyed her time away; she fears the sea and she finds the crowds stressful. Yet she has never said anything, and tries to find pleasure in the family's delight.

Mr Stevens presides over a meticulous schedule of preparations before supper on what he calls Going Away Eve, to him one of the best evenings of the year. The children, Mary, 19, Dick, 17, and Ernie, 10, all have tasks. The next morning, leaving their house key with a neighbour, they walk to the railway station for the train to Bognor. On the journey, Mrs Stevens recollects the disappointments of her husband's past, including his disastrous resignation as founding secretary of the local football club. Mr Stevens daydreams about the time twenty years ago when he first met his wife, and his mild disappointment that she had never found the knack of making friends. He looks forward to his usual evening trips to the local pub, the little jokes he will share with the barmaid, and the companionship of the regulars.

After a long journey, they check in at Mrs Huggett's run-down boarding house, 'Seaview', where they stay every year. The family settle into their familiar holiday routines: daily strolls, cricket on the beach, listening to the band, and bathing in the sea. Mr Stevens takes a long walk and reflects on his life, his job, and his marriage. He remains disappointed that he was overlooked for promotion, but consoles himself that his wife and home have represented his refuge. As he returns, he becomes more optimistic, planning what he intends to do when his big stroke of luck comes.

Dick works as a junior clerk in a stationer's office, a job that his father had found for him, but that he hates. He knows that his father is extremely proud, and is devastated that he is unable to feel grateful. Once a top boy athlete at school, he has since become disillusioned at his old school's poverty and its pretentiousness. Suddenly his thoughts take quite a new tack, and instead of anger he starts to feel a sense of obligation, realising he could do something to turn the sham pride of the school into reality. He resolves to work towards a new career, perhaps architecture.

At the beach, Mary bumps into Jessica, a girl of about her own age, who invites her to meet up that evening for a walk along the promenade. This is new and exciting for Mary, who has a very restricted life as a dressmaker's assistant. Near the pier they make the acquaintance of two young men – one of whom, Pat, is an actor with a travelling theatre company. Mary and Pat meet regularly over several evenings, sitting in the public seats on the pier and taking the opportunity for some gentle flirtation. Their tentative romance ends naturally when Pat's company moves on.

Mr Stevens is approached by a vulgar-looking man, Mr Montgomery, one of Jackson & Tidmarsh's richest and most important clients. He invites the family to tea at his luxurious but vulgar holiday home. Though the afternoon is a trial, all acquit themselves well, and Mr Stevens hopes that this contact will improve his standing in the eyes of his company's directors.

Mrs Huggett seems ill and admits that she is finding it increasingly difficult to keep up the boarding house. Her regular guests are looking for higher quality accommodation and are not returning. Mrs Stevens promises that the family will always support her, although Mr Stevens realises that the traditions he values cannot last forever. The family bid farewell to Mrs Huggett, who inquires whether they have found everything satisfactory. Mr Stevens replies that it is always all right at 'Seaview'.

== Principal characters ==
- Mr Ernest Stevens, husband and father; accounts clerk at Jackson & Tidmarsh
- Mrs Flossie Stevens, wife of Mr Stevens
- Mary Stevens, daughter, aged 19; dressmaker's assistant
- Dick Stevens, elder son, aged 17; stationer's clerk
- Ernie Stevens, younger son, aged 10
- Mrs Huggett, landlady of 'Seaview' in Bognor
- Jessica ("Billie"), acquaintance of Mary
- Pat, actor with a travelling theatre company
- Mr Montgomery, client of Jackson & Tidmarsh

== Background ==
In his 1968 autobiography No Leading Lady, Sherriff explained that the idea for the novel came to him during a seaside holiday at Bognor as he sat on the promenade watching passing families, and imagining their home lives. His initial efforts to write a novel based on a fictional family's holiday by the sea were unsuccessful, and he concluded that rather than groping for too high a literary style he should write about his characters using the simple, uncomplicated words that they would use themselves. Having found his level, the author found that he was able to walk easily with his characters, side-by-side. He wrote without a plan, remaining in sympathy with his characters "because when they went to bed each night they knew no more about what was going to happen the next day than I did".

When the book was finished, Sherriff timidly sent the manuscript to the only literary agent he knew, Victor Gollancz, who declared it 'delightful' and said that he would gladly publish it without altering a word. The author was surprised with the book's immediate commercial success, and the 'magnificent' notices it received in the press. He speculated that its popularity perhaps derived from its being "easy to read, with nothing grand or pretentious about it".

== Publication and critical reception ==
On its first publication by Gollancz in 1931, the novel became an immediate sensation, attracting enthusiastic reviews and selling 20,000 copies in Britain in its first month. In 2006 it was republished by Persephone Books, and in 2021 Scribner republished it in the US, resulting in further adulatory reviews.

Asked by The Guardian in 2020 to pick 'books to inspire, uplift, and offer escape' during the COVID-19 pandemic, Kazuo Ishiguro recommended The Fortnight in September as "just about the most uplifting, life-affirming novel I can think of right now." Ishiguro praised Sherriff's unpatronising respect for the family he writes about: for their instinctive decency, and for their unselfconscious family happiness despite individual insecurities and frustrations. He considered the beautiful dignity of everyday living rarely to have been captured more delicately.

Lucy Scholes, writing in The Paris Review in 2021 considered the novel to be "an absolute delight from start to finish" in which "Sherriff’s tender observations of the family dynamics, and the simple joy each of them takes in the highlight of their year, prove him to be an unrivaled master of the quotidian."

Writing in 2025 for The Times, Clare Clark called the novel "deceptively artless and entirely beguiling", and a "period jewel" that brings out something extraordinary, even heroic, within the unremarkable lives of an unremarkable family.
