= Meriel Forbes =

English actress (1913–2000)

Meriel Forbes in 1943

Meriel Forbes, Lady Richardson (13 September 1913 – 7 April 2000) was an English actress. She was a granddaughter of Norman Forbes-Robertson and great-niece of Sir Johnston Forbes-Robertson. After making her stage debut with her father's touring company in 1929 she progressed via provincial repertory to the West End, where she appeared continually from the 1930s to the 1970s.

She married the actor Ralph Richardson in 1944, and the couple regularly appeared together in London, and on tour in the UK, continental Europe, Australia and North and South America. She appeared in fifteen films between 1934 and 1969.

== Life and career ==
Forbes was born Muriel Elsa Florence Forbes-Robertson in Fulham, London, daughter of Frank Forbes-Robertson and his wife Honoria, née McDermot. She was educated in Eastbourne, Brussels and Paris. At the age of sixteen she made her first stage appearance, in her father's touring company in 1929, as Mrs de Hooley in The Passing of the Third Floor Back by Jerome K Jerome. After a short spell with the Dundee Repertory company in 1931, she made her first London appearance in the same year, as Simone D'Ostignac in Porcupine Point by Gabriel Toyne.

In 1931 she joined the Birmingham Repertory company, and then worked mostly in the West End. She was briefly engaged to Robert Morley in the 1930s and later had an affair with Robert Donat.

In 1934 Forbes made her film debut in Girls, Please!, which starred the comic actor Sydney Howard. Among her West End roles was Daisy in The Amazing Dr Clitterhouse (1937), which starred Ralph Richardson. Most of her roles were in modern plays, but she was also cast in the classics, including The Rivals (as Julia at the Old Vic, 1938), and the Strand in 1940. In 1940 and 1941 she served in the auxiliary nursing organisation the Voluntary Aid Detachment. In 1944 she married the widowed Richardson. They had one son, Charles, who became a television stage manager.

Among the productions in which Forbes played in the early 1950s were The Philadelphia Story (1950) and The Millionairess (1953), and several plays with her husband, including a Ruritanian comedy, Royal Circle (1948), in which she played Katerina Fantina, the royal mistress, and Home at Seven (1950) as the barmaid on whom the resolution of the plot hinges. Richardson directed a film version of the play in 1952, with the couple playing their original stage roles.

In 1955, together with Sybil Thorndike and Lewis Casson, the Richardsons undertook a long tour of Australia, in Terence Rattigan's Separate Tables and The Sleeping Prince. Forbes and Richardson appeared on Broadway in Jean Anouilh's The Waltz of the Toreadors (1957). During Richardson's long West End run in Robert Bolt's Flowering Cherry (1958), he had three leading ladies in succession: Celia Johnson, Wendy Hiller and finally Forbes.

In 1959 Forbes took the part of the Duchess of Clausonnes in Noël Coward's Look After Lulu. The title role was played by her old friend Vivien Leigh, whose marriage to Laurence Olivier was on the verge of breakdown; Forbes devoted much time to supporting and comforting her. In 1962, Forbes played Lady Sneerwell to Richardson's Sir Peter Teazle in John Gielgud's production of The School For Scandal in London, New York and on a North American tour. Husband and wife were together again in 1964 as Bottom and Titania in A Midsummer Night's Dream, in a tour sponsored by the British Council, playing in South America, Lisbon, Paris, Madrid and Athens.

In 1967 husband and wife appeared together in a BBC television series, with Richardson playing Lord Emsworth in dramatisations of P G Wodehouse's Blandings Castle stories, and Forbes playing Emsworth's bossy sister Constance. Their co-star was Stanley Holloway as the butler, Beach. The performances divided critical opinion. The Times thought the stars "a sheer delight ... situation comedy is joy in their hands". The reviewers in The Guardian and The Observer thought the three too theatrical to be effective on the small screen. After fourteen films since 1934, her last screen role was in Oh! What a Lovely War (1969).

In 1973–74 Richardson and Forbes toured the comedy Lloyd George Knew My Father in Australia and North America, with Forbes in the role of Lady Boothroyd previously played in the West End by Peggy Ashcroft, and later by Celia Johnson.

The Richardsons lived in a large house near Regent's Park. After her husband died in 1983, Forbes moved to Belgravia. She was an enthusiastic supporter of theatrical charities. In 1994 she gave a lunch at the Connaught Hotel to mark Gielgud's ninetieth birthday. Her son Charles (1945–98) predeceased her.

Forbes died in London at the age of 86.

== Filmography ==
Year	Title	Role	Notes
1934	Girls, Please!	Ann Arundel	
1934	The Case for the Crown	Shirley Rainsford	
1934	Borrow a Million	Eileen Dacres	
1935	Vintage Wine		
1935	Mr. Cohen Takes a Walk	Sally O'Connor	
1936	The Belles of St. Clements	Natalie de Mailliere	
1939	Over the Moon	Miss Fortescue	Uncredited
1939	Young Man's Fancy	Miss Emily Crowther	
1939	Come On George!	Monica Bailey	
1942	The Day Will Dawn	Milly, the barmaid	
1943	The Gentle Sex	Junior Commander Davis	
1943	The Bells Go Down	Susie	
1946	The Captive Heart	Beryl Curtiss	
1951	The Long Dark Hall	Majorie Danns	
1952	Home at Seven	Peggy Dobson	
1969	Oh! What a Lovely War	Lady Grey	
1969	Battle of Britain	Lady Kelly	Uncredited, (final film role)
