= The Hopkins Manuscript =

1939 novel by R. C. Sherriff

- First edition cover
- Author: R. C. Sherriff
- Language: English
- Genre: Science fiction
- Set in: England
- Published: 1939
- Publisher: Victor Gollancz Ltd
- Publication place: United Kingdom
- Pages: 352

The Hopkins Manuscript is a dystopian science fiction novel by R. C. Sherriff, first published in 1939 by Victor Gollancz. In 1958 it was reissued in a revised edition as a Pan paperback under the title The Cataclysm. The novel was later republished under its original title by The Macmillan Company in 1963 and by Persephone Books in 2002.

The novel narrates the first-hand experiences of an Englishman, Edgar Hopkins, during the 1945 cataclysm in which the Moon collides with the Earth, followed by the subsequent collapse of civilisation. A foreword, set in the distant future, explores how a future civilisation reacts to the rediscovery of the ancient Hopkins Manuscript.

== Plot ==
A foreword to the novel, set nearly a thousand years in the future, recounts an archaeological expedition by the Royal Society of Abyssinia into the desolate wasteland that was once England. The damp English climate has destroyed almost all documents, leaving scant evidence of any former civilisation. By sheer chance, a scientist discovers a vacuum flask concealed within a crumbling wall. Inside lies a preserved manuscript – the sole surviving English account of the cataclysm and the subsequent collapse of Western civilisation.

The manuscript’s author, Edgar Hopkins, is a retired teacher, amateur astronomer and poultry breeder who takes great pride in his successes at local poultry shows. Hopkins is a deeply provincial and self-centred man, but his quiet West Country village life changes completely in October 1944 when he is summoned to London for an urgent meeting of the British Lunar Society, of which he is a member. The Society’s President announces to its members, in the strictest confidence, that, for reasons unknown, the Moon has been knocked out of its orbit and is spiralling towards Earth. Impact is expected in seven months. A direct collision would mean the total destruction of all human life, though there remains a slim chance of survival if the Moon delivers only a glancing blow.

To prevent widespread panic, world governments agree to conceal the truth. Under the guise of protecting the public from a fabricated foreign threat, local communities are ordered to construct deep dug-outs with iron doors. Hopkins volunteers for the effort, taking smug satisfaction in his secret knowledge of the true purpose of these shelters.

As the Moon draws nearer, its increasing size becomes evident and the government is forced to admit the truth. On the day of impact Hopkins chooses not to shelter in the local dug-out, preferring to stay at home. When the Moon strikes, hurricanes, floods, and earthquakes cause devastation, but Hopkins survives. With few other villagers remaining, Hopkins invites two young neighbours, Pat and Robin, aged 20 and 17 respectively, to live with him.

They learn that the Moon has crashed into the Atlantic Ocean, flattening itself on impact, and that almost the entire ocean is now dry land from America to Western Europe. The task of reconstruction begins rapidly, with international animosities set aside. However, Britain finds itself at a disadvantage, as the blocked Atlantic severs sea routes to its empire and overseas territories. European nations agree to allow Britain an open land corridor across the Moon down to Gibraltar and the Mediterranean.

This fragile cooperation is disrupted by reports from a Moon survey team. Contrary to expectations, the Moon contains vast deposits of valuable resources, including gold, oil and coal. The discovery ignites fierce competition, with European nations withdrawing agreement to Britain’s land corridor and demanding a greater share of the Moon’s riches. Fighting erupts across Europe.

In London, power is seized by Major Jagger, a fanatic who insists that Britain must abandon negotiations and take the lead in subjugating other European nations to enforce peace. Both Pat and Robin leave to join the war effort.

Over the next two years all semblance of local and national organisation disintegrates. When it becomes clear that Pat and Robin will never return, Hopkins resolves to seek out his aunt and uncle among the ruins of London. Upon reaching Notting Hill he finds their house still standing but evidently abandoned, and he moves in. Before long he learns from a fellow survivor of news that never reached his isolated village: while the nations of Europe were locked in conflict, a vast army led by Selim the Liberator, a charismatic Persian leader, had swept across from the East to destroy their hated white oppressors.

As his end approaches, some seven years after the cataclysm, Hopkins holes himself up and feverishly records his memories in a self-titled "Hopkins Manuscript" that he hopes will one day shed light on these dark times. However, as the novel's foreword has already revealed, when the manuscript is rediscovered nearly a thousand years later it is dismissed by the new Eastern civilisation as a worthless narrative by a man of limited vision that sheds little light on the downfall of the ancient Western world.

== Critical reception ==
Time magazine's 1939 review described the book as a "demi-Wellsian Downfall of the West [that] packs a clammy warning". Kirkus Reviews praised the novel as "fantasy and whimsy as it should be done", and commended the author's lovely sense of detail and satirical spoofing. The reviewer likened the book to an H. G. Wells concept executed in the style of Margery Sharp. Alec Nevala-Lee writing for The New York Times stated that the message of The Hopkins Manuscript would "powerfully resonate with readers whose consciences are troubled by inequality and climate change".
