= Ralph Richardson =

English actor (1902–1983)

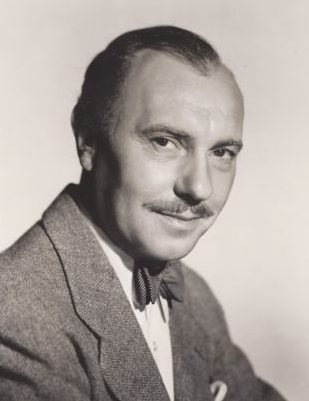
Richardson in 1949

Sir Ralph David Richardson (19 December 1902 – 10 October 1983) was an English actor. Along with his contemporaries John Gielgud, Michael Redgrave, and Laurence Olivier, he made up a quartet of male actors who dominated the British stage of the mid-20th century. Neverthless, he worked in films throughout most of his career, playing more than sixty cinema roles. From an artistic but not theatrical background, Richardson had no thought of a stage career until a production of Hamlet in Brighton inspired him to become an actor. He learned his craft in the 1920s with a touring company and later the Birmingham Repertory Theatre. In 1931 he joined the Old Vic, playing mostly Shakespearean roles. He led the company the following season, succeeding Gielgud, who had taught him much about stage technique. After he left the company, a series of leading roles took him to stardom in the West End and on Broadway.

In the 1940s, together with Olivier and John Burrell, Richardson was the co-director of the Old Vic company. There, his most celebrated roles included Peer Gynt and Falstaff. He and Olivier led the company to Europe and Broadway in 1945 and 1946, before their success provoked resentment among the governing board of the Old Vic, leading to their dismissal from the company in 1947. In the 1950s, in the West End and occasionally on tour, Richardson played in modern and classic works including The Heiress, Home at Seven, and Three Sisters. He continued on stage and in films until shortly before his sudden death at the age of eighty. He was celebrated in later years for his work with Peter Hall's National Theatre and his frequent stage partnership with Gielgud. He was not known for his portrayal of the great tragic roles in the classics, preferring character parts in old and new plays.

Richardson's film career began as an extra in 1931. He was soon cast in leading roles in British and American films including Things to Come (1936), The Fallen Idol (1948), Long Day's Journey into Night (1962) and Doctor Zhivago (1965). He received nominations and awards in the UK, Europe and the US for his stage and screen work from 1948 until his death. Richardson was twice nominated for the Academy Award for Best Supporting Actor, first for The Heiress (1949) and again (posthumously) for his final film, Greystoke: The Legend of Tarzan, Lord of the Apes (1984).

Throughout his career, and increasingly in later years, Richardson was known for his eccentric behaviour on and off stage. He was often seen as detached from conventional ways of looking at the world, and his acting was regularly described as poetic or magical.

== Life and career ==
=== Early years ===
Richardson was born in Cheltenham, Gloucestershire, the third son and youngest child of Arthur Richardson and his wife Lydia (née Russell) on 19 December 1902. The couple had met while both were in Paris, studying with the painter William-Adolphe Bouguereau. Arthur Richardson had been senior art master at Cheltenham Ladies' College from 1893.

She eloped with me, then aged four.

— Richardson on his mother's
breakup of the family

In 1907 the family split up; there was no divorce or formal separation, but the two elder boys, Christopher and Ambrose, remained with their father and Lydia left them, taking Ralph with her. The ostensible cause of the couple's separation was a row over Lydia's choice of wallpaper for her husband's study. According to John Miller's biography, whatever underlying causes there may have been are unknown. An earlier biographer, Garry O'Connor, speculates that Arthur Richardson might have been having an extramarital affair. There does not seem to have been a religious element, although Arthur was a dedicated Quaker, whose first two sons were brought up in that faith, whereas Lydia was a devout convert to Roman Catholicism, in which she raised Ralph. Mother and son had a variety of homes, the first of which was a bungalow converted from two railway carriages in Shoreham-by-Sea on the south coast of England.

Lydia wanted Richardson to become a priest. In Brighton he served as an altar boy, which he enjoyed, (Note: O'Connor comments that a youthful taste for ritual was common to Richardson and his two great contemporaries, John Gielgud and Laurence Olivier, the former from attending the Brompton Oratory and the latter from his days at the High Anglican choir school of All Saints, Margaret Street.) but when sent at about fifteen to the nearby Xaverian College, a seminary for trainee priests, he ran away. As a pupil at a series of schools he was uninterested in most subjects and was an indifferent scholar. His Latin was poor, and during church services he would improvise parts of the Latin responses, developing a talent for invention when memory failed that proved useful in his later career.

I was too lazy to be a painter ... I hadn't the persistency – but then I hadn't got very much talent.

— Richardson on his
time at art school

In 1919, aged sixteen, Richardson took a post as office boy with the Brighton branch of the Liverpool Victoria insurance company. The pay, ten shillings a week, was attractive, but office life was not; he lacked concentration, frequently posting documents to the wrong people as well as engaging in pranks that alarmed his superiors. (Note: Miller cites an occasion when Richardson climbed the façade of the building and entered the office through the window of an upper floor, horrifying his employer at the danger he had risked.) His paternal grandmother died and left him £500, which, he later said, transformed his life. He resigned from the office post, just in time to avoid being dismissed, and enrolled at the Brighton School of Art. His studies there convinced him that he lacked creativity, and that his drawing skills were not good enough.

Richardson left the art school in 1920, and considered how else he might make a career. He briefly thought of pharmacy and then of journalism, abandoning each when he learned how much study the former required and how difficult mastering shorthand for the latter would be. He was still unsure what to do, when he saw Sir Frank Benson as Hamlet in a touring production. He was thrilled, and felt at once that he must become an actor.

Buttressed by what was left of the legacy from his grandmother, Richardson determined to learn to act. He paid a local theatrical manager, Frank R. Growcott, ten shillings a week to take him as a member of his company and to teach him the craft of an actor. (Note: According to Hobson and Morley the weekly payment to Growcott was £1. O'Connor and Miller give the smaller sum.) He made his stage debut in December 1920 with Growcott's St Nicholas Players at the St Nicholas Hall, Brighton, a converted bacon factory. He played a gendarme in an adaptation of Les Misérables and was soon entrusted with larger parts, including Banquo in Macbeth and Malvolio in Twelfth Night.

=== Early career ===
The heyday of the touring actor-manager was nearing its end but some companies still flourished. As well as Benson's, there were those of Sir John Martin-Harvey, Ben Greet, and, only slightly less prestigious, Charles Doran. (Note: Doran had been a member of Benson's company for twenty years before setting up on his own account in 1920. He had a keen eye for rising talent, and among his recruits were Cecil Parker, Edith Sharpe, Norman Shelley, Abraham Sofaer, Francis L Sullivan and Donald Wolfit.) Richardson wrote to all four managers: the first two did not reply; Greet saw him but had no vacancy; Doran engaged him, at a wage of £3 a week. Richardson made his first appearance as a professional actor at the Marina Theatre, Lowestoft, in August 1921, as Lorenzo in The Merchant of Venice. He remained with Doran's company for most of the next two years, gradually gaining more important roles, including Banquo in Macbeth and Mark Antony in Julius Caesar.

Two of Richardson's mentors

Charles Doran

Sir Barry Jackson

Doran's company specialised in the classics, principally Shakespeare. After two years of period costumes Richardson felt the urge to act in a modern work. He left Doran in 1923 and toured in a new play, Outward Bound by Sutton Vane. He returned to the classics in August 1924, in Nigel Playfair's touring production of The Way of the World, playing Fainall. While on that tour he married Muriel Hewitt, a young member of Doran's company, known to him as "Kit". To his great happiness, the two were able to work together for most of 1925, both being engaged by Sir Barry Jackson of the Birmingham Repertory Theatre for a touring production of The Farmer's Wife. From December of that year they were members of the main repertory company in Birmingham. Through Jackson's chief director, the veteran taskmaster H. K. Ayliff, Richardson "absorbed the influence of older contemporaries like Gerald du Maurier, Charles Hawtrey and Mrs Patrick Campbell." Hewitt was seen as a rising star but Richardson's talents were not yet so apparent; he was allotted supporting roles such as Lane in The Importance of Being Earnest and Albert Prossor in Hobson's Choice.

Richardson made his London debut in July 1926 as the stranger in Oedipus at Colonus in a Sunday-night performance at the Scala Theatre, with a cast including Percy Walsh, John Laurie and D. A. Clarke-Smith. He then toured for three months in Eden Phillpotts's comedy Devonshire Cream with Jackson's company led by Cedric Hardwicke.

When Phillpotts's next comedy, Yellow Sands, was to be mounted at the Haymarket Theatre in the West End, Richardson and his wife were both cast in good roles. The play opened in November 1926 and ran until September 1928; with 610 performances it was the longest London run of Richardson's entire career. During the run Muriel Hewitt began to show early symptoms of encephalitis lethargica, a progressive and ultimately fatal illness.

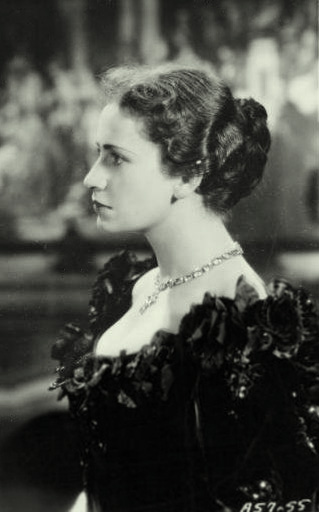
Peggy Ashcroft in 1936, near the beginning of her long professional association with Richardson

Richardson left the run of Yellow Sands in March 1928 and rejoined Ayliff, playing Pygmalion in Back to Methuselah at the Royal Court Theatre; also in the cast was a former colleague from the Birmingham Repertory, Laurence Olivier. The critics began to notice Richardson and he gained some favourable reviews. (Note: Horace Horsnell of The Observer wrote of "a stroke of something like genius" in Richardson's performance in The Taming of the Shrew, "and the idiosyncrasy that so refreshed the character was so cleverly sustained that one felt that Shakespeare would have enjoyed it too." St John Ervine, who disliked modern-dress productions of Shakespeare, nevertheless praised both the Richardsons.) As Tranio in Ayliff's modern-dress production of The Taming of the Shrew, Richardson played the character as a breezy cockney, (Note: Cockney according to the contemporary critics, though Richardson later said that he had been playing the part as an "outrageous Australian"; accents were not his strongest suit.) winning praise for turning a usually dreary role into something richly entertaining. For the rest of 1928 he appeared in what Miller describes as several unremarkable modern plays. For much of 1929 he toured South Africa in Gerald Lawrence's company in three period costume plays, including The School for Scandal, in which he played Joseph Surface. The sole venture into musical comedy of his career was in Silver Wings in the West End and on tour. It was not a personal triumph; the director's final injunction to the company was, "For God's sake don't let Richardson sing". In May 1930 Richardson was given the role of Roderigo in Othello in what seemed likely to be a prestigious production, with Paul Robeson in the title role. The biographer Ronald Hayman writes that though a fine singer, "Robeson had no ear for blank verse" and even Peggy Ashcroft's superb performance as Desdemona was not enough to save the production from failure. Ashcroft's notices were laudatory, while Richardson's were mixed; they admired each other and worked together frequently during the next four decades.

=== Old Vic, 1930–32 ===
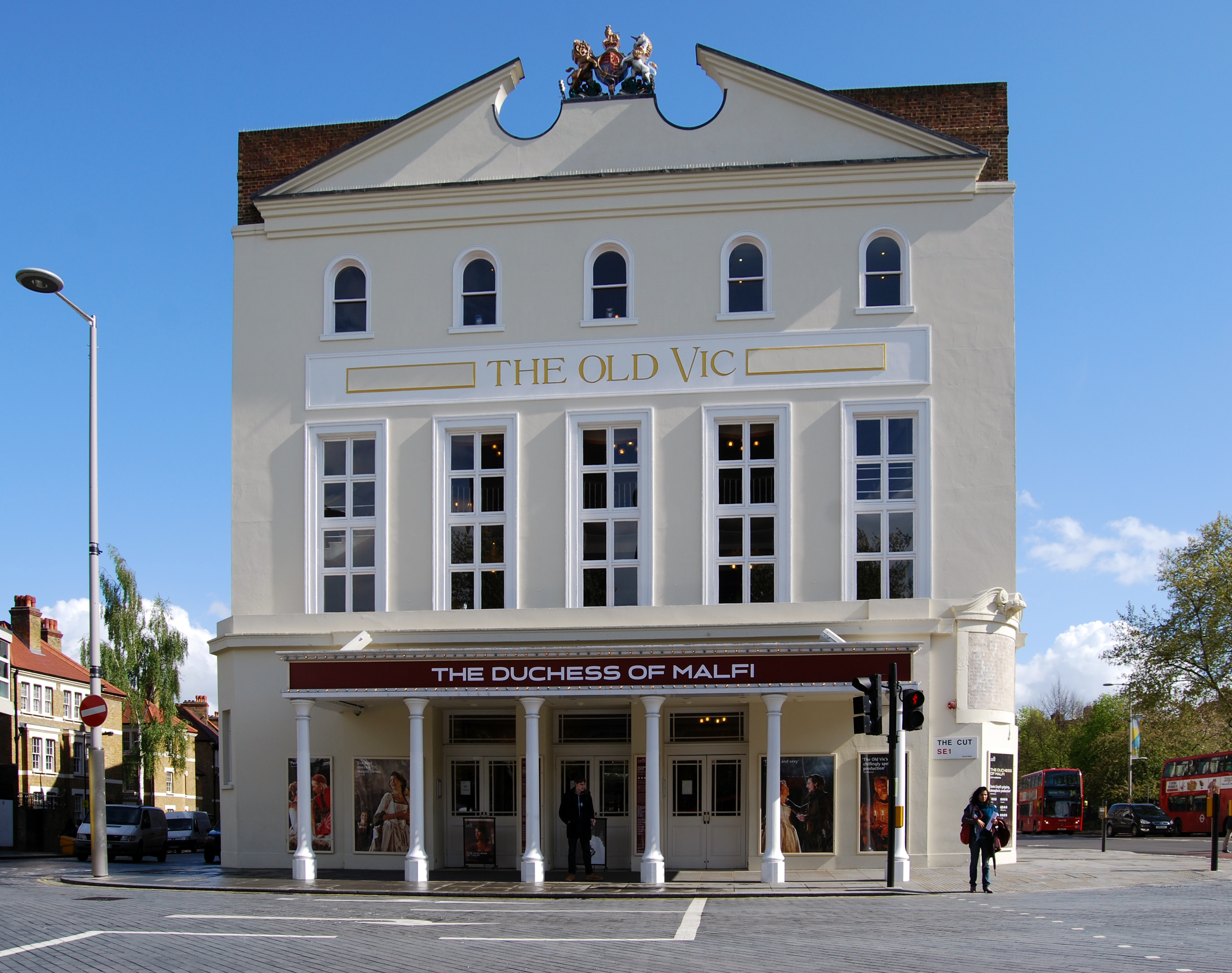
The Old Vic (photographed in 2012)

In 1930 Richardson, with some misgivings, accepted an invitation to join The Old Vic company. The theatre, in an unfashionable location south of the Thames, had offered inexpensive tickets for opera and drama under its proprietor Lilian Baylis since 1912. Its profile had been raised considerably by Baylis's producer, Harcourt Williams, who in 1929 persuaded the young West End star John Gielgud to lead the drama company. For the following season Williams wanted Richardson to join, with a view to succeeding Gielgud from 1931 to 1932. Richardson agreed, though he was not sure of his own suitability for a mainly Shakespearean repertoire, and was not enthusiastic about working with Gielgud: "I found his clothes extravagant, I found his conversation flippant. He was the New Young Man of his time and I didn't like him."

The first production of the season was Henry IV, Part 1, with Gielgud as Hotspur and Richardson as Prince Hal; the latter was thought by The Daily Telegraph "vivacious, but a figure of modern comedy rather than Shakespeare." Richardson's notices, and the relationship of the two leading men, improved markedly when Gielgud, who was playing Prospero, helped Richardson with his performance as Caliban in The Tempest:

He gave me about two hundred ideas, as he usually does, twenty-five of which I eagerly seized on, and when I went away I thought, "This chap, you know, I don't like him very much but by God he knows something about this here play." ... And then out of that we formed a friendship.

The friendship and professional association lasted until the end of Richardson's life. Gielgud wrote in 1983, "Besides cherishing our long years of work together in the theatre, where he was such an inspiring and generous partner, I grew to love him in private life as a great gentleman, a rare spirit, fair and balanced, devotedly loyal and tolerant and, as a companion, bursting with vitality, curiosity and humour." Among Richardson's other parts in his first Old Vic season, Enobarbus in Antony and Cleopatra gained particularly good notices. The Morning Post commented that it placed him in the first rank of Shakespearean actors. At the beginning of 1931 Baylis re-opened Sadler's Wells Theatre with a production of Twelfth Night starring Gielgud as Malvolio and Richardson as Sir Toby Belch. W. A. Darlington in The Daily Telegraph wrote of Richardson's "ripe, rich and mellow Sir Toby, [which] I would go many miles to see again."

During the summer break between the Old Vic 1930–31 and 1931–32 seasons, Richardson played at the Malvern Festival, under the direction of his old Birmingham director, Ayliff. Salaries at the Old Vic and the Festival were not large, and Richardson was glad of a job as an extra in the 1931 film Dreyfus. As his wife's condition worsened he needed to pay for more and more nursing; she was looked after in a succession of hospitals and care homes.

Succeeding Gielgud as leading man at the Old Vic, Richardson had a varied season, in which there were conspicuous successes interspersed with critical failures. James Agate was not convinced by him as the domineering Petruchio in The Taming of the Shrew; in Julius Caesar the whole cast received tepid reviews. In Othello Richardson divided the critics. He emphasised the plausible charm of the murderous Iago to a degree that Agate thought "very good Richardson, but indifferent Shakespeare", whereas The Times said, "He never stalked or hissed like a plain villain, and, in fact, we have seldom seen a man smile and smile and be a villain so adequately." His biggest success of the season was as Bottom in A Midsummer Night's Dream. Both Agate and Darlington commented on how the actor transformed the character from the bumbling workman to the magically changed creature on whom Titania dotes. Agate wrote that most of those who had played the part hitherto "seem to have thought Bottom, with the ass's head on, was the same Bottom, only funnier. Shakespeare says he was 'translated', and Mr Richardson translated him." With Sybil Thorndike as a guest star and Richardson as Ralph, The Knight of the Burning Pestle was a hit with audiences and critics, as was a revival of Twelfth Night, with Edith Evans as Viola and Richardson again playing Sir Toby, finishing the season to renewed praise.

=== West End and Broadway ===
Richardson returned to the Malvern Festival in August 1932. He was in four plays, the last of which, Bernard Shaw's Too True to Be Good, transferred to the New Theatre in London the following month. The play was not liked by audiences and ran for only forty-seven performances, but Richardson, in Agate's phrase, "ran away with the piece", and established himself as a West End star. In 1933 he had his first speaking part in a film, playing the villain, Nigel Hartley, in The Ghoul, which starred Cedric Hardwicke and Boris Karloff. The following year he was cast in his first starring role in a film, as the hero in The Return of Bulldog Drummond. The Times commented, "Mr Ralph Richardson makes Drummond as brave and stupid on the screen as he is in print." (Note: The Observer's review of the film read, in toto, "Hollywood is reported to be anxious because this B.I.P. production, with Ralph Richardson, has forestalled their own new Bulldog Drummond picture, with Ronald Colman. Hollywood need not worry." Richardson returned to the Bulldog Drummond series in a different role in the 1935 film Bulldog Jack.)

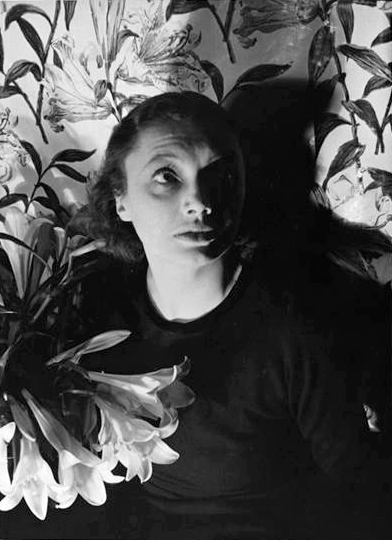
Katharine Cornell, leading lady in Richardson's Broadway debut

Over the next two years Richardson appeared in six plays in London ranging from Peter Pan (as Mr Darling and Captain Hook) to Cornelius, an allegorical play written for and dedicated to him by J. B. Priestley. Cornelius ran for two months; this was less than expected, and left Richardson with a gap in engagements in the second half of 1935. He filled it by accepting an invitation from Katharine Cornell and Guthrie McClintic to play Mercutio in their production of Romeo and Juliet on a US tour and on Broadway. Romeo was played by Maurice Evans and Juliet by Cornell. Richardson's performance greatly impressed American critics, and Cornell invited him to return to New York to co-star with her in Macbeth and Antony and Cleopatra, though nothing came of this.

In 1936, London Films released Things to Come, in which Richardson played the swaggering warlord "The Boss". His performance parodied the Italian dictator Benito Mussolini so effectively that the film was immediately banned in Italy. The producer was Alexander Korda; the two men formed a long and mutually beneficial friendship. Richardson later said of Korda, "Though not so very much older than I am, I regarded him in a way as a father, and to me he was as generous as a prince." In May 1936 Richardson and Olivier jointly directed and starred in a new piece by Priestley, Bees on the Boatdeck. Both actors won excellent notices, but the play, an allegory of Britain's decline, did not attract the public. It closed after four weeks, the last in a succession of West End productions in which Richardson appeared to much acclaim but which were box-office failures. In August of the same year he finally had a long-running star part, the title role in Barré Lyndon's comedy thriller, The Amazing Dr Clitterhouse, which played for 492 performances, closing in October 1937.

After a short run in The Silent Knight, described by Miller as "a Hungarian fantasy in rhymed verse set in the fifteenth century", Richardson returned to the Old Vic for the 1937–38 season, playing Bottom once again and switching parts in Othello, playing the title role, with Olivier as Iago. The director, Tyrone Guthrie, wanted to experiment with the theory that Iago's villainy is driven by suppressed homosexual love for Othello. Olivier was willing to co-operate, but Richardson was not; audiences and most critics failed to spot the supposed motivation of Olivier's Iago, and Richardson's Othello seemed underpowered. O'Connor believes that Richardson did not succeed with Othello or Macbeth because of the characters' single-minded "blind driving passion – too extreme, too inhuman", which was incomprehensible and alien to him. It was for the same reason, in O'Connor's view, that he never attempted the title roles in Hamlet or King Lear.

Richardson made his television debut in January 1939, reprising his 1936 stage role of the chief engineer in Bees on the Boatdeck. His last stage part in the 1930s was Robert Johnson, an Everyman figure, in Priestley's Johnson Over Jordan directed by Basil Dean. It was an experimental piece, using music (by Benjamin Britten) and dance as well as dialogue, and was another production in which Richardson was widely praised but that did not prosper at the box-office. After it closed, in May 1939, he did not act on stage for more than five years.

==== Second World War ====
At the outbreak of war Richardson joined the Royal Naval Volunteer Reserve as a sub-lieutenant pilot. He had taken flying lessons during the 1930s and had logged 200 hours of flying time, but, though a notoriously reckless driver, he admitted to being a timid pilot. He counted himself lucky to have been accepted, but the Fleet Air Arm was short of pilots. He rose to the rank of lieutenant-commander. His work was mostly routine administration, probably because of "the large number of planes which seemed to fall to pieces under his control", through which he acquired the nickname "Pranger" Richardson. He served at several bases in the south of England, and in April 1941, at the Royal Naval Air Station, Lee-on-Solent, he was able to welcome Olivier, newly commissioned as a temporary sub-lieutenant. Olivier rapidly eclipsed Richardson's record for pranging.

In 1942, on his way to visit his wife at the cottage where she was cared for by a devoted couple, Richardson crashed his motor-bike and was in hospital for several weeks. Kit was at that point mobile enough to visit him, but later in the year her condition worsened and in October she died. He was intensely lonely, though the camaraderie of naval life was some comfort. In 1944 he married again. His second wife was the actress Meriel Forbes, a member of the Forbes-Robertson theatrical family. The marriage brought him lifelong happiness and a son, Charles (1945–98), who became a television stage manager.

During the war Richardson compered occasional morale-boosting shows at the Royal Albert Hall and elsewhere, and made one short film and three full-length ones, including The Silver Fleet, in which he played a Dutch Resistance hero, and The Volunteer, a propaganda film in which he appeared as himself.

Throughout the war Guthrie had striven to keep the Old Vic company going, even after German bombing in 1942 left the theatre a near-ruin. A small troupe toured the provinces, with Sybil Thorndike at its head. By 1944, with the tide of the war turning, Guthrie felt it time to re-establish the company in a London base, and invited Richardson to head it. Richardson made two stipulations: first, as he was unwilling to seek his own release from the forces, the governing board of the Old Vic should explain to the authorities why it should be granted; secondly, that he should share the acting and management in a triumvirate. Initially he proposed Gielgud and Olivier as his colleagues, but the former declined, saying, "It would be a disaster, you would have to spend your whole time as referee between Larry and me." (Note: Gielgud, like almost everyone in theatrical circles, called Olivier "Larry", but Richardson invariably addressed Olivier as "Laurence". This striking formality did not extend to Gielgud, whom Richardson always called "Johnny".) It was finally agreed that the third member would be the stage director John Burrell. The Old Vic governors approached the Royal Navy to secure the release of Richardson and Olivier; the Sea Lords consented, with, as Olivier put it, "a speediness and lack of reluctance which was positively hurtful."

=== Old Vic, 1944–47 ===
The triumvirate secured the New Theatre for their first season and recruited a company. Thorndike was joined by, among others, Harcourt Williams, Joyce Redman and Margaret Leighton. It was agreed to open with a repertory of four plays: Peer Gynt, Arms and the Man, Richard III and Uncle Vanya. Richardson's roles were Peer, Bluntschli, Richmond and Vanya; Olivier played the Button Moulder, Sergius, Richard and Astrov. The first three productions met with acclaim from reviewers and audiences; Uncle Vanya had a mixed reception. The Times thought Olivier's Astrov "a most distinguished portrait" and Richardson's Vanya "the perfect compound of absurdity and pathos". Agate, on the other hand, commented, "'Floored for life, sir, and jolly miserable' is what Uncle Vanya takes three acts to say. And I just cannot believe in Mr Richardson wallowing in misery: his voice is the wrong colour." In 1945 the company toured Germany, where they were seen by many thousands of Allied servicemen; they also appeared at the Comédie-Française theatre in Paris, the first foreign company to be given that honour. The critic Harold Hobson wrote that Richardson and Olivier quickly "made the Old Vic the most famous theatre in the Anglo-Saxon world."

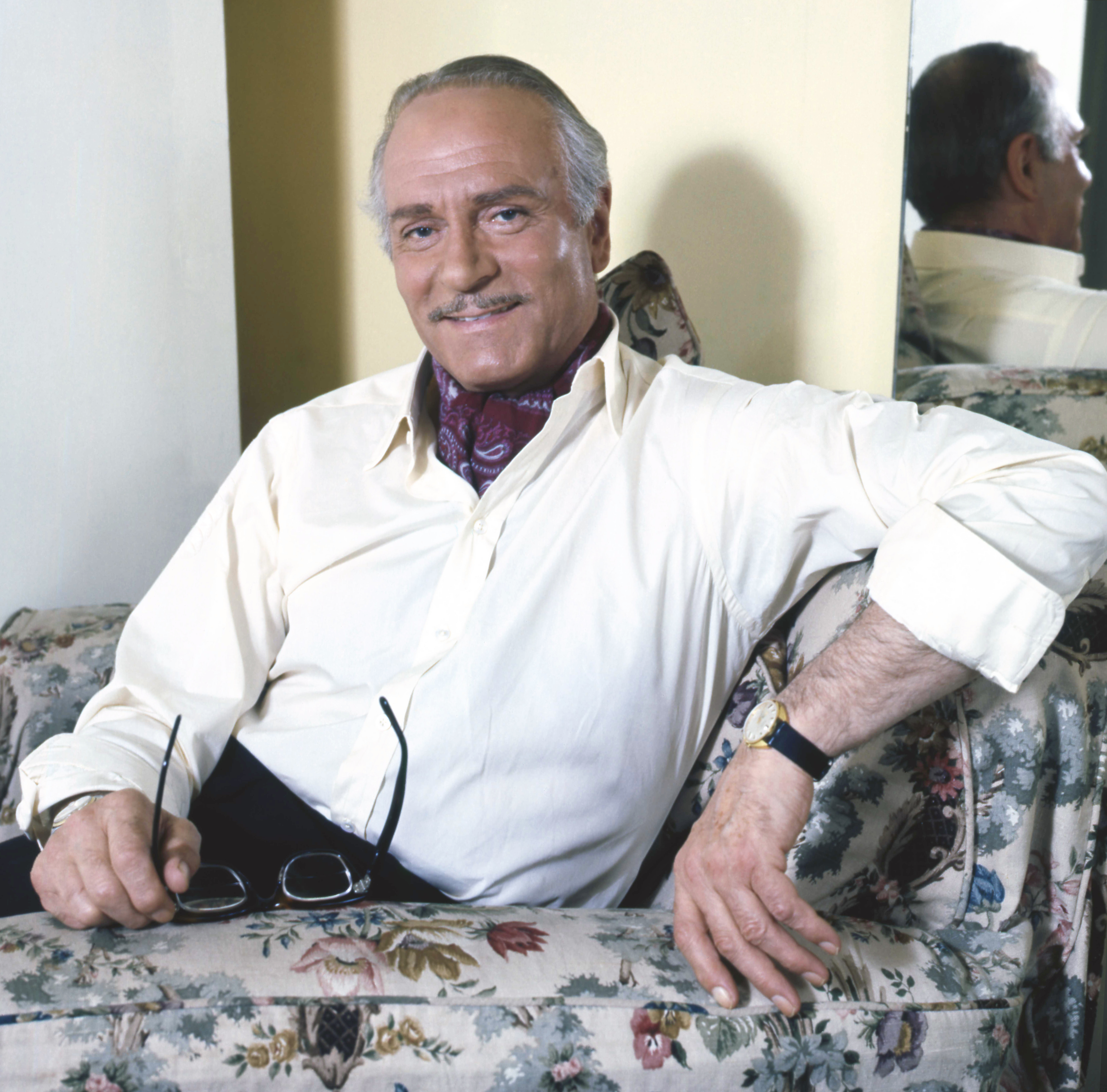
Laurence Olivier, Richardson's co-director of the Old Vic, photographed in 1972

The second season, in 1945, featured two double-bills. The first consisted of Henry IV, Parts 1 and 2. Olivier played the warrior Hotspur in the first and the doddering Justice Shallow in the second. (Note: The sources generally refer to the two parts of Henry IV as a double bill, although as full-length plays they were played across two separate evenings.) He received good notices, but by general consent the production belonged to Richardson as Falstaff. Agate wrote, "He had everything the part wants – the exuberance, the mischief, the gusto. ... Here is something better than virtuosity in character-acting – the spirit of the part shining through the actor." As a teenager, the director Peter Hall saw the production; he said fifty years later, "Of the performances I've seen in my life I'm gladdest I saw that." In the second double bill it was Olivier who dominated, in the title roles of Oedipus Rex and The Critic. Richardson took the supporting role of Tiresias in the first, and the silent, cameo part of Lord Burleigh in the second. After the London season the company played both the double-bills and Uncle Vanya in a six-week season on Broadway.

The third, and final, season under the triumvirate was in 1946–47. Olivier played King Lear, and Richardson, Cyrano de Bergerac. Olivier would have preferred the roles to be cast the other way about, but Richardson did not wish to attempt Lear. Richardson's other roles in the season were Inspector Goole in An Inspector Calls, Face in The Alchemist and John of Gaunt in Richard II, which he directed, with Alec Guinness in the title role.

During the run of Cyrano, Richardson was knighted in the 1947 New Year Honours, to Olivier's undisguised envy. The younger man received the accolade six months later, by which time the days of the triumvirate were numbered. The high profile of the two star actors did not endear them to the new chairman of the Old Vic governors, Lord Esher. He had ambitions to be the first head of the National Theatre and had no intention of letting actors run it. He was encouraged by Guthrie, who, having instigated the appointment of Richardson and Olivier, had come to resent their knighthoods and international fame. Esher terminated their contracts while both were out of the country, and they and Burrell were said to have "resigned".

Looking back in 1971, Bernard Levin wrote that the Old Vic company of 1944 to 1947 "was probably the most illustrious that has ever been assembled in this country". The Times said that the triumvirate's years were the greatest in the Old Vic's history; as The Guardian put it, "the governors summarily sacked them in the interests of a more mediocre company spirit".

=== International fame ===
For Richardson, parting company with the Old Vic brought the advantage of being free, for the first time, to earn substantial pay. The company's highest salary had been £40 a week. After his final Old Vic season he made two films in quick succession for Korda. The first, Anna Karenina, with Vivien Leigh, was an expensive failure, although Richardson's notices in the role of Karenin were excellent. The second, The Fallen Idol, had notable commercial and critical success, and won awards in Europe and America. It remained one of Richardson's favourites of his films. In Miller's words, "Carol Reed's sensitive direction drew faultless performances not just from Ralph as Baines (the butler and mistakenly suspected murderer), but also from Michèle Morgan as his mistress, Sonia Dresdel as his cold-hearted wife, and especially from Bobby Henrey as the distraught boy, Philippe."

Richardson had gained a national reputation as a great actor while at the Old Vic; films gave him the opportunity to reach an international audience. Unlike some of his theatre colleagues, he was never condescending about film work. (Note: Olivier, though he later became a Hollywood star, dismissed film in the 1930s as "this anaemic little medium which could not stand great acting". Gielgud said of a 1933 film role, "[It] appals my soul but appeals to my pocket.") He admitted that film could be "a cage for an actor, but a cage in which they sometimes put a little gold", but he did not regard filming as merely a means of subsidising his much less profitable stage work. He said, "I've never been one of those chaps who scoff at films. I think they're a marvellous medium, and are to the stage what engravings are to painting. The theatre may give you big chances, but the cinema teaches you the details of craftsmanship." The Fallen Idol was followed by Richardson's first Hollywood part. He played Dr Sloper, the overprotective father of Olivia de Havilland in The Heiress, based on Henry James's novel Washington Square. The film did not prosper at the box-office despite good reviews, an Academy Award for Best Actress for Havilland, and nominations for the director (William Wyler) and Richardson.

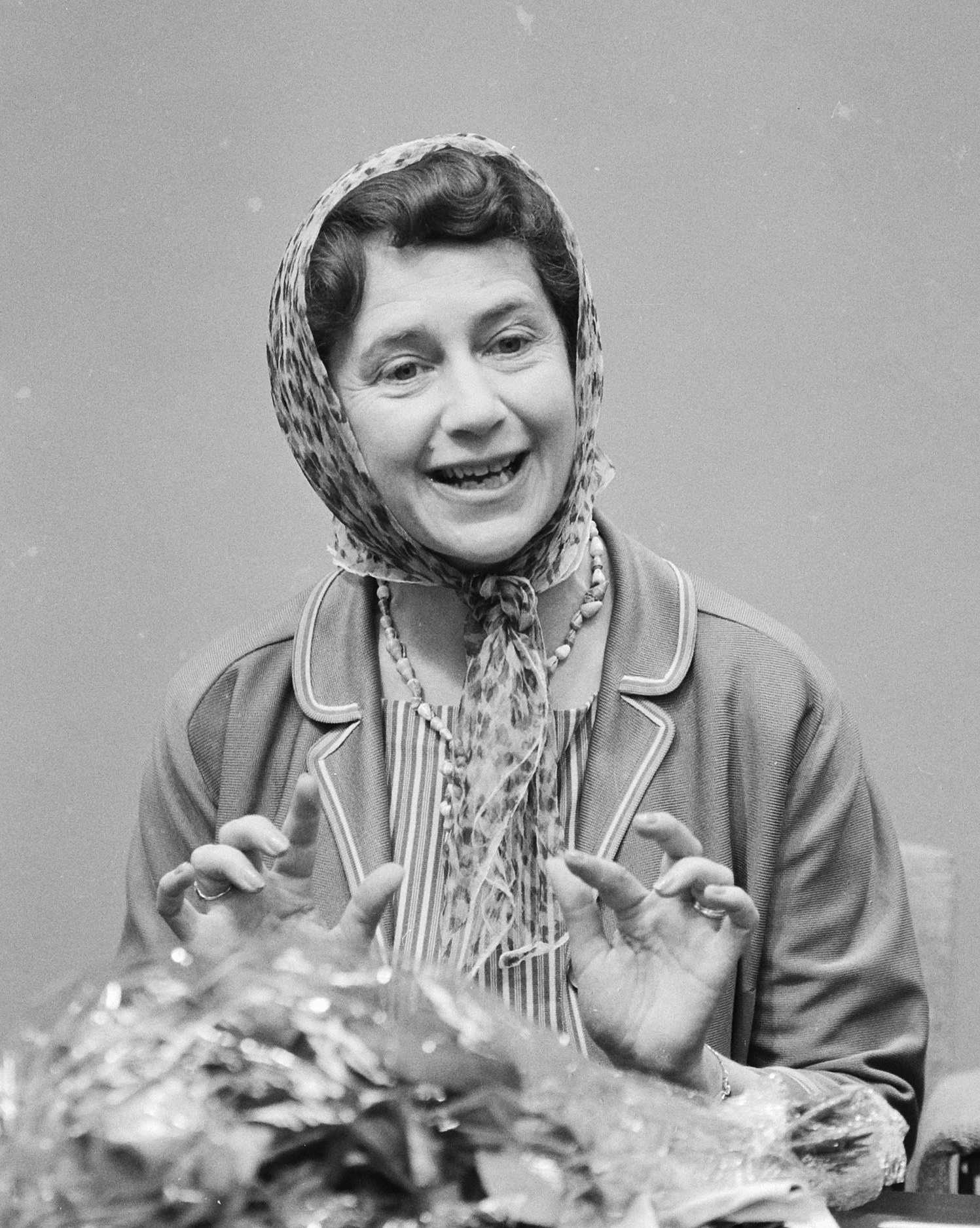
Peggy Ashcroft, with whom Richardson frequently co-starred

The Heiress had been a Broadway play before it was a film. Richardson so liked his part that he decided to play it in the West End, with Ashcroft as Sloper's daughter Catherine. The piece was to open in February 1949 at Richardson's favourite theatre, the Haymarket. Rehearsals were chaotic. Burrell, whom Richardson had asked to direct, was not up to the task – possibly, Miller speculates, because of nervous exhaustion from the recent traumas at the Old Vic. With only a week to go before the first performance, the producer, Binkie Beaumont, asked him to stand down, and Gielgud was recruited in his place. (Note: This was the end of Burrell's theatrical career in Britain. He emigrated to the US, where he became an academic, with only occasional directing jobs. His final post was professor of drama at the University of Illinois.) Matters improved astonishingly; the production was a complete success and ran in London for 644 performances. (Note: Richardson and Ashcroft left the cast in January 1950, and were replaced for the rest of the run by Godfrey Tearle and Wendy Hiller.)

After one long run in The Heiress, Richardson appeared in another, R. C. Sherriff's Home at Seven, in 1950. He played an amnesiac bank clerk who fears he may have committed murder. He later recreated the part in a radio broadcast, and in a film version, which was his sole venture into direction for the screen. Once he had played himself into a role in a long run, Richardson felt able to work during the daytime in films, and made two others in the early 1950s beside the film of the Sherriff piece: Outcast of the Islands, directed by Carol Reed, and David Lean's The Sound Barrier, released in 1951 and 1952 respectively. For the latter he won the BAFTA Award for Best Actor. With his characteristic liking for switching between modern roles and the classics, his next stage part was Colonel Vershinin in Three Sisters in 1951. He headed a strong cast, with Renée Asherson, Margaret Leighton and Celia Johnson as the sisters, but reviewers found the production weakly directed, and some felt that Richardson failed to disguise his positive personality when playing the ineffectual Vershinin. He did not attempt Chekhov again for more than a quarter of a century.

Richardson's playing of Macbeth suggests a fatal disparity between his temperament and the part

— The Times, June 1952

In 1952 Richardson appeared at the Stratford-upon-Avon Festival at the Shakespeare Memorial Theatre (forerunner of the Royal Shakespeare Company). His return to Shakespeare for the first time since his Old Vic days was keenly anticipated, but turned out to be a serious disappointment. He had poor reviews for his Prospero in The Tempest, judged too prosaic. In the second production of the festival his Macbeth, directed by Gielgud, was generally considered a failure. He was thought unconvincingly villainous; the influential young critic Kenneth Tynan professed himself "unmoved to the point of paralysis", though blaming the director more than the star. Richardson's third and final role in the Stratford season, Volpone in Ben Jonson's play, received much better, but not ecstatic, notices. He did not play at Stratford again.

Back in the West End, Richardson was in another Sherriff play, The White Carnation, in 1953, and in November of the same year he and Gielgud starred together in N. C. Hunter's A Day by the Sea, which ran at the Haymarket for 386 performances. During this period, Richardson played Dr Watson in an American/BBC radio co-production of Sherlock Holmes stories, with Gielgud as Holmes and Orson Welles as the evil Professor Moriarty. These recordings were later released commercially on disc.

In late 1954 and early 1955 Richardson and his wife toured Australia together with Sybil Thorndike and her husband, Lewis Casson, playing Terence Rattigan's plays The Sleeping Prince and Separate Tables. The following year he worked with Olivier again, playing Buckingham to Olivier's Richard in the 1955 film of Richard III. Olivier, who directed, was exasperated at his old friend's insistence on playing the role sympathetically.

Richardson turned down the role of Estragon in Peter Hall's premiere of the English language version of Samuel Beckett's Waiting for Godot in 1955, and later reproached himself for missing the chance to be in "the greatest play of my generation". He had consulted Gielgud, who dismissed the piece as rubbish, and even after discussing the play with the author, Richardson could not understand the play or the character. Richardson's Timon of Athens in his 1956 return to the Old Vic was well received, as was his Broadway appearance in The Waltz of the Toreadors for which he was nominated for a Tony Award in 1957. In August 1956, Richardson became the first president of The Youth Theatre, later the National Youth Theatre.

He concluded the 1950s with two contrasting West End successes, Robert Bolt's Flowering Cherry, and Graham Greene's The Complaisant Lover. The former, a sad piece about a failed and deluded insurance manager, ran for 435 performances in 1957–58; Richardson co-starred with three leading ladies in succession: Celia Johnson, Wendy Hiller and his wife. Greene's comedy was a surprise hit, running for 402 performances from June 1959. Throughout rehearsals the cast treated the love-triangle theme as one of despair, and were astonished to find themselves playing to continual laughter. During the run, Richardson worked by day on another Greene work, the film Our Man in Havana. Alec Guinness, who played the main role, noted "the object-lesson in upstaging in the last scene between Richardson and Noël Coward", faithfully captured by the director, Carol Reed.

=== 1960s ===
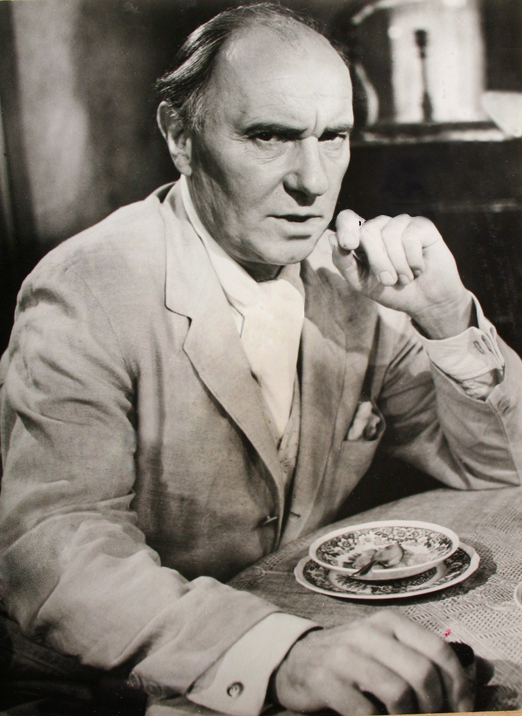
Richardson in Long Day's Journey into Night (1962)

Richardson began the 1960s with a failure. Enid Bagnold's play The Last Joke was savaged by the critics ("a meaningless jumble of pretentious whimsy" was one description). His only reason for playing in the piece was the chance of acting with Gielgud, but both men quickly regretted their involvement. Richardson then went to the US to appear in Sidney Lumet's film adaptation of Long Day's Journey into Night, alongside Katharine Hepburn. Lumet later recalled how little guidance Richardson needed. Once, the director went into lengthy detail about the playing of a scene, and when he had finished, Richardson said, "Ah, I think I know what you want – a little more flute and a little less cello". After that, Lumet was sparing with suggestions. Richardson was jointly awarded the Cannes Film Festival's Best Actor prize with his co-stars Jason Robards Jr and Dean Stockwell.

Richardson's next stage role was in a starry revival of The School for Scandal, as Sir Peter Teazle, directed by Gielgud in 1962. The production was taken on a North American tour, in which Gielgud joined the cast as, he said, "the oldest Joseph Surface in the business". A revival of Six Characters in Search of an Author in 1963 was judged by the critic Sheridan Morley to have been a high-point of the actor's work in the 1960s. Richardson joined a British Council tour of South Africa and Europe the following year; he played Bottom again, and Shylock in The Merchant of Venice.

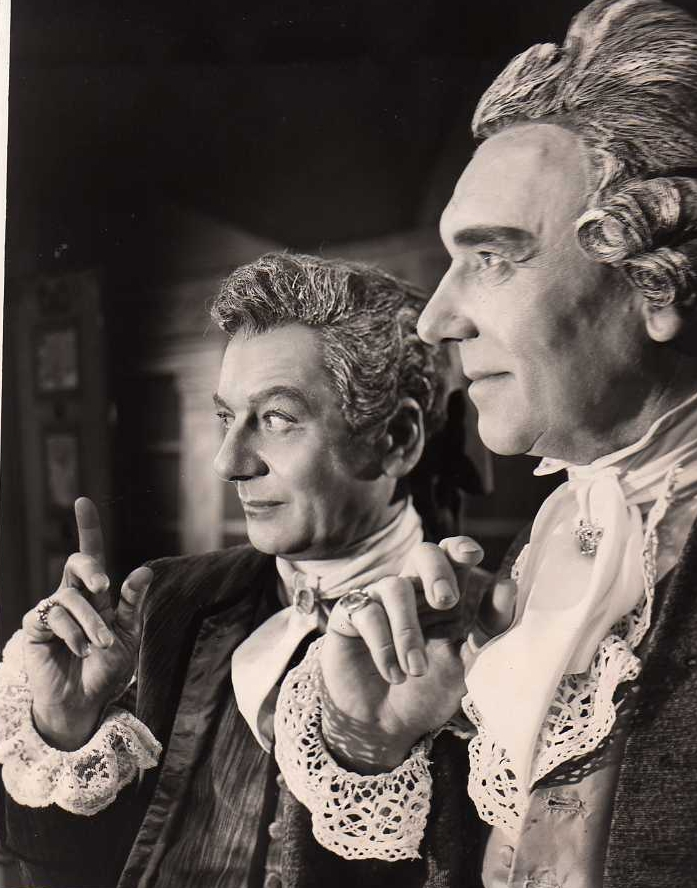
John Gielgud (left) as Joseph Surface, and Richardson as Sir Peter Teazle, The School for Scandal, 1962

For his next four stage productions, Richardson was at the Haymarket. Father Carving a Statue (1964) by Graham Greene was short-lived. He had a more reliable vehicle in Shaw's You Never Can Tell (1966) in which he played the philosopher-waiter William, and in the same year he had a great success as Sir Anthony Absolute in The Rivals. The critic David Benedictus wrote of Richardson's performance, "he is choleric and gouty certainly, the script demands that he shall be, but his most engaging quality, his love for his son in spite of himself, shines through every line." In 1967 he again played Shylock; this was the last time he acted in a Shakespeare play on stage. His performance won critical praise, but the rest of the cast were less well received.

Interspersed with his stage plays, Richardson made thirteen cinema films during the decade. On screen he played historical figures including Sir Edward Carson (Oscar Wilde, 1960), W. E. Gladstone (Khartoum, 1966) and Sir Edward Grey (Oh! What a Lovely War, 1969). He was scrupulous about historical accuracy in his portrayals, and researched eras and characters in great detail before filming. Occasionally his precision was greater than directors wished, as when, in Khartoum, he insisted on wearing a small black finger-stall because the real Gladstone had worn one following an injury. After a role playing a disabled tycoon and Sean Connery's uncle in Woman of Straw, in 1965 he played Alexander Gromeko in Lean's Doctor Zhivago, an exceptionally successful film at the box office, which, together with The Wrong Box and Khartoum, earned him a BAFTA nomination for best leading actor in 1966. Other film roles from this period included Lord Fortnum (The Bed Sitting Room, 1969) and Leclerc (The Looking Glass War, 1970). The casts of Oh! What a Lovely War and Khartoum included Olivier, but he and Richardson did not appear in the same scenes, and never met during the filming. Olivier was by now running the National Theatre, temporarily based at the Old Vic, but showed little desire to recruit his former colleague for any of the company's productions. (Note: Accounts vary about how hard Olivier tried to get Richardson to join the National company. Olivier's successor, Peter Hall, believed that the reluctance was more on Richardson's side than Olivier's, and that Olivier was upset when Hall succeeded where he had failed in recruiting Richardson. John Miller comments that the roles Olivier had offered did not appeal to Richardson, so that the invitations were hardly more than token gestures.)

In 1964 Richardson was the voice of General Haig in the twenty-six-part BBC documentary series The Great War. In 1967 he played Lord Emsworth on BBC television in dramatisations of P G Wodehouse's Blandings Castle stories, with his wife playing Emsworth's bossy sister Constance, and Stanley Holloway as the butler, Beach. He was nervous about acting in a television series: "I'm sixty-four and that's a bit old to be taking on a new medium." The performances divided critical opinion. The Times thought the stars "a sheer delight ... situation comedy is joy in their hands". The reviewers in The Guardian and The Observer thought the three too theatrical to be effective on the small screen. For television he recorded studio versions of two plays in which he had appeared on stage: Johnson Over Jordan (1965) and Twelfth Night (1968).

During the decade, Richardson made numerous sound recordings. For the Caedmon Audio label he re-created his role as Cyrano de Bergerac opposite Anna Massey as Roxane, and played the title role in a complete recording of Julius Caesar, with a cast that included Anthony Quayle as Brutus, John Mills as Cassius and Alan Bates as Antony. Other Caedmon recordings were Measure for Measure, The School for Scandal and No Man's Land. Richardson also recorded some English Romantic poetry, including The Rime of the Ancient Mariner and poems by Keats and Shelley for the label. For Decca Records Richardson recorded the narration for Prokofiev's Peter and the Wolf, and for RCA the superscriptions for Vaughan Williams's Sinfonia antartica – both with the London Symphony Orchestra, the Prokofiev conducted by Sir Malcolm Sargent and the Vaughan Williams by André Previn.

Richardson's last stage role of the decade was in 1969, as Dr Rance in What the Butler Saw by Joe Orton. It was a conspicuous failure. The public hated the play and made the fact vociferously clear at the first night.

=== 1970–74 ===
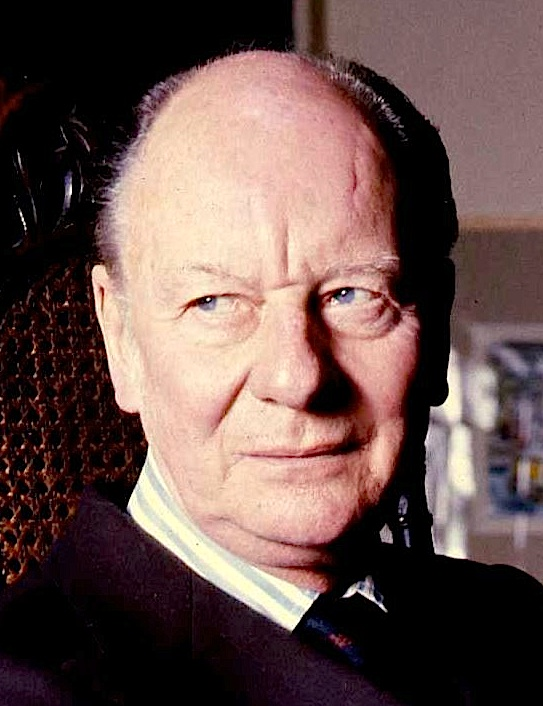
John Gielgud, long-time colleague and friend

In 1970 Richardson was with Gielgud at the Royal Court in David Storey's Home. The play is set in the gardens of a nursing home for mental patients, though this is not clear at first. The two elderly men converse in a desultory way, are joined and briefly enlivened by two more extrovert female patients, are slightly scared by another male patient, and are then left together, conversing even more emptily. The Punch critic, Jeremy Kingston wrote:

At the end of the play, as the climax to two perfect, delicate performances, Sir Ralph and Sir John are standing, staring out above the heads of the audience, cheeks wet with tears in memory of some unnamed misery, weeping soundlessly as the lights fade on them. It makes a tragic, unforgettable close.

The play transferred to the West End and then to Broadway. In The New York Times Clive Barnes wrote, "The two men, bleakly examining the little nothingness of their lives, are John Gielgud and Ralph Richardson giving two of the greatest performances of two careers that have been among the glories of the English-speaking theater." The original cast recorded the play for television in 1972.

Back at the Royal Court in 1971 Richardson starred in John Osborne's West of Suez, after which, in July 1972, he surprised many by joining Peggy Ashcroft in a drawing-room comedy, Lloyd George Knew My Father by William Douglas-Home. Some critics felt the play was too slight for its two stars, but Harold Hobson thought Richardson found unsuspected depths in the character of the ostensibly phlegmatic General Boothroyd. The play was a hit with the public, and when Ashcroft left after four months, Celia Johnson took over until May 1973, when Richardson handed over to Andrew Cruickshank in the West End. Richardson afterwards toured the play in Australia and Canada with his wife as co-star. An Australian critic wrote, "The play is a vehicle for Sir Ralph ... but the real driver is Lady Richardson."

Richardson's film roles of the early 1970s ranged from the bogus medium Mr Benton in Whoever Slew Auntie Roo? (1971), the Crypt Keeper in Tales from the Crypt (1972) and dual roles in Lindsay Anderson's O Lucky Man to the Caterpillar in Alice's Adventures in Wonderland (1972) and Dr Rank in Ibsen's A Doll's House (1973). The last of these was released at the same time as an American film of the same play, starring Jane Fonda; the timing detracted from the impact of both versions, but Richardson's performance won good reviews. In The Observer, George Melly wrote, "As for Sir Ralph as Dr Rank, he grows from the ageing elegant cynic of his first appearance (it's even a pleasure to watch him remove his top hat) to become the heroic dying stoic of his final exit without in any way forcing the pace." In 1973 Richardson received a BAFTA nomination for his performance of George IV in Lady Caroline Lamb, in which Olivier appeared as Wellington.

=== 1975–1983 ===
Peter Hall, having succeeded Olivier as director of the National Theatre, was determined to attract Ashcroft, Gielgud and Richardson into the company. In 1975 he successfully offered Richardson the title role in Ibsen's John Gabriel Borkman, with Ashcroft and Wendy Hiller in the two main female roles. The production was one of the early successes of Hall's initially difficult tenure. The critic Michael Billington wrote that Hall had done the impossible in reconciling the contradictory aspects of the play and that "Richardson's Borkman is both moral monster and self-made superman; and the performance is full of a strange, unearthly music that belongs to this actor alone."

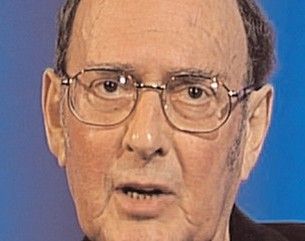
Harold Pinter, author of No Man's Land; he later played Hirst, the role created by Richardson

Richardson continued his long stage association with Gielgud in Harold Pinter's No Man's Land (1975) directed by Hall at the National. Gielgud played Spooner, a down-at-heel sponger and opportunist, and Richardson was Hirst, a prosperous but isolated and vulnerable author. There is both comedy and pain in the piece: the critic Michael Coveney called their performance "the funniest double-act in town", but Peter Hall said of Richardson, "I do not think any other actor could fill Hirst with such a sense of loneliness and creativity as Ralph does. The production was a critical and box-office success, and played at the Old Vic, in the West End, at the Lyttelton Theatre in the new National Theatre complex, on Broadway and on television, over a period of three years.

After No Man's Land, Richardson once again turned to light comedy by Douglas-Home, from whom he commissioned The Kingfisher. A story of an old love affair rekindled, it opened with Celia Johnson as the female lead. It ran for six months, and would have lasted much longer had Johnson not withdrawn, leaving Richardson unwilling to rehearse the piece with anyone else. He returned to the National, and to Chekhov, in 1978 as the aged retainer Firs in The Cherry Orchard. The notices for the production were mixed; those for Richardson's next West End play were uniformly dreadful. This was Alice's Boys, a spy and murder piece generally agreed to be preposterous. A legend, possibly apocryphal, grew that during the short run Richardson walked to the front of the stage one night and asked, "Is there a doctor in the house?" A doctor stood up, and Richardson sadly said to him, "Doctor, isn't this a terrible play?"

After this débâcle the rest of Richardson's stage career was at the National, with one late exception. He played Lord Touchwood in The Double Dealer (1978), the Master in The Fruits of Enlightenment (1979), Old Ekdal in The Wild Duck (1979) and Kitchen in Storey's Early Days, specially written for him. The last toured in North America after the London run. His final West End play was The Understanding (1982), a gentle comedy of late-flowering love. Celia Johnson was cast as his co-star, but died suddenly just before the first night. Joan Greenwood stepped into the breach, but the momentum of the production had gone, and it closed after eight weeks.

Films in which Richardson appeared in the later 1970s and early 1980s include Rollerball (1975), The Man in the Iron Mask (1977), Dragonslayer (1981) in which he played a wizard and Time Bandits (1981) in which he played the Supreme Being. In 1983 he was seen as Pfordten in Tony Palmer's Wagner; this was a film of enormous length, (Note: Palmer's film has been seen in versions of several lengths. The original version lasted for nine hours. A three-and-a-half-hour edition was shown in Los Angeles in December 1983 to qualify it for consideration in the 1984 Academy Awards. The longer version was issued on DVD in 2007. Another version lasting seven hours and three quarters was issued on DVD in 2011.) starring Richard Burton as Richard Wagner and was noted at the time, and subsequently, for the cameo roles of three conspiratorial courtiers, played by Gielgud, Olivier and Richardson – the only film in which the three played scenes together. (Note: The three are seen together in long shot near the opening of Olivier's film of Richard III with no shared dialogue.) For television, Richardson played Simeon in Jesus of Nazareth (1977), made studio recordings of No Man's Land (1978) and Early Days (1982), and was a guest in the 1981 Morecambe and Wise Christmas Show. (Note: Eric Morecambe was a great admirer of Richardson, and went to see him in Lloyd George Knew My Father twelve times. Richardson played in a (deliberately) semi-literate historical sketch supposedly written by Ernie Wise. The Guardian commented, "Nothing in it could quite compare with Sir Ralph Richardson's reading for Eric's Disraeli. It takes a real superstar to do justice to the lines: 'Nobody had served the country with such patriotic fervour like what I did.'") His last radio broadcast was in 1982 in a documentary programme about Little Tich, whom he had watched at the Brighton Hippodrome before the First World War.

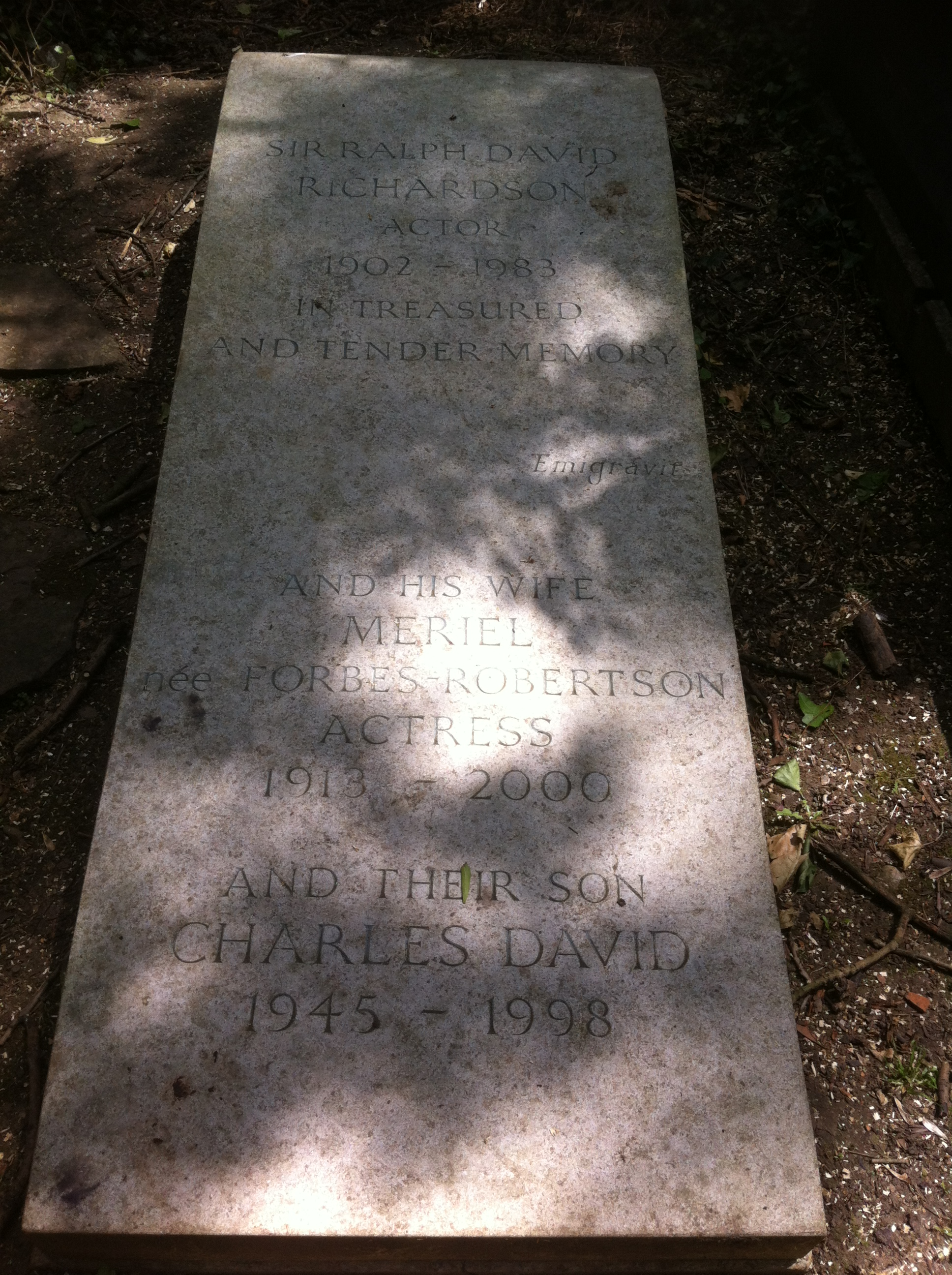
The grave of Richardson, his wife Meriel Forbes, and their son, Charles, in Highgate Cemetery in north London

In Witness for the Prosecution, a television remake of the 1957 film, he played the barrister Sir Wilfrid Robarts, co-starring Deborah Kerr and Diana Rigg. In the United States, it was shown on the CBS network in December 1982. Richardson's last two films were released after his death: Give My Regards to Broad Street, with Paul McCartney, and Greystoke, a retelling of the Tarzan story. In the last, Richardson played the stern old Lord Greystoke, rejuvenated in his latter days by his lost grandson, reclaimed from the wild; he was posthumously nominated for an Academy Award. The film bears the superscription, "Dedicated to Ralph Richardson 1902–1983 – In Loving Memory"

Richardson's final stage role was Don Alberto in Inner Voices by Eduardo De Filippo at the National in 1983. The direction was criticised by reviewers, but Richardson's performance won high praise. He played an old man who denounces the next-door family for murder and then realises he dreamt it but cannot persuade the police that he was wrong. Both Punch and The New York Times found his performance "mesmerising". After the London run the piece was scheduled to go on tour in October. Just before that, Richardson suffered a series of strokes, from which he died on 10 October, at the age of 80. All the theatres in London dimmed their lights in tribute; the funeral Mass was at Richardson's favourite church, the Church of Our Lady of the Assumption and St Gregory, in Soho; (Note: By special permission of the area bishop, the Mass was sung in the old form of the Roman Missal with which Richardson had grown up. In 1971 he had been one of many public figures who appealed to the Roman Catholic church not to abandon this traditional form of the Mass.) he was buried in Highgate Cemetery; and the following month there was a memorial service in Westminster Abbey.

== Character and reputation ==
As a man, Richardson was on the one hand deeply private and on the other flamboyantly unconventional. Frank Muir said of him, "It's the Ralphdom of Ralph that one has to cling to; he wasn't really quite like other people." In Coveney's phrase, "His oddness was ever startling and never hardened into mere eccentricity." Richardson would introduce colleagues to his ferrets by name, ride at high speed on his powerful motor-bike in his seventies, have a parrot flying round his study eating his pencils, or take a pet mouse out for a stroll, but behind such unorthodox behaviour there was a closely guarded self who remained an enigma to even his closest colleagues. Tynan wrote in The New Yorker that Richardson "made me feel that I have known this man all my life and that I have never met anyone who more adroitly buttonholed me while keeping me firmly at arm's length."

Richardson was not known for his political views. He reportedly voted for Winston Churchill's Conservative party in 1945, but there is little other mention of party politics in the biographies. Having been a devoted Roman Catholic as a boy, he became disillusioned with religion as a young man, but drifted back to faith: "I came to a kind of feeling I could touch a live wire through prayer". He retained his early love of painting, and listed it and tennis in his Who's Who entry as his recreations.

Peter Hall said of Richardson, "I think he was the greatest actor I have ever worked with." The director David Ayliff, son of Richardson's and Olivier's mentor, said, "Ralph was a natural actor, he couldn't stop being a perfect actor; Olivier did it through sheer hard work and determination." Comparing the two, Hobson said that Olivier always made the audience feel inferior, and Richardson always made them feel superior. The actor Edward Hardwicke agreed, saying that audiences were in awe of Olivier, "whereas Ralph would always make you feel sympathy ... you wanted to give him a big hug. But they were both giants."

Richardson thought himself temperamentally unsuited to the great tragic roles, and most reviewers agreed, but to critics of several generations he was peerless in classic comedies. Kenneth Tynan judged any Falstaff against Richardson's, which he considered "matchless", and Gielgud judged "definitive". Richardson, though hardly ever satisfied with his own performances, evidently believed he had done well as Falstaff. Hall and others tried hard to get him to play the part again, but referring to it he said, "Those things I've done in which I've succeeded a little bit, I'd hate to do again."

It's very hard to define what was so special about him, because of this ethereal, other-worldly, strangely subversive quality. He was foursquare, earthy on the stage, a little taller than average height, yeasty. "As for my face," he once said, "I've seen better looking hot cross buns." But he seemed possessed of special knowledge.

— Michael Coveney

A leading actor of a younger generation, Albert Finney, has said that Richardson was not really an actor at all, but a magician. Miller, who interviewed many of Richardson's colleagues for his 1995 biography, notes that when talking about Richardson's acting, "magical" was a word many of them used. The Guardian judged Richardson "indisputably our most poetic actor". For The Times, he "was ideally equipped to make an ordinary character seem extraordinary or an extraordinary one seem ordinary". He himself touched on this dichotomy in his variously reported comments that acting was "merely the art of keeping a large group of people from coughing" or, alternatively, "dreaming to order".

Tynan, who could be brutally critical when he thought Richardson miscast, nevertheless thought there was something godlike about him, "should you imagine the Almighty to be a whimsical, enigmatic magician, capable of fearful blunders, sometimes inexplicably ferocious, at other times dazzling in his innocence and benignity". Harold Hobson wrote, "Sir Ralph is an actor who, whatever his failure in heroic parts, however short of tragic grandeur his Othello or his Macbeth may have fallen, has nevertheless, in unromantic tweeds and provincial hats, received a revelation. There are more graceful players than he upon the stage; there is none who has been so touched by Grace."

== Notes, references and sources ==
=== Sources ===
- Agate, James (1934). First Nights. London: Nicholson and Watson. OCLC 1854236.
- Agate, James (1946). The Contemporary Theatre, 1944 and 1945. London: Harrap. OCLC 1597751.
- Billington, Michael (2002). One Night Stands – A Critic's View of Modern British Theatre. London: Nick Hern. ISBN 1854596608.
- Billington, Michael (2007). Harold Pinter. London: Faber and Faber. ISBN 0571234763.
- Clough, Valerie (1989). Sir Ralph Richardson – A Life in the Theatre. Worthing, UK: Churchman. ISBN 1850931143.
- Croall, Jonathan (2011). John Gielgud – Matinee Idol to Movie Star. London: Methuen. ISBN 1408131064.
- Findlater, Richard (1983). These our Actors – A Celebration of the Theatre Acting of Peggy Ashcroft, John Gielgud, Laurence Olivier, Ralph Richardson. London: Elm Tree Books. ISBN 0241111358.
- Gaye, Freda, ed. (1967). Who's Who in the Theatre (fourteenth ed.). London: Sir Isaac Pitman and Sons. OCLC 5997224.
- Gielgud, John (1979). An Actor and His Time. London: Sidgwick and Jackson. ISBN 0283985739.
- Gielgud, John (2000). Gielgud on Gielgud. London: Hodder and Stoughton. ISBN 0340795026.
- Gielgud, John (2004). Richard Mangan (ed.). Gielgud's Letters. London: Weidenfeld and Nicolson. ISBN 0297829890.
- Hall, Peter (2000) [1983]. John Goodwin (ed.). Peter Hall's Diaries. London: Oberon. ISBN 1840021020.
- Hayman, Ronald (1971). Gielgud. London: Heinemann. ISBN 0435184008.
- Hobson, Harold (1958). Ralph Richardson. London: Rockliff. OCLC 3797774.
- Holden, Anthony (1988). Laurence Olivier. London: Weidenfeld and Nicolson. ISBN 0020332858.
- Kulik, Karol (1975). Alexander Korda – The Man Who Could Work Miracles. London: W H Allen. ISBN 0491019432.
- Miller, John (1995). Ralph Richardson – The Authorized Biography. London: Sidgwick and Jackson. ISBN 0283062371.
- Morley, Sheridan (1985). "Ralph Richardson". The Great Stage Stars. London, and North Ryde, Australia: Angus & Robertson. ISBN 0207149704.
- Neill, Michael (2006). "Introduction". Othello, the Moor of Venice. The Oxford Shakespeare. Oxford and New York: Oxford University Press. ISBN 0191568473.
- O'Connor, Garry (1982). Ralph Richardson – An Actor's Life. London: Hodder and Stoughton. ISBN 0340270411.
- Sinyard, Neil (2013). A Wonderful Heart – The Films of William Wyler. Jefferson, North Carolina: McFarland. ISBN 0786435739.
- Tanitch, Robert (1982). Ralph Richardson. London: Evans. ISBN 023745680X.
- Tynan, Kenneth (1964). Tynan on Theatre. London: Penguin Books. OCLC 949598.

== See also ==
- List of British actors
- List of Academy Award winners and nominees from Great Britain
- List of posthumous Academy Award winners and nominees
- List of actors with more than one Academy Award nomination in the acting categories
- Lists of knights bachelor
- List of oldest and youngest Academy Award winners and nominees – Oldest nominees for Best Actor in a Supporting Role
