= Home at Seven (film) =

- Directed by: Ralph Richardson
- Written by: Anatole de Grunwald
- Based on: Home at Seven by R.C. Sherriff
- Produced by: Maurice Cowan
- Starring: Ralph Richardson; Margaret Leighton; Jack Hawkins
- Cinematography: Jack Hildyard; Edward Scaife
- Edited by: Bert Bates
- Music by: Malcolm Arnold
- Production company: London Films
- Distributed by: British Lion Films
- Release date: 17 March 1952
- Running time: 85 minutes
- Country: United Kingdom
- Language: English
- Box office: £94,335 (UK)

Home at Seven (alternatively titled Murder On Monday) is a 1952 British mystery drama film directed by and starring Ralph Richardson, featuring Margaret Leighton, Jack Hawkins, Campbell Singer and Michael Shepley. It was written by Anatole de Grunwald based on the 1950 play Home at Seven by R. C. Sherriff. The film is Richardson's only work as director. Guy Hamilton was assistant director.

== Plot ==
Preston, a City of London banker, returns at 7pm to his suburban home in Kent one Tuesday evening to discover that he has been missing for 24 hours, yet he does not remember the lost day. He discovers that he was seen at the social club which he is the treasurer of on Monday evening taking £515 from the safe. The man who saw this, Robinson, is found murdered in an allotment the evening he comes home.

When questioned by the police he lies that he spent the night across London with friends. However he later discovers the friend he nominated is away on holiday.

He goes to his doctor and tells him he has started to remember things. He describes where Robinson was found and how he was being followed by him. He says he buried the money then followed Robinson. He tells the doctor of his lie about where he was Monday night.

His doctor takes him to see his solicitor who advises him to employ an expensive counsel to defend himself. The solicitor also advises him to tell the police the correct story. He becomes the major suspect in the robbery and murder, but he does not know if he was involved or not.

The police take him to the police station for a statement after collecting the clothes and shoes he wore on Monday. Preston's wife reveals to the lawyer that her husband has been short of money due to his father embezzling money from his work, which Preston has vowed to repay.

He tells the police that he cannot remember anything from 6pm Monday till 7pm Tuesday. The president of the club tells the doctor that Preston has been borrowing money all around the club.

It is ultimately revealed by a barmaid that he regularly spends from 5pm till 6pm each evening in her pub. He did this on Monday evening but started acting oddly following a loud bang outside, which seemed to trigger a war time memory. He seemed to think the war is back on. He then is placed in a room in the hotel and he goes to sleep. He sleeps there all night and in the morning still seems to think the war is on. He stayed in the room all day. They take him down to the bar at 5pm and he comes out of the trance, says he is going home, and leaves. She tells the police and they advise Preston they have discovered Robinson and another man did the robbery and this other man murdered Robinson.

== Cast ==
- Ralph Richardson as David Preston
- Margaret Leighton as Janet Preston
- Jack Hawkins as Dr Sparling
- Campbell Singer as Inspector Hemingway
- Michael Shepley as Major Watson
- Margaret Withers as Mrs Watson
- Meriel Forbes as Peggy Dobson
- Frederick Piper as Petherbridge
- Gerald Case as Sergeant Evans
- Diana Beaumont as Ellen
- Archie Duncan as station sergeant
- Victor Hagan as police photographer
- Robert Moore as fingerprint man
- Johnnie Schofield as Joe Dobson, landlord of the Feathers

== Production ==
Sidney Gilliat claims Alexander Korda directed the film. He called Home at Seven "a very bad play which Alex made a very bad picture out of; but he skilfully gave the directing credit to Ralph Richardson.

It was shot at Shepperton Studios with sets designed by the art directors Vincent Korda and Frederick Pusey.

== Critical reception ==
Variety stated that "Richardson directs the piece with a straightforward competence."

Sight & Sound was more critical: Richardson had "divided his talent between the principal role and the direction, but the latter is practically non-existent in any cinema sense".

Leslie Halliwell said: "Intriguing suburban mystery, well acted but all too flatly transferred from the stage, and with a weak solution."

In British Sound Films: The Studio Years 1928–1959 David Quinlan rated the film as "average", writing: "Made for a pittance in 15 days, this fairly interesting drama was Richardson's only film a director"

The Radio Times Guide to Films gave the film 3/5 stars, writing: "This was Ralph Richardson's sole venture as a film director, and a pretty fair job he makes of it, too. He also re-creates his stage role as the timid bank clerk whose dose of amnesia coincides with a murder and a robbery. The strength of the picture is that you're never quite sure whether he's bluffing or baffled, and the secret is tightly kept right to the end. It's more than a mite stagey, though, with wife Margaret Leighton and doctor Jack Hawkins particularly guilty of overseasoning the ham."

== Releases ==
It was released on DVD in the UK on 30 June 2014 by Network Distributing.
