= A Day by the Sea =

1953 play by N. C. Hunter

Sybil Thorndike, Frederick Piper and John Gielgud in the original 1953 production

A Day by the Sea is a 1953 play by the British writer N. C. Hunter, first produced in 1953.

== First productions ==
After premiering at the Royal Court Theatre, Liverpool on 26 October 1953 the play toured to Manchester, Glasgow and Edinburgh before opening at the Haymarket Theatre in the West End of London, where it ran for 386 performances from 26 November 1953 to 30 October 1954. John Gielgud directed the production.

The play had its American premiere in Los Angeles on 17 August 1955, before the production was taken to San Francisco and then to Broadway. On 26 September 1955 it opened in New York at the ANTA Theatre, running for 24 performances. The director was Cedric Hardwicke.

== Original casts ==
	Original cast, Liverpool and London	Replacements during London run	Broadway cast
David Anson	Lewis Casson	Harcourt Williams	Halliwell Hobbes
Toby Eddison	Peter Murphy	Colin Gibson	Barclay Hodges
Dr Farley	Ralph Richardson	Brewster Mason	Dennis King
Julian Anson	John Gielgud		Hume Cronyn
William Gregson	Frederick Piper		John W. Austin
Humphrey Caldwell	Lockwood West		Leo Britt
Elinor Eddison	Patricia Laurence	Margaret McCourt	Veronica Cole
Miss Mathieson	Megs Jenkins		Megs Jenkins
Laura Anson	Sybil Thorndike	Mary Jerrold	Aline MacMahon
Frances Falter	Irene Worth		Jessica Tandy

Source: Wearing and IBDB.

== Plot ==
There is little incident in the play, which is a study of the various characters rather than a narrative. It is set in and near the Dorset country house of Laura Anson, a brisk and sensible elderly woman, determined to keep the family home going, though worried that once she is dead nobody will succeed her in this. Her son, Julian, is a workaholic diplomat who abruptly realises that his obsession with his work has left him without a personal life. He attempts to interest the widowed, emotionally damaged Frances, but after two disastrous marriages she cannot face another deep personal relationship. David Anson, Julian's uncle, is an octogenarian who muses on the transitory nature of life. The governess, Miss Mathieson, despairs of finding a husband and makes an unsuccessful attempt to engage the affections of the bibulous but shrewd Dr Farley. While the characters are having a picnic on the beach a Foreign Office official comes to tell Julian he is no longer required in the embassy in Paris and must return to London.

== Critical reception ==
The play divided the critics. There was general agreement that the piece was reminiscent of the plays of Chekhov, but some found it static and lacking Chekhovian depth. Ivor Brown in The Observer called it "second rate ... a competent pastiche of Russian fin de siècle theatre", albeit "very handsomely" done. Others found it thoughtful and touching. The Times called it "essentially a poetic theme – treated gently, stylishly, prosaically". The Spectator said, "Frustration and nostalgia are the predominant themes of the play, given fine acting, direction, and production". The critic J. C. Trewin called it "a curiously undramatic, derivative piece ... but its lingering tenderness can find the heart." The reviewer in The Sphere said, "Mr Hunter skilfully depicts a household more than usually stocked with unfulfilled lives".

== Revival ==
The play was revived in London at the Finborough Theatre in 2008, directed by Tom Cooper, with a cast including Juliet Ackroyd, Lucy Russell, Romy Tennant and Stephen Omer. It was revived again at the Southwark Playhouse in 2017, with John Sackville in the leading role of Julian.

== Adaptations ==
A Day by the Sea has twice been adapted for British television. In 1959 Associated Television broadcast a production with John Gielgud (in his first television role) and Megs Jenkins reprising their stage parts, and Gladys Cooper (Laura), Nicholas Hannen (David), Roger Livesey (Dr Farley) and Margaret Leighton (Frances) as co-stars. The second adaptation, by the BBC (1964) starred Gwen Ffrangcon-Davies (Laura), Robert Flemyng (Julian), Rachel Gurney (Frances), Felix Aylmer (David), and Gene Anderson (Miss Mathieson).

The BBC broadcast radio adaptations of the play in 1955 and 1991. The first, produced by Val Gielgud, featured Robert Eddison (Julian), Gladys Young (Laura), Gwen Cherrell (Frances), John Turnbull (David), Belle Chrystall (Miss Mathieson) and Brewster Mason (Dr Farley). The second starred Wendy Hiller (Laura), Richard Pasco (Julian), Alan Wheatley (David), Michael Hordern (Dr Farley) and Barbara Leigh Hunt (Frances).

== Sources ==
- Wearing, J. P. (2014). The London Stage 1950–1959: A Calendar of Productions, Performers, and Personnel. Lanham: Rowman & Littlefield. ISBN 978-1-322-15916-4.
