= Home (Storey play) =

1970 play by David Storey

- First edition (publ. Jonathan Cape)
- Written by: David Storey
- Characters: Harry; Jack; Marjorie; Kathleen; Alfred
- Setting: A mental asylum

Premiere
- Date: 17 June 1970
- Place: Royal Court Theatre, London

Home is a play by David Storey. It is set in a mental asylum, although this fact is only revealed gradually as the story progresses. The four primary characters are seemingly benign Harry, highly opinionated Jack, cynical Marjorie, and flirtatious Kathleen. As they interact we come to realize their delusions and pretensions are similar to those of people living in a supposedly normal society.

== Productions ==
The play premiered at the Royal Court Theatre in London on 17 June 1970, directed by Lindsay Anderson. It transferred to the Apollo Theatre, where it ran for three months, then to Broadway, opening on 17 November 1970 at the Morosco Theatre, where it ran for 110 performances. The London and Broadway casts both included Sir John Gielgud as Harry, Sir Ralph Richardson as Jack, Dandy Nichols as Marjorie and Mona Washbourne as Kathleen. Jessica Tandy replaced Nichols later in the Broadway run. Storey adapted his play for the 6 January 1972 broadcast of the British television series Play for Today. It was directed by Anderson and featured the same cast.

It was revived off-Broadway by the Actors Company Theatre (TACT) in 2006, starring British actor Simon Jones and American actress Cynthia Harris.

More recently it was part of the Peter Hall Company season in 2009 at the Theatre Royal, Bath, and the Soulpepper Theatre season in 2012 in Toronto, Ontario.

== Accolades ==
=== Wins ===
- Drama Desk Award for Outstanding Performance (Ralph Richardson and John Gielgud, co-winners)
- New York Drama Critics' Circle Award for Best Play

=== Nominations ===
- Tony Award for Best Play
- Tony Award for Best Performance by a Leading Actor in a Play (Richardson and Gielgud)
- Tony Award for Best Performance by a Featured Actress in a Play (Mona Washbourne)
- Tony Award for Best Direction of a Play (Lindsay Anderson)
