= Home at Seven (play) =

1950 play by R. C. Sherriff

- Written by: R. C. Sherriff
- Original language: English
- Genre: Mystery

Premiere
- Date premiered: 6 February 1950
- Place premiered: Theatre Royal, Brighton

Home at Seven is a 1950 British mystery play by R. C. Sherriff. The original production, starring Ralph Richardson, opened at the Theatre Royal, Brighton in February 1950. It transferred to Wyndham's Theatre in the West End on 7 March 1950, for a run of 342 performances. Variety called it "one of the major successes of the legit season."

== Plot ==
David Preston returns home from work to his wife Janet to find that 24 hours have elapsed without him even realising it, and it is now a day later than he thought. As hard as he tries, he cannot recall the missing day. Evidence then emerges suggesting that he was involved in a theft and murder that happened in the period that he cannot account for.

== Original cast ==
- David Preston - Ralph Richardson
- Dr. Sparling - Cyril Raymond
- Major Watson - Philip Stainton
- Inspector Hemingway - Campbell Singer
- Mr. Petherbridge - Frederick Piper
- Mrs. Preston - Marian Spencer
- Peggy Dobson - Meriel Forbes

== Adaptations ==
In 1952 the play was adapted as a film Home at Seven directed by and starring Ralph Richardson, with many of the stage cast reprising their roles.
