= The White Carnation =

1963 play by R. C. Sherriff

- Original language: English
- Written by: R.C. Sheriff
- Genre: Drama

Premiere
- Date: 5 January 1953
- Place: Theatre Royal, Brighton

The White Carnation is a 1953 play by English playwright R. C. Sherriff. Its premiere production had a cast led by Ralph Richardson, but it was not revived until a 2013 Finborough Theatre production featuring Aden Gillett and Benjamin Whitrow.

In 2014, the play was performed at the Jermyn Street Theatre

== Plot ==
John Greenwood says goodbye to the guests from his and his wife's Christmas Eve, but a gust of wind shuts the front door and leaves him locked out of his own house. He breaks a window to gain entry and finds the house ruined and deserted. A policeman questions him what he is doing in the house, all of whose inhabitants were killed by a V-1 flying bomb during a Christmas Eve party in 1944, but Greenwood indignantly insists that he is in his own house. A coroner and doctor are summoned and inform Greenwood that he was one of the inhabitants killed and that he has returned to the house as a ghost - and that is now 1951.

Greenwood is visited by Lydia Truscott, niece of the town clerk, who agrees to help him in his attempts at self-education and returning to the spirit-world. He also meets with a welcome from the local vicar Mr. Pendlebury and his next door neighbour Mrs. Carter, but also has to deal with the coroner and the Home Office, who are determined to move Greenwood out, knock the house down and build new flats on the site.

As the house's demolition begins, Greenwood finally vanishes and in a final scene re-runs his last Christmas Eve party, reconciling with his wife, whom during his haunting he had realised that he had emotionally ill-treated during his lifetime.

== Critical reaction ==
Writing in The Sunday Times, the critic Harold Hobson called the original production of the play "extremely and touchingly human". Of the revival Dominic Cavendish writing in the Telegraph observed, "what a neglected little treasure it proves: not life-changing, maybe, but life-affirming". However, writing in The Guardian, Michael Billington called the play "passably entertaining, but much of its feels like quilted padding."

== Adaptations ==
The White Carnation
- Advertisement from The Age 1 May 1963
- Directed by: Christopher Muir
- Country of origin: Australia
- Original language: English

Production
- Running time: 60 mins
- Production company: Australian Broadcasting Commission

Original release
- Release: 1 May 1963 (Melbourne, live)
- Release: 29 May 1963

=== Australian TV version ===
The play was adapted for Australian TV in 1963 directed by Christopher Muir. Australian TV drama was relatively rare at the time. The play starred Michael Duffield as John Greenwood, and featured Stewart Weller, Neville Thurgood, Roly Barlee, Barbara Brandon, Margaret Cruikshank, Brian Gilmar, Edward Hepple, Jane Oehr as Lydia, Alwyn Owen, Hugh Stewart, Leslie Wright and Felicity Young. The set was designed by Kevin Bartlett. Chris Muir stated while filming it the set caught fire. They kept filming it while the studio hands put out the fire with extinguishers before the sprinklers went on.

=== BBC Radio version ===
The BBC World Service broadcast an audio adaptation by Penny Leicester in December 1990, starring Philip Voss as John Greenwood. The recording has been repeated on BBC Radio 4 Extra.

== See also ==
- List of television plays broadcast on Australian Broadcasting Corporation (1960s)
