= Lloyd George Knew My Father (play) =

Play written by William Douglas-Home

Lloyd George Knew My Father is a 1972 play by the British playwright William Douglas-Home. The black comedy features an elderly and eccentric aristocratic couple who learn that a bypass is to be built through their property. The wife declares her intention to commit suicide in protest, and the complications arising from this set up the rest of the play's action.

The play has had various revivals and has continued to be staged into the 21st century. The Devonshire Park Theatre staged the play in 1974. Wendy Toye directed the play in 1995 at the Watermill Theatre, which was topical because of the nearby construction of the Newbury bypass. A production was mounted by the Salisbury Studio Theatre. The King's Theatre in Edinburgh mounted a production in 2009.

A version was shown on British television in 1975.

== Plot ==
It's breakfast time on Saturday morning at Boothroyd Hall and Lady Sheila Boothroyd is outraged to read in her newspaper that on Monday, bulldozers will start work on a new motorway running right through the grounds of their ancestral home. She tells her husband, General Sir William Boothroyd, that she will take drastic action: unless the scheme is halted she will commit suicide on Monday morning as a protest.

None of her family take Lady Sheila's threat seriously, even when she tells them she's written her own epitaph and ordered her headstone and coffin. But a young, ambitious journalist, who is a weekend guest, makes the Sunday newspaper headlines with the dramatic story and a photograph of Lady Sheila standing by the grave hastily dug for her by the crusty and loyal old butler Robertson.

Boothroyd Hall is immediately besieged by the world's press and TV reporters begging for interviews with Lady Sheila. The Prime Minister is prevailed upon to act, but refuses to cancel the project. Lady Sheila however is equally determined to halt the bulldozers.

== Original cast ==
- General Sir William Boothroyd – Ralph Richardson
- Hubert Boothroyd MP – James Grout
- Lady Boothroyd – Peggy Ashcroft
- Maud Boothroyd – Janet Henfrey
- Rev Trevor Simmonds – David Stoll
- Robertson – Allan Barnes
- Sally Boothroyd – Suzan Farmer
- Simon Green – Simon Cadell
