= R. C. Sherriff =

English playwright and novelist (1896–1975)

- Born: Robert Cedric Sherriff; 6 June 1896; Hampton Wick, Middlesex, England
- Died: 13 November 1975 (aged 79); Kingston upon Thames, England
- Occupations: Playwright and screenwriter
- Writing career
- Period: 1920s to 1960s

Robert Cedric Sherriff, FSA, FRSL (6 June 1896 – 13 November 1975) was an English writer best known for his play Journey's End, which was based on his experiences as an army officer in the First World War. He wrote several plays, many novels, and multiple screenplays, and was nominated for an Academy Award and two BAFTA awards.

== Early life ==
Sherriff was born in Hampton Wick, Middlesex, to insurance clerk Herbert Hankin Sherriff and Constance Winder. He was educated at Kingston Grammar School in Kingston upon Thames from 1905 to 1913. (Note: Sherriff maintained close links with the school for the rest of his life. He sent a copy of Journey's End to the headmaster after the play was first performed in 1928, and was a generous benefactor to the school until his death, paying particularly close attention to the school rowing club, whose supporters' club now bears his name. He financed a number of boats named after his plays (Journey's End, White Carnation, Home at Seven, Long Sunset and Badger's Green). He also purchased a piece of land at the end of Aragon Avenue in Thames Ditton for the purpose of building a school boathouse, which was completed in 1980.) After he left school, Sherriff began working at an insurance office as a clerk in 1914.

== Military service ==
Sherriff served as an officer in the 9th battalion of the East Surrey Regiment in the First World War, taking part in the fighting at Vimy Ridge and Loos. He was severely wounded at Passchendaele near Ypres in 1917.

== Post-war period ==
After recovering from his wounds, Sherriff worked as an insurance adjuster from 1918 to 1928 at Sun Insurance Company, London.

Sherriff read history at New College, Oxford, from 1931 to 1934. He was a fellow of the Royal Society of Literature and the Society of Antiquaries of London.

== Career ==
=== Playwright ===
Sherriff wrote his first play to help Kingston Rowing Club raise money to buy a new boat. Sherriff started writing his seventh play, Journey's End, probably his most famous, during the summer of 1927 in one of the railway carriage bungalows at Selsey. It was published in 1929 and was based on his experiences in the war. It was given a single Sunday performance, on 9 December 1928, by the Incorporated Stage Society at the Apollo Theatre, directed by James Whale and with the 21-year-old Laurence Olivier in the lead role. In the audience was Maurice Browne who produced it at the Savoy Theatre where it was performed for two years from 1929. The play was hugely successful and there was wide press coverage which reveals how audience responses provoked by this play shaped understanding of the First World War in the interwar years.

=== Novelist ===
A novelised version of Journey's End, co-written with Vernon Bartlett, was published in 1930.

The Fortnight in September, Sherriff's first true novel of 1931, describes a Bognor holiday enjoyed by a lower-middle-class family from Dulwich. It was nominated by Kazuo Ishiguro as a book to 'inspire, uplift and offer escape' in a 2020 list compiled by The Guardian during the COVID-19 pandemic. He described it as "just about the most uplifting, life-affirming novel I can think of right now".

Sherriff's 1936 novel Greengates is a realistic novel about a middle-aged couple, Tom and Edith Baldwin, moving from an established London suburb into the new suburbs of Metro-land.

His 1939 novel, The Hopkins Manuscript is an H. G. Wells-influenced post-apocalyptic story about an earth devastated after a collision with the Moon. Its sober language and realistic depiction of an average man coming to terms with a ruined England is said to have been an influence on later science fiction authors such as John Wyndham and Brian Aldiss.

== Award nominations ==
Sherriff was nominated along with Eric Maschwitz and Claudine West for an Academy Award for Best Adapted Screenplay for Goodbye, Mr. Chips which was released in 1939. His 1955 screenplays, The Dam Busters and The Night My Number Came Up, were nominated for best British screenplay BAFTA awards.

== Work ==
=== Plays ===
- 1921: A Hitch in the Proceedings
- 1922: The Woods of Meadowside
- 1923: Profit and Loss
- 1924: Cornlow-in-the-Downs
- 1925: The Feudal System
- 1926: Mr. Bridie's Finger
- 1928: Journey's End
- 1930: Badger's Green
- 1933: Windfall
- 1934: Two Hearts Doubled
- 1936: St Helena
- 1948: Miss Mabel
- 1950: Home at Seven
- 1953: The White Carnation
- 1955: The Long Sunset
- 1957: The Telescope
- 1960: A Shred of Evidence (or The Strip of Steel)

=== Film scripts ===
- 1933: The Invisible Man
- 1934: One More River
- 1937: The Road Back
- 1939: Goodbye, Mr. Chips
- 1939: The Four Feathers
- 1941: That Hamilton Woman
- 1942: This Above All
- 1942: Stand by for Action
- 1947: Odd Man Out
- 1948: Quartet
- 1950: Trio
- 1950: No Highway in the Sky
- 1955: The Dam Busters
- 1955: The Night My Number Came Up
- 1955: Cards with Uncle Tom (TV)
- 1963: The Ogburn Story (TV)

=== Novels ===
- 1930: Journey's End: A Novel (with Vernon Bartlett)
- 1931: The Fortnight in September
- 1936: Greengates
- 1939: The Hopkins Manuscript
- 1944: Chedworth: A Novel
- 1948: Another Year: A Novel

=== Other works ===
- 1954: King John's Treasure
- 1962: The Wells of St. Mary's
- 1973: The Siege of Swayne Castle
- 1968: No Leading Lady: An Autobiography

== See also ==
- List of Academy Award winners and nominees from Great Britain
