= Benedict Campbell =

Canadian actor (born 1957)

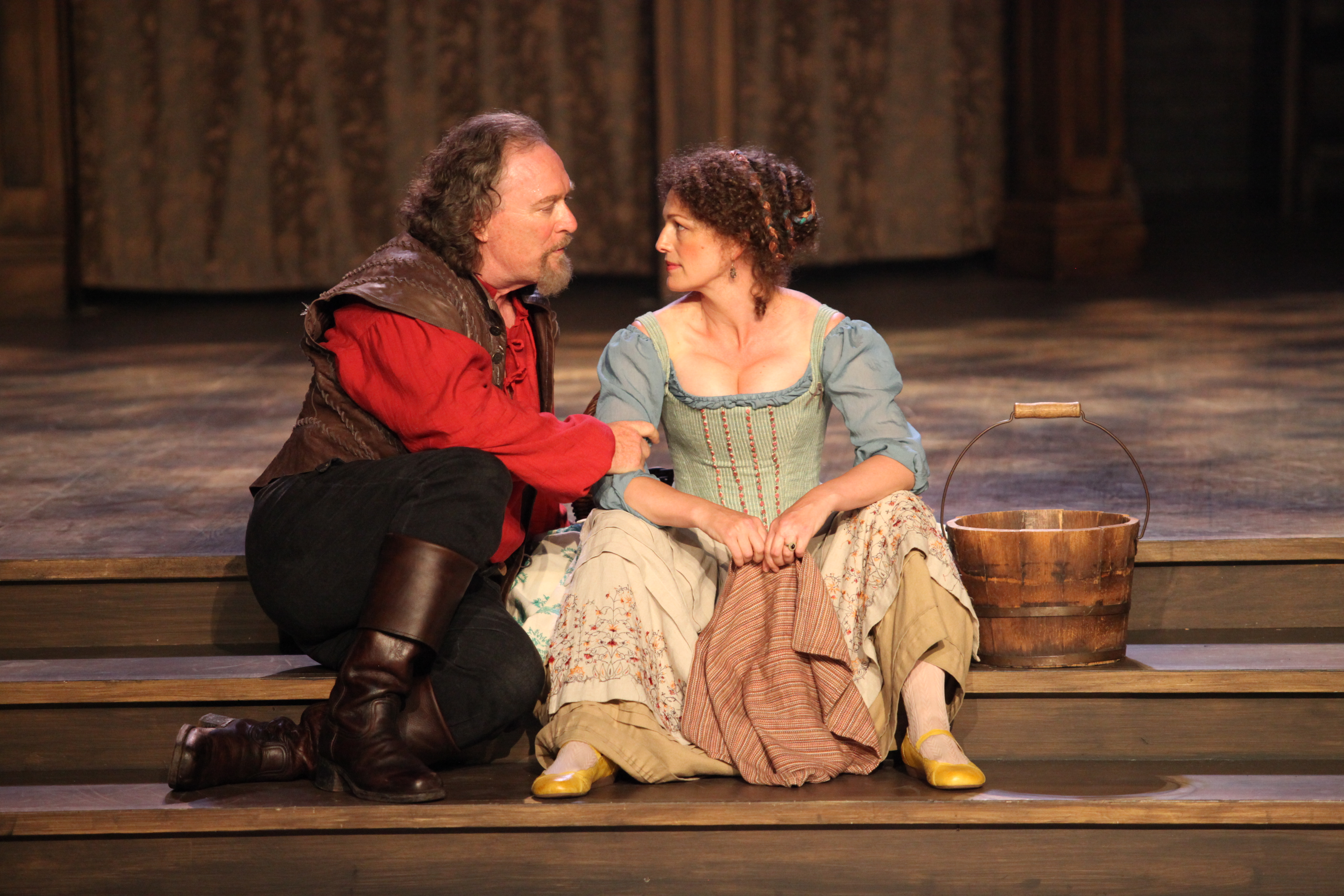
- Campbell (left) with Jennifer Lines performing on stage at 2015
- Born: June 12, 1957 (age 69); Montreal, Quebec, Canada
- Occupation: Actor
- Years active: 1985–present
- Spouse: Jackie Maxwell
- Children: 2, including Deragh Campbell
- Parent(s): Douglas Campbell; Ann Casson
- Relatives: Torquil Campbell (half brother); Lewis Casson (maternal grandfather); Sybil Thorndike (maternal grandmother); Christopher Casson (maternal uncle); Mary Casson (maternal aunt)

Benedict Campbell (born June 12, 1957) is a Canadian actor whose work has consisted primarily of providing voices for television cartoons, video games and acting on stage, particularly at Canada's Stratford Festival between 1965 and 2000. Early in his career, Campbell also appeared in a number of live action works.

== Family ==
Campbell comes from an acting family; his parents are Douglas Campbell and Ann Casson, and he is the brother of Dirk Campbell. Campbell's maternal grandparents are Sir Lewis Casson and Dame Sybil Thorndike.

While working in England, Campbell met Jackie Maxwell, who was working as an usher at Contact Theatre. The two later married and, when Campbell was offered work in Troilus and Cressida at the National Arts Centre, the two relocated to Canada. Their daughter is actress Deragh Campbell.

== Filmography ==
=== Live-action ===
- Act of Dishonour (2010) - Dave
- Republic of Doyle (2014) - Judge Richardson
- Slings and Arrows (2005) - Director #1
- The Sheldon Kennedy Story (1999) - Brandon Player #1
- A Holiday to Remember (1995) - Mr. Paul
- Zero Patience (1993)
- Street Legal (1992–1993) - Lorne Cassidy
- The Boys from Syracuse (1986) - Dromio of Syracuse

=== Animation ===
- DKC: Return to Krocodile Isle (2023) - King K. Rool/Klinger (voice)
- Ice Princess Lily (2018) - Arktos/Little Arktos (voice)
- Babar and the Adventures of Badou (2010–2011) - Additional voices
- Friends and Heroes (2007) - Samuel (voice)
- Jane and the Dragon (2006) - Sir Ivon Mackay, Chamberlain Milton Turnkey (voice)
- The Berenstain Bears (2002–2003) - Papa Q. Bear (voice)
- Redwall (1999) - Martin the Warrior / King Bull Sparra / Darkclaw (voice)
- Mythic Warriors: Guardians of the Legend (1998–2000) - Additional voices
- Noddy (1998) - Mr. Plod, Big Ears, Mr. Tubby Bear, Clockwork Clown, Bunky (voice)
- Freaky Stories (1997) - Narrator
- Donkey Kong Country (1997–2000) - King K. Rool (voice)
- Stickin' Around (1996) - Principal Coffin (voice)
- Ace Ventura: Pet Detective (1996) - Additional voices
- Monster Force (1994) - Additional voices
- Highlander: The Animated Series (1994–1995) - Don Vincente Marino Ramírez (voice)

=== Video games ===
- Resident Evil 3: Nemesis (1999) - Mikhail Victor

== Stratford Festival Theatre credits ==
- Hamlet (2000), Hamlet
- Julius Caesar (1998), Marcus Antonius
- Romeo and Juliet (1997), Friar Laurence
- The Taming of the Shrew (1997), Hortensio
- Macbeth (1995), Banquo
- Cymbeline (1986), Cloten
- The Winter's Tale (1986), Young Shepherd
- King Lear (1985), Edmund
- Twelfth Night (1985), Antonio
- A Midsummer Night's Dream (1984), Demetrius
- Love's Labour's Lost (1984), Ferdinand
- The Merchant of Venice (1984), Arragon
- Falstaff (Henry IV, Part II) (1965), Page to Falstaff
