= Douglas Campbell (actor) =

Canadian actor (1922–2009)

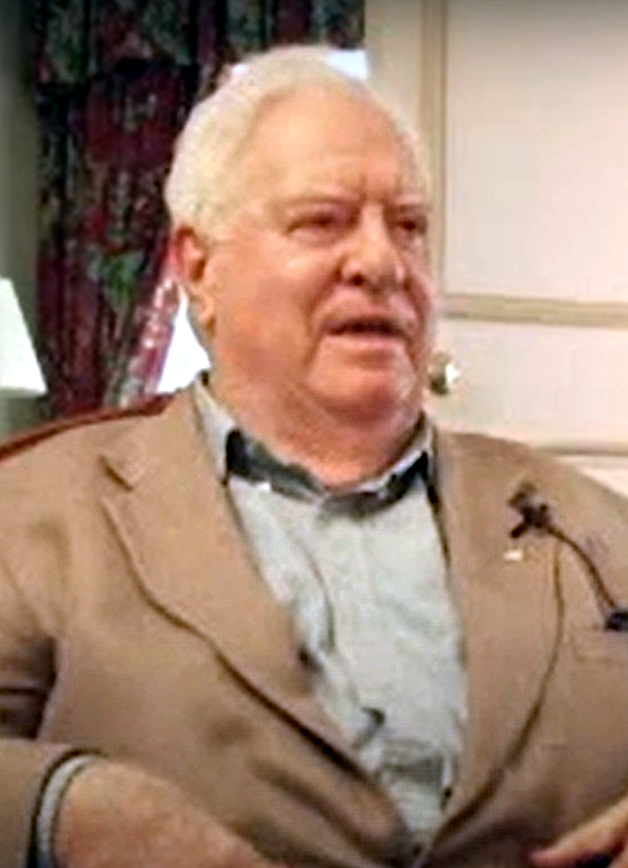
- Campbell circa 2007
- Born: 11 June 1922; Glasgow, Scotland
- Died: 6 October 2009 (aged 87); Montreal, Quebec, Canada
- Occupation: Actor
- Years active: 1941–2000
- Spouses: Ann Casson (m. 1947; died 1990); Moira Wylie (m. 1993)
- Children: 6, including Benedict and Torquil

Douglas Campbell, CM (11 June 1922 – 6 October 2009) was a Canadian-based stage actor. He was born in Glasgow, Scotland.

== Acting career ==
Campbell's interest in the theatre began at London's Old Vic Theatre at age 17, where working as a stage hand he saw Tyrone Guthrie's production of King John. He first performed in the 1941 Old Vic touring productions of Medea and Jacob's Ladder.

He was invited to Canada in 1953 by Guthrie, who had just been appointed the first artistic director of the fledgling Stratford Festival of Canada in Stratford, Ontario. Campbell played Hastings in the opening production of Richard III in 1953, and King Oedipus in the stage and screen production of Oedipus Rex in 1954. He appeared many times at Stratford in the fifty years that followed, drawing great acclaim in the role of Othello in 1959, and in many appearances as Falstaff.

Campbell acted and directed on other stages. Campbell founded the Canadian Players in 1954. He acted and directed several plays at the Crest Theatre in Toronto in 1955. He was artistic director at the Guthrie Theater in Minneapolis from 1966 to 1967.

He was awarded the Order of Canada on 17 April 1997. Campbell received a Governor General's Performing Arts Award, Canada's highest honour in the performing arts, in 2003.

== Personal life ==
In 1947, Campbell married Ann Casson, actress and daughter of Sir Lewis Casson and Dame Sybil Thorndike. His children from that marriage are Dirk Campbell, television director; Teresa Padden who played Cordelia to his first King Lear, Tom Campbell, painter; Benedict Campbell, actor. In the late 1960s, Campbell developed a relationship with Moira Wylie, an actress and director, with whom his children Beatrice and Torquil Campbell were born. Beatrice Campbell is a stage manager at the Shaw Festival while Torquil Campbell is an actor and lead singer/songwriter of the indie rock band Stars. Casson, whom Campbell never divorced, died in 1990. He and Wylie married in 1993. Campbell was a pacificist and vegetarian.

Campbell died at Hôtel Dieu hospital in Montreal, Quebec, from complications of diabetes and congestive heart disease on 6 October 2009.

== Filmography ==
=== Films ===
Film
Year	Title	Role	Notes
1957	Oedipus Rex	Oedipus	
1965	When Tomorrow Dies	Doug James	
1972	A Fan's Notes	Paddy the Duke	
1979	Lost and Found	British Professor	
1980	Double Negative	Crichett, Sr.	
1980	Nothing Personal	The Walker	
1982	If You Could See What I Hear	Porky Sullivan	
1983	Strange Brew	Henry Green	
1983	Snow	Nick	Short film
1985	Perfect	Party Pro	Credited as Doug Campbell
1990	I Bought a Vampire Motorcycle	Mr. Bancroft	
2000	Once Upon a Christmas	Santa Claus	Final film role

=== Television ===
Television
Year	Title	Role	Notes
1953	Sunday Night Theatre	The Stranger	Season 4, episode 19: "The Lady from the Sea"
1955	Omnibus		Season 3, episode 16: "Hamlet"
1955	On Camera		Season 1, episode 23: "The Queen's Ring"
1955	Scope	Colonel Thomas Talbot	Season 1, episode 19: "The Colonel and the Lady"
1955	First Performance	Colonel Thomas Talbot	Season 1, episode 1: "The Colonel and the Lady"
1955-1959	General Motors Theatre	Cal / O'Brien / Claggart / Terrence	4 episodes
1957-1960	DuPont Show of the Month	Squire Trelawny / Danglars / King Henry VIII / Various	4 episodes
1958	Suspicion	Armstrong	Episode 27: "The Girl Upstairs"
1958-1959	Folio	Sean Kelly	2 episodes
1959	Day of Decision	Narrator	Miniseries
1959	The Unforeseen		2 episodes
1959-1960	Startime	W.S. Gilbert	3 episodes
1960-1962	Festival	Don Alhambra del Bolero, the Grand Inquisitor / W.S. Gilbert / Dunlavin / Bill Bobstay, Boatswain's mate	4 episodes
1962	John Brown's Body	John Brown	TV movie
1964	The Defenders	Ed Clark	Season 3, episode 20: "The Pill Man"
1964	Twelfth Night	Sir Toby Belch	TV movie
1965	Profiles in Courage	John Quincy Adams	Episode 22: "John Quincy Adams"
1975	Performance	Sir George Simpson	Episode 5: "The Man in the Tin Canoe"
1976	Bill Brand	Reg Starr	Miniseries
1979–1982	The Great Detective	Inspector Alistair Cameron	35 episodes
1981	You've Come a Long Way, Katie		Miniseries; 3 episodes
1984	Sam Hughes's War		TV movie
1984	Charlie Grant's War	Manlus	TV movie
1985	The Edison Twins	Harry	Season 3, episode 4: "Monkey in the Middle"
1986	The Boys from Syracuse	Prologue	Uncredited
1986-1990	The Campbells	Justice Harris	2 episodes - 1 uncredited
1988	Adderly	Marty	Season 2, episode 20: "The Interrogation"
1991	Mark Twain and Me		TV movie
1998	Due South	Capt. Ed Smithers	2 episodes
2000	Anne of Green Gables: The Continuing Story	Dr. Powell	Miniseries; 2 episodes Final TV role
