= Mary Casson =

British actress (1914–2009)

- Born: 22 May 1914; London, England, United Kingdom
- Died: 22 September 2009 (aged 95)
- Occupation: Theatre actress
- Years active: 1921–mid-1970s
- Spouse: William Devlin (m. 1936; div. 1948)
- Children: 1

Mary Casson (22 May 1914 – 22 September 2009) was an English theatre actress who made her name in portraying characters in the plays of William Shakespeare and Wendy Darling in Peter Pan. Born into a theatrical family, she was in the theatre until the late 1930s before she switched to a career in music touring the United Kingdom.

== Biography ==
Mary Casson was born on 22 May 1914 in the British capital of London. She was the daughter of the actor and director Lewis Casson and the actress Sybil Thorndike. Casson was part of a theatrical family that included her brothers Christopher, John and a sister Ann. She was educated at home until she was seven years old when she was sent to the Francis Holland School in Sloane Square. Casson made her debut in the theatre at the age of six when she appeared as Belinda Cratchit in a 1921 production of Charles Dickens' A Christmas Carol at the Lyric Theatre. She appeared alongside her mother as Astyanax in The Trojan Women in 1922 and was Warwick's page in Saint Joan in Paris in 1924. Three years later, Casson made the first of six successive appearances as Wendy Darling at the Christmas performance of Peter Pan in the Gaiety Theatre and returned there in 1928. That year, she also toured South Africa with her parents, playing in Medea, Jane Clegg, The Lie, and Saint Joan.

In 1929, she appeared opposite Gerald du Maurier in J. M. Barrie's Dear Brutus, and made another appearances as Wendy Darling in Peter Pan at the St. James's Theatre from 1929 to 1931. Casson played the same character twice more in the same play at the Palladium Theatre between 1931 and 1933. She played the Second Witch in Macbeth in April 1932 at the Kingsway Theatre, and went on to portray more of William Shakespeare's characters, such as Juliet, Ophelia, Olivia in Twelfth Night, Nerissa in The Merchant of Venice and Bianca in The Taming of the Shrew for which her performances were praised for "their sincerity and freshness." From their wedding at the Reedmer Church in London on 7 March 1936 to 1948, Casson was married to the actor William Devlin and the couple had a daughter; Casson and Deviln had become engaged in December 1932.

Afterwards, she began a second career as a musician touring the United Kingdom and accompanied herself on the virginals. In 1952, Casson married her daughter's primary school teacher, Ian Haines, and worked as an accompanist in schools in Barking, East London until she retired in the mid-1970s. She began to play the organ at the age of 70 and continued to play the instrument at the St Andrews Church in Wickhambreaux near Canterbury a few weeks before her death. Casson died on 22 September 2009.

== Personality ==
The journalist Jonathan Croall described Casson as "a lively, intelligent woman, full of the zest for life that characterised her mother" and had "a clear-sighted view of her parents".
