= Chelsea Manor Street =

Street in Chelsea, London

Coordinates: 51°29′18.15″N 0°10′6.24″W

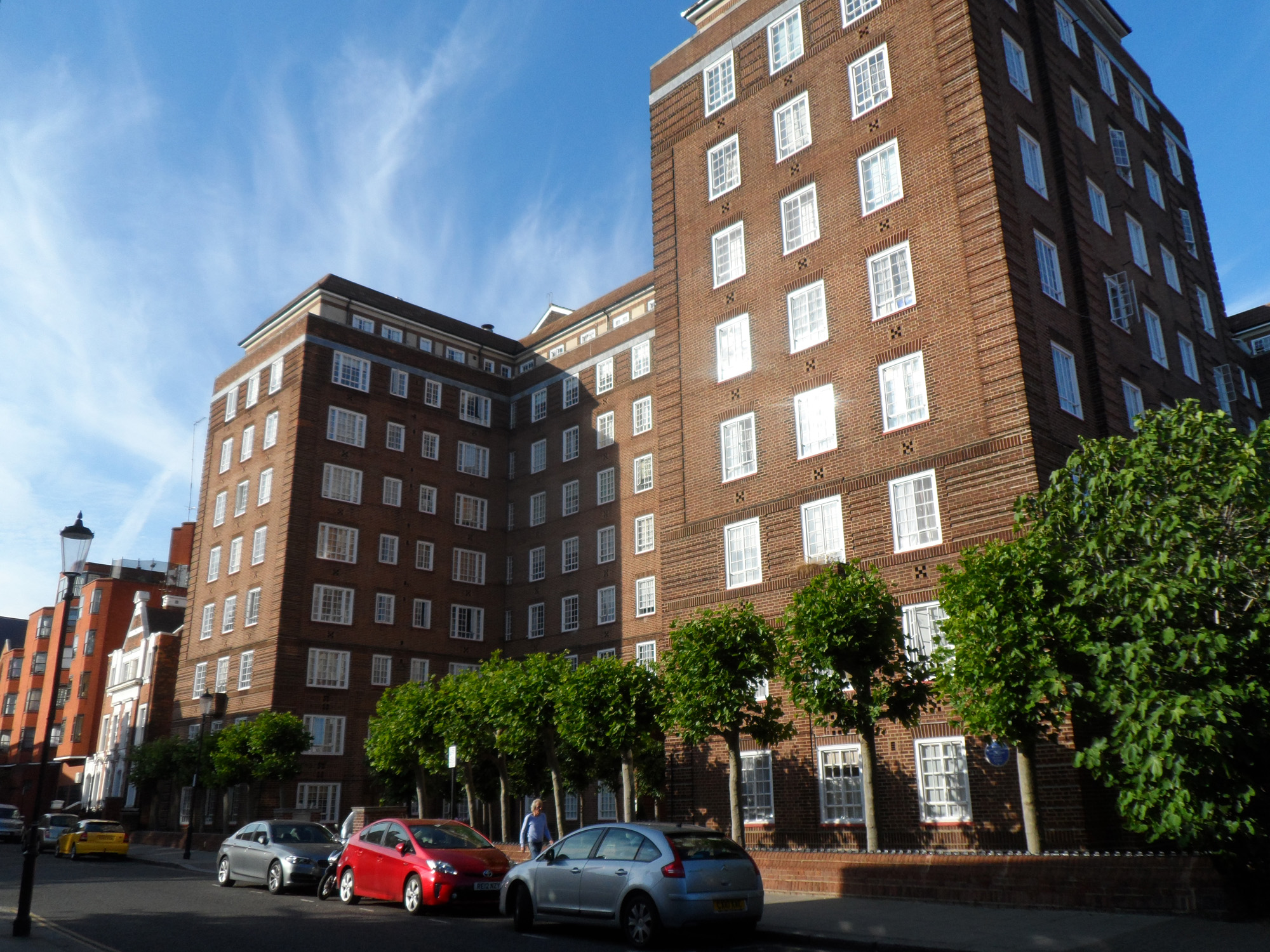
Swan Court, Chelsea Manor Street

Chelsea Manor Street is a street in Chelsea, London. It runs roughly north to south from Britten Street, crossing King's Road to St Loo Avenue. The southern continuation, Cheyne Gardens ends at Cheyne Walk.

It was originally called Manor Street.

In 1931, the Peabody Trust built the Chelsea Manor Street estate of eight blocks totalling 111 flats, designed by Victor Wilkins. Following modernisation in the 1970s, there are now 103 flats.

The designers Edward McKnight Kauffer and Marion Dorn lived at Swan Court, Chelsea Manor Street, and this is commemorated by a blue plaque placed by English Heritage in 2015. The actress Sybil Thorndike and her husband, the actor and director Lewis Casson, lived there for many years, and she died there in 1976.

Chesil Court, an Art Deco block, was home to Frank Pakenham, 7th Earl of Longford and Elizabeth Longford, who had a "wholly unpretentious" flat there.

== Sources ==
- Croall, Jonathan (2008). Sybil Thorndike: A Star of Life. London: Haus. ISBN 978-1-905791-92-7.
