= Ann Casson =

British actress (1915–1990)

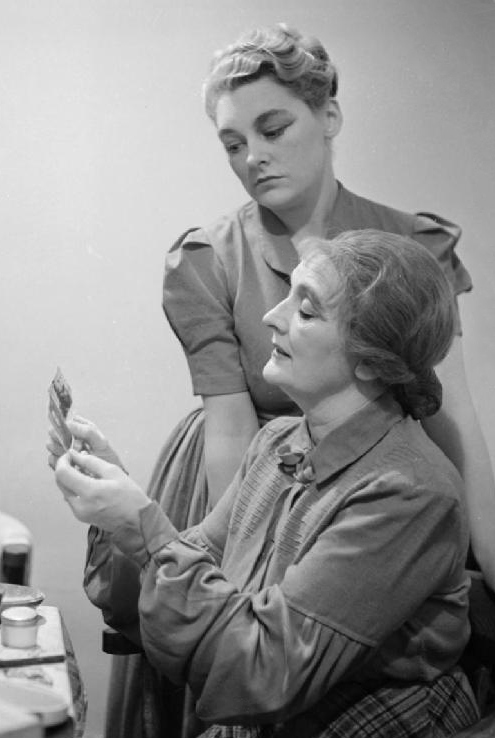
- Casson with mother preparing for a theatrical performance in Australia in 1932
- Born: 6 November 1915; London
- Died: 2 May 1990 (aged 74); London
- Occupation: Actress
- Years active: 1930–1990
- Spouse: Douglas Campbell (m. 1947)
- Children: 4, including Benedict Campbell
- Parents: Lewis Casson (father); Sybil Thorndike (mother)
- Family: Christopher Casson (brother); Mary Casson (sister); Russell Thorndike (uncle)

Ann Casson (6 November 1915 – 2 May 1990) was an English actress. She was a daughter of the actors Lewis Casson and Sybil Thorndike. Her theatre career spanned nearly seventy years and included plays by Shakespeare, Shaw and Coward, Greek tragedy, pantomime, and Gilbert and Sullivan.

Most of Casson's career was in Britain, but in the 1950s she moved to Canada for some years, becoming a member of the Stratford Festival company. Returning to England in the 1970s she became a leading member of the Crucible Theatre company.

== Life and career ==
=== Early years – child actress ===
Ann Casson was born in London on 6 November 1915, the youngest of the four children of the actor Lewis Casson and his wife, Sybil Thorndike. She was educated privately and made her stage debut in the role of Tiny Tim in a dramatisation of A Christmas Carol at the Lyric Theatre, London on 6 February 1921. As a child actor she appeared in plays including Peer Gynt, The Trojan Women, Quality Street and Medea. In 1928 she played Daisy Ashford in The Young Visiters in London and accompanied her parents to South Africa in a 1928–29 tour, playing four roles including Young Macduff in Macbeth and Warwick's Page in Shaw's Saint Joan.

=== Adult roles ===
During the 1930s Casson's stage roles included Janet in The Way to the Stars, Lady Flavia in Jack and the Beanstalk, Maria Siddons in Mrs Siddons, the Princess in Aladdin, Chastity in The Seven Deadly Virtues, Vivie Warren in Mrs Warren's Profession, Violet Robinson in Man and Superman, Clara Eynesford-Hill in Pygmalion, Perdita in The Winter's Tale, Clare Wedderbum in Hands Across the Sea, Elsie Gow in Fumed Oak, Gladys in George and Margaret – which she played for two years – and Cassandra in The Trojan Women.

In September 1940 Casson joined the Old Vic company, which over the next two years made tours of Britain's mining districts and industrial towns under the banner of the Council for the Encouragement of Music and the Arts. She played Prince Arthur in King John, Chorus in Medea, Lady Macduff in Macbeth, and Rachel in Laurence Housman's biblical drama Jacob's Ladder. In the West End she again played Arthur in King John at the New Theatre and Regan in King Lear, and Olivia in Twelfth Night at the St James's.

For the rest of the 1940s she toured, playing Vivie in Mrs Warren's Profession, Raina in Arms and the Man, Ann in Man and Superman and Joan in Saint Joan, also playing the last of these at the King's Theatre, Hammersmith and on the Continent. Shaw encouraged her to take on the role, which he had written for Sybil Thorndike, to whom he wrote, "She has the authentic Saint Joan tradition, and I look to her to rescue the part from the snivelling Bergners and Pitoëffs, who do nothing but cry and leave out all the strong lines". To Casson herself he wrote, "You are in exactly the right humour for it; for Joan is a volcano of energy from beginning to end, and never the snivelling Cinderella, born to be burnt, that all the others – except [Thorndike] – made her".

=== Post-war ===
At the King's she played the title role in Electra by Euripides (1946), in which, as The Times commented, "she was required to murder (off-stage of course) Dame Sybil", who played Electra's mother, Clytemnestra. Casson married a fellow actor, Douglas Campbell, in 1947. In 1949 she joined the Birmingham Repertory Theatre, and the following year she and her husband were members of the Citizens Theatre company in Glasgow, which was run by her elder brother, John Casson.

For four years, from 1950, Casson taught at the London Academy of Music and Dramatic Art. In 1953 the director Tyrone Guthrie invited Campbell to take part in the first Stratford Festival, in Ontario, Canada. Campbell remained a member of the Stratford company and the following year his wife and their four children moved to Canada with him. Casson and Campbell founded the Canadian Players, touring platform-style productions without costumes or scenery in areas of the country with no access to theatres. The biographer Jonathan Croall has written that they once staged Peer Gynt "with just two ladders and a plank". One of Casson's first parts with the company was Saint Joan. Later she became a member of the Stratford company. Her roles at Stratford ranged from Shakespeare to Gilbert and Sullivan. For the Canadian Broadcasting Corporation she appeared in television productions in roles including Åse in Peer Gynt, Lady Monchensey in The Family Reunion and the Duchess of Plaza-Toro in The Gondoliers.

In 1971 Casson and Campbell were company members in the inaugural season of the Crucible Theatre in Sheffield. A Crucible production of Thomas Dekker's The Shoemaker's Holiday opened a new London theatre, the Bankside Globe, the following year with Campbell and Casson in the leading roles of Simon and Margery Eyre. She continued acting until shortly before her death. Her final role was in Athol Fugard's The Road to Mecca, in Ontario.

Casson died in London on 2 May 1990, aged 74, survived by her widower, their three sons and one daughter.

== Partial filmography ==
- Escape (1930)
- The Shadow Between (1931)
- Number Seventeen (1932)
- Dance Pretty Lady (1932)
- Bachelor's Baby (1932)
- The Marriage Bond (1932)
- George and Margaret (1940)
- I Bought a Vampire Motorcycle (1990)

== Sources ==
- Croall, Jonathan (2008). Sybil Thorndike: A Star of Life. London: Haus. ISBN 978-1-905791-92-7.
- Gaye, Freda, ed. (1967). Who's Who in the Theatre (fourteenth ed.). London: Sir Isaac Pitman and Sons. OCLC 5997224.
