= The First Mrs. Fraser =

The First Mrs. Fraser may refer to:

- The First Mrs. Fraser (play), a 1929 play by St John Ervine
- The First Mrs. Fraser (1932 film), a British film directed by Sinclair Hill
- The First Mrs. Fraser (1950 film), a British television film
- The First Mrs. Fraser (1955 film), a German film directed by Erich Engel and Josef von Báky
