= Neill of Summerhill =

Neill of Summerhill: The Permanent Rebel
- Author: Jonathan Croall
- Language: English
- Subject: Biography, education
- Published: 1983 (Knopf Doubleday)
- Publication place: United States
- Pages: 428
- ISBN: 978-0-394-51403-1
- Dewey Decimal: 371.2

Neill of Summerhill is a 1983 biography of the educator A. S. Neill and his Summerhill School written by Jonathan Croall and published by Knopf Doubleday.
