= Jackie Maxwell =

Theatre director

- Born: 1956 (age 69–70); Belfast, Northern Ireland
- Education: University of Manchester
- Occupations: Theatre director; artistic director
- Years active: 1978–present
- Spouse: Benedict Campbell
- Children: 2, including Deragh Campbell

Jackie Maxwell (born 1956) is an Irish-born Canadian theatre director and dramaturge. She was the artistic director of the Shaw Festival from 2002 to 2016.

== Early life and education ==
Maxwell was born in Belfast, Northern Ireland. Her mother was an English and drama teacher and her father was a bookie. By the time Maxwell was nine, she became involved with the Youth Group of the Lyric Theatre in Belfast. In 1974, she began an honours degree in drama at the University of Manchester, England. While working as an usher at Contact Theatre in England, Maxwell me the man who would become her husband, Canadian actor Benedict Campbell. In January 1978, Campbell was offered a contract with the National Arts Centre to perform Troilus and Cressida; Maxwell accompanied him back to Canada.

== Career ==
After moving to Canada, Maxwell became involved with the Canadian theatre scene, working as a director at the National Arts Centre. John Wood gave Maxwell several assistant director positions before offering her a solo-directed show. Maxwell chose to direct The Changeling, starring Martha Burns. When Bob White, the then-artistic direct of Factory Theatre in Toronto, went on sabbatical, he asked Maxwell, still in her twenties, to take over the position. Though she was initially only supposed to serve one year, she stayed for seven (1987–95). Maxwell also served as Director of New Play Development at the Charlottetown Festival in Prince Edward Island.

Beginning with their 2002 season, Maxwell served as the artistic director for the Shaw Festival, succeeding Christopher Newton. Prior to becoming artistic director, she had served as the head of the new writing program of the Shaw Academy in the 1980s and directed Picnic in 2001. During her tenure at the Shaw Festival, Maxwell has included pieces by women writers from Shaw’s period, commissioned new translations by some of Canada’s most respected playwrights, presented Canadian classics on the playbill and initiated enormous growth in the area of new play development. Her choices of plays marked a move away from presenting only plays by Shaw and his contemporaries towards including contemporary playwrights.

Maxwell's extensive list of directed productions includes Chekhov's Three Sisters (2003), Marc Michel Bouchard's The Coronation Voyage (2003) and Githa Sowerby's Rutherford and Son (2004), Saint Joan (2007), Brief Encounters (2009), Jay Turvey/Paul Sportelli musical Maria Severa (2011).

Beginning with Shaw's 2015 season, Maxwell began to transition out of the role of artistic director. She served as artistic director for the 2015 and 2016 seasons and then oversaw the 2017 season. In 2016, as part of her final season as artistic director, Maxwell returned to Chekhov, whose Three Sisters she directed in her inaugural season as AD, and directed Uncle Vanya. Maxwell was succeeded as AD by Tim Carroll. In 2017, the festival renamed the Studio Theatre in Maxwell's honour, calling it the Jackie Maxwell Studio Theatre. The Studio Theatre was originally added to the Shaw Festival space during Maxwell's tenure as AD in 2009.

== Personal life ==
She is married to actor Benedict Campbell and has two children, Deragh and Lou.

== Awards and honours ==
Maxwell was award the Canadian Theatre Critics Association's Herbert Whittaker/Drama Bench Award in 2008. In 2016, Maxwell was made a member of the Order of Ontario.
