= Working Girls (1931 film) =

1931 film

- Directed by: Dorothy Arzner
- Screenplay by: Zoë Akins
- Based on: Blind Mice; 1930 play by Vera Caspary; Winifred Lenihan
- Starring: Judith Wood; Charles "Buddy" Rogers; Paul Lukas; Stuart Erwin; Frances Dee
- Cinematography: Harry Fischbeck
- Edited by: Jane Loring
- Music by: Ralph Rainger
- Production company: Paramount Pictures
- Distributed by: Paramount Pictures
- Release date: December 12, 1931
- Running time: 77 minutes
- Country: United States
- Language: English

Working Girls is a 1931 American pre-Code drama film directed by Dorothy Arzner and written by Zoë Akins, based on the play Blind Mice, written by Vera Caspary and Winifred Lenihan. The film stars Judith Wood, Charles "Buddy" Rogers, Paul Lukas, Stuart Erwin, and Frances Dee. The film was released on December 12, 1931, by Paramount Pictures.

== Plot ==
Two unsophisticated and undereducated sisters from Indiana, Mae (age 20) and June (age 19) Thorpe, move into the Rolfe charity apartment building for homeless girls in New York City. June applies for a job as a stenographer with scientist Joseph von Schrader, even though his advertisement clearly states it requires a good education, with college preferred. During the interview, June reveals that she never even started high school, then runs downstairs to fetch Mae, who has “a good education.” Von Schrader asks if Mae speaks French or German. Not much she replies, just “Donkey-shane” and “Wee Wee, monsure”, which she learned from a veteran of the War. She completed two whole years of high school, and has no real experience taking dictation. Seeing her feet are wet and she cannot afford rubbers, von Schrader takes pity on her and hires her. His name is pronounced “von Schrahhder”, but Mae starts her job by mispronouncing it with a long A.”

June tries for work at a fashion house but loses out because of the way she dresses and behaves. Being stylish, she is told, is not the same as having style. She gives herself a makeover and gets a job as a telegraph operator. She begins dating Pat Kelly, a successful saxophonist who performs on the radio. At her prompting, Kelly lavishes gifts—candy, orchids and perfume—on her. Mae meets Boyd Wheeler, a successful lawyer, in the shoe department and goes on to dinner with him. Both sisters barely make the midnight curfew at the Rolfe House..

Mae turns down a marriage proposal from von Schrader, making it clear she has a beau, and he fires her with the best of intentions, thinking that her future is secure, adding that he would be hurt by having her around. Mae tells June that Boyd—who is actually pretending to be sick—has arranged a double date at a ritzy friend's apartment. June has already signed out for an overnight—actually a date—and tells Mae to make Boyd take her out to eat.

Boyd's friend cancels. After dinner, Mae tells him she will always trust him and kisses him, Dissolve to Kelly on the bandstand and June dancing. In the morning, June returns to find Mae—who sneaked in—weeping. Mae did not even raise the issue of marriage with Boyd because “it would have seemed fresh…. How could a nice girl mention it if he doesn't?” June is mystified that Boyd is the only thing her sister is so simple about.

Boyd goes out of town for a month. Mae spends money on new clothes, anticipating his return, but he telegraphs to tell her not to meet the train. She waits in vain to hear from him. In fact, Boyd has just become engaged to a beautiful socialite.

June unburdens herself to von Schrader, who kindly offers to rehire Mae. He takes June out to a Chinese dinner and draws her portrait, which he places on his desk. He is in love with her.

After her first week back at work, Mae asks von Schrader to renew his proposal. With some difficulty, she conveys the fact that she is pregnant. He agrees, graciously. Boyd is jilted by his fiancée and returns to Mae while her girlfriends celebrate her engagement. June sees him waiting outside the apartment and tells him to leave. When she tells Mae what she has done, her sister is distraught and finally tells June why she must marry.

Kelly, Mae, and June—wielding Kelly's gun—go to the apartment where Boyd has been telling Bill how much he loves Mae. Boyd takes a moment to salve his pride and eagerly agrees to marry Mae.

Later, June and Kelly run into von Schrader at a Chinese restaurant, and after sending Kelly away, June tells von Schrader the news. Far from being disappointed, he reveals he is in love with her, and she reciprocates.

== Cast ==
- Judith Wood as June Thorpe
- Dorothy Hall as Mae Thorpe
- Charles "Buddy" Rogers as Boyd Wheeler
- Paul Lukas as Dr. Joseph Von Schrader
- Stuart Erwin as Pat Kelly
- Frances Dee as Louise Adams
- Mary Forbes as Mrs. Johnstone
- Claire Dodd as Jane
- Dorothy Stickney as Loretta
- Alberta Vaughn as Violet
- Claude King as Mr. Adams

== Legacy ==
Arzner later described the film (characterized later as a feminist work) as one of her favorites, but the movie did not receive much attention on a limited release. The film languished in obscurity without a home video release from its rightsholder (which was Universal Pictures after the studio bought a number of Paramount's old library). Prints exist of the film, which included one screened at UCLA in 2015, in addition to bootlegs. The film is often available on The Criterion Channel, most recently in May 2026.
