= Garrick Theatre (New York City) =

Former theatre in Manhattan, New York

Coordinates: 40°45′1.3″N 73°59′12.26″W

- Harrigan's Theatre
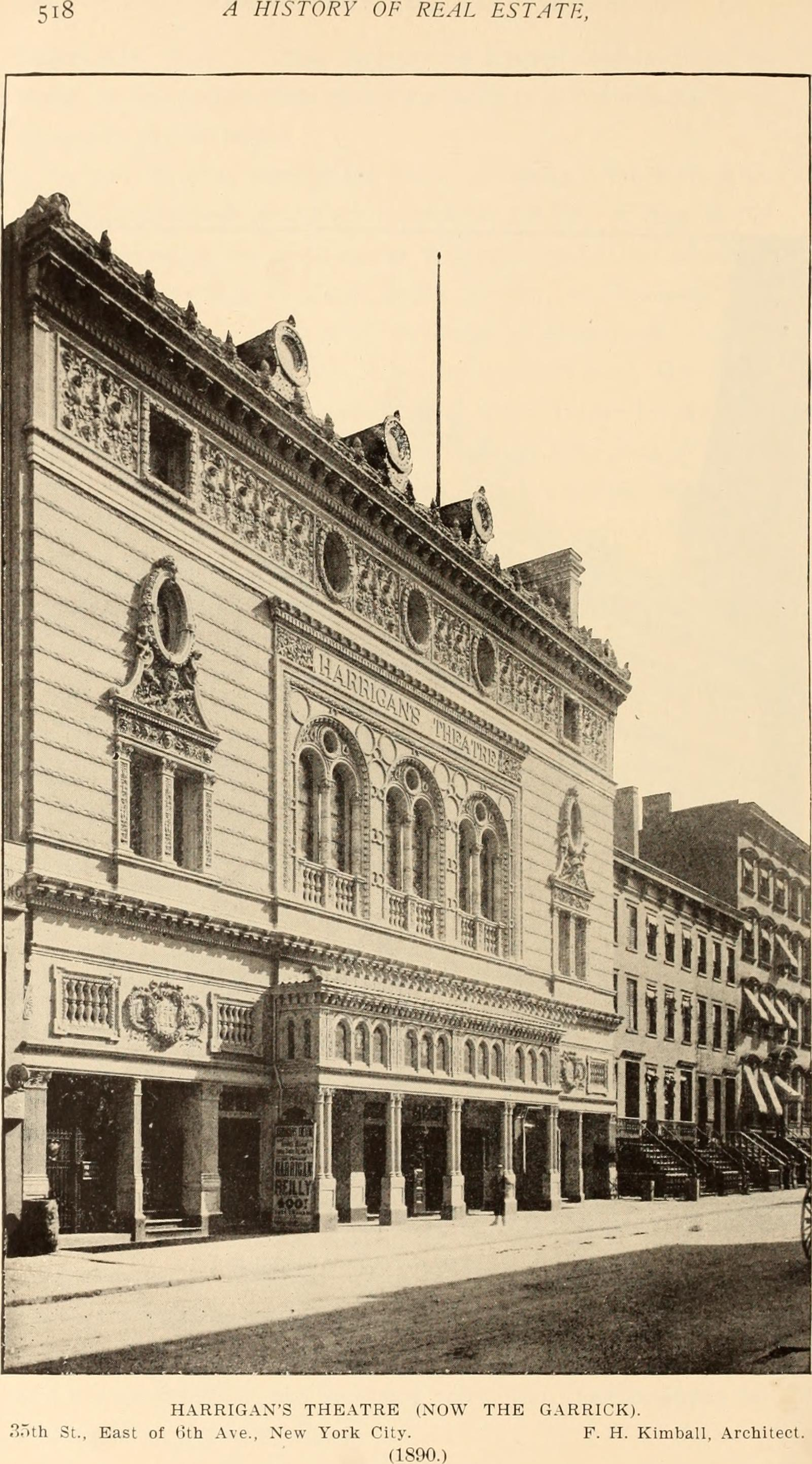
- Interactive map of Garrick Theatre
- Address: 67 West 35th Street; New York City, New York; U.S.
- Owner: The Shubert Organization
- Capacity: 910
- Type: Broadway

Construction
- Opened: 1890 (136 years ago)
- Closed: 1929 (97 years ago)
- Demolished: 1932 (94 years ago)
- Years active: 1890–1929
- Architect: Francis H. Kimball

The Garrick Theatre (originally named Harrigan's Theatre) was a 910-seat theatre built in 1890 and located on 67 West 35th Street in Manhattan, New York City. It closed in 1929 and the building was demolished in 1932.

== History ==
In January 1890, American playwright Edward Harrigan announced that he would be commissioning a new theatre in Manhattan on 35th Street near Sixth Avenue called Harrigan's Theatre. He purchased a property that was previously occupied by St. Mark's Methodist Episcopal Church (a "colored" church) and a four-story apartment buildings. Harrigan paid $72,500 for the church property and $43,500 for the dwelling, possibly with financial assistance from banker Austin Corbin. Originally, the theatre was to open in September 1890, though this date was pushed back to December 22, 1890, when Harrigan debuted a new play titled Reilly and the 400. The theatre was designed by architect Francis Hatch Kimball.

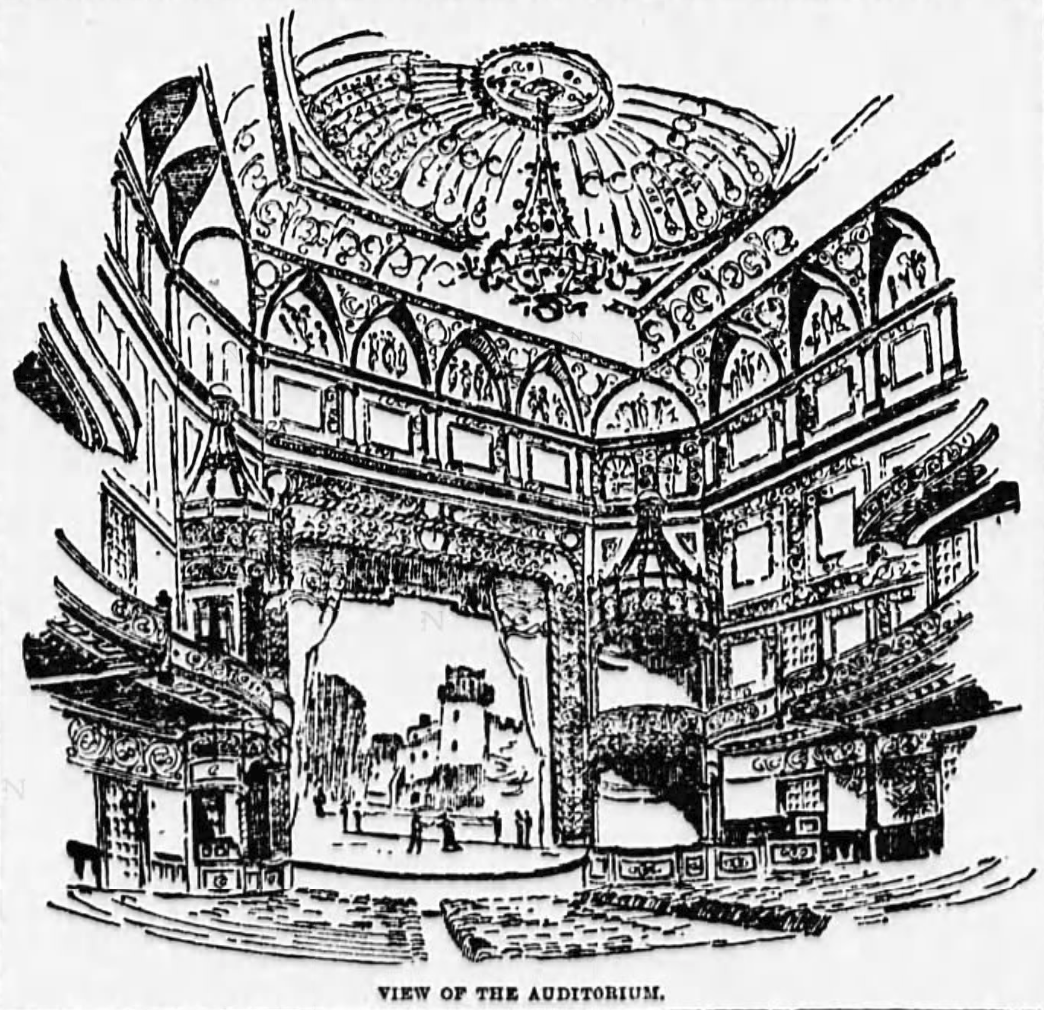
Interior of Harrigan's Theatre, as published in the New York Herald in 1890

Harrigan managed the theatre until 1895, when Richard Mansfield took over, renaming it the Garrick Theatre. Charles Frohman assumed management from 1896 until 1915. The Shuberts bought it in 1916 and leased it to Otto Kahn, who named it Théâtre du Vieux-Colombier, after a theatre in Paris of the same name. Kahn later gave it to the Theatre Guild and it resumed the name Garrick Theatre in 1919. The Shuberts resumed management in 1925 and the theatre closed as a playhouse in 1929. After a short run of burlesque, the building was demolished in 1932.

== Design ==
The theatre was designed by Francis Hatch Kimball, the architect who had also built Madison Square Theatre and the Montauk Clubhouse in Brooklyn. The property lot, previously a church and an apartment building, had a frontage of 75 feet and a depth of 100 feet.

The interior of the theatre was decorated in the style of the Italian renaissance and lavishly ornamented. It described by the New York Herald as "commodious and well equipped with exits." The lobby had a mosaic floor with ornamented walls and ceilings. Very little wood was used in the auditorium, as to prevent fires.

The front exterior of the building, described as "probably the most noticeable of any in New York", was a light cream-colored brick with terra cotta ornamental work and cornices. The roof was covered in Spanish tiles.

== Notable productions ==
- Sherlock Holmes (1899)
- Captain Jinks of the Horse Marines (1901)
- Gallops (1906)
- Jane Clegg (1920)
- Enter Madame (1920)
- Mr. Pim Passes By (1921) and (1927) revival
- Liliom (1921)
- He Who Gets Slapped (1922)
- R.U.R. (1922)
- Peer Gynt (1923)
- The Adding Machine (1923)
- Saint Joan (1923)
- Fata Morgana (1924)
- They Knew What They Wanted (1924)
- Processional (1925)
- Garrick Gaieties (1925)
- The Mystery Ship (1927)
- The Taming of the Shrew (1927)
