= Winifred Lenihan =

American actor, writer and director (1898–1964)

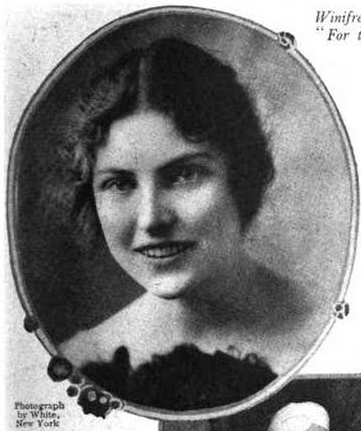
- Winifred Lenihan, from a 1920 publication.
- Born: Winifred Lenihan; December 6, 1898; Brooklyn, New York USA
- Died: July 27, 1964 (aged 65); Sea Cliff, New York USA
- Occupations: Actress; Playwright; Director
- Spouse: Frank Walker Wheeler (1934–1941) his death

Winifred Lenihan (December 6, 1898 – July 27, 1964) was an American actress, writer, and director. She studied at the American Academy of Dramatic Arts before making her debut in 1918. Although she portrayed the would-be eloper Anne in The Dover Road (1921), Anne Hathaway in Will Shakespeare (1923), and the resourceful Mary Todd in White Wings (1926), she is recalled mostly as Joan of Arc in the original American production of Saint Joan (1923).

== Early life and education ==
Lenihan was born in Brooklyn and, as she said, "always lived within subway distance of 42nd Street." She had an early interest in acting.

At Bryant High School in Queens, she organized a dramatic company and played leads. Although she was attracted by the theater, she recalled, she had no idea of how to get on the stage, and so dismissed the idea as romantic and nice but impractical.

"I was all packed up to go to Smith College to prepare for a teachers career", she said in 1920, "when an advertisement of a dramatic school caught my eye. I went there, took the tests and became a pupil."

== Career ==
From the school, the American Academy of Dramatic Arts in New York, she made her stage debut in 1918 as Belline in The Betrothal at the Playhouse in New York. Then she played in stock leading roles, portraying everything from an "ingenue to an old woman."

Although she appeared in other plays during the 1920s and the early '30s, Lenihan gradually became more interested in directing and teaching.

In 1925, she became the first director of the Theater Guild's School of Acting in New York. Although she hesitated at first when she was offered the post, she said, "the idea of directing a group of students in the art of acting intrigued me."

There was another reason, too. Like others, she was haunted by the inevitable months of idleness on Broadway. Even though she might be able to carry herself financially, her boundless energy revolted against any thumb-twiddling periods. While Lenihan devoted much of her talent and time to teaching acting, she felt that talent was innate and, while it could be improved, it could not be created. She looked for "warmth of emotion, imagination and intelligence."

In 1932, the actress went into radio to direct a series of Booth Tarkington sketches that were sponsored by the Great Atlantic and Pacific Tea Company. She and radio were new to each other and she experimented often, sometimes to the chagrin of engineers.

When she directed a play on radio, she did not believe in letting the actors sit at tables in front of microphones reading the script. When a man was supposed to run, she had the actor run and then speak his lines rather than imitate a panting sound.

In 1928, Lenihan was on the cover of McCall's magazine. She was described as one of the "10 most beautiful women in the world."

As well as acting she directed several productions and co-wrote the play Blind Mice with Vera Caspary in 1930 which was made into the film Working Girls the following year. Her sole movie credit is the 1949 film noir Jigsaw.

Lenihan served on the council of Actors' Equity Association and in 1940 was the author of a resolution, adopted by the membership, excluding from office or employment on the union's staff any Communist, Nazi, or Fascist or sympathizer.

=== Saint Joan ===
When Saint Joan had its world premiere at the Garrick Theatre in New York in 1923, a slim blue-eyed actress of limited experience was chosen for the role of Joan of Orleans. Winifred Lenihan played the part so well that she became famous overnight.

Lenihan had arrived on Broadway only a short time before that and the initial joy of appearing on the stage had not yet worn off. She told an interviewer: "Here I am on Broadway. It does seem like a fairy tale."

Her performance as Joan was applauded by critics and audience alike. John Corbin, reviewing the play in The New York Times, said: "Joan's moods of frank girlhood, and of a sainthood patient and proud, are rendered with consummate simplicity and graces." Of Lenihan's performance, he wrote: "Taken as a whole, it is a really great performance and one which, like the play, grows mightily in memory."

Many years later, theater writers were still praising her performance whenever they mentioned Saint Joan. Brooks Atkinson wrote in The Times that Lenihan and Katharine Cornell, who played the role later, "left their marks on the part, for both of them had something genuine to give it."

== Personal life ==
She married Frank Walker Wheeler in 1934, then vice president of the Great Atlantic and Pacific Tea Company. He died 7 years later on August 31, 1941.

Lenihan died of a heart attack on July 27, 1964, at her home in Sea Cliff, New York. She was 65 years old.

== Filmography ==
Year	Title	Role	Notes
1949	Jigsaw	Mrs. Hartley	
