= The First Mrs. Fraser (1932 film) =

1932 film

- Feature on the film in Picture Show (12 November 1932)
- Directed by: Sinclair Hill; Thorold Dickinson
- Written by: St. John Ervine (play); Peter Ellis; Leslie Howard Gordon
- Produced by: Louis Zimmerman
- Starring: Henry Ainley; Joan Barry; Dorothy Dix; Harold Huth
- Cinematography: Gunther Krampf
- Edited by: Thorold Dickinson
- Music by: Colin Wark
- Production company: Sterling Films
- Distributed by: Sterling Films
- Release date: April 1932
- Running time: 95 minutes
- Country: United Kingdom
- Language: English

The First Mrs. Fraser is a 1932 British musical romance film directed by Thorold Dickinson and Sinclair Hill and starring Henry Ainley, Joan Barry and Dorothy Dix. It was written by Peter Ellis and Leslie Howard Gordon, adapted from the 1929 play The First Mrs. Fraser by St. John Greer Ervine. It was made at Wembley Studios with sets designed by J. Elder Wills and Oscar Werndorff.

== Plot ==
James Fraser, after divorcing his first wife Janet, marries Elsie, but is unhappy. Elsie wants a divorce so as to marry Lord Larner but Fraser refuses and turns to Janet for advice, who subsequently finds Elsie is having an affaire with a gigolo. Janet forces Elsie to grant James a divorce, and Janet and James marry again.

== Cast ==
- Henry Ainley as James Fraser
- Joan Barry as Elsie Fraser
- Dorothy Dix as Janet Fraser
- Harold Huth as Mario
- Richard Cooper as Lord Larne
- Henry Charles Hewitt as Philip Logan
- Gibb McLaughlin as butler
- Hargrave Pawson as Ninian Fraser
- Millicent Wolf as Mabel
- Ellen Pollock as Maid
- Ivan Brandt as Murdo Fraser
- Oriel Ross as Connie
- Eileen Peel as Ellen Fraser
- Naunton Wayne as compere
- Frances Day as night-club singer
- Billy Cotton as himself
- Geraldo and his Gaucho Tango Orchestra as themselves

== Reception ==
The Daily Film Renter wrote: "Lavishly mounted and elaborately produced version of famous stage success. Picture which shows the large amount of money spent upon it. ... The defects of the film are the too 'refained' voices of the principals, and unnecessary tedium in many scenes which lose in dramatic value as a result. ... Sinclair Hill's direction, indeed, is hardly inspired; he has a tendency to allow scenes to rest too long, and should have speeded up action and dialogue, for it seems the big cast engaged really have no chance to shine as they undoubtedly should."

Picture Show wrote: "This film is a triumph for all concerned. No expense has been spared in making it, and the cabaret scenes are some of the finest and most lavish seen. The director has done an excellent piece of work and the cast is superb."
