= Sybil Thorndike =

English actress (1882–1976)

Dame Sybil Thorndike CH DBE
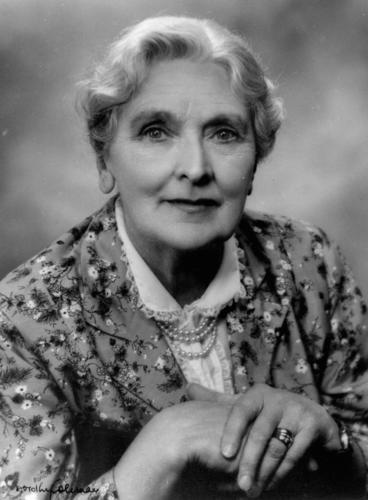
- Thorndike in 1943
- Born: Agnes Sybil Thorndike; 24 October 1882; Gainsborough, Lincolnshire, England
- Died: 9 June 1976 (aged 93); Chelsea, London, England
- Resting place: Westminster Abbey, London
- Occupation: Actress
- Spouse: Lewis Casson (m. 1908; died 1969)
- Children: 4, including Christopher Casson, Mary Casson, Ann Casson
- Relatives: Russell Thorndike (brother)

Dame Agnes Sybil Thorndike, Lady Casson (24 October 1882 – 9 June 1976), was an English actress whose stage career lasted from 1904 to 1969.

Trained in her youth as a concert pianist, Thorndike turned to the stage when a medical problem with her hands ruled out a musical career. She began her professional acting career with the company of the actor-manager Ben Greet, with whom she toured the US from 1904 to 1908. In Britain she played in old and new plays on tour and in the West End, often appearing with her husband, the actor and director Lewis Casson. She joined the Old Vic company during the First World War, and in the early 1920s Bernard Shaw, impressed by seeing her in a tragedy, wrote Saint Joan with her in mind. She starred in it with great success. She became known as Britain's leading tragedienne, but also appeared frequently in comedy.

During the Second World War, Thorndike and her husband toured in Shakespeare productions, taking professional theatre to remote rural locations for the first time. Towards the end of the war she joined Ralph Richardson and Laurence Olivier for two seasons staged by the Old Vic company in the West End. After the war she and Casson made many overseas tours, playing in Europe, Asia, Africa and Australia. They also appeared on Broadway.

Thorndike was mainly known as a stage actress, but made several films from the 1920s to the 1960s, among them The Prince and the Showgirl (1957) and Uncle Vanya (1963), both with Olivier. She also broadcast from time to time on radio and television. Her last stage appearances were in 1969 at the theatre named in her honour, the Thorndike Theatre, Leatherhead.

== Early years ==
Thorndike was born on 24 October 1882 in Gainsborough, Lincolnshire, the eldest of the four children of the Rev Arthur John Webster Thorndike (1853–1917) and his wife Agnes Macdonald, née Bowers (1857–1933), the daughter of a shipping merchant. From both parents Thorndike learned values of tolerance and concern for others that remained with her throughout her life. When she was two years old her father was appointed a minor canon of Rochester Cathedral. She was educated at Rochester Grammar School for Girls, and first trained as a classical pianist, making weekly visits to London for lessons at the Guildhall School of Music.

In May 1899 Thorndike gave her first solo piano recital, but shortly afterwards she developed recurrent pianist's cramp, and although she performed in leading concert venues in London – the Bechstein, Steinway and St James's halls – by 1902 it was clear that a musical career would be impossible. She studied for the stage at the drama school run by Ben Greet, who engaged her for an American tour beginning in August 1904, in advance of which she made her professional début at Cambridge in June, as Palmis in W. S. Gilbert's The Palace of Truth. She remained in Greet's company for three years playing in Shakespearean repertory throughout the US.

Thorndike in 1909

On her return to England, Thorndike was spotted by Bernard Shaw in a one-off Sunday night performance at the Scala Theatre in London; he invited her to join the company for a revival of his Candida to be given in Belfast by Annie Horniman's players. The company was based at the Gaiety Theatre, Manchester, where she first appeared in September 1908 as Bessie Carter in Basil Dean's Marriages are Made in Heaven. She played parts in nine other plays by authors ranging from Euripides to John Galsworthy. In the company she met, and formed a lifelong partnership with, the actor Lewis Casson. They married in December 1908 at her father's church. They had two daughters and two sons, all of whom went on the stage for some or all of their careers. (Note: The four were John Casson, Christopher Casson, Mary Casson and Ann Casson.)

Thorndike appeared at the Coronet Theatre, London, in June 1909 with the Horniman company, and at the Duke of York's Theatre in March 1910 with Charles Frohman's repertory company, appearing there as Winifred in The Sentimentalists, Emma Huxtable in The Madras House, Romp in Prunella and Maggie Massey in Chains. She then went to New York, where she appeared at the Empire Theatre in September 1910, as Emily Chapman in Smith opposite John Drew.

Between her return to Britain and the outbreak of the First World War in 1914, Thorndike appeared in the West End at the Aldwych Theatre in June 1912 as Beatrice Farrar in Hindle Wakes, and at the Playhouse Theatre in July 1912 in the same role. She returned to Manchester for a second season at the Gaiety later in the year, playing a range of roles in nine plays. At the Court Theatre in London in May 1913 she played the title role in St John Ervine's Jane Clegg, and in October she appeared in both Manchester and London as Hester in Eden Phillpotts' The Shadow.

== 1914–1919 ==
As Hecuba in Euripides's tragedy The Trojan Women, 1919

Between November 1914 and May 1918 Thorndike played in four seasons at the Old Vic (and one at the Shakespeare Memorial Theatre in 1916) with a mostly Shakespearean repertory. According to her biographer Jonathan Croall, she played "most of the main female characters" and – with a shortage of young actors during the war – she took six male roles including Prince Hal in Henry IV Part 1, the Fool in King Lear, Ferdinand in The Tempest and Puck in A Midsummer Night's Dream. (Note: Thorndike was not the only actress in the company to take on men's roles: in Henry IV, Part 1, fourteen of the male parts were played by women.) Her non-Shakespearean roles included Lady Teazle in The School for Scandal, Peg Woffington in Masks and Faces, Kate Hardcastle in She Stoops to Conquer, the Angel Gabriel in the mystery play The Star of Bethlehem, and Nancy in a stage version of Oliver Twist adapted by her brother Russell, who was the leading man of the company. (Note: The adaptation was co-written with Eric Ross.) Together, the siblings wrote and co-starred in two revues for the company: The Sausage String's Romance, or a New Cut Harlequinade and Seaman's Pie, a Naval Review of Revues and Other Things.

After leaving the Old Vic company, Thorndike was engaged by C. B. Cochran and appeared at the Oxford Music Hall, London, in June 1918 as Françoise in a sketch, "The Kiddies in the Ruins", which was introduced into The Better 'Ole. In various West End theatres during 1919 she appeared as Sygne de Coûfontaine in The Hostage, Naomi Melsham in The Chinese Puzzle, Clara Bortswick in The Great Day, Anne Wickham in Napoleon and in October she played Hecuba in The Trojan Women, adding to her growing reputation as Britain's leading tragedienne. Praising her as "a new leading lady" for the West End, The Times predicted, "Much as the Old Vic will regret it, it is hardly conceivable that Miss Thorndike will be allowed to cross over to the south side of the river again". In the event, she continued to appear in Old Vic productions as well as in the West End for nearly thirty years.

== 1920s ==
In early 1920 Thorndike successfully repeated her Hecuba and played the title roles in Shaw's Candida and in another Euripides play, Medea. The critic J. T. Grein wrote of the latter, "It is a great example of tragic acting, and a magnificent achievement". Later in the year Thorndike joined her brother and her husband in a two-year run of Grand Guignol melodramas at the Little Theatre.

As Saint Joan, 1924

The vogue for theatrical horror began to wane and Casson and Thorndike joined Bronson Albery and Lady Wyndham in the management of the New Theatre in 1922. They opened with Shelley's verse tragedy The Cenci. Shaw saw a performance, and told his wife, "I have found my Joan". He was planning a play about Joan of Arc, which he completed in 1923. It was his custom to open his plays on Broadway before their West End premieres, (Note: The world premieres of all Shaw's plays between 1920 and 1935 were in New York, with the single exception of The Apple Cart.) and the first actress to play his Joan was Winifred Lenihan, but the part was written with Thorndike in mind.

Saint Joan opened at the New Theatre in March 1924. Thorndike's performance received praise from the critics, but there were reservations: in The Times, A. B. Walkley said that she performed beautifully, but he found her "rusticity of speech a superfluity". The critic of The Daily Telegraph felt that no other actress could have better "hit off the Maid's simplicity without losing her strength". Desmond MacCarthy in the New Statesman, praised Thorndike for emphasising the "insistive, energetic, almost pert traits of the Maid as Mr Shaw conceives her" but thought she missed "the sweetness and simplicity of the Maid's replies and demeanour in the trial scene" though driving home Joan's "distress, her alertness, her courage". In The Observer, Lennox Robinson wrote that Thorndike's performance "was beautiful, was entirely satisfying. Mr Shaw was, indeed, nobly served." The initial London production ran for 244 performances, and Thorndike starred in revivals over the following 17 years not only in London (1925, 1926, 1931 and 1941) but at the Théâtre des Champs-Élysées, Paris (1927) and on tours of South Africa (1928) and the Middle East, Australia and New Zealand (1932−33).

In 1927−28 Thorndike was again a member of the Old Vic company, for a season at the Lyric Theatre, Hammersmith. She played Katherina in The Taming of the Shrew, Portia in The Merchant of Venice, Beatrice in Much Ado About Nothing and Chorus and the Princess of France in Henry V.

In the 1920s Thorndike entered films, appearing in four: as Mrs Brand in Moth and Rust (1921), various parts in Tense Moments from Great Plays (1922), (Note: This was an omnibus of one-reel adaptations of scenes from various well-known plays and novels. Thorndike appeared in scenes from Macbeth (as Lady Macbeth), Bleak House (Lady Dedlock), Jane Shore (Jane), La Dame aux Camélias (Marguerite), The Merchant of Venice (Portia), The Hunchback of Notre-Dame (Esmeralda) and The Scarlet Letter (Hester). The British Film Institute also lists a scene from Oliver Twist with Thorndike as Nancy.) Edith Cavell in Dawn (1928) and the Mother in To What Red Hell (1929). In 1923 she made her first radio broadcasts for the BBC; during the decade these included two of her best-known stage roles: Medea and Saint Joan.

== 1930s ==
Thorndike's roles of the early 1930s included the title part in Racine's Phèdre, Mrs Alving in Ibsen's Ghosts, and Emilia in a celebrated production of Othello at the Savoy Theatre with Paul Robeson and Peggy Ashcroft as Othello and Desdemona. In 1931 she was appointed DBE, the fourth actress to be made a Dame. (Note: The earlier theatrical Dames were May Whitty (1918), Ellen Terry (1925), and Madge Kendal (1926). Geneviève Ward was awarded an honorary DBE in 1921.) She appeared in a wide range of plays, both classical and modern, often under Casson's direction.

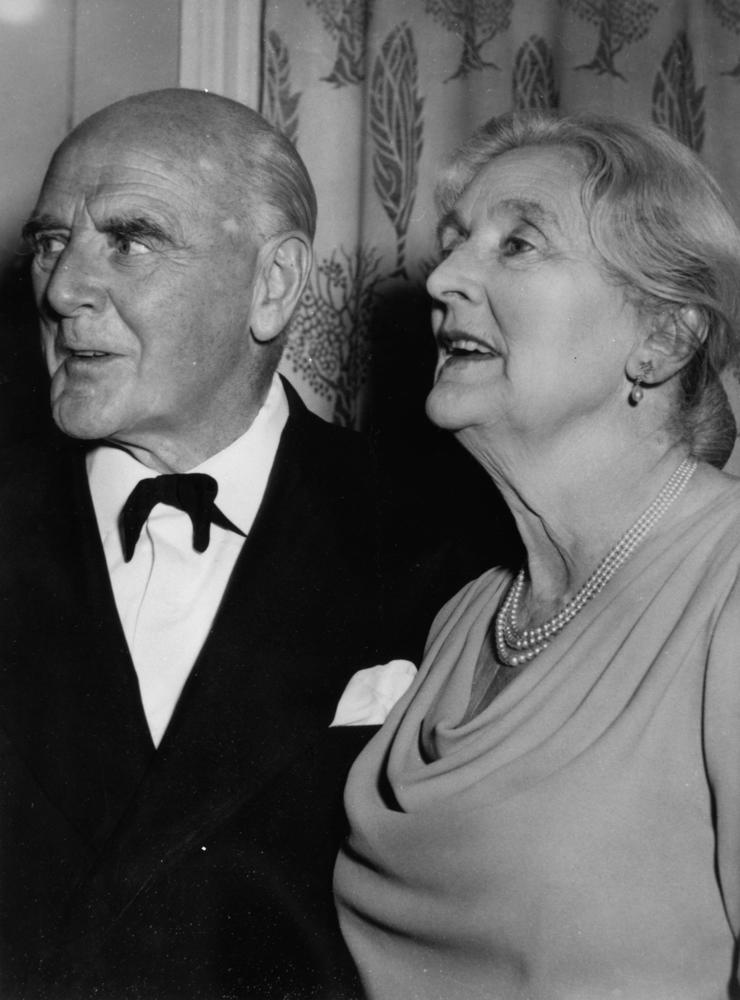
With Lewis Casson in Australia, 1932

From April 1932 to April 1933 Thorndike and Casson made a tour of Egypt, Palestine, Australia and New Zealand, in which she appeared in the satirical comedy Advertising April; Shaw's Captain Brassbound's Conversion; Ghosts; Clemence Dane's Granite; Macbeth; a romantic comedy, Madame Plays Nap; Milestones; The Painted Veil; Saint Joan and Sidney Howard's domestic drama The Silver Chord.

In the West End in September 1933 Thorndike appeared in The Distaff Side, by John van Druten, which she took to Broadway the following year, having in the interim played Gertrude in Hamlet for the Old Vic company at Sadler's Wells in an uncut, five-hour production directed by Greet (who appeared as Polonius). Thorndike and Casson were among the actors who felt an obligation to appear in the provinces as well as in the West End − according to the critic Hannen Swaffer "Sybil is the only actress whom the provinces treat like a queen" − and her expressed view was, "No actor has any business to say that they won't tour, it's part of our work". In 1936 the couple toured in plays by Euripides, Shaw, Noël Coward and D. H. Lawrence, and followed this with a tour of a new play, Six Men of Dorset, by Miles Malleson and Harvey Brooks the following year.

In 1938 Thorndike appeared in New York as Mrs Conway in J. B. Priestley's Time and the Conways, and in London as Volumnia in the Old Vic production of Coriolanus with Olivier in the title role as her son. In the West End she created the role of Miss Moffat in the long-running The Corn is Green (1938) by Emlyn Williams. According to The Times, this play "showed her at the top of her form as an English spinster with a vocation for teaching, and obtained for her and the author, who himself played the Welsh mining lad who was her star pupil, a heartening success on the eve of war and of new developments in theatrical life".

Thorndike made three films during the decade, appearing as Madam Duval in A Gentleman of Paris (1931), Mrs Hawthorn in Hindle Wakes (1931) and Ellen in Tudor Rose (1936). She made her television début in 1939 as the Widow Cagle in a melodrama, Sun Up.

== Second World War ==
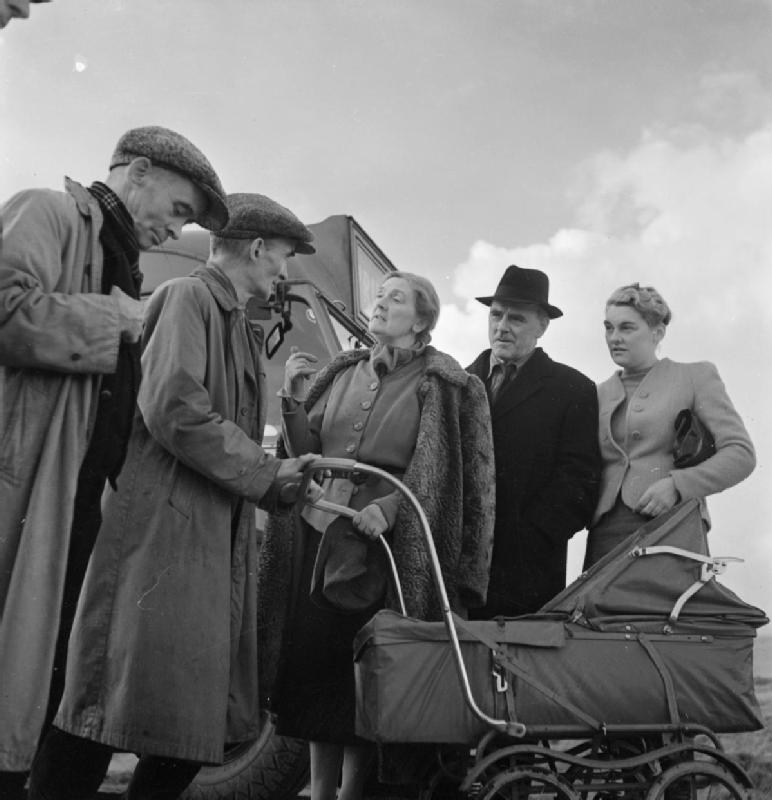
Thorndike, Casson and their daughter Ann with miners in Wales, 1941

When the Second World War began in September 1939, Thorndike, a convinced pacifist, protested against the conflict, but recognised that while it lasted the populace needed entertainment. In 1940 she took part in a film of Shaw's Major Barbara as General Baines, after which she and Casson joined a touring Old Vic company taking Macbeth to even the remotest corners of Wales. As there were few available hotels the actors frequently stayed with mining families, whom Thorndike found "wonderfully hospitable". By 1941, with the London blitz coming to an end, it was practical for the London theatre to revive, and the Old Vic company presented Shakespeare's rarely seen King John, in which Thorndike played Constance. As its own theatre had been severely bombed, the company played at the New Theatre. Later in the year the Cassons again toured Wales, adding Candida and Medea to their repertory.

When Ralph Richardson, Olivier and John Burrell were appointed to re-establish the Old Vic as a leading London company in 1944 they recruited Thorndike, who played Aase in Peer Gynt, Catherine Petkoff in Arms and the Man, Queen Margaret in Richard III, Marina in Uncle Vanya, Mistress Quickly in Henry IV, Parts 1 and 2, Jocasta in Oedipus Rex and the Justice's Lady in The Critic. Between August 1944 and April 1946 the company played in London and toured for the armed forces in Belgium, Germany and France.

After the defeat of Germany in 1945 a Nazi blacklist was found in Berlin, naming eminent people to be arrested after an invasion of Britain. Among them was Thorndike, as a prominent member of the National Council for Civil Liberties.

== Post-war and 1950s ==
When the Old Vic company played a season in New York in 1946 Thorndike chose to remain in England to appear with Casson. They were in Priestley's The Linden Tree in 1947, in which year Thorndike played Mrs Squeers in Nicholas Nickleby for the cinema, followed by another film, Britannia Mews in 1948, as Mrs Mouncey. In the theatre Thorndike and Casson were in a revival of John Home's tragedy Douglas at the Edinburgh Festival (1950), and without Casson, Thorndike starred with her old friend Edith Evans in N. C. Hunter's Waters of the Moon. The play, described by Croall as "a cosy middle-class drama [with] certain elements of Chekhov", received tepid reviews but proved popular with audiences and ran for 835 performances at the Theatre Royal, Haymarket between 1951 and 1953. The Cassons rejoined forces in Hunter's next play, A Day by the Sea (1953), directed by and co-starring John Gielgud. Like its predecessor, the play appealed more to the public than to the critics, and ran for 386 performances at the Haymarket. (Note: While the piece was in rehearsal Gielgud was arrested and fined for homosexual activity, and he was fearful of his reception by the first night audience. Unlike some in the profession Thorndike had no patience with homophobia. (Among those less sympathetic or helpful to Gielgud than Thorndike were Olivier and Edith Evans.) On the opening night Thorndike took the apprehensive Gielgud by the hand and whispered, "Come along, John darling, they won't boo me", and led him onstage − to applause and cheering from the audience.)

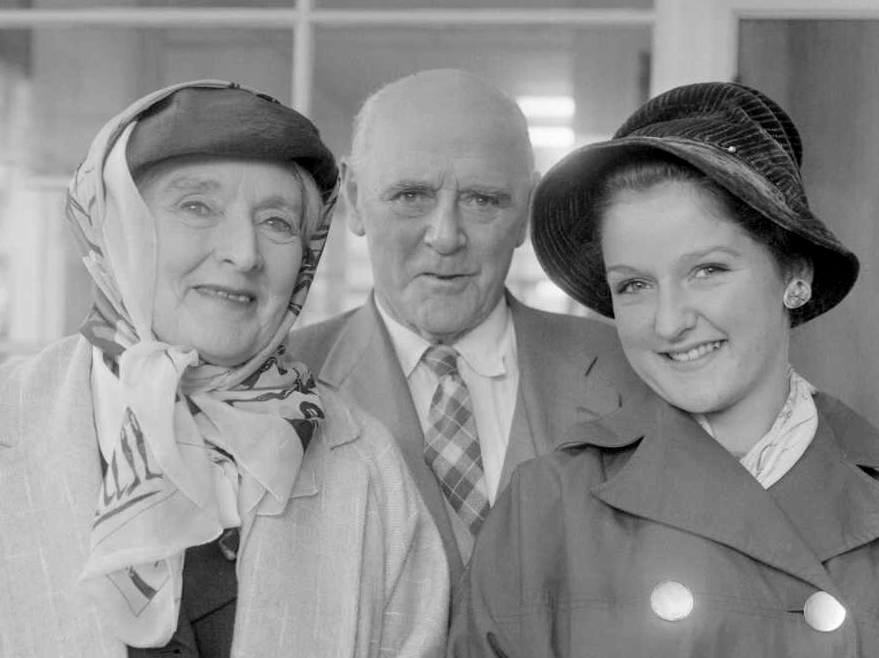
With Casson and their granddaughter Jane Casson in Australia, 1958

During the mid- and late-1950s Thorndike and Casson were seen more abroad than at home. They toured the Far East, New Zealand and India in 1954, giving dramatic recitals. Together with Richardson they toured Australia and New Zealand in 1955, presenting The Sleeping Prince and Separate Tables. The couple toured southern Africa, Kenya, Israel, and Turkey in 1956, giving dramatic recitals. In the West End in June 1956 Thorndike played Amy, Lady Monchensey in The Family Reunion, with Casson, Paul Scofield and Gwen Ffrangcon-Davies. In New York the couple appeared in the world premiere of Graham Greene's The Potting Shed, which ran on Broadway for 143 performances in 1957, after which they revisited Australia and New Zealand, touring in The Chalk Garden.

During the 1950s Thorndike appeared in eleven films: Stage Fright (as Mrs Gill, 1950), Gone to Earth (Mrs Marston, 1951), The Lady with a Lamp (Miss Bosanquet, 1951), The Magic Box (the Aristocratic Client, 1951), Melba (Queen Victoria, 1953), The Weak and the Wicked (Mabel, 1953), The Prince and the Showgirl (The Queen Dowager, 1957), Alive and Kicking (Dora, 1958), Smiley Gets a Gun (Granny, 1958), Shake Hands with the Devil (Lady Fitzhugh, 1959) and Jet Storm (Emma Morgan, 1959). Among her television appearances was a studio production of Waters of the Moon with Evans, Casson and Kathleen Harrison.

== Later years, 1960–1976 ==
Thorndike's first stage role of the 1960s was Lotta Bainbridge in Coward's Waiting in the Wings; she and Marie Löhr played the lead roles of two residents in a retirement home for actors and actresses, perpetuating, and finally resolving, an ancient feud. (Note: Coward wrote the play with Thorndike and Gladys Cooper in mind for the two main roles, but the original producer, Binkie Beaumont, did not send Cooper the script and mendaciously told Coward she had turned it down.) She said of it, "I loved that play. It's the most lovely modern play I've played", but the piece was not a great box-office success and closed after 188 performances. In 1961 Thorndike played the longest part of her career, the title role in Hugh Ross Williamson's Teresa of Avila, about the eponymous saint. She thought it "the most thrilling part I've been offered since Saint Joan", but Williamson's script, even after extensive revision by Casson, proved disappointing. Reviews were enthusiastic in their praise of Thorndike's performance, but neither the critics nor the public liked the play, which closed after six weeks.

In 1962 Olivier, as director of the Chichester Festival, mounted a production of Uncle Vanya. He assembled a cast headed by Michael Redgrave in the title role, supported by Olivier (as Astrov), Fay Compton, Joan Greenwood and Joan Plowright, in addition to Thorndike as Marina, the nurse, and Casson as Waffles. The critic J. C. Trewin wrote of "the most remarkably complete production – in my experience at least – of any play in our period". He called Thorndike's nurse "a miracle of gruff tenderness". The production was acknowledged as the highlight of the festival, and was revived the following year. Between the two stagings Thorndike appeared for the first time in a musical – playing the formidable Miss Crawley in an adaptation of Thackeray's Vanity Fair. The piece received bad reviews. The Guardian said that at her age Thorndike "should have known better than be caught up in this piece of prolonged nonsense", although The Times found consolation in her "blazingly theatrical figure" who "stamps every line with comic authority".

Olivier moved from Chichester to become the founding director of the National Theatre in late 1963. He included Uncle Vanya in his first season, with many of his Chichester cast reprising their roles, but Casson, by this time in his late eighties, declined, and Thorndike did likewise. At the Duchess Theatre in January 1964 she appeared as the Dowager Countess of Lister in William Douglas-Home's play The Reluctant Peer, a comic fictionalisation of the author's elder brother's recent renunciation of his peerage so as to be eligible for the premiership. Once again, Thorndike's notices were better than those for the play. Bernard Levin wrote, "she gets her fangs deep into the meatiest part she has had for years" and praised "the relish and zest she brings to her playing". She thought the critics were wrong to dismiss the play – "they only want avant-garde and classics now" – and was sorry when her contractual commitments forced her to leave the cast six months into the eighteen-month run.

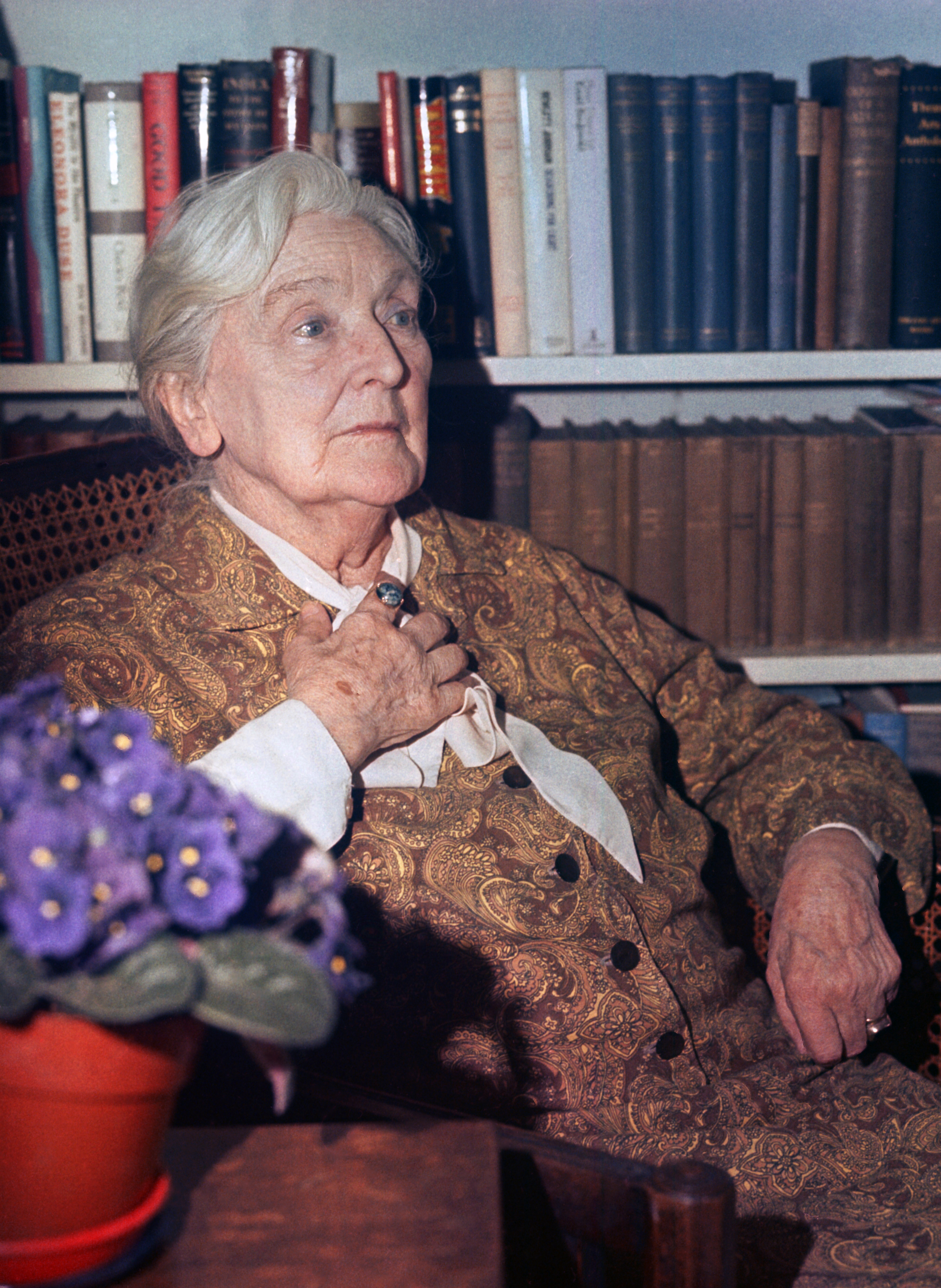
Thorndike by Allan Warren, 1972

After appearing in two successive box-office failures – Arthur Marshall's Season of Goodwill (1964) and William Corlett's Return Ticket (1965) – Thorndike rejoined Casson in what turned out to be their last West End production together, a revival of the classic black comedy Arsenic and Old Lace. With Athene Seyler co-starring as her equally well-meaning and homicidally lunatic sister, Thorndike enjoyed herself, the critics were enthusiastic, and the play ran from February to November 1966.

Thorndike appeared no more on the London stage after that. At the Yvonne Arnaud Theatre, Guildford, in January 1967 she played Claire Ragond in The Viaduct, and at the same theatre in February 1968 she appeared as Mrs Basil in Call Me Jacky. Later in that year she toured as Mrs Bramson in Emlyn Williams's thriller Night Must Fall.

During the 1960s Thorndike appeared in three films, as Lady Caroline in Hand in Hand (1960), Aunt Cathleen in The Big Gamble (1961), and as Marina in a film adaptation of Olivier's Chichester production of Uncle Vanya (1963). The television was not her favourite medium – she found it restricting – although she had a success in 1965 as Mrs Moore in a BBC adaptation of E. M. Forster's A Passage to India. Forster congratulated her on her performance, but she replied, "I loved Mrs Moore, but I am not wild about TV as a medium to express her! She's bigger than that".

Casson died in May 1969, and Thorndike's only stage role after that was in the inaugural performance of the theatre named in her honour, the Thorndike Theatre, Leatherhead, in October of that year, as the Woman in There Was an Old Woman by John Graham. She was appointed Member of the Order of the Companions of Honour in 1970. Her last public appearance was at the National Theatre's final night at the Old Vic in February 1976, where from a wheelchair she acknowledged the applause of her fellow members of the audience.

Thorndike and Casson had long lived at Swan Court, Chelsea, where she died on 9 June 1976, aged 93. Her ashes were interred in Westminster Abbey the following month, after a memorial service there.

== Reputation ==
Thorndike described herself as "an old-fashioned socialist, an Anglican and a pacifist – a mixture of which Mr Marx might disapprove". Corin Redgrave recalled, "Her shining spirit came through almost everything she did. She never wavered in her humanitarian Christian socialist beliefs". Giving the address at her memorial service, Gielgud called Thorndike "the most loved actress since Ellen Terry". Her obituarist in The Times said the same. Croall and many others have concurred.

Opinion is more divided about Thorndike's qualities as an actress. Sheridan Morley enlarged on Gielgud's comment, writing that she was not only the most loved actress but "one might add also the best". Gielgud thought her very fine in her playing of tragedy − "she was one of the few actresses of her generation who dared even to attempt it [and] riveted her audiences with her superb authority and vocal power" − but he thought her inclined to "hit too hard" in comedy. Hallam Tennyson felt "she over-elocuted: she was the last trace of the Irving-Terry era in which the important thing was to speak beautifully and clearly and be heard throughout the auditorium". Paul Scofield thought her "a glorious actress who suggested immense power. She aimed at the big targets, and used every ounce of her being to do justice to great classical themes".

== Notes, references and sources ==
=== Sources ===
- Castle, Charles (1972). Noël. London: W H Allen. ISBN 978-0-491-00534-0.
- Coward, Noël (1982). Payn, Graham; Morley, Sheridan (eds.). The Noël Coward Diaries (1941–1969). London: Methuen. ISBN 978-0-297-78142-4.
- Croall, Jonathan (2008). Sybil Thorndike: A Star of Life. London: Haus. ISBN 978-1-905791-92-7.
- Gaye, Freda, ed. (1967). Who's Who in the Theatre (fourteenth ed.). London: Sir Isaac Pitman and Sons. OCLC 5997224.
- Gielgud, John (1979). An Actor and His Time. London: Sidgwick and Jackson. ISBN 978-0-283-98573-7.
- Holden, Anthony (1988). Laurence Olivier. London: Weidenfeld and Nicolson. ISBN 978-0-297-79089-1.
- Gifford, Denis (1986). The British Film Catalogue 1895–1985: A Reference Guide. Newton Abbot: David & Charles. ISBN 978-0-7153-8835-8.
- Herbert, Ian, ed. (1972). Who's Who in the Theatre (fifteenth ed.). London: Sir Isaac Pitman and Sons. ISBN 978-0-273-31528-5.
- Holroyd, Michael (1997). Bernard Shaw: The One-Volume Definitive Edition. London: Chatto & Windus. ISBN 978-0-7011-6279-5.
- Mander, Raymond; Mitchenson, Joe; Day, Barry Day; Morley, Sheridan (2000) [1957]. Theatrical Companion to Coward (second ed.). London: Oberon. ISBN 978-1-84002-054-0.
- Morley, Sheridan (1986). The Great Stage Actors. London: Angus and Robertson. ISBN 978-0-207-14970-2.
- Morley, Sheridan (2001). John G – The Authorised Biography of John Gielgud. London: Hodder and Stoughton. ISBN 978-0-340-36803-9.
- Oldfield, Sybil (2022). The Black Book: The Britons on the Nazi Hit List. London: Profile. ISBN 978-1-78816-509-9.
- Tyson, Brian (1982). The Story of Shaw's Saint Joan. Kingston and Montreal: McGill-Queen's University Press. OCLC 1195025254.
