= I Bought a Vampire Motorcycle =

1990 film by Mont Campbell

- UK Quad poster
- Directed by: Dirk Campbell
- Screenplay by: Mycal Miller; John Wolskel
- Produced by: Mycal Miller; John Wolskel
- Starring: Neil Morrissey; Amanda Noar; Michael Elphick; Anthony Daniels
- Cinematography: Tom Ingle
- Edited by: Mycall Miller
- Music by: Dean Friedman
- Production company: Dirk Productions Ltd.
- Distributed by: Hobo Film Enterprises
- Release date: 6 July 1990
- Running time: 105 minutes
- Country: United Kingdom
- Language: English

I Bought a Vampire Motorcycle is a 1990 British comedy horror film about a motorcycle possessed by an evil spirit, which rides by itself and kills people, particularly members of a particular motorcycle gang. It stars Neil Morrissey as the bike's owner, Michael Elphick as a police inspector, and Anthony Daniels as a priest who attempts to exorcise the bike's evil spirit.

== Plot ==
A motorbike gang kills an occultist with a crossbow during a satanic ritual. One of the motorcycles is damaged during the ritual, and an evil spirit inhabits it. Noddy is then seen purchasing the bike from a dealer, but lies to his girlfriend, Kim, about the price. He proceeds to take it home and fix the damage caused by the crossbow alongside his friend, named Buzzer, and Kim. They replace the fuel tank, but when Buzzer steals the petrol cap, the bike kills him via decapitation.

When Noddy goes to the scene of his friend's death, he meets an inspector who smells like garlic. That night, he had multiple nightmares about Buzzer. The next day, Noddy and Kim go to a pub. Ten members of the motorbike gang from the beginning of the film enter the bar, and one of the bikers shoots the building with a crossbow. Kim is attacked by one of the bikers after declining his advances, which starts a bar-wide brawl between the motorbike gang, Kim, and Noddy. During the brawl, Noddy is shot by a crossbow bolt.

Noddy and Kim get Chinese food. When Kim orders garlic prawns, the bike drives off with her. It takes her under a bridge, throws her off, and makes advances at her. When it notices a crucifix around her neck, the bike drives back to the pub, where a member of the motorcycle gang attempts to steal it. The bike stabs the leader through the leg with a large metal spike, then launches him at some graffiti artists. The bike then proceeds to decapitate the majority of the biker gang, leaving only one member, named Roach, alive.

Noddy discovers Kim has been taken to the hospital. When he arrives, she has a hollow look in her eyes and is describing the bike's advances to the inspector. Noddy goes to a priest, who also owns a motorcycle. The two travel to the garage where Noddy's bike is kept, and at first, the priest does not believe Noddy. The bike, not wanting to be taken into the sunlight, uses its brake lever to sever the priest's fingers. Determining that the bike is a vampire, the priest decides to hold an exorcism. He gives Kim a crucifix and garlic, as he believes the bike will return for her. The priest throws a shuriken at a fly on the wall before exclaiming, "Right, let's go kick some bottom!"

The vampire bike telepathically disables the bike Noddy and the priest are riding, so they decide to call a taxi, but instead wait for a bus. It is a race against the sun to find the vampire bike before nightfall, when it will be free to roam again. During the exorcism, supernatural events occur around Noddy and the priest. Believing to have successfully vanquished the demon, the priest sprinkles the bike with holy water, which makes the bike angry. It grows spikes and turns a glowing red color.

Noddy steals a police motorcycle, dragging the policeman, who is almost run over by the vampire bike, behind him. The bike is chased by a police car, while the priest attempts to explain the situation to the authorities. Meanwhile, Kim is washed, and her garlic is removed. The bike evades the police by driving vertically down a wall and goes to the hospital to kill Kim, but not before cleaving a hospital employee in two. Kim uses her crucifix to scare the vampire bike away, so it goes after Roach, passing the priest and inspector in the corridor of the hospital. Roach crashes while fleeing and lands in a coffin.

The bike then tries to kill Noddy, but it gets its front wheel stuck on a bridge. This gives Noddy the chance to throw it in a river and spit at the bike. Thinking he is safe, Noddy has a victory cigarette, but behind him, the bike glows red underwater. Noddy then sees it and screams, running to hide in a gym. The bike finds him and starts attacking the patrons with its spikes. Noddy then bashes the bike, which feigns death, making everyone feel safe until it starts throwing people's limbs in the air. The inspector scares the bike with his smell. It manages to trap Noddy against a wall, but is stopped when Noddy turns on a sun bed. Everyone works together to force the bike into the light, and it melts. Kim asks how much Noddy really spent on the bike, and the priest says they are usually reliable. Back in Noddy's workshop, he accidentally cuts his hand. His blood drips onto the bike's old fuel tank, which springs open.

== Cast ==
- Neil Morrissey - Noddy
- Amanda Noar - Kim
- Michael Elphick - Inspector Cleaver
- Anthony Daniels - Priest
- Andrew Powell - Roach
- George Rossi - Chopper
- Daniel Peacock - Buzzer
- Midge Taylor - First Road Toad
- David Daker - Desk Sergeant
- Burt Kwouk - Fu King Owner
- Brendan Donnison - Satanist High Priest
- Graham Padden - Dorm
- Paula Ann Bland - Hospital Nurse
- Terence Budd - Bikes
- Ann Casson - Mrs. Bancroft
- Douglas Campbell - Mr. Bancroft
- Ed Devereaux - Pub Landlord
- Colin Campbell - Moped
- John Wolskel - Clyde
- Solly Assa - Victor
- Esta Charkham - Mrs. P.C. Harold

== Production ==
Filming took place in Birmingham, England. I Bought a Vampire Motorcycle was written and produced by two former Central Television film editors who developed the idea for the film following a screening of Sam Raimi's film The Evil Dead. Director Dirk Campbell stated that he "wanted the film to have the look of a serious horror movie, a dark gritty realistic look that used the decaying back streets of Birmingham, so there's nothing that jumps out at you to tell you it's a comedy".

== Release ==
I Bought a Vampire Motorcycle was released theatrical in the United Kingdom during July 1990; the film had low box office returns and grossed only £19,193 in its opening week.

== Reception ==
I Bought a Vampire Motorcycle received some criticism upon its initial release, as the film's portrayal of women resulted in it being refused a screening at the Avoriaz International Fantasy Film Festival. Nigel Floyd commented on these scenes in the film in the Monthly Film Bulletin as being "questionable" with "leering breasts, bum and crotch shots of Kim, seen from the Bike's point of view, might be overlooked as consistent with the film's adolescent tone." while stating that "there is no justification for including the scene in which the bike pursues a high heeled prostitute down a dark alley. A reviewer for the Manchester Evening News was more favorable, as they felt that the movie had the potential to become a cult classic.

Reviews written decades after its release has been more favorable. Clive Davies reviewed the film in Spinegrinder, praising its special effects and calling it "Silly and often (knowingly) corny" and that it "slowly grows on you, and is quite good fun by the final reel". In 2000, Kim Newman reviewed the movie for Empire, comparing the movie to Pete Walker's Frightmare and Norman J. Warren's Satan's Slaves and writing that it represented "a trashy but sometimes vital British horror tradition diametrically opposed to the Home Counties politeness of the Hammer Films." Jenny Trout watched the movie for the SyFy channel's website, criticizing the film's humor and noting that the movie was "bad".
