= The First Mrs. Fraser (play) =

1929 play by the Irish writer St. John Ervine

The First Mrs. Fraser is a 1929 play by the Irish writer St. John Ervine. After his second wife leaves him for somebody else, a man returns to his true love - his first wife. The play has been revived a number of times and is one of Ervine's best-known works.

== Adaptations ==
In 1932 the play was turned into a British film The First Mrs. Fraser directed by Sinclair Hill. It was followed by a 1950 television film and a 1955 German film which drew heavily on the plot. In 1967, the play was adapted for BBC radio by Cynthia Pughe.

== Bibliography ==
Oakley, Charles Allen. Where We Came In: Seventy Years of the British Film Industry. Routledge, 2013.
