= Day of Decision =

- Genre: Historical drama
- Written by: Paul Power
- Presented by: David Corbett
- Narrated by: Douglas Campbell
- Country of origin: Canada
- Original language: English
- No. of seasons: 1

Production
- Producer: Michael Rothery
- Production location: Vancouver
- Running time: 30 minutes

Original release
- Network: CBC Television
- Release: 22 February – 26 April 1959

Day of Decision is a Canadian historical drama television series that aired on CBC Television in 1959.

== Premise ==
Each episode of this Vancouver-produced series begins with a dramatic portrayal of a historical event, concluding at the point before the leading character must make a crucial decision. Then a panel discusses the circumstances of the drama and the decision involved. David Corbett was the show's moderator, with narration by Douglas Campbell.

== Scheduling ==
This half-hour series was broadcast Sundays at 3:30 p.m. (Eastern) from 22 February to 26 April 1959.
