= Saint Joan (play) =

1923 play by George Bernard Shaw

- Sybil Thorndike as Joan, 1924
- Written by: George Bernard Shaw
- Genre: Drama
- Setting: 15th-century France

Premiere
- Date: 28 December 1923
- Place: Garrick Theatre, New York

Saint Joan is a play by George Bernard Shaw about the 15th-century French military figure Joan of Arc. It is divided into six scenes and a final epilogue. It was first produced in New York in December 1923 and opened in London three months later.

Written after Joan's canonisation by the Roman Catholic Church, the play depicts her progress from peasant girl to military leader, her subsequent trial for heresy and her execution.

The central role of Joan was written for the actress Sybil Thorndike but it was Shaw's usual practice between 1920 and the mid-1930s to have his plays premiered by the Theatre Guild in New York. Winifred Lenihan was cast as Joan in the guild's production. Thorndike played the role in the London premiere three months later, and in three revivals over the next seven years.

The play reflects Shaw's belief that the people involved in Joan's trial acted according to what they thought was right.

== Background ==
Shaw's vociferous objection to Britain's entry into the First World War had made him widely unpopular, and his Heartbreak House, written in 1916–17 and staged in 1920, had been coolly received by American and British audiences. His next production, Back to Methuselah (written between 1918 and 1920), a cycle of five interrelated plays, had only a short run. Shaw felt he had exhausted his remaining creative powers in the huge span of this "Metabiological Pentateuch". He was in his late sixties and he expected to write no more plays. His interest in writing for the theatre was revived when, in May 1920, Pope Benedict XV proclaimed Joan a saint. Shaw had long found Joan an interesting historical character, and his view of her veered between "half-witted genius" and someone of "exceptional sanity". He had considered writing a play about her in 1913, and the canonisation prompted him to return to the subject. He wrote Saint Joan in the middle months of 1923.

Several models for the character of Joan have been suggested. The first was the actress Sybil Thorndike, who had been Shaw's friend since 1908. He was greatly impressed by her performance in 1922 in Shelley's The Cenci, which – as Saint Joan was to do – has a pivotal trial scene. Another model was the Fabian and suffragette activist Mary Hankinson, to whom Shaw gave a copy of Saint Joan in 1924, inscribed, "To Mary Hankinson, the only woman I know who does not believe that she was the model for Joan, and also the only woman who actually was". Another possible model, according to Shaw's biographer Stanley Weintraub, was T. E. Lawrence, a friend of the Shaws and "a man who had become in his lifetime precisely the charismatic combination of spiritual leader and undisciplined military genius that Joan of Arc had been in fifteenth-century France".

Between 1920 and 1935 it was Shaw's practice, with one exception, to have his plays premiered by the Theatre Guild in New York. Once he had agreed to let the guild give the first performances of Saint Joan, Alla Nazimova and Eva Le Gallienne were considered for the leading role, but the guild's final choice was a newcomer, Winifred Lenihan.

== Premieres ==
Saint Joan was first performed by the Theatre Guild company at the Garrick Theatre, New York, on 28 December 1923. It ran there for 215 performances. The West End premiere was at the New Theatre on 26 March 1924. It ran for 244 performances.

Cover of 1924 edition of the playscript

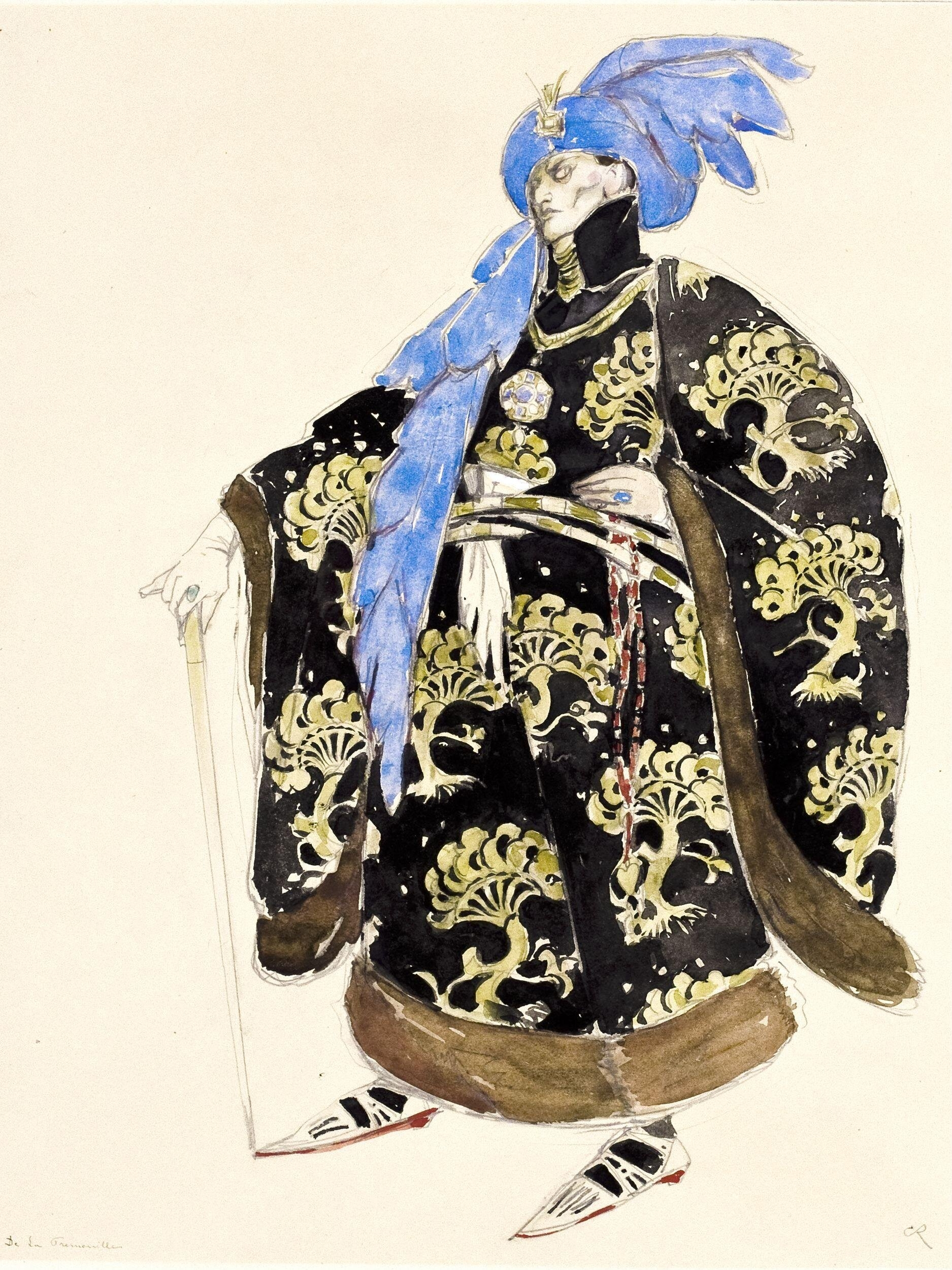
Charles Ricketts's design for Trémouille's costume, 1924

Roles, premiere casts
| Role | New York | London |
|---|---|---|
| Joan of Arc | Winifred Lenihan | Sybil Thorndike |
| Robert de Baudricourt | Ernest Cossart | Shayle Gardner |
| Steward to de Baudricourt | William M. Griffith | Francis Hope |
| Bertrand de Poulengy | Frank Tweed | Victor Lewisohn |
| Duke la Trémouille, Grand Chamberlain of France | Herbert Ashton | Bruce Winston |
| Duchesse de la Trémouille | Elizabeth Pearre | Beatrice Smith |
| Archbishop of Rheims | Albert Bruning | Robert Cunningham |
| Gilles de Rais ("Bluebeard") | Walton Butterfield | Milton Rossmer |
| Captain La Hire | Morris Carnovsky | Raymond Massey |
| Bishop of Beauvais | Ian Maclaren | Eugene Leahy |
| Dauphin, Charles VII | Philip Leigh | Ernest Thesiger |
| Earl of Warwick | A. H. Van Buren | E. Lyall Swete |
| Dunois, Bastard of Orléans | Maurice Colbourne | Robert Horton |
| Brother John Lemaître, the Inquisitor | Joseph Macaulay | O. B. Clarence |
| Brother Martin Ladvenu | Morris Carnovsky | Lawrence Anderson |
| Canon John D'Estivet | Albert Perry | Raymond Massey |
| John de Stogumber, English chaplain | Henry Travers | Lewis Casson |
| Thomas de Courcelles, Canon of Paris | Walton Butterfield | Francis Hope |
| Page to Dunois | James Norris | Jack Hawkins |
| Page to Warwick | Seth Baldwin | Sidney Bromley |
| Court Page | Jo Mielziner | — |
| Executioner | Herbert Ashton | Victor Lewisohn |
| English Soldier | Frank Tweed | Kenneth Kent |
| Gentleman | Ernest Cossart | Matthew Forsyth |

== Plot ==
Shaw characterised Saint Joan as "A Chronicle Play in 6 Scenes and an Epilogue ". Joan, a simple peasant girl, claims to experience visions of Saint Margaret, Saint Catherine, and the archangel Michael, which she says were sent by God to guide her conduct.

Scene 1 (23 February 1429): Robert de Baudricourt complains about the inability of the hens on his farm to produce eggs. Joan claims that her voices are telling her to lift the siege of Orléans, and to allow her several of his men for this purpose. Joan also says that she will crown the Dauphin in Reims Cathedral. Baudricourt ridicules Joan, but his Steward feels inspired by her words. Baudricourt eventually begins to feel the same sense of inspiration, and gives his consent to Joan. The Steward enters at the end of the scene to exclaim that the hens have begun to lay eggs again. Baudricourt interprets this as a sign from God of Joan's divine inspiration.

Scene 2 (8 March 1429): Joan talks her way into being received at the court of the weak and vain Dauphin. There, she tells him that her voices have commanded her to help him become a true king by rallying his troops to drive out the English occupiers and restore France to greatness. Joan succeeds in doing this through her excellent powers of flattery, negotiation, leadership, and skill on the battlefield.

Scene 3 (29 April 1429): Dunois and his page are waiting for the wind to turn so that he and his forces can lift the Siege of Orléans. Joan and Dunois commiserate, and Dunois attempts to explain to her more pragmatic realities of an attack, without the wind at their back. Her replies eventually inspire Dunois to rally the forces, and at the scene's end, the wind turns in their favour.

Scene 4 (June 1429): Warwick and Stogumber discuss Joan's stunning series of victories. Joined by the Bishop of Beauvais, they are at a loss to explain her success. Stogumber decides Joan is a witch. Beauvais sees Joan as a threat to the Church, as she claims to receive instructions from God directly. He fears she wants to instil national pride in the people, which would undermine the Church's universal rule. Warwick thinks she wants to create a system in which the king is responsible to God only, ultimately stripping him and other feudal lords of their power. All agree that she must die.

Dunois (Robert Horton) and Joan (Sybil Thorndike) in Reims Cathedral

Scene 5 (17 July 1429): the Dauphin is crowned Charles VII at Reims Cathedral. A perplexed Joan asks Dunois why she is so unpopular at court. He explains that she has exposed very important people as incompetent and irrelevant. She talks to Dunois, Bluebeard, and La Hire about returning home. Charles, who complains about the weight of his coronation robes and smell of the holy oil, is pleased to hear this. She then says to Dunois "Before I go home, let's take Paris", an idea which horrifies Charles, who wants to negotiate a peace immediately. The Archbishop berates her for her "sin of pride". Dunois warns her that if she is captured on a campaign he deems foolhardy, no one will ransom or rescue her. Now realising that she is "alone on earth", Joan declares that she will gain the strength to do what she must from the people and from God. She leaves, leaving the men dumbfounded.

Scene 6 (30 May 1431): deals with her trial. Stogumber is adamant that she be executed at once. The Inquisitor, the Bishop of Beauvais, and the Church officials on both sides of the trial have a long discussion on the nature of her heresy. Joan is brought to the court, and continues to assert that her voices speak to her directly from God and that she has no need of the Church's officials. This outrages Stogumber. She does not acquiesce to the pressure of torture, but is finally convinced her visions have betrayed her once the court tells her they are ready to execute her at a moment's notice. She agrees to sign a confession relinquishing the truth behind her voices. When she learns she will be imprisoned for life without hope of parole, she renounces her confession:

Joan: "You think that life is nothing but not being dead? It is not the bread and water I fear. I can live on bread. It is no hardship to drink water if the water be clean. But to shut me from the light of the sky and the sight of the fields and flowers; to chain my feet so that I can never again climb the hills. To make me breathe foul damp darkness, without these things I cannot live. And by your wanting to take them away from me, or from any human creature, I know that your council is of the devil".

Joan accepts death at the stake as preferable to such an imprisoned existence. Stogumber vehemently demands that Joan then be taken to the stake for immediate execution. The Inquisitor and the Bishop of Beauvais excommunicate her and deliver her into the hands of the English. The Inquisitor asserts that Joan was fundamentally innocent, in the sense that she was sincere and had no understanding of the church and the law. Stogumber re-enters, screaming and severely shaken emotionally after seeing Joan die in the flames, the first time that he has witnessed such a death, and realising that he has not understood what it means to burn a person until he has actually seen it happen. A soldier had given Joan two sticks tied together in a cross before the moment of her death. Bishop Martin Ladvenu also reports that when he approached with a crucifix to let her see it before she died, and he approached too close to the flames, she warned him of the danger from the stake, which convinced him that she could not have been under the inspiration of the devil.

Epilogue: 25 years after Joan's execution, a retrial has cleared her of heresy. Brother Martin brings the news to Charles VII. Charles then has a dream in which Joan appears to him. She begins conversing cheerfully not only with Charles, but with her old enemies, who also materialise in the King's bedroom. The visitors include the English soldier who gave her a cross. Because of this act, he receives a day off from Hell on the anniversary of Joan's death. An emissary from the present day (the 1920s) brings news that the Catholic Church is to canonise her. Joan says that saints can work miracles, and asks if she can be resurrected. At this, all the characters desert her one by one, asserting that the world is not prepared to receive a saint such as her. The last to leave is the English soldier, who is about to engage in a conversation with Joan before he is summoned back to Hell at the end of his 24-hour respite. The play ends with Joan ultimately despairing that mankind will never accept its saints:

O God that madest this beautiful earth, when will it be ready to accept thy saints? How long, O Lord, how long?

== Themes ==
Shaw wrote in his preface to the play:

There are no villains in the piece. Crime, like disease, is not interesting: it is something to be done away with by general consent, and that is all [there is] about it. It is what men do at their best, with good intentions, and what normal men and women find that they must and will do in spite of their intentions, that really concern us.

Shaw described the play as "Tragedy not Melodrama"; his biographer Michael Holroyd has characterised it as "a tragedy without villains". Other commentators have differed about whether the play is a tragedy at all. According to Eric Bentley, Shaw attempts "a tragic conflict – that is, an irreconcilable conflict". Louis L. Martz and Hans Stoppel have argued that Shaw failed to create a tragic protagonist along classical lines because he did not establish the responsibility for Joan's fall as primarily her own: "Joan's destiny is not wrecked by a tragic flaw, by 'hubris' but because she and [her accusers] are only human beings, and in these Shaw had lost his absolute faith". Sylvan Barnet went further and asserted that Shaw was incapable of writing tragedy.

== Criticism ==
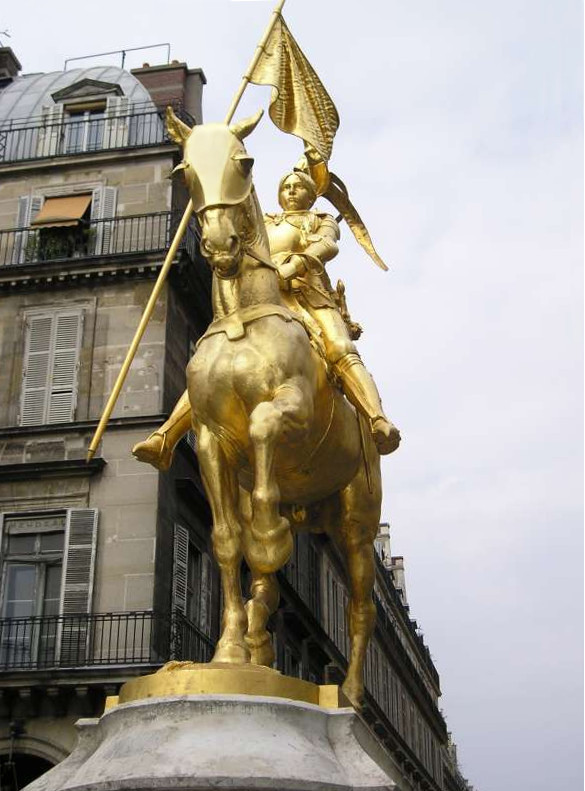
Jeanne d'Arc statue at Place des Pyramides, Paris by Emmanuel Frémiet, 1874

After the British premiere the journalist J. M. Robertson reacted to the play by arguing that it was highly inaccurate, especially in its depiction of medieval society. The Stage commented that Shaw:

has shown himself, in a new light, such a passionate stickler for historical accuracy as to make all the more lamentable the copious introduction into the dialogue of ill-chosen examples of vulgar colloquialisms and modern slang that grievously mar and indeed spoil to a large extent a work boldly planned and executed, and informed with a nobility of thought and purpose.

The Times, despite rating the play as "one of Mr Shaw's finest achievements", thought it "a nuisance that he is so obsessed with the present moment as to drag it into every period, however remote, that he dramatizes".

The critic Herman Klein suggested that the play should be turned into an opera, especially if Edward Elgar could be induced to write the music. Frederick S. Boas compared the different treatments of Joan in dramas by Shakespeare (Henry VI, Part 1), Schiller (The Maid of Orleans), and Shaw.

T. S. Eliot, discussing the play after its premiere in London in 1924, wrote that although Saint Joan was not the masterpiece that some claimed it to be, the play "seems to illustrate Mr. Shaw's mind more clearly than anything he has written before". And although he credited Shaw with providing an "intellectual stimulant" and "dramatic delight", he took issue with his portrayal of the heroine: "his Joan of Arc is perhaps the greatest sacrilege of all Joans: for instead of the saint or the strumpet of the legends to which he objects, he has turned her into a great middle-class reformer, and her place is a little higher than Mrs. Pankhurst" (the militant leader of the British suffragettes).

More general interpretation of Joan's character is to describe her as a rebel against general institutional authority, such as that of the Catholic Church and the feudal system. Recent comments have noted her particularly strong form of religious belief and how it borders on religious fanaticism.

== Revivals ==
Ludmilla Pitoëff as Joan

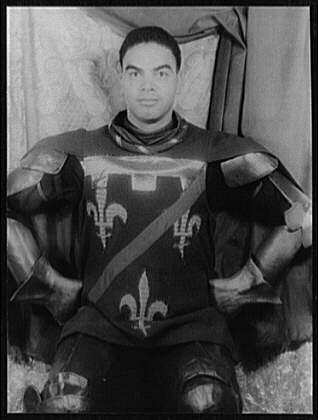
Earle Hyman as Dunois, 1956

| Year | Theatre | Joan | Ref |
|---|---|---|---|
| 1925 | Regent Theatre, London | Sybil Thorndike | |
| 1925 | Théâtre des Arts, Paris (in French, as Saint Jeanne) | Ludmilla Pitoëff | |
| 1926 | Lyceum Theatre, London | Sybil Thorndike | |
| 1930 | Globe Theatre, London (in French, as Saint Jeanne) | Ludmilla Pitoëff | |
| 1931 | His Majesty's Theatre, London | Sybil Thorndike | |
| 1934 | The Old Vic, London | Mary Newcomb | |
| 1936 | Martin Beck Theatre, New York | Katharine Cornell | |
| 1936 | Malvern Festival, Malvern (honouring Shaw's 80th birthday) | Wendy Hiller | |
| 1938 | Malvern Festival | Elisabeth Bergner | |
| 1939 | Streatham Hill Theatre, London (Old Vic company) | Constance Cummings | |
| 1947 | New Theatre (Old Vic company) | Celia Johnson | |
| 1951 | Cort Theatre, New York | Uta Hagen | |
| 1954 | Arts Theatre and then St Martin's Theatre, London | Siobhán McKenna | |
| 1956 | Phoenix Theatre, New York | Siobhán McKenna | |
| 1960 | Old Vic | Barbara Jefford | |
| 1962 | New York City Center Theatre | Barbara Jefford | |
| 1963 | Old Vic (National Theatre Company) | Joan Plowright | |
| 1968 | Vivian Beaumont Theater, Lincoln Center, New York | Diana Sands | |
| 1970 | Mermaid Theatre, London | Angela Pleasence | |
| 1978 | Circle in the Square Theatre, New York | Lynn Redgrave | |
| 1984 | National Theatre, London | Frances de la Tour | |
| 1994 | Strand Theatre, London | Imogen Stubbs | |
| 2007 | National Theatre, London | Anne-Marie Duff | |
| 2016 | Donmar Warehouse, London | Gemma Arterton | |
| 2018 | Manhattan Theatre Club, New York | Condola Rashad | |
| 2026 | Citizens Theatre, Glasgow | Mandipa Kabanda | |

== Adaptations ==
=== Film ===
- In 1927 Lee de Forest filmed Thorndike and Casson in the cathedral scene from Saint Joan in a short film made in his Phonofilm sound-on-film process.
- In 1957 the play was adapted for film by Graham Greene, directed by Otto Preminger, with Jean Seberg as Joan of Arc, Richard Widmark, Richard Todd, and John Gielgud.

=== Radio ===
BBC Radio has broadcast five adaptations of the play:

- 1941: Constance Cummings as Joan.
- 1956: Mary Morris as Joan.
- 1965: Joan Plowright as Joan.
- 1975: Judi Dench as Joan.
- 2011: Lyndsey Marshal as Joan.

In 1967 BBC Radio broadcast four scenes from the play, chosen by and starring Sybil Thorndike.

=== Television ===
There have been four adaptations for BBC Television:

- 1946: Ann Casson as Joan.
- 1951: Constance Cummings as Joan.
- 1968: Janet Suzman as Joan.
- 1979: Gabrielle Lloyd as Joan.

In 1967, a Hallmark Hall of Fame production on American television starred Geneviève Bujold as Joan.

=== Opera ===
The play has been adapted into an opera by the composer Tom Owen.

== Awards and nominations ==
=== 1977 Broadway revival ===
| Year | Award | Category | Nominee | Result |
|---|---|---|---|---|
| 1978 | Drama Desk Award | Outstanding Costume Design | Zack Brown | Nominated |

=== 1993 Broadway revival ===
| Year | Award | Category | Nominee | Result |
|---|---|---|---|---|
| 1993 | Tony Award | Best Revival | | Nominated |

=== 2018 Broadway revival ===
| Year | Award | Category | Nominee | Result |
|---|---|---|---|---|
| 2018 | Tony Awards | Best Actress in a Play | Condola Rashad | Nominated |

== See also ==
- Cultural depictions of Joan of Arc
