= Lewis Casson =

English actor and theatre director (1875–1969)

Sir Lewis Casson MC
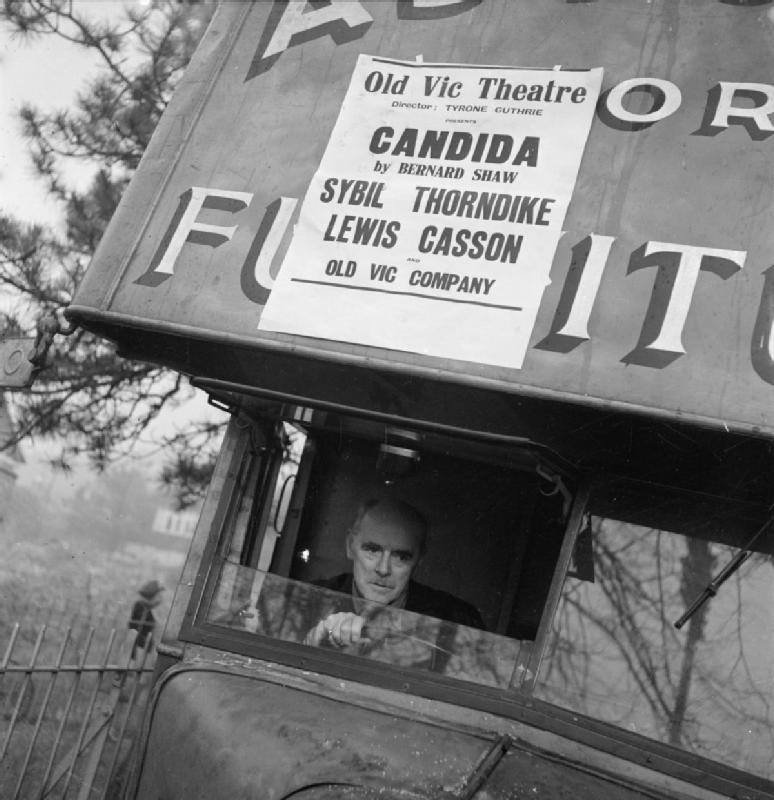
- Casson in 1941
- Born: Lewis Thomas Casson; 26 October 1875; Birkenhead, Cheshire, England
- Died: 16 May 1969 (aged 93)
- Resting place: Golders Green Crematorium
- Education: Ruthin School; St Mark's College
- Occupations: Actor, theatre director
- Spouse: Sybil Thorndike (m. 1908)
- Children: John Casson; Christopher Casson; Mary Casson; Ann Casson
- Relatives: Benedict Campbell (grandson)

Sir Lewis Thomas Casson (26 October 1875 – 16 May 1969) was an English actor and theatre director, and the husband of actress Dame Sybil Thorndike.

== Early life ==
Lewis Casson was born at 18 Alfred Road, Birkenhead, Cheshire, the third of the seven children of Laura Ann née Holland-Thomas (1843–1912) and Thomas Casson (1843–1911), a bank manager and organ-builder. Both his parents were Welsh. When he was young the family moved to Denbigh in Wales and Casson was educated at Ruthin School. In 1891 Casson's father decided to make a business of his hobby of building organs, and the family moved to London. Casson soon began working in his father's business. When this failed, he began studying chemistry, but then trained as a teacher at St Mark's College, Chelsea, where he gained a teaching certificate. In 1900 Casson's father began another organ making business and Lewis worked in this for the next four years.

== Acting career ==
Casson had always been interested in acting and had taken part in amateur productions in his youth. He continued to act semi-professionally until 1904, when he left his father's business to work as a professional actor. He joined the Royal Court Theatre under Harley Granville-Barker and remained there until 1908, when he joined a repertory company founded by Annie Horniman at the Gaiety Theatre in Manchester, the first repertory theatre in the country.

On 22 December 1908, in Aylesford, Kent, he married Sybil Thorndike, who was another member of the company. They both joined Charles Frohman's repertory season in London. In 1909 Sybil gave birth to their first son, John, and soon after, they joined Frohman on a tour of the United States. When Casson returned to England he became a theatrical director working with Annie Horniman from 1911 to 1913. He then succeeded Alfred Wareing as the producer of the Scottish Playgoers Company, based in Glasgow, and forerunner of the Citizens' Theatre, in which his elder son John would become an actor-director. In 1912, a second son, Christopher, was born.

== World War I ==
At the outbreak of World War I, Casson joined the Royal Army Service Corps. He later joined the Royal Engineers reaching the rank of major. He was invalided home in 1917 after being wounded, and was awarded the Military Cross. During the war, Sybil Thorndike gave birth to their final two children: Mary (born 1914) and Ann (born 1915).

== Post-war career ==
Following the war, Casson resumed his career as a theatrical director. At this point, his wife Sybil, was becoming increasingly well known as an actress, and Casson supported her in her career. He directed his wife in Saint Joan. He also directed productions of The Trojan Women and Medea, written by Euripides and translated by Gilbert Murray, and in 1925 he directed Henry VIII and directed Macbeth in 1926. Casson and Thorndike toured South Africa in 1928 and the Middle East, Australia and New Zealand in 1932. In 1934 he appeared in John Van Druten's Flowers of the Forest. In 1938 Casson directed Henry V for Ivor Novello. In 1939 he led an Old Vic tour around the Mediterranean, and in 1940 he directed John Gielgud in King Lear at the Old Vic. He played Gonzalo in The Tempest, that tale of a son missing at sea, while his own son was for a time missing off the Norwegian coast.

During World War II Casson organised tours of the Old Vic company to the South Wales valleys. He was president of the British Actors' Equity Association from 1941 to 1945, and was knighted in 1945. As Thorndike had been created a dame in 1931, they were one of the few couples who both held titles in their own right.

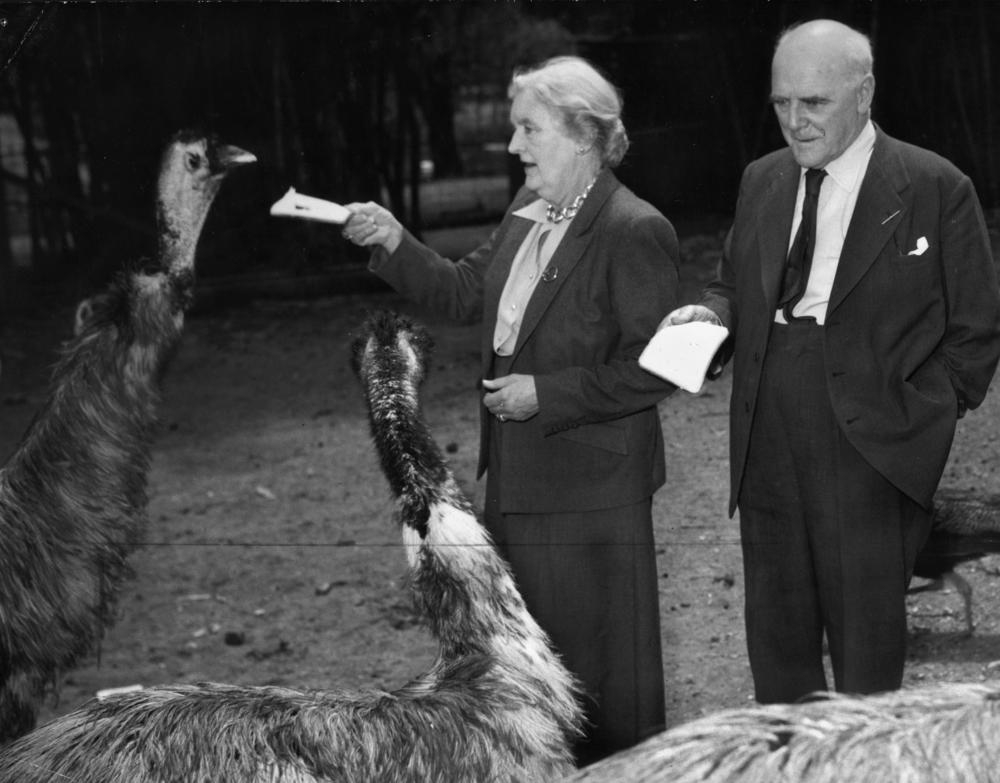
Casson with wife in Australia in 1954

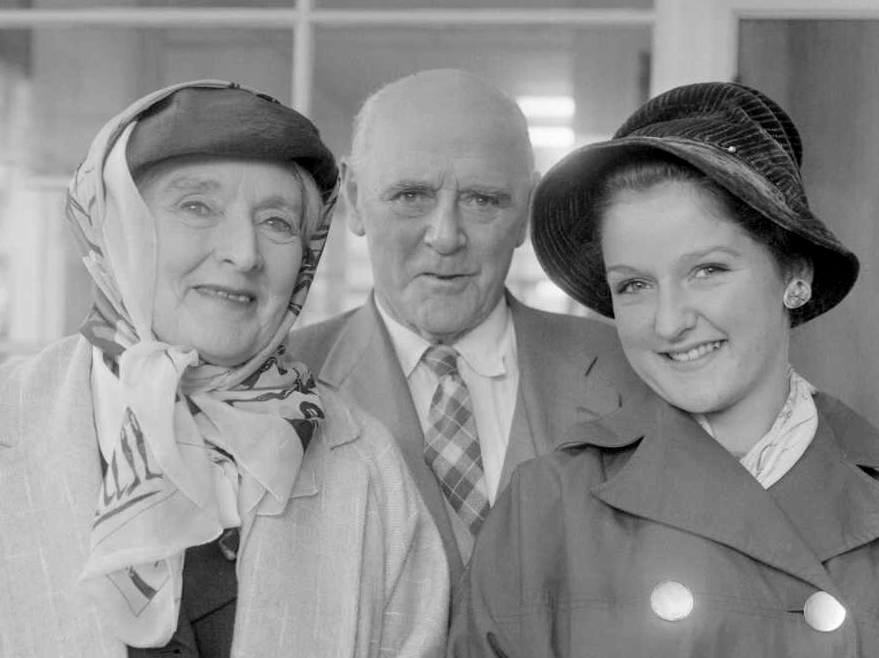
Casson with wife Sybil and granddaughter Laura Jane in 1958

In 1947, Casson was successful in the leading role in J.B. Priestley's The Linden Tree. In 1959, Casson and Thorndike celebrated the golden jubilee of their wedding by appearing together in Clemence Dane's play, specially written for them, Eighty in the Shade. That same year they both appeared in the film Shake Hands with the Devil as ill-fated loyalists in Ireland.

== Later life ==
Casson took part in a number of national and international recital tours with his wife. He continued to work until 1968, his last appearance being in Night Must Fall by Emlyn Williams. He died at Nuffield Nursing Home on 16 May 1969, aged 93. He was cremated at Golders Green Crematorium on 20 May 1969. His ashes were scattered in the grounds.

His widow Sybil died seven years later, in 1976, aged 93.

== Selected filmography ==
- Escape (1930)
- Crime on the Hill (1933)
- The Night Club Queen (1934)
- Midshipman Easy (1935)
- Calling the Tune (1936)
- South Riding (1938)
- Shake Hands with the Devil (1959)
