= Jane Clegg =

1913 play by John Ervine

Jane Clegg is a 1913 play by the Irish playwright St John Ervine. A feminist work in the social realism genre, Jane Clegg revolves around the eponymous housewife, who tends to her lower-middle-class family while her feckless husband runs up gambling debts and indulges in illicit affairs. First staged at the Gaiety Theatre in Manchester in 1913, the play was very popular in the first half of the 20th century, and was staged multiple times in London and New York. It was one of the key roles in the theatrical career of the actress Sybil Thorndike. After 75 years, Jane Clegg was revived at the Finborough Theatre in 2019 and received critical acclaim.

== See also ==
- Suffragette movement
- Social realism
