= St. John Greer Ervine =

Irish writer, dramatist and theatre manager (1883–1971)

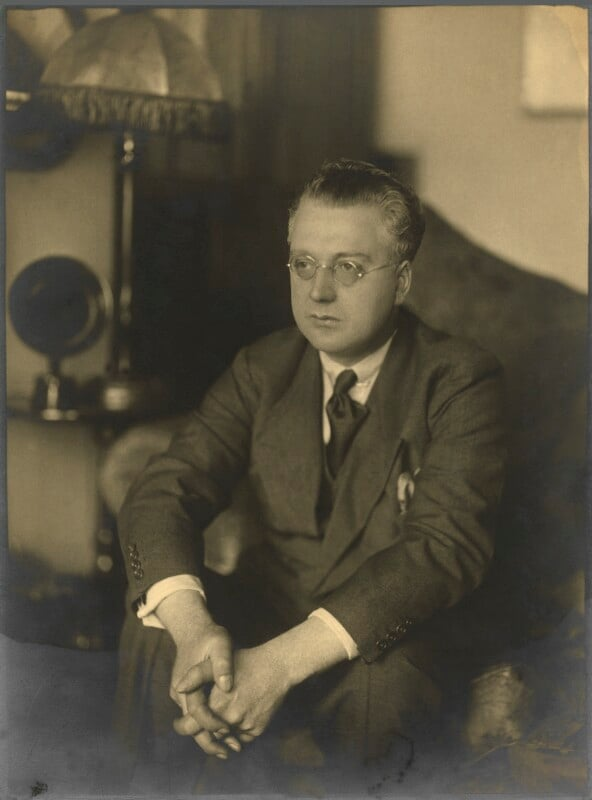
Ervine, 1931–32

St John Greer Ervine (28 December 1883 – 24 January 1971) was an Irish biographer, novelist, critic, dramatist, and theatre manager. He was the most prominent Ulster writer of the early twentieth century and a major Irish dramatist whose work influenced the plays of W. B. Yeats and Sean O'Casey. The Wayward Man was among the first novels to explore the character, and conflicts, of Belfast.

== Biography ==
Ervine was born as John Greer Irvine in Ballymacarrett in east Belfast, in the shadow of the shipyards, to deaf-mute parents. Every member of his family had been born in County Down for 300 years. His father, a printer, died soon after his birth and the family moved in with Ervine's grandmother who ran a small shop. Ervine became an insurance clerk in a Belfast office at the age of 17 and shortly after he moved to London.

In London Ervine met George Bernard Shaw and began to write journalism as well as his first plays, adopting the name St John Ervine "as more fitting for his ambitions". His first full-length play, Mixed Marriage, was produced by Dublin's Abbey Theatre in 1911. It had several runs as one of the Abbey's most profitable plays. Yeats praised Ervine's plays for depicting the real life experienced by the people of the north of Ireland as Synge's work had done for those of the west of Ireland.

In June 1913, Ervine was standing beside Emily Davison at The Derby and witnessed her being fatally injured by King George V's horse.

In 1915 Yeats appointed Ervine as the Abbey's general manager. Ervine's tenure was a commercial success. The production of several successful comedies restored the theatre's finances. But Ervine's demands on the actors, combined with his outrage at the Easter Rising of 1916, led to open conflict. Ervine resigned from the Abbey in 1916 and enlisted in the Household Battalion. On 1 January 1917 he was commissioned as a temporary second lieutenant in the second reserve of the Royal Dublin Fusiliers, and was transferred to a regular battalion on 1 August 1917. After being wounded in Flanders one of his legs had to be amputated. He was promoted to lieutenant on 1 February 1919 and relinquished his commission due to his wounds on 5 December 1919.

Through the 1920s and 1930s Ervine wrote drawing-room comedies that were box-office successes. Several had West End runs of up to two years, among them Anthony and Anna (1926) and The First Mrs. Fraser (1929). In 1936 Ervine's Boyd's Shop, "the play that defined Northern Irish drama for decades", was produced. Arnold Bennett hailed him as a playwright "unequalled" in England, with plays that "combined great skill, fine ideals, and perfect sincerity with immense popular success". From 1919 to 1939 Ervine was also a theatre reviewer for The Observer.

Alongside his plays Ervine wrote a number of novels. Of these the most successful, The Wayward Man (1927), was reprinted in 1936 as one of Allen Lane's first Penguin paperbacks (Penguin 32). He also produced several major biographies, including of the Unionist leaders Craigavon and Carson, of William Booth, of Oscar Wilde and of George Bernard Shaw. Bernard Shaw: His Life, Work, and Friends (1956) was awarded the James Tait Black Memorial Prize in 1956.

Explaining the determination of his character Robert "Darkie" Dunwoody in his novel, The Wayward Man, to leave the city despite the ties that bind him, Ervine wrote "I have never met anyone who was not depressed by Belfast". Sean O'Faolain accounted Ervine "the only Belfast writer who has tried at all to bottle the 'realism' of the city". He suggested, however, that, "lacking poetry", Ervine "only succeeded in making it taste like reboiled mutton gone cold".

As "part of what might be called a programme for the reinstatement of certain neglected Northern Irish novelists", The Wayward Man was republished in 2014. Patricia Craig proposes that it is an exemplar of "a kind of Edwardian realism nurtured in the shade of Arnold Bennett and John Galsworthy, and embodying a distinctive Ulster Protestant strain".

By the 1940s St John Ervine was Northern Ireland's leading writer but also a controversial figure with "a remarkable antipathy to southern Ireland".

== Personal life ==
In 1911 Ervine married Leonora Mary Davis (died 1965), a teacher, actress and playwright from Birmingham. They settled in Seaton, Devon in the 1940s.

In 1929, Ervine published an opinion piece in the New York Times stating that the 'decline of theater' was due in large part to women, and that women over the age of 40 should refrain from going to the theater more than twice a year."

Ervine died on 24 January 1971 in Fitzhall, Iping, Sussex.

== Selected plays ==
- Mixed Marriage (1910)
- The Magnanimous Lover (1912)
- The Critics (1913)
- Jane Clegg (1913)
- The Orangeman (1914)
- John Ferguson (1915)
- The Island of Saints and How to Get Out of It (1920)
- The Ship (1922)
- The Lady of Belmont (1924), a sequel to The Merchant of Venice.
- The First Mrs. Fraser (1929)
- Boyd's Shop (1936)
- William John Mawhinny (1940)
- Friends and Relations (1941)
- My Brother Tom (1952)
- Ballyfarland's Festival (1953)
- Martha (1955)

A contemporary production of Mixed Marriage played at the Finborough Theatre in London from 4 to 29 October 2011, to critical acclaim. The Finborough Theatre subsequently produced John Ferguson in 2014, and Jane Clegg in 2019.

== Novels ==
- The Tailor of Charing Cross (1912)
- Mrs Martin's Man (1914)
- Alice and a Family (1915)
- Changing Winds (1917)
- The Foolish Lovers (1920)
- The Wayward Man (1927) (2014, Turnpike Books, Dublin. ISBN 978-0957233614)

== See also ==
- List of Northern Irish writers
