= Christopher Casson =

Irish actor (1912–1996)

Christopher T. Casson (20 March 1912 – 9 July 1996) was an English-born actor who became a citizen of Ireland in 1946. His work included stage, screen, radio and television roles. His portrayal of a Church of Ireland canon in the long-running series The Riordans made him known nationwide.

== Life and work ==
He was born in Prestwich, Lancashire, the youngest son of actors Sybil Thorndike and Lewis Casson. He made his stage debut at age three in Julius Caesar at the Old Vic.

After a brief naval career he enrolled at the Central School of Dramatic Art at the Royal Albert Hall. He began his professional career in 1930. He toured Egypt, Palestine, Australia and New Zealand during the 1930s.

In 1938 he joined the Hilton Edwards and Micheál Mac Liammóir company at the Gate Theatre in Dublin. He married the Irish stage designer and artist Kay O'Connell in 1941, with Mac Liammóir as his best man. They had two daughters. He became a Roman Catholic in 1946. He worked with Longford Productions until 1950, when he became a freelance actor.

Casson achieved national fame with his portrayal of Canon Browne in The Riordans. He also had parts in The Irish RM, Autumn Sunshine and Strangers and Brothers. His film credits included Captain Lightfoot (1955), Shake Hands with the Devil (1959), Broth of a Boy (1959), The Siege of Sidney Street (1960), Johnny Nobody (1961), Zardoz (1974), The Sleep of Death (1980), Educating Rita (1983), Attracta (1983), The Treaty (1991) and Frankie Starlight (1995).

He was part of a Jacob's Award winning production in 1982, as a member of the RTÉ Players, when he acted the part of Virag in RTÉ Radio's unabridged, 30-hour, marathon broadcast of James Joyce's novel, Ulysses.

He was an accomplished harpist and ballad-singer. He lived in the coastal Dublin suburb of Sandymount.

== Filmography ==
Year	Title	Role	Notes
1959	Captain Lightfoot	Lord Clonmell	
1959	Broth of a Boy	Mr. Justice Healy	
1959	Shake Hands with the Devil	Brigadier	
1960	The Siege of Sidney Street	Police Commissioner	
1961	Johnny Nobody	Father Bernard	
1962	The Devil's Agent	Headmaster	Uncredited
1974	Zardoz	Old Scientist	
1980	The Sleep of Death	Sir Philip Terence	
1983	Educating Rita	Professor	
1983	Attracta	Mr. Jameson	
1984	Strangers and Brothers	Austin Davidson	2 episodes
1991	The Treaty	Lord French	
1995	Frankie Starlight	Bookshop Gentleman	
