= Jonathan Croall =

British author and journalist (born 1941)

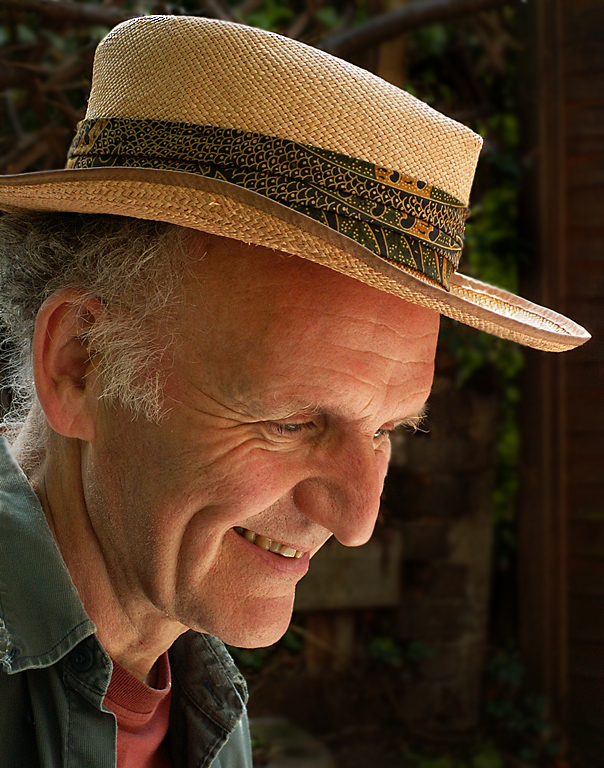
- Born: 19 August 1941 (age 85)
- Occupations: Journalist and author
- Writing career
- Genres: Theatre history, biography

Jonathan Croall (born 19 August 1941) is a British author and journalist.

== Life and career ==
Croall was born on 19 August 1941 and brought up in Battersea in south London: his father was the film and stage actor John Stuart, his mother the actress, teacher and voice coach Barbara Francis. He was educated at St Christopher School, a progressive school in Letchworth, Hertfordshire (1949–1959), and at St John's College, Cambridge, where he studied English literature and modern languages (1960–1963).

After teaching English at the Lycée Jean-Baptiste-Say in Paris, he worked as an editor in publishing with Cassell, Penguin, Oxford University Press, and Writers and Readers; later he was managing editor of Bedford Square Press.

He subsequently worked as an editor and a journalist in newspapers and magazines. He was successively features editor of the Times Educational Supplement; co-founder and editor of Arts Express magazine; editor of StageWrite, the magazine of the National Theatre; and programme editor at the Old Vic theatre. During this time, he wrote about education, the arts, health, history, and the environment for The Guardian, the Daily Telegraph, the Sunday Times, New Society and Vole magazine.

He is the author of twenty books, most notably biographies of AS Neill, John Gielgud and Sybil Thorndike, and books about productions of Hamlet, Bacchai and Mother Clap's Molly House at the National Theatre in Britain. The Coming of Godot: A Short History of a Masterpiece was nominated for the 2005 Theatre Book Prize. He adapted and directed for the stage his oral history Don't You Know There's a War On? His children's novel Sent Away was based on the true story of the child migrant scandal. His latest work is Forgotten Stars: My Father and the British Silent Film World.

His eldest son Ben Croall is a music journalist who writes under the name Carl Loben; his youngest son Julius Croall is a musician and guitar teacher. His partner is the playwright Lesley Bruce.

== Publications ==
- Performing Hamlet: Actors in the Modern Age, London: Bloomsbury Publishing 2018 ISBN 978-1-350-03076-3
- Editor, This Once Was Us: The Life and Death of Penguin Education, Penguin Collectors Society 2018 ISBN 978-0-9931106-8-9
- Performing King Lear: Gielgud to Russell Beale. London: Bloomsbury Publishing. 2015. ISBN 978-1-4742-2385-0.
- Closely Observed Theatre: From the National to the Old Vic. London: Fantom Publishing. 2014. ISBN 978-1-78196-117-9.
- In Search of Gielgud: A Biographer's Tale. London: Herbert Adler. 2014. ISBN 978-1-84289-022-6.
- Forgotten Stars: My Father and the British Silent Film World. London: Fantom Publishing. 2013. ISBN 978-1-781960-91-2.
- Gielgoodies! The Wit and Wisdom (& Gaffes) of John Gielgud. London: Oberon Books. 2012. ISBN 978-1-844138-08-1.
- John Gielgud: Matinee Idol to Movie Star. London: Methuen Drama. 2011. ISBN 978-1-408131-06-0.
- Sybil Thorndike: A Star Of Life. London: Haus Publishing. 2008. ISBN 978-1-905791-92-7.
- Buzz Buzz! Playwrights, Actors and Directors at the National Theatre. London: Methuen. 2008. ISBN 978-1-408105-20-7.
- Peter Hall's "Bacchai": The National Theatre at Work. London: Oberon Books. 2008. ISBN 978-1-840028-17-1. (with foreword by Peter Hall)
- Don't You Know There's a War On?: Voices from the Home Front. Stroud: The History Press Ltd. 2006. ISBN 978-0-7509-3699-6.
- The Coming of Godot: A Short History of a Masterpiece. London: Oberon Books. 2005. ISBN 978-1-840025-95-8. (preface by Peter Hall)
- Gielgud: A Theatrical Life. London: Methuen. 2002. ISBN 978-0-826414-03-8.
- Hamlet Observed: The National Theatre at Work. London: Royal National Theatre Publications. 2001. ISBN 978-0-951994-34-4.
- Inside the Molly House: The National Theatre at Work. London: Royal National Theatre Publications. 2001. ISBN 978-0-951994-37-5.
- LETS Act Locally: The Growth of Local Exchange Trading Systems. London: Gulbenkian Foundation. 1997. ISBN 978-0-192716-57-6.
- Preserve or Destroy: Tourism and the Environment. London: Gulbenkian Foundation. 1995. ISBN 978-0-192716-57-6.
- Helping to Heal: The Arts in Health Care. London: Gulbenkian Foundation. 1993. ISBN 978-0-192716-57-6.
- Dig for History: Active Learning across the Curriculum. Crediton: Southgate. 1992. ISBN 978-0-192716-57-6.
- Sent Away. Oxford: Oxford University Press. 1992. ISBN 978-0-192716-57-6.
- All the Best, Neill: Letters from Summerhill. London: Andre Deutsch Ltd. 1983. ISBN 978-0-233975-94-8.
- Neill of Summerhill: The Permanent Rebel. London: Routledge & Kegan Paul. 1983. ISBN 978-0-710093-00-4.
- The Parents’ Day School Book. London: Panther. 1978. ISBN 978-0-586046-73-9.
- Don’t Shoot the Goalkeeper. London: Oxford University Press. 1976. ISBN 978-0-199132-32-4.
