= List of I, Claudius episodes =

I, Claudius is a 1976 BBC Television adaptation of Robert Graves' I, Claudius and Claudius the God. Written by Jack Pulman, it was one of the corporation's most successful drama serials of all time. It also provided popular initial exposure for several actors who would eventually become well known, such as Derek Jacobi, Patrick Stewart, John Rhys-Davies and John Hurt.

== Episodes ==
The BBC broadcast and home media releases present the series in 12 parts, with the initial double-length episode titled "A Touch of Murder". When aired on the PBS anthology series Masterpiece Theatre in the US the series consisted of 13 episodes, with alternative linking scenes shown at the end of "A Touch of Murder" and the beginning of "Family Affairs".

No.	Title	Original release date
1a	"A Touch of Murder"	20 September 1976
Rome, AD 54. Knowing that he will soon be assassinated, the Roman Emperor Claudius begins a secret history of his family, planning for it to be found long after he is dead. He begins his tale eighty years earlier, in 24 BC, as the newly enthroned Emperor Augustus begins to favour his nephew and son-in-law Marcellus over his old friend and ally Agrippa. After Marcellus insults Agrippa at a banquet honouring his victory at the Battle of Actium, he leaves Rome in protest. Augustus' wife Livia wants her elder son Tiberius to become Augustus' heir, so she secretly poisons Marcellus, who eventually dies. Augustus has Agrippa return to Rome. To seal their renewed friendship, he gives his daughter Julia, Marcellus' widow, to Agrippa to be his wife, infuriating Livia, who wanted Julia to marry Tiberius to cement his status as Augustus' heir.
1b	"Family Affairs"	20 September 1976
Rome, 9–8 BC. Twelve years have passed. Agrippa is dead and Tiberius has been forced to divorce his wife Vipsania Agrippina and marry Julia. Still deeply in love, he continues to meet Vipsania secretly, enraging Augustus, but Livia defends him, claiming that Tiberius had informed her of the meetings. Tiberius is briefly comforted when his brother Drusus visits, before he returns to Germania on campaign. Drusus writes to Tiberius, asking for his help in persuading Augustus to retire and return Rome to a Republic, but the letter is intercepted and read by both Livia and Augustus. Augustus dismisses the letter as youthful impetuousness, but Livia is clearly troubled. Drusus' leg is crushed in a fall from his horse, and his condition worsens under the care of Livia's personal physician. He dies in the presence of his wife, Antonia, and their recently born son Claudius, leaving Tiberius heartbroken. A year later, a drunken Julia enrages Tiberius with taunts about Vipsania, and he strikes her across the face, resulting in his banishment from Rome. Augustus looks forward to sharing his power with his grandsons Lucius and Gaius when they come of age, but Livia is already planning ahead.
2	"Waiting in the Wings"	27 September 1976
Rome, AD 3–5. Gaius has died and Tiberius has been banished to Rhodes for his mistreatment of Julia, who in his absence has a series of hedonistic affairs and orgies. One day in the garden, the boy Claudius catches a wolf cub dropped from an eagle's claws, leading a seer to predict that he will protect Rome in an hour of need. Livia, knowing of the mutual attraction between Claudius's sister Livilla and Julia's son Postumus Agrippa, arranges their betrothal to other people; she enlists Lucius's friend Plautius as a spy against Julia, and tricks Lucius into revealing Julia's promiscuity. A grief-stricken Augustus banishes her from Rome. The death of Lucius in a boating accident (implied to be caused by Plautius on Livia's orders) ends Tiberius's exile, and he returns to Rome to be named, along with Julia's surviving son Postumus, as co-heir to Augustus' throne.
3	"What Shall We Do About Claudius?"	4 October 1976
Rome, AD 9. Three Roman legions have been massacred in Germania at the Battle of the Teutoburg Forest. Tiberius and his nephew Germanicus are dispatched to exact revenge. While teenage Claudius is in the library researching his family's history, he is advised by the historian Pollio to play up his limp and his stutter to enhance his image as a harmless fool who is no threat to anyone. Augustus has determined that Postumus will succeed him as Emperor, but Livia overhears this. She tells Livilla that she knows of her affair with Postumus and that a single ruler is needed to avoid a civil war caused by a disputed succession. With Livilla's help, Postumus is framed for rape. Postumus tells Augustus that Livia has been killing those who could prevent Tiberius succeeding, but he is not believed. Before he is banished, Postumus tells Claudius of all the people whom he suspects Livia has killed, and reiterates the advice that Claudius should continue to play the fool. The episode ends with Claudius' marriage to Plautia Urgulanilla, who is so much taller than him that he becomes the butt of his family's uproarious, mocking laughter at their wedding.
4	"Poison Is Queen"	11 October 1976
Rome, AD 13–14. Germanicus has defeated the Germans and returns to Rome in triumph. Claudius tells him of Postumus' suspicions and Germanicus passes this information on to Augustus. On a trip to Corsica, Augustus stops to see Postumus and, now aware of Postumus' innocence, promises to pardon him. Augustus privately thanks Claudius for his role in opening his eyes, and informs him that he has already changed his will to favour Postumus. Livia, ever suspicious, tricks the chief Vestal Virgin into letting her inspect the revised will. Soon afterward Augustus falls ill. He recovers when he begins to eat only food that he has grown and picked himself, but his recovery is short-lived, and after his death it becomes clear that Livia has poisoned Augustus' figs as they ripen on the tree. A Praetorian officer, Sejanus, is dispatched to kill Postumus, and Tiberius prepares to take over as Emperor, being left two-thirds of Augustus' property while Livia takes the remaining third.
5	"Some Justice"	18 October 1976
Rome, AD 19–20. Tiberius, with Sejanus' help, rules with an iron fist. Only Germanicus prevents total tyranny, but when he dies in Syria under mysterious circumstances, it is widely rumoured that Tiberius is behind it. Germanicus' wife Agrippina accuses Piso, the governor of Syria, and his wife Plancina of murder and treason. At Claudius' suggestion, they are tried in the Senate, so as to avoid subversion of the courts by Tiberius' agents. Martina, the poisoner, reveals to Livia that Germanicus' own young son, Caligula, aided her in bringing about his death by convincing him that he had been cursed. Piso blackmails Livia and Tiberius with evidence that they approved of Germanicus' murder. Livia retaliates by threatening Plancina with Martina's testimony, but the incident causes a permanent rift in her relationship with Tiberius. Plancina convinces Piso to commit suicide, knowing that she will be spared by such an outcome. When Piso hesitates, Plancina stabs him, bringing the trial to an end, and Agrippina and her allies have to be satisfied that at least "some justice" was done. Antonia punishes Caligula after finding him naked with his sister Drusilla, and he sets fire to the family home in retaliation, burning it to the ground.
6	"Queen of Heaven"	25 October 1976
Rome, AD 23–29. Claudius is invited to a dinner where the hostess, Lollia, unexpectedly reveals that she was forced to prostitute herself to Tiberius; she then stabs herself to death. Tiberius now only lives for his perversions, in which Caligula is only too happy to join. Sejanus effectively rules the empire, overseeing continual treason trials of notable citizens and seizing their property for the empire. He is having an affair with Livilla, who becomes so enamored of him that she poisons her husband, Tiberius' son Castor to be able to marry Sejanus. Sejanus tells Claudius his wife Urgulanilla is pregnant by another man, and engineers a marriage between Claudius and Sejanus' sister Aelia. Unexpectedly, Claudius receives an invitation to dine with his now-elderly grandmother Livia, who has not spoken to him in years. Anticipating her coming death, Livia reveals to Claudius that an unpublished Sibylline prophecy claims that both he and Caligula will each one day become Emperor, and makes each of them promise to proclaim her a goddess so that she can escape eternal torment for her many misdeeds. Claudius agrees on the condition that she reveal to him the full scope of her crimes, which she does. On her deathbed she receives a visit from Caligula, who rescinds his promise and reveals that he plans to become the greatest god the world has ever known. Claudius, however, renews his promise to her, and Livia dies peacefully.
7	"Reign of Terror"	1 November 1976
Rome, AD 30–31. Tiberius has retired to Capri. Sejanus consolidates his hold on power in Rome by engineering the banishment of Agrippina and her eldest son Nero and having her other son Drusus arrested and starved to death. Sejanus has divorced his wife and approaches Tiberius about marrying Livilla. Tiberius refuses as the marriage would mean Sejanus would be elevated in rank but suggests that he could marry Livilla's daughter Helen. An outraged Livilla attempts to poison Helen. Antonia discovers letters from her daughter to Sejanus, implicating them both in several deaths and urging Sejanus to murder Tiberius, and makes Claudius smuggle the evidence to Tiberius. At Caligula's suggestion, Tiberius orders Macro, an officer of the Guard, to carry out the execution of Sejanus, his followers, and his family. Claudius barely escapes by hastily divorcing his wife. Antonia has received permission from Tiberius to deal with Livilla; she locks Livilla in her room and sits outside the door until Livilla dies of starvation. Delighted by Caligula's perversity, Tiberius appoints him his heir.
8	"Zeus, by Jove!"	8 November 1976
Rome, AD 37–38. After suffering a stroke, Tiberius is smothered to death by Macro with Caligula's connivance, leaving Caligula and Tiberius' grandson Gemellus as his joint heirs. Claudius' life-long friend Herod has returned to Rome in time for Caligula's ascension. Caligula chooses Claudius to be his co-consul, over Claudius' objections. Caligula displays signs of mental instability and falls into a coma. Upon awakening he declares that he has become the god Zeus. Claudius humours him, hoping that Caligula will reveal his divinity to the Senate and be deposed, restoring the Republic. Instead the Senate accepts Caligula's claims of divinity. Caligula becomes increasingly violent; a Senator who told Macro during Caligula's coma that he would give his life if Caligula lived is forced to commit suicide. Caligula also has Gemellus killed, removes Claudius from his position of consul, and declares his sister Drusilla his wife and fellow goddess Hera. Disgusted with the depths of depravity that her family and Rome have sunk to, Antonia commits suicide, leaving Claudius distraught. Fearing that his child will become greater than he, Caligula tries to recreate the birth of Athena; as Zeus reportedly did with Metis, Caligula cuts his unborn child from his sister's belly and eats it. As alluded to in the 2002 documentary I, Claudius: A Television Epic, the original version included a closing shot after Caligula has cut the fetus from Drusilla's womb, which was considered very shocking. It was therefore re-edited several times, even on the day of its premiere, by order of Bill Slater, then Head of Serials Department. After initial broadcast and a rerun two days later, the scene was edited again, so that the episode is now "somewhat attenuated". The "slightly nastier version" of the episode's closing (a scene that used "makeup on her belly") was only shown twice in 1976 and is now lost since the BBC no longer has a copy of it. Pulman noted that the original script for the episode ended with "a long shot showing the butchered woman hanging on a chariot".
9	"Hail Who?"	15 November 1976
Rome, AD 40–41. Claudius is living with ex-prostitute Calpurnia in meagre circumstances. Caligula has turned the palace into a brothel where he sells the wives of high-ranking Senate members to the highest bidder during sexual orgies and forces Claudius to take money at the door. As a joke, he arranges for Claudius to marry the much younger, extremely beautiful Messalina. Totally insane, Caligula makes his horse Incitatus a senator, and takes his legions on a campaign to Germany to put down an alleged rebellion and then to the English Channel where he attempts to do battle with Neptune, bringing back seashells as booty. Returning to Rome, he decides to execute the entire Senate for not awarding him a Triumph for his 'victory,' but his wife Caesonia and Claudius persuade him not to. Cassius Chaerea, a leading Praetorian officer whom the Emperor continuously mocks, forms a plan with several others to assassinate Caligula. They strike during the games held to celebrate Augustus, luring him away from his German Guards and killing him. Cassius proceeds to murder Caligula's wife Caesonia, and their infant daughter Julia Drusilla, attempting to wipe out the Imperial family once and for all. While the suddenly-leaderless Praetorian Guard are looting the palace, they come upon Claudius, hiding behind a curtain, and proclaim him Emperor over his own protestations.
10	"Fool's Luck"	22 November 1976
Rome, AD 41–43. The leaders of the Praetorian Guard and Herod convince Claudius that he should take up the Imperial crown, since the alternative would mean the death of his family as well as civil war. Claudius in turn convinces the Senate to proclaim him Emperor. In his first act, he condemns Cassius for the murder of Caesonia, but pardons the other conspirators. Livia is finally deified. After successfully bearing Claudius children, Messalina convinces him to share the burdens of power with her. As Herod will soon be leaving to take control of the lands in the East that Claudius has granted him, Messalina suggests that Appius Silanus, a Senator, be brought in to assist her husband. Later her mother Domitia and Silanus marry. Before Herod leaves he warns Claudius that, as Emperor, Claudius must trust no one, not his advisors, not his wife, not even Herod himself. Messalina attempts to seduce Silanus and tells him that Claudius approves, being just as corrupt as the Emperors who preceded him. Silanus then attempts to kill Claudius in the hopes of ending the line of depraved rulers. Messalina, with her mother's help, convinces Claudius of her own innocence, and Silanus is put to death.
11	"A God in Colchester"	29 November 1976
Rome, AD 47–48. Claudius leads his troops in an invasion of Britain. Messalina's sexual excesses lead her to challenge the well-known prostitute Scylla to a contest to see who can take the most men in an evening; Messalina wins easily. Claudius returns in triumph, but is devastated to learn that Herod has organized a rebellion in the eastern provinces against his rule. Herod believes that he is the Jewish Messiah, but dies before completing his plans, begging Claudius to forgive him. Messalina takes Gaius Silius as her lover. They divorce their respective spouses and marry, thinking that Rome will rally around them and proclaim them rulers. Forced to act, Claudius' servants Pallas and Narcissus enlist Calpurnia to tell the Emperor the truth. Claudius believes them, and the conspirators are arrested and killed. As Claudius mourns the fact that all whom he cared for are gone, he learns that the Britons have dedicated a temple to him in Colchester, making him a god.
12	"Old King Log"	6 December 1976
Rome, AD 54. Claudius' benevolent rule of Rome leads the populace to accepting an emperor, but he decides that Rome must come to hate its ruling family, overthrow it, and restore the Republic. To do this, he marries his niece Agrippinilla and adopts her son Nero, making him co-heir with his son Britannicus. Because of the Sibylline prophecy Livia revealed to him (in "Queen of Heaven"), Claudius knows that Nero will become the next ruler of Rome, but he still tries to protect Britannicus by sending him to Britain so that he may take over later when Nero dies. However, Britannicus does not believe in the Republic and demands that he be allowed to compete with Nero. Claudius, knowing the ultimate future, must leave his son to his fate. Ready for his end, Claudius voluntarily eats a poisoned mushroom from his wife's fork and dies. Looking for Claudius' will, Agrippinilla and Nero come upon his autobiography and burn it. Lying on his bier, Claudius and the Sibyl, knowing that Britannicus, Agripinilla and Nero will ultimately die violently, laugh over the fact that he buried another copy of his book to be found later. Claudius is told that although the Republic won't be restored, Nero will be last of the Claudians and most of the emperors that follow won't be as bad.
