= Milonia gens =

Ancient Roman family

The gens Milonia was an obscure plebeian family at ancient Rome. The first member of this gens mentioned in history was Gaius Milonius, a Roman senator, and one of Cinna's allies. The empress Milonia Caesonia was presumably descended from this family. A few Milonii are known from inscriptions.

== Members ==
This list includes abbreviated praenomina. For an explanation of this practice, see filiation.

- Gaius Milonius, a senator, and one of the allies of the consul Cinna, when the latter was expelled from Rome by his colleague, Gnaeus Octavius, in 87 BC. Milonius was probably one of the tribunes of the plebs that year. Cinna, Marius, and Milonius returned with an army, but Milonius was slain in the fighting at the Janiculum.
- Milonius, a person mentioned in one of Horace's Satires as dancing and joking in a state of drunken revelry.
- Milonia Apollonia, the wife of Ollius Nicadas, who built a family sepulchre at Rome, dating to the first half of the first century.
- Milonia Caesonia, the fourth and last wife of Caligula, was killed along with their daughter Julia Drusilla following the emperor's assassination in AD 41.
- Milonia M. f. Secunda, a woman buried at Thibilis in Numidia, aged 35.
- Marcus Milonius Verus Junianus, commander of the ala Gallorum et Thraecorum Antiana, one of the auxilia stationed in Moesia Inferior in AD 54.

== See also ==
- List of Roman gentes

== Bibliography ==
- Titus Livius (Livy), History of Rome.
- Quintus Horatius Flaccus (Horace), Satirae (Satires).
- Flavius Josephus, Antiquitates Judaïcae (Antiquities of the Jews).
- Gaius Suetonius Tranquillus, De Vita Caesarum (Lives of the Caesars, or The Twelve Caesars).
- Granius Licinianus, Fasti (Epitome of Roman History).
- Appianus Alexandrinus (Appian), Bellum Civile (The Civil War).
- Lucius Cassius Dio Cocceianus (Cassius Dio), Roman History.
- Dictionary of Greek and Roman Biography and Mythology, William Smith, ed., Little, Brown and Company, Boston (1849).
- Theodor Mommsen et alii, Corpus Inscriptionum Latinarum (The Body of Latin Inscriptions, abbreviated CIL), Berlin-Brandenburgische Akademie der Wissenschaften (1853–present).
- T. Robert S. Broughton, The Magistrates of the Roman Republic, American Philological Association (1952–1986).
