= Nicholas Amer =

English stage, film, and television actor (1923–2019)

- Amer in 2014
- Born: Thomas Harold Amer; 29 September 1923; Tranmere, Birkenhead, Cheshire, England
- Died: 17 November 2019 (aged 96); Denville Hall, Hillingdon, Greater London, England
- Other name: Nicolas Amer
- Years active: 1948–2016
- Partner: Montague Haltrecht (1965–2010)

Thomas Harold Amer (29 September 1923 – 17 November 2019), known professionally as Nicholas Amer, was an English stage, film and television actor known for his performances in William Shakespeare's plays. Amer made his professional debut in 1948 playing the part of Ferdinand in The Tempest. In his long career, Amer played more than 27 different Shakespearean roles and toured to 31 different countries.

Amer was born in Tranmere, Birkenhead, Cheshire. He served for five years during World War II in the Royal Navy as a wireless operator aboard Motor Torpedo Boats, first in North Africa, then in the Allied invasion of Sicily, where he was wounded in action.

Following demobilisation in 1945, he studied at the Webber Douglas School of Singing and Dramatic Art in London for two years, winning the Webber Cup in his final year. He adopted the stage name Nicholas Amer and joined the Liverpool Playhouse under John Fernald. Together with Harold Lang, in 1963 he formed Voyage Theatre as a vehicle for performing Shakespeare's plays overseas.

Amer's many roles included those of Romeo, Laertes (three times), Hamlet, Ferdinand (three times), Andrew Aguecheek, Donalbain and, as he got older, Julius Caesar, Macbeth and Macduff. In the 1980s he toured the US playing King Duncan in an Old Vic production of Macbeth. His London stage appearances included A Man for All Seasons with Charlton Heston, Captain Brassbound's Conversion with Penelope Keith and The Wolf with Judi Dench and Leo McKern.

Amer's first film part was as a 'pot boy' in The Mudlark (1950) with Alec Guinness and Irene Dunne. Other film appearances included Chapuys in Henry VIII and His Six Wives (1972), Al-risâlah (The Message) (1976) starring Anthony Quinn, Admiral Nelson in Nelson's Touch (1979), The Prince and the Pauper with Rex Harrison, Mallarmé in Gauguin the Savage (1980), Peter Greenaway's The Draughtsman's Contract (1982) with Anthony Higgins and Janet Suzman, Chapuys again in A Man for All Seasons (1988), Ben Gunn in a re-make of Treasure Island (1990) with Charlton Heston, The Whipping Boy (1994), The Deep Blue Sea (2011) with Rachel Weisz and Tom Hiddleston, The Awakening (2011) with Rebecca Hall, a short, Heroes Return (2012) for Camelot, playing the World War II veteran Private Jack Jennings, filmed on location in the Burmese jungle on the border with Thailand, and his final film appearances playing Oggie in Miss Peregrine's Home for Peculiar Children (2016) and as Mr Abney in the film (short) adaptation of Lost Hearts released in 2018.

His many TV credits, starting in the early 1950s, included Hamlet (1961), The Avengers (1963), I, Claudius (1976), The Professionals (1979), If Tomorrow Comes (1986), Fortunes of War (1987), Jonathan Creek (1999), ChuckleVision (2004), Midsomer Murders (2005) and Borgia (2011).

He also wrote numerous ballet and opera reviews for The Stage under his own name and under the pseudonym 'Kenneth Smart' and appeared in numerous TV commercials.

== Biography ==
=== Family background and early life ===
Nicholas Amer was born on 29 September 1923 in Tranmere, Birkenhead, into a working class background. His father, Thomas Amer, was a bedroom steward aboard the Cunard liner RMS Laconia (and later Chief Steward aboard the Queen Mary), and his mother, Margaret (née Smart), had worked for Lever Brothers in their soap factory. He was christened Thomas Harold Amer in St Luke's Church of England Church in Tranmere and thereafter called Harold by his parents, brother and two sisters. It was many years later that he changed his name to Nicholas for the stage.

Educated at the Ionic Street School in Rock Ferry on The Wirral and then at the Alpha Drive School (which later became Kirklands Secondary Modern School), he appeared in the latter's Christmas play Jim Davis, adapted by his English Master, in December 1936. His mother, in the audience that night, was never to see him perform again as she died a year later of tuberculosis. His father was hospitalised after a street accident the same year, forcing the 14-year-old Harold to leave school, get a job and take on some of the family responsibilities.

=== Career ===
==== Early career and Second World War ====
By the time war was declared, Amer was working as a clerk in the offices of P. & T. Fitzpatrick in Liverpool, and then in 1941 he enlisted in the Royal Navy. Following training at what had been Butlins Holiday Camp in Skegness and then learning telegraphy at the training camp HMS Scotia in Ayr, Scotland, he became wireless telegrapher Amer, DJX 344924. He first served with a flotilla of Motor Torpedo Boats (MTBs) based at Weymouth in Dorset. Then he was posted to the 24th MTB Flotilla in Bône, North Africa to replace one of six 'Sparkers' killed in action in the Mediterranean. In Liverpool, on the last night of his embarkation leave, he wandered into the Playhouse to see Shakespeare's As You Like It, the cinemas all being full on that rainy evening. The performance impressed him so much that he decided that if he could survive the War he would become an actor and devote himself to acting Shakespeare's plays.

Next day he boarded a ship in Liverpool to join a convoy to Algiers. Following Erwin Rommel's defeat and the liberation of North Africa, Amer, now wireless operator aboard MTB 243, was sent to Malta. In July 1943 the Allied Forces invaded Sicily and Amer took part in the invasion and those of southern France and Greece. During operations in Sicily, he was badly wounded in action but recovered in a field hospital near Catania. When the war in Europe ended, his boat was seconded to UNRRA, the United Nations' Relief and Rehabilitation Authority. A few weeks later the War finally ended before he could be sent to the Far East to face the Japanese.

==== Acting early days ====
Demobilised in 1945, Amer returned to the Liverpool Playhouse and asked the stage door keeper for advice. The latter sent him to see the Director, John Fernald, who had also served in the Royal Navy during the War. Fernald, who was later to become Director of RADA in 1955, recommended the Webber Douglas School in South Kensington. Amer learned a soliloquy from Richard II, took the train to London, did the audition and was accepted. In his first term at the drama school, Amer was cast as Romeo and was offered a two-year scholarship. In his final year he won the Webber Cup for Best Actor which was presented to him by Sir Donald Wolfit.

As a result of his award, John Fernald offered him a contract to join the Liverpool Playhouse repertory company, which Amer accepted. In September 1948 he became a professional actor and took the stage name Nicholas Amer. His success in the third play of that season, The Intruder, a translation of Asmodé by the French playwright Jean-Jacques Bernard, prompted Fernald to make him the Juvenile Lead of the company. In the final play of the season, Amer was cast as Ferdinand in The Tempest, his first Shakespearean role as a professional actor.

Amer was essentially a 'character' actor rather than a leading man. His first London play was Fernald's production of Pinero's The Schoolmistress at the Arts Theatre, with Joan Harben, Philip Stainton and the rising star of British films at the time, Nigel Patrick. When it finished, Fernald asked Amer to play a young American opposite Jill Raymond in Rain Before Seven at the Embassy Theatre in London. The stars of this new play by Diana Morgan were Ronald Ward, Marian Spencer, Joyce Heron and William Fox. However, following the first night, the Daily Express headline ran "Rain Before Seven, ...Strain Before Eight", and the play bombed.

When the play failed to transfer to a bigger theatre, Amer was suddenly out of work. He was forced to sign on twice a week at the Labour Exchange and to find cheaper 'digs' (lodgings) in which to stay. Eventually Basil Jefferies of Renee Stepham Ltd took him on and acted as his agent. During this time he also accepted small television roles. In between these, he accepted an invitation to play Lorenzo in The Merchant of Venice opposite Canadian actress Barbara Chilcott as Jessica for a tour of the Welsh valleys, for little money and travelling by coach, with the actors having to set the stage themselves and take it down after each performance.

Again out of work following the end of the tour, Amer worked at various times as a Christmas postman, a waiter at a holiday camp on the Isle of Wight, and a night-shift worker at Wall's ice cream factory. He accepted an offer from Guildford Rep for a contract to share the task of playing leading roles in a different play each week with Edward Woodward. The season included Henry V. Leading actor Laurence Payne joined the company to play the lead role and Amer played the Dauphin of France. At that time he was recommended to John Gielgud who was casting for his forthcoming season of three plays at the Lyric Theatre, Hammersmith, and Gielgud sent for him. Amer auditioned and was offered the role of Green in Gielgud's production of Richard II, which would star Paul Scofield alongside Eileen Herlie, Pamela Brown, Eric Porter, Noel Willman and Herbert Lomas. In the other production of that season, Venice Preserv'd by Thomas Otway, starring Gielgud opposite Eileen Herlie, and directed by Peter Brook, Amer played Ternon, one of the conspirators, and understudied to Eric Porter. Gielgud, who was knighted in the new Queen's Coronation Honours List in 1953, announced that the Richard II production was being flown out to Bulawayo in Southern Rhodesia (now Zimbabwe) as part of the Cecil Rhodes centenary. It was Amer's first overseas tour.

Following the tour, Amer travelled to the Channel Islands to perform in a comedy, Blue for a Boy. John Fernald directed him once again in London, playing Razumikhin, with Kenneth Griffith as Raskolnikov, in Crime and Punishment. The new young director Peter Hall asked him to play the bridegroom in Garcia Lorca's Blood Wedding. Michael Benthall offered him a season at The Old Vic, but only small parts and understudying were on offer, except for a stint at the 1954 Edinburgh Festival as Donalbain in Macbeth, with Paul Rogers and Ann Todd in the leading roles. In 1955, when Regent's Park Open Air Theatre offered him the chance to play Ferdinand in The Tempest, Amer persuaded Benthall to release him. He played Ferdinand for a second time, this time with Robert Eddison as Prospero and James Maxwell as Ariel, and with June Bailey as Miranda, and then on alternate nights playing Percinet opposite Hilda Schroder in Rostand's The Romanticks (Les Romanesques), with character actors Russell Thorndike and Robert Atkins as the two fathers. He also performed Shakespeare live on TV, including playing Sebastian in BBC Sunday Night Theatre's Twelfth Night (1957) with Dilys Hamlett as Viola in a production by Michael Elliott and Caspar Wrede. He showed his versatility by also appearing in the 1958 musical Keep Your Hair On at the Apollo Theatre in London, directed by John Cranko and with settings and costumes designed by Tony Armstrong-Jones (later 1st Earl of Snowdon) and Desmond Heeley.

Amer's next big break came in 1958 when Peter Haddon, director of the Wimbledon Theatre, chose him to play Hamlet. All Hamlets then were middle-aged as it was thought essential to have the necessary experience. Amer was 35 years old, but looked ten years younger. The public found this young Hamlet easier to understand and reacted well. His new agent, Herbert de Leon, who wanted to get him away from Shakespeare for a while, sent him for an acting part in a musical called Chrysanthemum at the Prince of Wales Theatre in London. The choreographer, Alfred Rodrigues, had other ideas and cast him in a leading part as Pepe, the lead dancer, to play opposite and dance with the show's musical star, Patricia Kirkwood.

In 1960 following appearances in The Taming of the Shrew and The Apple Cart at the Oxford Playhouse, the director Frank Hauser invited him to be part of an overseas tour to India, Pakistan and Ceylon (now Sri Lanka) with The Oxford Playhouse Company, playing Andrew Aguecheek in Twelfth Night and directed by himself, and also to play Alex in T. S. Eliot's The Cocktail Party, directed by Harold Lang. This tour, and his meeting Harold Lang, would change his life and career profoundly.

Back in London and out of work again, Harold Lang asked Amer, along with fellow actor from the India tour, Greville Hallam, to join him teaching drama students at the Central School of Speech and Drama in London. They spent almost a year writing a play together, based on their teaching of the techniques that an actor needs to bring Shakespeare's printed text to life, calling it Macbeth In Camera. At its first performance, at the Webber Douglas School, they invited representatives of the British Council to see it. In April 1963, the Council, who had liked the play, offered them a tour of South America. They called their company 'Voyage Theatre'.

==== Voyage Theatre and the overseas tours ====
On 1 July 1963, the then four members of Voyage Theatre, Harold Lang, Greville Hallam, Ralph Gruskin and Nicholas Amer, arrived in Jamaica. A packed audience, including Sir Alexander Morley, the British High Commissioner and his wife, saw their performance of Macbeth in Camera. "No question about its success," wrote Norman Rae, theatre critic of The Daily Gleaner, while The Star ran "A refreshing and at times an exciting experience". Performances followed in Trinidad, Dominica, Antigua, Barbados, Peru, Chile, Uruguay and Argentina. In Buenos Aires, their final venue, they were put into the Teatro Odeón, so heavy was the booking to see them. La Prensa's review next day said, "Very seldom can the word 'brilliant' be more appropriately applied than to this production". Later that year the four actors won a collective Best Foreign Actor Award at the Argentine Awards Ceremony in Buenos Aires.

The British Council next sent Voyage Theatre, described by senior executive Valerie West at the time as "four splendid ambassadors waving the flag for Britain," to India, Pakistan, Nepal, Iran (Tehran and Shiraz) and Egypt (Cairo and Alexandria) as part of their Shakespeare Quatercentenary celebrations. The Council had also persuaded the Australia Council for the Arts to squeeze Voyage Theatre into their line-up for the next Adelaide Festival. On 2 March 1964, Amer arrived with his three fellow actors in Australia. They opened a week later and were enthusiastically received, their performance of Macbeth in Camera also being filmed by ABC Television for later transmission. They then flew to New Zealand under the auspices of the New Zealand Drama Council and gave performances in both islands.

Back home in London, Harold Lang wrote a new piece for Amer, Hallam and himself, Man Speaking, an examination of English poetry. Amer would do the poems of John Donne, Hallam those of William Blake and Lang would do the poems of John Milton. Meanwhile Voyage Theatre played the City of London Festival and the King's Lynn Literature Festival, before flying off again to Australia, this time to play Sydney and Melbourne but also, at the Australian Arts Council's request, to tour extensively all over New South Wales and Victoria. In December 1964, they performed at the Hong Kong Arts Festival then returned to Kathmandu in Nepal (this time at the King's request), India (Bombay), Turkey (Ankara and Istanbul) and Egypt (Cairo), then back to London. In May 1965 they travelled to Switzerland (Basel, Lausanne, Geneva and Vevey) and then back to the UK for performances in Hemel Hempstead and the Jeannetta Cochrane Theatre in London. In December of that year they toured to Turkey (Istanbul and Ankara) with Man Speaking and also to Thailand (Bangkok) en route to yet another return visit to New Zealand and Australia.

Voyage Theatre prepared itself for its longest engagement yet: they would spend six months visiting Christchurch, Wellington and Auckland in New Zealand and then Sydney, Melbourne, Freemantle, Adelaide and the Perth International Arts Festival in Australia, with both pieces and including a third play A Sleep of Prisoners by Christopher Fry. In July 1966 the Filipino impresario Ralph Zulueta took them over and billed them as 'The Intellectual Beatles', opening in Manila to a packed Independent Theatre where the famous pop group had just played. In August 1967 there was a tour to the Israel Festival in Caesarea and in October one to Brussels, Belgium for two performances of both plays. The following year in May 1968, Voyage Theatre travelled to the Berlin Festival, performed Epicœne, or The silent woman by Ben Jonson at the Oxford Playhouse in September and travelled to the Belfast Festival at Queen's in Northern Ireland in November. The following year brought a run of By-Play, a double bill of The Technicians and The Straight Man at the Phoenix Theatre, Leicester. In 1970 Toerien, Rubin & Firth (South Africa) asked Amer to play opposite Ralph Michael in Anthony Shaffer's play Sleuth in Johannesburg and Cape Town. Amer accepted, and it ran for over a year.

==== Life, almost without Shakespeare ====
Nicholas Amer was the last surviving member of the original four actors who made up Voyage Theatre. Harold Lang had died of a heart attack in Cairo in 1970, Greville Hallam had "died tragically, aged 48" in London in 1982, and Ralph Gruskin was killed in a street accident in Rome. The actors Lorne Cosette and David Kelsey had briefly been members following Ralph Gruskin's departure. Amer, now in his mid-40s, had settled firmly in London with his partner and decided not to revive it.

In the 1970s, Amer continued his acting career in the UK, appearing in Molière's The Misanthrope at the Oxford Playhouse in 1973, as Solanio in The Merchant of Venice and the Head Waiter in Ferenc Molnár's The Wolf (Oxford, then London) in 1973/74. A Man For All Seasons (role of Chapuys) followed in Manchester with James Maxwell in the lead role. Then he played Captain Scott of the Antarctic in The Captain, written and devised by John Carroll and Royce Ryton, in the Overground Theatre, Kingston upon Thames in 1976, followed by a tour of the UK with The Taming of the Shrew in 1977. He played Ross in Macbeth and also understudied Macbeth himself in a regional tour to Brighton and Cardiff. He played the title role of Julius Caesar at the Leeds Playhouse in 1979, did a three-month season at the Liverpool Playhouse in 1980/81 with appearances in The Revenger's Tragedy, amongst others, followed by performances of The Misanthrope at the Royal Exchange Theatre in Manchester.

Back in London he acted in Eugène Ionesco's technically challenging play The Lesson at the Bear & Staff pub theatre in Leicester Square in 1982, in George Bernard Shaw's Captain Brassbound's Conversion with Penelope Keith at the Theatre Royal, Haymarket in 1983, and played both Duke Frederick and Duke Senior in Shakespeare's As You Like It in Southampton the same year. Performances in When I Grow Too Old to Scream at the New End Theatre in Hampstead and A Little Bit on the Side (a Beryl Reid revue) followed on a short tour in and around London. In 1984 he played Burgess in Shaw's Candida in a Frank Hauser production for a tour of the United States which also had him playing King Duncan in Macbeth. He played the part of Otto alongside Mark Wynter in the musical Hans Andersen directed by Val May at Guildford Rep in 1986, followed by Shaw's Candida at the King's Head Theatre in Islington. He then appeared as Chaim Levi in Ron Elisha's Two opposite Amanda Boxer at the Roundhouse Downstairs, Chalk Farm in 1987. A Man For All Seasons transferred from Chichester to London in 1988, with the film version being made the following year. Lloyd George Knew My Father followed at St Edmund's Hall, Southwold in 1990, followed by Robin Hood and Mad [sic] Marion and Herne the Hunter (musical) at the Canal Cafe Theatre, Kilburn Park in 1992, The Kingfisher in Southwold in 1993, Shaw's Getting Married in Chichester the same year, and Beast on the Moon by Richard Kalinoski, directed by Irina Brook at the Battersea Arts Centre in London in 1996. By the turn of the century, Amer was concentrating his professional acting talents on films and television.

==== US tour ====
In 1984 The Old Vic Company went on tour to several cities in the Eastern United States with both Macbeth and Candida. The company opened in Ann Arbor, Michigan at the University of Michigan Theatre on 6 November, followed by performances in Iowa City, Urbana in Illinois, Dayton and Cleveland in Ohio, Clearwater in Florida, Richmond, Fairfax, Harrisonburg and Charlottesville in Virginia, the US Military Academy at West Point in New York State, ending at Proctor's Theatre, Schenectady, New York on 16 December.

==== Films ====
Nicholas Amer's first film part was as a 'pot boy' in the 1950s' film The Mudlark (1950) with Alec Guinness and Irene Dunne. In the 1970s, film director Waris Hussein asked him to play the Spanish ambassador Chapuys in his production of Henry VIII and His Six Wives (1972) starring Keith Michell and Charlotte Rampling. His next film was in the English-speaking version of Al-risâlah (The Message) (1976), shot in Libya and starring Anthony Quinn. Amer acted as voice coach to Behrouz Vossoughi, the leading Iranian actor at the time and playing opposite Quinn, in Caravans (1978) and travelled to Spain to play one of the Three Wise Men in The Nativity (1978) for 20th Century Fox. The following year, Amer played the Admiral himself in Nelson's Touch (1979), and also went to France to appear in Lady Oscar (1979). Back in London, he appeared in The Prince and the Pauper (1977) (released in the US the following year as Crossed Swords), with Rex Harrison and Mark Lester, and The Bitch (1979) with Joan Collins.

The next year saw him back in France to play the French poet Mallarmé in Gauguin the Savage (1980). In 1982 he was in Peter Greenaway's The Draughtsman's Contract (1982) with Anthony Higgins and Janet Suzman, and some years later he revisited the part of Chapuys, this time in A Man for All Seasons (1988) with Charlton Heston. Two years later, Heston asked him to play the role of Ben Gunn in a film remake of Treasure Island (1990) that he was planning, to be directed by his son Fraser. The role of Lord Chancellor in The Whipping Boy (1994) followed. He appeared as Mr Heinrichson in the short film Benjamin's Struggle in 2005, followed by the role of Mr Archibald in the short comedy film Waiting for Gorgo in 2009. Amer had a part written specially for him by film director Terence Davies and played the elderly, ailing Mr Elton in The Deep Blue Sea (2011), which starred Rachel Weisz and Tom Hiddleston. The same year also saw Amer in The Awakening (2011) with Rebecca Hall. A year later in Heroes Return (2012), directed by John Hillcoat for Camelot, Amer played the War veteran hero Private Jack Jennings returning to visit the graves of his fallen comrades in the Burmese jungle on the border with Thailand. His final appearances were as the grandfather in Segment "G is for Granddad" of the US anthology horror comedy film ABCs of Death 2 (2014) directed by Jim Hosking, as Oggie, a blind and elderly present-day resident of Cairnholm, in Tim Burton's dark fantasy film Miss Peregrine's Home for Peculiar Children (2016) and as Mr Abney in Max Van De Bank's film (short) adaptation of the M. R. James short story Lost Hearts released in 2018.

==== Television ====
Experienced theatre actors were considered essential for television in the 1950s as programmes went out live in the early days of TV drama. Amer's first television part was in Emergency – Ward 10 (1957), the first hospital 'soap', as the naval officer brother of Dr Simon Forrester, played by Frederick Bartman. Following this he appeared as the Italian opera singer Carlo Ponchi in Sing for Your Supper, the first ever TV musical for British television, written and composed by George Hall. Michael Elliott cast him as Sebastian in his and Caspar Wrede's production of Shakespeare's Twelfth Night (1957). He also appeared in the TV play Arrow in the Air by Henry Brinton and Kenneth Robinson, directed by Robert Tronson for Associated-Rediffusion (AR-TV, later Rediffusion, London) (1957), and in the 1959 children's science fiction series The Red Grass, also for AR-TV. In 1960 he did The Roving Reasons and also a comedy for children's TV called The Old Pull 'n Push, which proved so popular he did The Return of the Old Pull 'n Push the following year. Appearances in The Pursuers (1961), The Avengers (1963), and a BBC TV production of Hamlet (playing Rosencrantz), small character parts in Parbottle Speaking, Hemingway's For Whom The Bell Tolls (1965), The Root of All Evil? (1969) and Disciple of Death (1972) followed.

Then in 1976 Jack Pulman adapted I, Claudius for television from the novels of Robert Graves, and Amer had the part of Messalina's lover Mnester specially written for him and played opposite Sheila White. In 1977 he acted in Spaghetti Two-Step, in 1979 in an episode of The Professionals, in 1982, Whoops Apocalypse, Pig in the Middle and Jemima Shore Investigates, and in 1984, The Tragedy of Coriolanus (playing the Aedile) for the BBC's celebration of Shakespeare. Following these he appeared in Tender Is the Night (1985), Crossroads (1985), Artists and Models (1986), playing the middle-aged Casanova, and as a desk clerk in If Tomorrow Comes, filmed in Nice (1986), Paradise Postponed (1986), Love and Marriage (1986), The Charmer (1987), Bust (1987), Fortunes of War (1987) (shot in Yugoslavia with Kenneth Branagh and Emma Thompson), Streets Apart (1988), Eldorado (soap opera set in Spain) (1993), the TV film Knights: El Cid, Soldier of Fortune (1997), an episode of Jonathan Creek (1999), Arrows of Desire (Channel 4 poetry programme) directed by Colin Still (2002), Grange Hill (2002), Story Teller (BBC children's TV) (2002), Silent Witness (2002), My Dad's the Prime Minister (2003), ChuckleVision (2004), Merseybeat (2004) and as Arthur Leggott in an episode ('Midsomer Rhapsody') of Midsomer Murders (2005). His final TV appearance was as Prospero Santacroce in Borgia in 2011, which was shot in Prague.

==== Radio ====
In 1999 Amer played the part of Old Thorny in the Jacobean play The Witch of Edmonton for the Open University, directed by Jenny Bardwell, and some years later played Pop in the radio play A Walk to the Paradise Garden (2001) by Terence Davies for BBC Radio 3.

==== Directing ====
As well as his acting career, Nicholas Amer directed student productions at various London drama schools, including I Am a Camera by John Van Druten at the Rose Bruford College of Speech and Drama in Sidcup, Southeast London in 1980. He also directed Thom Delaney's one man show The Importance of Being Irish (1978) at the Roundhouse Downstairs in Chalk Farm, London. This collection of modern Irish poetry interspersed with songs and anecdotes later transferred to the Young Vic in London and then to a tour of Soweto and other black townships in South Africa in 1979. Amer also directed The Sea Pearls black theatre company in The Unfaithful Woman by Sam Mangwane. In 1984, he directed the South African actress Bess Finney in Ellen Terry – The Harum Scarum Girl, written originally for Judi Dench by Montague Haltrecht, at both the Isle of Man Festival and the Edinburgh Festival.

==== Teaching ====
Amer began teaching in 1960 at the Central School of Speech and Drama, then at the Webber Douglas Drama School. He also taught at the Rose Bruford College of Speech and Drama and later at the National Institute of Dramatic Art (NIDA) in Sydney, Australia. Along with his teaching duties, he also gave lectures at the Pocket Theatre in Cairo, Egypt.

Amer had a long involvement with, and was Drama Adviser to, the Ernest George White Society & School of Sinus Tone where the late Arthur D. Hewlett helped him understand Ernest White's theory of controlling the voice from the sinuses.

== Personal life ==
Travelling the world as a Shakespearean actor and a bachelor for two years was a welcome distraction from the problems of settling down. Marriage and family life had never been an option as Amer believed that it would kill his dream of devoting his life to Shakespeare. In 1965, after his second overseas tour, Amer went to the Old Vic to see the Berliner Ensemble perform The Little Mahagonny. It was there at the after-show party that he met up again with Montague Haltrecht, the man who would become his life partner, a Jewish prize-winning novelist and a BAFTA nominee. They had first met each other briefly eight years earlier while Amer was appearing in Love for Love at the Theatre Royal, Windsor in 1957. They decided to live together, and in September 2003, following the setting up of the London Partnerships Register by Ken Livingstone two years earlier, Britain's first register for same-sex couples, they decided to join. Six years later, after the law governing same-sex couples changed as a result of the government's passing of the Civil Partnership Act 2004, they decided to take advantage of the new law. Haltrecht died of cancer in March 2010, at home in Amer's arms.

Having suffered a fall at home in January 2017, Amer went to live at Denville Hall actors retirement home, where he spent the rest of his life, and died there in his sleep in 2019, at the age of 96.

== Approach to acting ==
Having survived the War and become an actor, Amer's approach to his profession was, in a word, reverential. He regarded acting as the most glorious job any servant of the public could aspire to, and he wanted to devote himself to it. His early successes, and the awards and honours they brought him, confirmed him in his belief that he had survived the war in order to dedicate his life to the works of William Shakespeare. As his career on the professional stage progressed, his common sense told him that to succeed in this he would also have to be very lucky. And indeed, after John Gielgud invited him to join his Gielgud Company at the Lyric Theatre he felt he needed no further confirmation that he was meant for Shakespeare.

== Awards and honours ==
- UK Government grant to attend the Webber Douglas School 1945
- Webber Douglas Drama School Scholarship (declined in favour of UK Government grant) 1945
- The Webber Cup, presented by Sir Donald Wolfit 1947
- Best Foreign Actor Award, Buenos Aires Award Ceremony (co-recipient with Harold Lang, Greville Hallam and Ralph Gruskin) 1963

== Filmography ==
=== Film ===
Year	Title	Role	Notes
1950	The Mudlark	Servant	Uncredited
1972	Henry VIII and His Six Wives	Chapuys	
1972	Disciple of Death	Melchisedech, the Cabalist	as Nick Amer
1976	Al-risâlah	Suheil	as Nicolas Amer
1977	The Message	Suheil	as Nicolas Amer
1977	The Prince and the Pauper	Keeper of the Tower of London	
1978	Caravans		Voice coach to Behrouz Vossoughi
1978	The Nativity	Balthasar	
1979	Lady Oscar	M. De Chantilly, the pistol duellist	
1979	The Bitch	Restaurant Maître D'	Uncredited
1979	Nelson's Touch	Admiral Nelson	
1982	The Draughtsman's Contract	Mr Parkes	as Nicolas Amer
2005	Benjamin's Struggle	Mr. Heinrichson	as Nicolas Amer
2009	Waiting for Gorgo	Mr Archibald	as Nicolas Amer
2011	The Deep Blue Sea	Mr. Elton	as Nicolas Amer
2011	The Awakening	Edgar Hirstwit	
2012	Heroes Return	Jack Jennings	
2014	ABCs of Death 2	Granddad	Segment: "G is for Granddad"
2016	Miss Peregrine's Home for Peculiar Children	Oggie	
2018	Lost Hearts	Mr Abney	

=== Television ===
Year	Title	Role	Notes
1957	Emergency – Ward 10	Naval officer brother of Dr Simon Forrester	First hospital 'soap'
1957	Sing for Your Supper	Carlo Ponchi	First ever TV musical for British television
1957	Sunday-Night Theatre	Sebastian	"Twelfth Night" (as Nicolas Amer)
1957	Arrow in the Air	Cypriot spy	
1959	The Red Grass		Children's science fiction series
1960	The Roving Reasons		"The Catanian Catastrophe"
1960	Armchair Mystery Theatre	Customer	"False Witness"
1960	The Old Pull 'n Push	Signor Perelli	"The Race" "Confusion at Cloudburst"
1961	The Avengers	Luis Alvarez	"Crescent Moon"
1961	The Return of the Old Pull 'n Push	Signor Perelli	Episode 1.1
1961	Hamlet	Rosencrantz	"The Dread Command: The Readiness Is All" "The Dread Command: The Play's the Thing" "The Dread Command: The Sovereign Power"
1961	The Pursuers	Pinky	"The Hunt" (as Nicolas Amer)
1962	Parbottle Speaking	Dr. Leighton	TV film
1965	For Whom the Bell Tolls	Corporal	"The Bridge" (as Nicolas Amer)
1969	The Root of All Evil?	Partner	"A Bit of a Holiday"
1976	I, Claudius	Mnester	"A God in Colchester"
1977	Spaghetti Two-Step	Arthur	TV film (as Nicolas Amer)
1979	The Professionals	Khadi	"A Hiding to Nothing" (as Nicolas Amer)
1980	Gauguin the Savage	Mallarmé	TV film
1981, 1983	Pig in the Middle	Second Waiter	"Ships That Pass in the Night, Stopping" (as Nicolas Amer) "The Native Hue of Resolution" (as Nicolas Amer)
1982	Whoops Apocalypse	French Agent	"Lucifer and the Lord" (as Nicolas Amer)
1983	Jemima Shore Investigates	Carlo	"The Damask Collection"
1984	The Tragedy of Coriolanus	Aedile	TV film (as Nicolas Amer)
1985	Tender Is the Night	Spanish Patient	as Nicolas Amer
1985	Crossroads		
1986	Artists and Models	Casanova	"The Passing Show" (as Nicolas Amer)
1986	If Tomorrow Comes	Carlton Hotel desk clerk	Episode 1.3 (as Nicolas Amer)
1986	Love and Marriage		"Let's Run Away to Africa"
1986	Paradise Postponed	Contessa's friend	"Living in the Past" (as Nicolas Amer)
1987	Bust	Philippe	"Write Off" (as Nicolas Amer)
1987	Fortunes of War	Palu	"The Balkans: September 1939" "Romania: January 1940" "Romania: June 1940"
1987	The Charmer	Hotel Receptionist	"Gorse, the Deceiver" (as Nicolas Amer)
1988	A Man for All Seasons	Chapuys	TV film (as Nicolas Amer)
1988	Streets Apart		
1990	Treasure Island	Ben Gunn	TV film (as Nicolas Amer)
1993	Eldorado		Soap opera
1994	The Whipping Boy	Lord Chancellor	TV film (as Nicolas Amer)
1997	Knights: El Cid, Soldier of Fortune		TV film
1999	Jonathan Creek	Bill	"Ghost's Forge"
2002	Arrows of Desire		Channel 4 poetry programme
2002	Grange Hill		
2002	Story Teller		BBC children's TV
2002	Silent Witness	Spokesman for the jury	
2003	My Dad's the Prime Minister	Old Bloke 2	"The Party"
2004	ChuckleVision	Mr. Naza	"Paul of the Ring"
2004	Merseybeat		
2005	Midsomer Murders	Arthur Leggott	"Midsomer Rhapsody"
2005	Benjamin's Struggle	Mr. Heinrichson	as Nicolas Amer
2011	Borgia	Prospero Santacroce	"The Bonds of Matrimony" (as Nicolas Amer)
