= Mnester =

1st century AD Roman pantomime actor

Mnester (Ancient Greek: Μνήστηρ; d. 48 AD) was a pantomime actor who flourished during the reigns of Roman Emperors Caligula (37 to 41 AD) and Claudius (41 to 54 AD). Caligula admired Mnester greatly. Suetonius writes that "in relation to all those who were [Caligula's] favourites, his behavior constituted madness. He used to kiss the pantomime actor Mnester even in the middle of the games. And if, when Mnester was performing, anyone made the slightest noise, he had him dragged from his seat and flogged him himself."

According to Suetonius, a portent of Caligula's assassination is said to have been Mnester's performance of "the same tragedy which the tragedian Neoptolemus had produced at the games during which King Philip of Macedon was killed."

During the reign of Caligula's successor Claudius, Mnester retained the favour of the imperial court. Mnester was one of the lovers of Poppaea Sabina the Elder (mother of the empress Poppaea), Claudius, and subsequently became the lover of Empress Messalina (the wife of Claudius). Messalina had a statue of Mnester cast in bronze. At first he rejected Messalina's advances, but then she persuaded her way in to his heart. Mnester became her lover after Messalina convinced her husband to command Mnester to adhere to Messalina's every wish. After Gaius Silius became Messalina's favourite, Mnester was one of those who was involved in Messalina's plot to assassinate Claudius and make Silius the new emperor. He was executed for his involvement in 48 AD. Mnester's name was on the list of Messalina's adulteries when they were finally revealed, and for fear that Mnester would be executed, this information had been hidden from Claudius. "Claudius probably would have spared the actor, but his freedmen convinced him that Mnester deserved to die with the others."

He was portrayed by Nicholas Amer in the 1976 TV series I, Claudius and by Rick Parets in the 1979 film Caligula.
