= Sam Dastor =

British actor (1941–2026)

- Born: 2 October 1941; Bombay, Bombay Province, British India
- Died: 5 June 2026 (aged 84)
- Education: University of Cambridge; Royal Academy of Dramatic Art
- Occupation: Actor
- Years active: 1969–2026
- Website: samdastor.com

Sam Dastor (2 October 1941 – 5 June 2026) was an Indian-born British actor best known for his appearances in British television series.

== Life and career ==
Dastor was born in Bombay, Bombay Province, British India on 2 October 1941. He was raised in a Parsi family of Zoroastrian faith, though he later converted to Christianity. He graduated from the University of Cambridge and went on to study at the Royal Academy of Dramatic Art (RADA). He subsequently joined the National Theatre, where he was under the direction of Sir Laurence Olivier.

He acted in the West End, including playing Ariel in a production of The Tempest while Paul Scofield played Prospero. Dastor also appeared in three of Simon Gray's plays: Melon, Hidden Laughter, and Cell Mates.

Dastor is best known for his many appearances on British television, often playing characters of exotic origin. His most notable roles include Cassius Chaerea in the 1976 BBC adaptation of I, Claudius and Gandhi in both Lord Mountbatten: The Last Viceroy and the film Jinnah. Other credits include Coronation Street (as Jimmy, a Weatherfield Market trader in October 1981), Crown Court (TV series) (18 episodes 1975-79 in which he played barrister Michael Bloom), Softly, Softly, Space: 1999, Blake's 7, Shoestring, Yes Minister, Fortunes of War, A Touch of Frost and Spooks.

He also narrated and voice-acted for a number of audiobooks and radio dramas.

Dastor died from cancer on 5 June 2026, aged 84.

== Partial filmography ==
- Made (1972) – Mahdav
- Jinnah (1998) – Gandhi
- Such a Long Journey (1998) – Dinshawji
- The Life and Death of Peter Sellers (2004) – Hal Ashby
