= Messalina, Messalina! =

1977 film by Bruno Corbucci

- Italian theatrical release poster by Enzo Sciotti
- Directed by: Bruno Corbucci
- Screenplay by: Mario Amendola; Bruno Corbucci
- Story by: Bruno Corbucci; Mario Amendola
- Produced by: Franco Rossellini
- Starring: Anneka Di Lorenzo; Vittorio Caprioli; Giancarlo Prete; Lino Toffolo; Tomas Milian
- Cinematography: Marcello Masciocchi
- Edited by: Daniele Alabiso
- Music by: Guido De Angelis and Maurizio De Angelis
- Production company: Medusa Distribuzione
- Release date: August 25, 1977 (Italy)
- Running time: 100 min.
- Country: Italy
- Language: Italian

Messalina, Messalina!, also known as Caligula II: Messalina, Messalina and Caligula: Sins of Rome, is a 1977 Italian sex comedy and sword-and-sandal spoof.

== Background ==
Contrary to the false marketing in some regions, the film is not in fact a sequel nor a prequel to Tinto Brass's 1979 film Caligula. During the time that Caligula spent in post-production, the film's co-producer Franco Rossellini wanted to get usage from the $20,000,000 of sets and costumes used in Caligula, fearing that the film would never be released.

The sets and costumes, as noted in the film's opening credits, were those from Caligula, designed by Danilo Donati and used without his consent. Anneka Di Lorenzo, who plays the title role of Messalina, had played the same role in Caligula. Lori Wagner, who played Agrippina in Tinto Brass's film, also reprises her role.

== Synopsis ==
The film begins with Messalina (Anneka Di Lorenzo), the wife of Claudius (Vittorio Caprioli), who is now Emperor succeeding Caligula.

Most of the film revolves around Messalina's adulterous behavior, while Claudius remains blissfully unaware. Giulio Nelio, a traveler who has come to Rome looking for a good time, meets Baba, a Roman con-man. Both become involved in the situations that result from Messalina's promiscuity. It all ends in a comedic and gory bloodbath when Claudius comes home early and finds an orgy taking place in the palace. Claudius and his soldiers kill Messalina and all of the orgy participants.

== Cast ==
- Anneka Di Lorenzo ... Messalina
- Vittorio Caprioli ... Claudius
- Giancarlo Prete ... Gaius Silius
- Lino Toffolo ... Giulio Nelio, the Man from Venice
- Tomas Milian... Baba
- Lori Wagner ... Agrippina (as Lory Kay Wagner)
- Raf Luca ...
- Bombolo ... Zenturio Bisone
- Pino Ferrara ...
- Salvatore Borghese ... Mevius (as Sal Borgese)
- Alessandra Cardini ... Calpurnia
- Luca Sportelli ...
- Ombretta De Carlo ...
- Marco Tulli ... Senofonte (as Primo Marco Tulli)

== Release ==
The film was released in Italy on August 25, 1977.
