= Montague Haltrecht =

English writer, literary critic, model and radio and TV presenter

- Born: 27 February 1932; Willesden, Middlesex, England
- Died: 27 March 2010 (aged 78); Bloomsbury, London, England
- Other name: Monty Haltrecht
- Years active: 1964–2009
- Partner: Nicholas Amer 1965–2010 (his death)

Montague Haltrecht (27 February 1932 – 27 March 2010) was an English writer, literary critic, model and radio and TV presenter. Over the course of his literary career he wrote four novels, Jonah and His Mother (1964), A Secondary Character (1965), The Devil is a Single Man (1969) and The Edgware Road (1970), exploring different aspects of Jewish life, and a biography of Sir David Webster, The Quiet Showman (1975), along with several short stories and radio and TV plays. He won the Henfield Foundation Award for his first two novels and gained a BAFTA nomination for his TV play Can You Hear Me Thinking?.

As a character model, he worked for the Ugly Models agency, and appeared in advertisements for Schweppes, Weetabix, Right Guard and Sony, amongst others. He was employed as new fiction reviewer by The Sunday Times and also contributed numerous reviews to many other leading British publications.

From the 1980s onwards he presented, and sometimes wrote, several radio and TV programmes for the BBC on a variety of subjects, including literature, opera and music.

== Family background and early life ==
Montague Haltrecht was born in Willesden, Middlesex on 27 February 1932, the third son of immigrant Jewish parents. His father, Philip (Phil) Haltrecht, originally from Łódź in Poland, had come to England in 1905 aged ten, along with his family, fleeing from persecution. His mother, Kate Oslovski, came from a Russian family from Odessa who had also fled from persecution. Phil and Kate met and married in England and had five children, sons Herbert, born in 1924, Norman, Montague and Michael, and a daughter who died at four months. Phil's father had kept a general store (Haltrecht's) in the East End of London, which Phil continued in Willesden, before moving to Golders Green in 1942.

Herbert Haltrecht was killed in action in Burma during World War II in August 1945, while Kate Haltrecht died seven years later in 1952. Phil Haltrecht found comfort in a friend of his wife's called Rose and married her sometime later. Montague, who as a teenager had been presented with complete sets of the works of both Charles Dickens and George Bernard Shaw, decided to become a writer, something he knew Herbert had wanted to be.

== Education ==
Haltrecht attended the Haberdashers' Aske's Boys' School, then located in Cricklewood, North London, between 1942 and 1948, before going on to Wadham College, Oxford in 1950 to study law before changing to English, French and Spanish. During that time he wrote articles for the college magazine and left Oxford in 1954 determined to become a novelist.

== Early career ==
For the first six years after leaving Oxford, Haltrecht's hopes for a literary career proved a disappointment. All of his submissions to editors were rejected, including five early novels that were never published. However, Haltrecht kept turning down his father's offer of a job in the family business. He rented a room, and to pay his rent he worked as a supply teacher, a railway porter, and as a reader of plays for the National Theatre at ten shillings a play. He later worked as a stagehand at a London theatre and as an 'extra' in several TV films, all the time continuing to write. Finally he gave in and accepted the job offer serving female customers in his father's dress business, first in a shop on the Walworth Road near the Elephant and Castle in South London and later in Bond Street.

== Literary career ==
It was a short story, Clouds over Bond Street, written while working in the family dress shop, and accepted by BBC Radio for a short story slot, that finally gave Haltrecht the recognition he so desired. A second short story, Il vaut plus cher mort que vivant (It is worth more dead than alive), appeared in a French collection alongside a story by Graham Greene, while a third short story, Indoor Life, was published by Hutchinson in a collection entitled Splinters, alongside those of Michael Baldwin, William Trevor and, again, Graham Greene. He assumed the lease of a larger flat, shared with his brother Norman and the latter's wife Anita. Montague took in lodgers, one of whom, the novelist Colin MacInnes, agreed to show a manuscript of Haltrecht's to his own publisher André Deutsch, who had previously rejected it. To his amazement, this time the publisher accepted it for publication. Jonah and His Mother, a novel about a young man finding his sexual identity, was Montague Haltrecht's first published book and appeared in 1964 with mixed, but generally good, reviews, The Sunday Times newspaper critic calling it "Witty, assured first novel" and The Guardian describing it variously as "Cool elegance, ingenious style" and a "small barbed masterpiece". Film rights were even discussed with a Hollywood studio, but were subsequently not taken up. The following year, 1965, André Deutsch published his second novel A Secondary Character, for which two works combined he won the Henfield Foundation Award. Four years later Collins published his third novel, The Devil Is a Single Man in 1969, followed a year later by The Edgware Road in 1970. His fifth and final book, also published by Collins, in 1975, was The Quiet Showman, a biography of Sir David Webster and the history of opera at the Royal Opera House from World War II to the 1970s. Haltrecht also ventured into writing for the stage when in 1974 he wrote a one-woman play for Judi Dench called Ellen Terry – The Harum Scarum Girl based on the life of the English stage actress. This was later produced for the theatre with the South African actress Bess Finney in the title role and directed by Nicholas Amer at both the Buxton and Edinburgh festivals and on a tour to South Africa.

== Fiction and film reviewer ==
The success of his first novel led The Sunday Times in 1965 to invite Haltrecht to be their new fiction reviewer. Haltrecht eked out his modest salary by selling the copies of books he had reviewed to bookshop owners for a few pounds each. He continued as reviewer until 1969 when he decided to give up the post so as not to interfere with the writing of any future novels. Beginning in the late 1970s, he again provided occasional reviews for The Sunday Times and also for The Sunday Telegraph, The Mail on Sunday, the Yorkshire Post, The Scotsman, The Times Literary Supplement, Times Educational Supplement, The Spectator, Books and Bookmen and Time Out, and contributed film reviews to The Jewish Chronicle.

== Modelling career ==
Despite the critics' praise, and a literary award, Haltrecht's novels had not made him any money. Following the publication of his first novel, he had found a partner in 1965, the actor Nicholas Amer, to share his life with. Amer advised him to take some photos that he had to the Ugly Models agency where he was accepted and became much in demand. The jobs on offer were so lucrative that they gave him the time he needed for writing. However, a demanding schedule of travel to Germany, Italy and South Africa soon followed. Two of Haltrecht's novels, Jonah and His Mother and The Edgware Road were banned in South Africa: the first “because of certain passages considered to be incestuous” and the second because it portrayed marriage across the racial divide.

== Radio ==
Haltrecht had already worked for the BBC translating plays from French and Spanish. In 1983, BBC Radio producer Daniel Snowman asked Haltrecht to be the presenter of a programme called Enjoying Opera, which proved to be so successful that he was asked to do five more and which were rebroadcast in 1984. In that same year, Haltrecht interviewed Irene Handl on BBC Radio about her book The Sioux. In February 1985, BBC Radio produced his play Unhappy Disturber of Our Peace, about the relationship between the actress Sarah Siddons and the portrait painter Sir Thomas Lawrence, starring Dorothy Tutin and Michael Pennington. That same year, BBC producer John Knight asked him to write and present three programmes on the life of D. H. Lawrence called Living at Full Flame, starring Michael Williams. In 1988, Haltrecht wrote and presented Enter One in Sad Green for John Knight, which examined the way in which Jews have been portrayed in the theatre throughout history. In 1990, BBC producer Jenny Bardwell asked him to interview Willy Russell and Julian Mitchell for the Open University, and in 1994 he presented A Night at the Opera. That same year, Bardwell asked him this time to present Artworks. Changing Platforms for the Open University on BBC Radio 4, which looked at writers who switched genres.

== Television ==
In 1990 Haltrecht's first TV play, Can You Hear Me Thinking? (based on an idea by Beverly Marcus whom he credited as co-writer), about the impact of schizophrenia on family life and written for the BBC's Screen One series and directed by Christopher Morahan, was an immediate success in the UK and Australia, earning a BAFTA nomination. It starred Judi Dench and Michael Williams. Haltrecht then presented The Slate: Coming up for More in 1995 for the BBC, a programme about the writer Bernice Rubens and featuring extract readings by Siân Phillips and interviews with Rubens herself and other writers. In 2006, Haltrecht played a small comic role in the children's entertainment show Dick and Dom in da Bungalow, which was successful enough for the producers to keep him in the series. He was also included in the final Favourite Moments of the Series in 2009.

== Awards and honours ==
For his first two novels, Jonah and His Mother and A Secondary Character, Haltrecht won the Henfield Foundation Award in 1967 against established writers such as Bernice Rubens and Melvyn Bragg. He travelled with his partner to New York City to collect it. In 1990 he gained a BAFTA nomination for his TV play, Can You Hear Me Thinking?

== Personal life ==
Haltrecht, being born into an Orthodox Jewish community, struggled with his homosexuality. As a young man, he was sent for weekly visits, paid for by his father, to a Jewish psychiatrist. After three attempts at proving him to be heterosexual, or at least bisexual, had ended in failure, he refused any more visits. The publication of his first novel was enough to enable him to find his voice, and within a year he had met and fallen in love with the man who was to share the rest of his life, the actor Nicholas Amer. They lived together in Bloomsbury for the next 45 years, becoming civil partners in 2009 following the change in the law governing same-sex couples as a result of the passing of the Civil Partnership Act 2004. Haltrecht died of cancer in March 2010.

== List of literary works ==
=== Novels ===
- Jonah and His Mother (Andre Deutsch, 1964)
- A Secondary Character (Andre Deutsch, 1965)
- The Devil is a Single Man (Collins, 1969)
- The Edgware Road (Collins, 1970)

=== Short stories ===
- Clouds over Bond Street (BBC Radio 4, 1965)
- Il vaut plus cher mort que vivant, in: La revue de poche – Graham Greene et six jeunes romanciers anglais (Éditions Robert Laffont, 1967)
- Indoor Life, in: Splinters (Hutchinson, 1968)

=== Drama ===
- Ellen Terry – The Harum Scarum Girl (one-woman stage play, 1974)
- Unhappy Disturber of Our Peace (BBC Radio, 1985)
- Can You Hear Me Thinking? (BBC Television, 1990)

=== Non-fiction (biography) ===
- The Quiet Showman: Sir David Webster and the Royal Opera House (Collins, 1975)
