= Rick Parets =

American actor

- Occupation: Film actor

Rick Parets is an avant-garde comedian, performing both live and in feature films. Parets grew up in Tenafly, New Jersey, United States. He rose to international fame with his portrayal of Mnester in the 1979 classic Caligula. After a series of commercials and outside projects following the movie, Parets earned a role as the Inquisitor on the TV show Witness. Then, in 1999, Parets played a detective in the Michael Chiklis, Jennifer Tilly, and William Hurt blockbuster Do Not Disturb.

== Filmography ==
| Year | Title | Role | Notes |
|---|---|---|---|
| 1979 | Caligula | Mnester | |
| 1999 | Do Not Disturb | Detective | |
