= I, Claudius (film) =

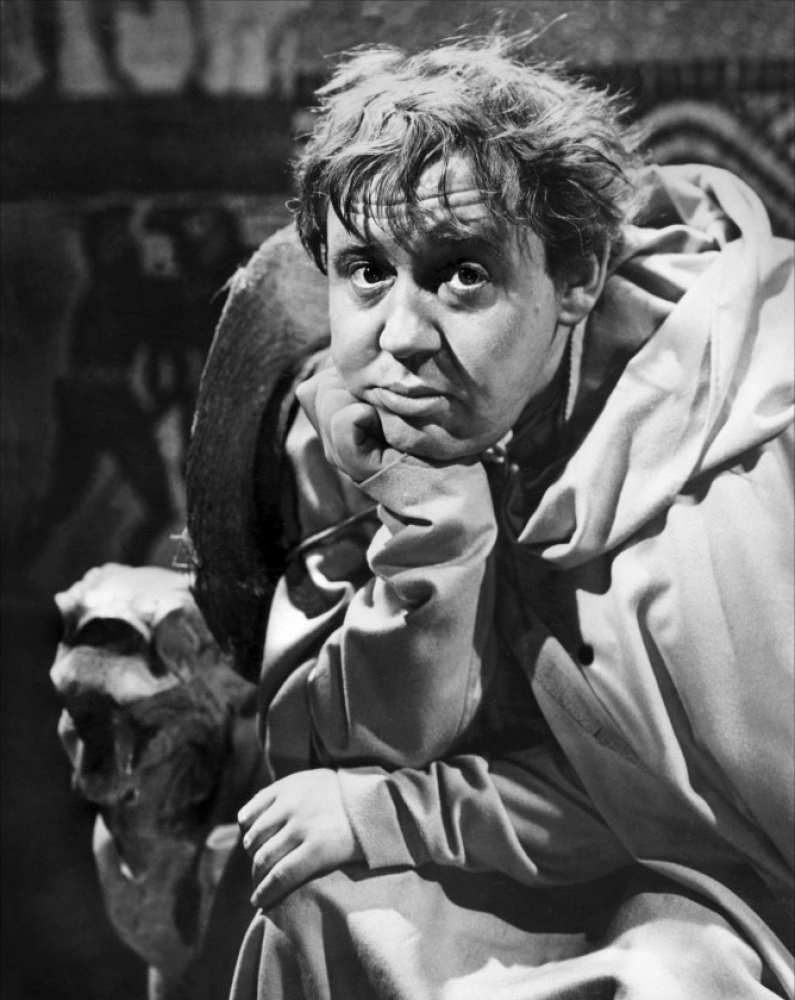
- Charles Laughton in I, Claudius (1937)
- Directed by: Josef von Sternberg
- Written by: Robert Graves
- Based on: I, Claudius and Claudius the God by Robert Graves
- Produced by: Erich Pommer
- Starring: Charles Laughton; Flora Robson; Emlyn Williams; Merle Oberon
- Cinematography: Georges Périnal
- Music by: Arthur Bliss
- Production company: London Films
- Country: United Kingdom
- Language: English
- Budget: $500,000

I, Claudius is an unfinished 1937 film adaptation of the novels I, Claudius (1934) and Claudius the God (1935) by Robert Graves. Produced by Erich Pommer for Alexander Korda's London Films, the film was directed by Josef von Sternberg, with Charles Laughton in the title role. The production was dogged by adverse circumstances, culminating in a car accident involving co-star Merle Oberon that caused filming to be ended before completion. Footage from the production was incorporated into a 1965 documentary on the making of the film, The Epic That Never Was.

== Production ==
I, Claudius was a production of Alexander Korda's London Films, produced by Erich Pommer, directed by Josef von Sternberg and starring Charles Laughton (as Claudius), Emlyn Williams (as Caligula), Flora Robson (as Livia), and Merle Oberon (as Messalina). Also in the cast were Allan Aynesworth (as Senator Asiaticus) and John Clements (as Valens). Other speaking parts included Claudius's servant Narcissus, Claudius's doctor Xenophon, Senator Sentius, and soldiers Cassius and Lupus. Laughton based his interpretation of Claudius on King Edward VIII and his abdication speech.

The production was dogged by "ill circumstances". Oberon was injured in a car accident 16 March 1937, suffering facial cuts and a slight concussion. On 26 March 1937, it was announced that the film was abandoned. Suspicions that the accident was used as a pretext for cancelling the troubled production surfaced within days, when columnist Sheilah Graham reported that quarrels between Korda and Laughton over Laughton's interpretation of Claudius was "the real reason work on the picture has been halted, not the serious injuries supposedly suffered by the leading lady, Merle Oberon, in a London auto crash." (Note: In July 1937, United Press correspondent Dan Rogers reported: "Beautiful Merle Oberon has two scars from her recent automobile accident, but movie fans will never see them. She is completely recovered, is entertaining again at her home … and will start a new picture here this month. … One [injury] was a slight cut on the left eyelid; it left no mark at all. The most serious hurt was to the back of her head; it left a scar but of course it is hidden by her thick hair. Just in front of her left ear is a fine perpendicular white line a half-inch long. So skillfully did surgeons do their job that this scar is invisible except at a range of a yard or less, in strong light.") London Films received an £80,000 (£4.71 million today) settlement from Prudential Insurance that reduced the production's losses to date.

A scheme to make use of the I, Claudius footage by incorporating it into The Denham Studio Mystery, a proposed sequel to The Arsenal Stadium Mystery (1939), fell through.

== Cast ==
- Charles Laughton as Claudius
- Merle Oberon as Messalina
- Flora Robson as Livia
- Emlyn Williams as Caligula
- Robert Newton as Cassius
- Allan Aynesworth as Asiaticus, Senator
- John Clements as Valens
- Leonora Corbett as Caesonia
- Roy Emerton as Augustus
- Gina Evans as Vestal Virgin
- Frank Forbes-Robertson as Lupus, captain of the guard
- Basil Gill as Xenophon, Claudius's doctor
- Morland Graham as Halotus, master of Livia's household
- Everley Gregg as Domitia, Messalina's mother
- Lyn Harding as Vespasian
- Allan Jeayes as Musa, Livia's physician

== The Epic That Never Was ==
The making of I, Claudius is the subject of the 1965 BBC-TV documentary, The Epic That Never Was. Hosted by Dirk Bogarde, the film uses unedited rushes from the film, contemporary glimpses of the abandoned Denham Film Studios, and modern interviews with Robert Graves, Merle Oberon, Flora Robson, Josef von Sternberg, Emlyn Williams and costume designer John Armstrong. The 75-minute film incorporates two extended scenes featuring Laughton; briefer scenes featuring Emlyn Williams, Robert Newton, Flora Robson and Merle Oberon; crowd scenes presenting sixty Vestal Virgins, a cinematic exaggeration of the traditional six; and views of Vincent Korda's opulent sets.

"Whether this would have been one of von Sternberg's great movies, I simply don't know," wrote Roger Greenspun of The New York Times after the documentary screened as part of the 1969 New York Film Festival.

Something in the controlled modeling of light over the faces of Merle Oberon and Emlyn Williams suggests that this might have been a superb film and that its loss is real and very sad. … By an admirable trick of fate the 1937 von Sternberg footage has ascended into timeless light, while the style of the surrounding 1965 documentary has dated like crazy. If you have to lose your best project, maybe this is the way to do it.

"A truly wrenching what-if was the loss of the 1937 version of I, Claudius, with Charles Laughton as the limping, stuttering, intensely admirable soon-to-be-Roman-emperor Claudius," wrote Warren Clements of The Globe and Mail. He called the original rushes seen in the BBC documentary "achingly wonderful".

In Senses of Cinema, film scholar Robert Keser wrote that,

the surviving sequences that are included do suggest that an uncommonly ambitious work of both luminous beauty and ruthless psychology was underway. Dirk Bogarde concludes his narration by wondering who else would make another attempt at filming I, Claudius, raising the final irony that scarcely a decade later, in 1976, the BBC itself would produce its memorably intense and flawlessly played television version.

The Epic That Never Was is included as a bonus feature in the Acorn DVD box set of the BBC series I, Claudius, and includes more than 20 minutes of original footage from the uncompleted 1937 film.
