= Caligula (film) =

1979 film by Tinto Brass

- American theatrical release poster
- Directed by: Tinto Brass (Note: Brass is credited with "principal photography by"; Giancarlo Lui and Bob Guccione are credited with "additional scenes directed [and photographed] by".)
- Written by: Gore Vidal (Note: Credited with "adapted from an original screenplay by".)
- Produced by: Bob Guccione; Franco Rossellini
- Starring: Malcolm McDowell; Teresa Ann Savoy; Helen Mirren; Peter O'Toole; John Steiner; Guido Mannari; Paolo Bonacelli; Leopoldo Trieste; Giancarlo Badessi; Mirella D'Angelo; Anneka Di Lorenzo; Lori Wagner; Adriana Asti; John Gielgud
- Cinematography: Silvano Ippoliti (Note: Additionally, Giancarlo Lui and Bob Guccione are credited with "additional scenes [directed and] photographed by".)
- Edited by: Nino Baragli; The Production (Note: The film's titles credit Baragli with "film editor" and The Production, a credit possibly referring to Bob Guccione and his production assistants, with "editing by".)
- Music by: Bruno Nicolai (as Paul Clemente) (Note: Musical excerpts by Aram Khachaturian and Sergei Prokofiev.)
- Production companies: Penthouse Films International; Felix Cinematografica S.R.L.
- Distributed by: Produzioni Atlas Consorziate (P.A.C.) (Italy); Analysis Film Releasing Corporation (United States)
- Release dates: August 14, 1979 (Italy); February 1, 1980 (United States)
- Running time: 156 minutes
- Countries: Italy; United States
- Languages: English; Italian
- Budget: $17.5 million
- Box office: $10 million–$23.4 million

Caligula (Italian: Caligola) is a 1979 historical drama film about the rise and fall of Roman Emperor Caligula. The film stars Malcolm McDowell in the title role, alongside Teresa Ann Savoy, Helen Mirren, Peter O'Toole, John Steiner, and John Gielgud.

Original screenwriter Gore Vidal and film director Tinto Brass both disavowed the extensive changes to their contributions, with Brass dismissed prior to editing. Financier/producer Bob Guccione, founder of Penthouse magazine, engaged Giancarlo Lui to film post-production scenes featuring hardcore sex, significantly altering the film's tone and style.

Initially released to Italian cinemas in 1979, then screened in the United States the following year, Caligula was met with legal issues and controversies over its violent and sexual content. Different abridged versions were released worldwide, while its uncut form remains banned in several countries. Despite a generally negative reception, the film has gained notoriety as a cult classic with significant merit for its political content and historical portrayal.

A 178-minute Ultimate Cut, approved by McDowell, who always felt his performance was hindered in the original version, and consisting entirely of new archival footage not used for the previous theatrical release, premiered at the Cannes Film Festival in 2023, receiving more favourable reviews from critics.

== Plot ==
Caligula is the young heir to the throne of his great-uncle, Emperor Tiberius. After a blackbird flies into his room, interpreted by Caligula as a bad omen, a head of the Praetorian Guard, Naevius Sutorius Macro, tells Caligula that Tiberius has summoned him to Capri where the Emperor lives with his close friend Nerva, Caligula's dim-witted uncle Claudius, and Caligula's cousin (Tiberius's grandson) Gemellus. Caligula fears assassination but his sister and lover Drusilla persuades him to go.

Caligula finds that Tiberius is showing signs of advanced venereal diseases and has become embittered with Rome and politics. The depraved Tiberius swims with naked youths and watches degrading sex shows involving deformed people and animals. Caligula observes with fascination and horror. Tensions rise when Tiberius tries to poison Caligula in front of Gemellus. Nerva commits suicide and Caligula tries to kill Tiberius but loses his nerve. Macro kills Tiberius to prove his loyalty to Caligula, witnessed by Gemellus.

Caligula is proclaimed the new Emperor and proclaims Drusilla as his equal, to the apparent disgust of the Roman Senate. Drusilla, fearful of Macro's influence, persuades Caligula to get rid of him. Gemellus testifies at a mock trial that Macro murdered Tiberius, then has Macro's wife Ennia banished from Rome. After Macro is executed in a gruesome public game, Caligula appoints Tiberius's former adviser Longinus as his personal assistant while pronouncing the docile Senator Chaerea as the new head of the Praetorian Guard.

Drusilla tries to find Caligula a wife among the priestesses of the goddess Isis, the cult they secretly practice. Drusilla rejects Caligula's marriage offers because they are siblings and he marries Caesonia, a priestess and notorious courtesan, after she bears him an heir. Caligula is popular with the masses but the Senate disapproves of his eccentricities. Caligula's true personality emerges when he jealously rapes both a virgin bride and her husband on their wedding day and orders Gemellus's execution to provoke a reaction from Drusilla.

After discovering that Caesonia is pregnant, Caligula develops a severe fever. Drusilla nurses him back to health and Caesonia bears him a daughter, Julia Drusilla. During the celebration, Drusilla collapses with the same fever he had. Soon afterward, Caligula receives another ill omen in the form of a blackbird. Despite praying to Isis out of desperation, Drusilla dies and Caligula has a nervous breakdown.

Caligula walks through Rome in a deep depression disguised as a beggar and is briefly jailed for causing a disturbance after watching an amateur performance mocking his relationship with Drusilla. Caligula proclaims himself a god and vows to destroy the senatorial class he loathes. Senators' wives are forced to work as prostitutes, estates are confiscated, the old religion is desecrated, and the army embarks on a mock invasion of Britain. Unable to tolerate his actions, Longinus conspires with Chaerea to assassinate Caligula.

Another blackbird appears in Caligula's bedroom but only Caesonia is frightened of it. Claudius becomes suspicious of Chaerea and follows him to a play where Caligula and his family are attacked in a coup led by Longinus and Chaerea. Caesonia and Julia are murdered, and Chaerea stabs Caligula in the stomach. With his final breath, the Emperor defiantly declares "I live!" as his and his family's bodies are thrown down the stadium's stairs. A horrified Claudius is proclaimed Emperor by the Praetorian Guard. The people of Rome, accustomed to chaos, clean the blood off the marble floors. The film ends with Caligula's horse, Incitatus, discovering the dead bodies of Caligula and his family.

== Cast ==
- Malcolm McDowell as Caligula
- Teresa Ann Savoy as Drusilla
- John Gielgud as Nerva
- Peter O'Toole as Tiberius
- Giancarlo Badessi as Claudius
- Bruno Brive as Gemellus
- Adriana Asti as Ennia
- Leopoldo Trieste as Charicles
- John Steiner as Longinus
- Mirella D'Angelo as Livia
- Helen Mirren as Caesonia
- Richard Parets as Mnester
- Paula Mitchell as Subura Singer
- Osiride Pevarello as Giant
- Donato Placido as Proculus
- Anneka Di Lorenzo as Messalina
- Lori Wagner as Agrippina
- Valerie Rae Clark as Imperial Brothel Worker
- Susanne Saxon as Imperial Brothel Worker
- Jane Hargrave as Imperial Brothel Worker
- Carolyn Patsis as Imperial Brothel Worker
- Bonnie Dee Wilson as Imperial Brothel Worker

Character	Original	English
Macro	Guido Mannari	Patrick Allen (uncredited)
Cassius Chaerea	Paolo Bonacelli	Joss Ackland (uncredited)

=== Uncredited ===
- Joan Baker
- Seán Barrett
- David Dixon
- Olive Gregg
- Neville Jason
- Geoffrey Matthews
- Robert Rietti
- Gennie Nevinson

== Production ==
=== Development ===
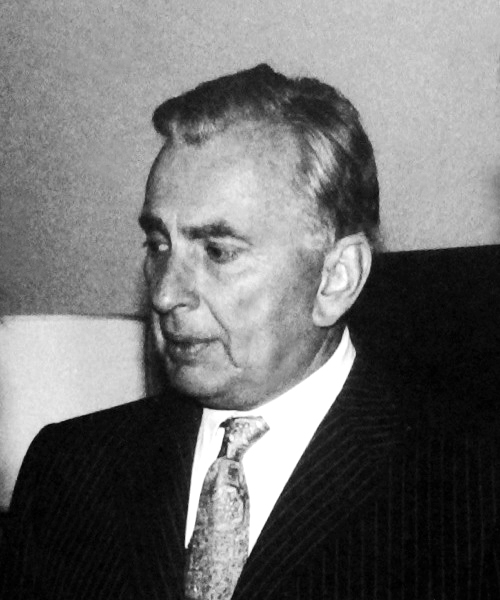
Gore Vidal was paid $200,000 to write the screenplay for Caligula. Ultimately, the film credited no official screenwriter, only that it was "adapted from a screenplay" by Vidal.

The men's magazine Penthouse had long been involved in film funding, helping invest in films made by other studios, including Chinatown, The Longest Yard and The Day of the Locust, but it had never produced a film on its own. The magazine's founder Bob Guccione wanted to produce an explicit adult film within a feature film narrative that had high production values; he decided to produce a film about the rise and fall of the Roman emperor Caligula. Development began under producer Franco Rossellini, the nephew of filmmaker Roberto Rossellini. A screenplay was written by Lina Wertmüller, but Guccione rejected Wertmüller's script and hired Gore Vidal to write a new screenplay. Vidal's script had a strong focus on homosexuality, leading Guccione to demand rewrites which toned down the gay content for wider audience appeal. Guccione was concerned that Vidal's script contained several gay sex scenes and only one scene of heterosexual sex, which was between Caligula and his sister Drusilla. Vidal was paid $200,000 for his screenplay, titled Gore Vidal's Caligula.

Elaborate sets were built by production designer Danilo Donati, who also designed the film's costumes, jewelry, hairstyles, wigs, and makeup. Several mainstream actors were cast, Guccione intending to make a film that he felt, like Citizen Kane, would be a landmark in cinematic history. Guccione offered directing duties to John Huston and Lina Wertmüller, both of whom rejected the film. After viewing scenes from the film Salon Kitty, Guccione agreed to have lunch with that film's director, Tinto Brass, believing Brass would be the ideal person to direct Caligula. Brass had a reputation for being difficult to deal with on film sets but Guccione thought the film's epic scope would "keep [Brass] in line" and that Brass understood the concept of the film enough to direct it. Brass described Vidal's screenplay as "the work of an ageing arteriosclerotic" and agreed to direct only if he was allowed to rewrite Vidal's screenplay. Brass's screenplay expanded the sexual content to include orgies, decorative phalluses, and much female nudity. Guccione said Brass's rewrites were done out of necessity to the film's visual narrative and did not alter the dialogue or content.

In an interview for Time magazine, Vidal said that in film production, directors were "parasites" and a film's author was its screenwriter; in response, Brass demanded Vidal's removal from the set and Guccione agreed. Guccione considered the film to be a "collective effort, involving the input of a great number of artists and craftsmen", and the director to be the leader of a "team effort". Vidal filed a contractual dispute over the film because of Brass's rewrites; Guccione said Vidal had demanded 10% of the film's profits, which Vidal said was not the case. Vidal distanced himself from the production, calling Brass a "megalomaniac". Brass publicly stated, "If I ever really get mad at Gore Vidal, I'll publish his script". Vidal's name was removed from the film's title; the credits were changed to state that the film was "adapted from a screenplay by Gore Vidal", crediting no official screenwriter. Guccione said, "Gore's work was basically done and Tinto's work was about to begin".

=== Themes ===
What shall it profit a man if he should gain the whole world and lose his own soul?

— Mark 8:36, quoted at the film's beginning, establishing the film's theme that "absolute power corrupts absolutely"

The film's primary theme is "absolute power corrupts absolutely". Vidal's script presented Caligula as a good man driven to madness by absolute power; Brass's screenplay envisioned Caligula as a "born monster". In The Encyclopedia of Epic Films, author Djoymi Baker describes Brass's screenplay as "an antiepic with an antihero, on a path of self-inflicted, antisocial descent". Guccione said this final draft was more violent than sexual, stating, "I maintain the film is actually anti-erotic ... in every one of its scenes you'll find a mixture of gore or violence or some other rather ugly things".

=== Casting ===
Orson Welles was initially offered $1 million to star as Tiberius, a figure which would have been his highest ever salary, but he refused on moral grounds when he read the script. Gore Vidal expressed disbelief that this could have ever been the case as he felt that Welles could not have portrayed Tiberius, but then recalled Kenneth Tynan remarking to him at the time that Welles was "upset" by the script. Renowned actors who did accept roles in the film included Malcolm McDowell, Helen Mirren, Peter O'Toole and Sir John Gielgud, with Maria Schneider cast as Caligula's doomed sister Drusilla. Owing to her lingering discomfort from her work in Last Tango in Paris four years prior, Schneider became uncomfortable with appearing nude and in sexual scenes, and left the production, to be replaced by Teresa Ann Savoy, with whom Brass had previously worked on Salon Kitty. Schneider had also apparently angered Brass by sewing up the open tunics she was supposed to wear on camera. Gielgud was also offered the role of Tiberius, which he declined, as he felt Vidal's script was "pornographic", but he later accepted the shorter role of Nerva. Director Tinto Brass cast his own acquaintances as senators and noblemen, including ex-convicts, thieves and anarchists. Guccione cast Penthouse Pets as female extras in sexual scenes.

=== Filming ===
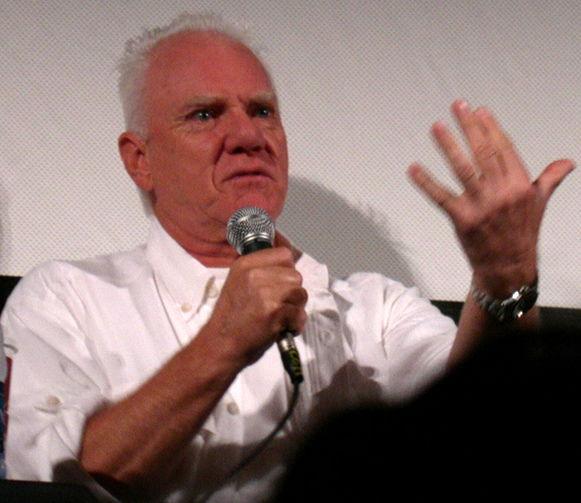
Malcolm McDowell was cast as Caligula, a "born monster" who serves as the film's antihero.

Principal photography began in 1976 in Rome. McDowell got along well with Tinto Brass, while Peter O'Toole immediately disliked the director. John Gielgud and Helen Mirren were indifferent to Brass; they ultimately trusted his direction and focused on their own performances. O'Toole had stopped drinking alcohol before filming, but Guccione described O'Toole as being "strung out on something" and said the actor was not sober during the entire filming schedule.

Guccione later complained about McDowell's behaviour, calling the actor "shallow" and "stingy". According to Guccione, during the film's production, McDowell took members of the production to dinner at an expensive restaurant to celebrate England's win in a football match against the Italian team, and left the choreographer to pay for the meal, saying he had forgotten to bring enough money. Also according to Guccione, at the end of the production, McDowell gave his dresser a pendant bearing her name, but it was misspelled and she gave it back to him. McDowell offered her a signet ring, a prop from the film. She refused because it belonged to the production company.

Brass decided not to focus much on Danilo Donati's elaborate sets, and intentionally kept the Penthouse Pets in the background during sex scenes, sometimes not filming them at all. Guccione later said that Brass, apparently as a joke, would focus on "fat, ugly and wrinkled old women" and have them play the "sensual parts" intended for the Penthouse Pets. Brass and Guccione disagreed about the film's approach to sexual content; Guccione preferred unsimulated sexual content that Brass did not want to film.

=== Post-production ===
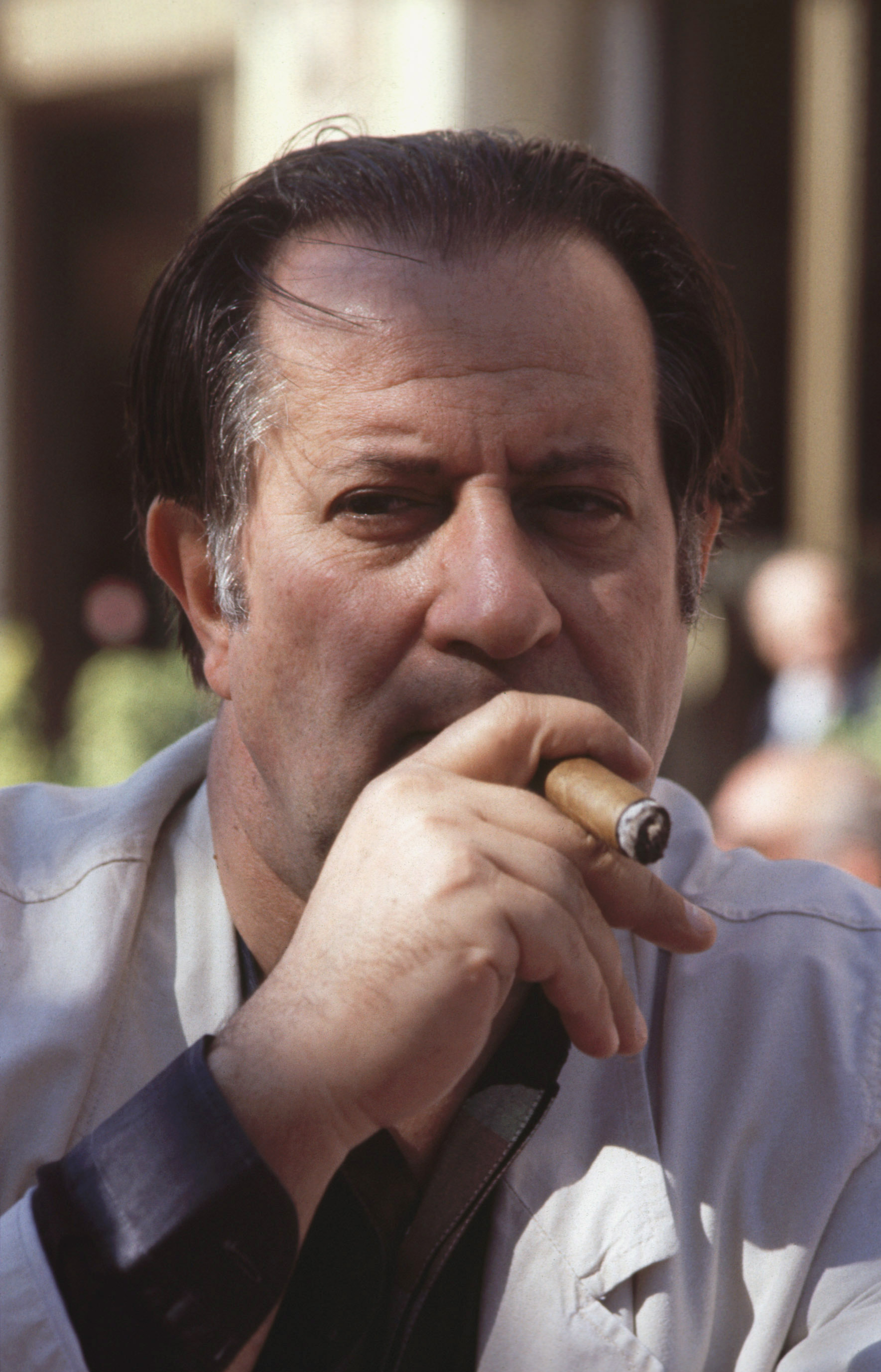
Tinto Brass served as the film's director, but disowned the film in post-production, and was credited only for "principal photography".

Filming concluded on 24 December 1976. Guccione said Brass shot enough film to "make the original version of Ben-Hur about 50 times over". Brass started editing the film but was not allowed to continue after he had edited approximately the first hour of it. His rough cut was disassembled, and the film was edited by several editors, changing its tone and structure significantly by removing and re-arranging many scenes, using different takes, a slower editing style, and music other than Brass intended.

A few weeks after filming had concluded, Guccione and Giancarlo Lui returned to Rome along with several Penthouse Pets. Guccione and Lui "hired a skeleton crew, snuck back into the studios at night, raided the prop room" and shot a number of hardcore sex scenes to be edited into the film. The new unsimulated sex scenes included Penthouse pets Anneka Di Lorenzo and Lori Wagner, who appeared as supporting characters in Brass's original footage. Both performed a lesbian scene together. Brass ultimately disowned the film as a result, and the credits only list "principal photography by Tinto Brass".

Although there were a number of editors on the film, their names were not credited. Instead, the credit "Editing by the Production" is given during the opening credits.

As it was intended for an international release, the film was shot entirely in English. It was shot with sound, but there was so much noise at the studios that the main English-speaking actors had to re-record many of their lines later. However, as many of the supporting actors/actresses were Italian, their lines needed to be dubbed in English by other performers.

Peter O'Toole was reluctant to re-record his English dialogue; he avoided the film's producers, though they eventually tracked him down to Canada where they "dragged him in front of a mike" to record his dialogue. After production ended, O'Toole expressed his dislike of the film (although, according to Guccione, he had not even seen the rushes) and doubted that it would ever be released.

Caligula spent so much time in post-production that the film's co-producer Franco Rossellini feared that it would never be released. Rossellini then decided to make Caligula's expensive sets and costumes profitable by using them in Messalina, Messalina!, a sex comedy directed by Bruno Corbucci. That film was released in Italy in 1977, two years before Caligula could be shown to the public. In some territories, it was released after Caligula and falsely marketed as its sequel. Anneka Di Lorenzo (as the title character) and Lori Wagner both reprised their roles from Caligula in Corbucci's film. Danilo Donati's sets and costumes were reused without his permission.

== Soundtrack ==
Caligula: The Music

Soundtrack album by Paul Clemente
- Released: 1980
- Recorded: Motown Studios (Songs); Emmequattro Studios (Score)
- Genres: Film score; neoclassical; pop; disco
- Length: 36:22
- Label: Penthouse
- Producer: Toni Biggs

The film was scored by Bruno Nicolai under the name Paul Clemente. According to Kristopher Spencer, the score "is gloriously dramatic, capturing both the decadent atmosphere of ancient Rome and the twisted tragedy of its true story". The score also featured music by Aram Khachaturian (from Spartacus) and Sergei Prokofiev (from Romeo and Juliet). In November 1980, Guccione formed Penthouse Records to release a double album soundtrack to Caligula. The album featured Nicolai's score and two versions—one in a disco style—of the love theme "We Are One", which did not appear in the film.

Side one
No.	Title	Writer(s)	Vocals	Length
1.	"We Are One (Caligula Love Theme)"	Toni Biggs	Lydia Van Huston	3:18
Total length:				3:18

Side two
No.	Title	Writer(s)	Vocals	Length
1.	"We Are One (Caligula Love Theme Dance Version)"	Toni Biggs	Lydia Van Huston	4:33
Total length:				4:33

Side three
No.	Title	Writer(s)	Length
1.	"Wood Sequence (Intro/Spartacus/Romeo & Juliet)"	Paul Clemente, Aram Khatchaturian, Sergei Prokofiev	4:20
2.	"Caligula & Ennia (Anfitrione)"	Paul Clemente	1:52
3.	"Caligula's Dance (Marziale)"	Paul Clemente	1:20
4.	"Drusilla's Bedroom (Spartacus)"	Aram Khatchaturian	0:55
5.	"Isis Pool (Oblio)"	Paul Clemente	4:15
6.	"Livia/Proculus Wedding (Movimento)"	Paul Clemente	3:37
7.	"Caesonia's Dance (Primitivo)"	Paul Clemente	1:25
Total length:			17:46

Side four
No.	Title	Writer(s)	Length
1.	"Drusilla's Death – Main Theme (Spartacus)"	Aram Khatchaturian	5:48
2.	"Orgy on Ship (Cinderella/Midnight Waltz)"	Sergei Prokofiev	1:52
3.	"Orgy on Ship – Part II (Orgia)"	Paul Clemente	2:28
4.	"Battle of Britain (Spartan War)"	John Leach	1:26
5.	"Play/Stadium (Equiziana)"	Paul Clemente	2:47
6.	"Caligula's Death (Romeo & Juliet)"	Sergei Prokofiev	3:32
7.	"Reprise (Spartacus [Main Theme])"	Aram Khatchaturian	0:45
Total length:			19:07

== Release ==
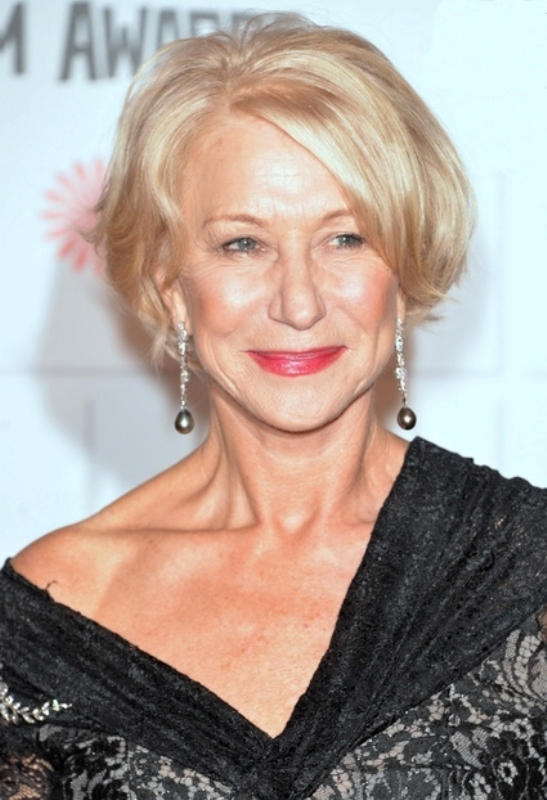
Helen Mirren was cast as Caesonia, wife of Caligula. Mirren described the film as an "irresistible mix of art and genitals".

An edited version of the film had a limited run in a small town near Forlì, Italy before opening in Rome on Sunday, November 11, 1979. In Rome, it was the highest-grossing film of the weekend, with a gross of $59,950 (equivalent to $265,940 in 2025) from 6 theaters. The film was confiscated by Italian police on November 15 with the Pubblico Ministero calling many scenes in the film "flagrantly obscene".

In the United States, Guccione refused to submit Caligula to the MPAA because he did not want the film to receive a rating—even X—which he considered to be "demeaning". Instead, Guccione applied his own "Mature Audiences" rating to the film, instructing theater owners not to admit anyone under the age of 18. The film premiered in the United States on 1 February 1980, at the Trans Lux East Theatre, which Guccione had rented exclusively to screen the film; he changed the theater's name to Penthouse East.

Rather than leasing prints to exhibitors, the distributor rented theaters that specialized in foreign and art films for the purpose of screening Caligula exclusively in order to keep the film out of theaters that showed pornographic films. In 1981, the Brazilian Board of Censors approved the establishment of special theaters to screen In the Realm of the Senses and Caligula because they were international box office hits.

Caligula grossed US$23 million (equivalent to $89.9 million in 2025) at the box office. The film was a financial success in France, Germany, Switzerland, Belgium, the Netherlands and Japan. A 102-minute R-rated version without the explicit sexual material was released in 1981.

The script was adapted as a novelisation by William Johnston using the pseudonym William Howard.

=== Legal problems ===
In 1979, when Guccione tried to import the film's footage into the U.S., customs officials seized it. Federal officials did not declare the film to be obscene. When the film was released in New York City, the anti-pornography organization Morality in Media unsuccessfully filed a lawsuit against these federal officials.

In Boston, authorities seized the film. Penthouse took legal action, partly because Guccione thought the legal challenges and moral controversies would provide "the kind of [marketing] coverage money can never buy". Penthouse won the case when a Boston Municipal Court ruled that Caligula had passed the Miller test and was not obscene. While the Boston judge said the film "lacked artistic and scientific value" because of its depiction of sex and considered it to "[appeal] to prurient interests", he said the film's depiction of ancient Rome contained political values which enabled it to pass the Miller test in its depiction of corruption in ancient Rome, which dramatized the political theme that "absolute power corrupts absolutely". A Madison, Wisconsin, district attorney declined an anti-pornography crusader's request to prevent the release of Caligula on the basis that "the most offensive portions of the film are those explicitly depicting violent, and not sexual conduct, which is not in any way prohibited by the criminal law".

Atlanta prosecutors threatened legal action if the film was to be screened in the city, but experts testified in court on behalf of the film, and Atlanta, too, declared that the film was not obscene. Citizens for Decency through Law, a private watchdog group that protested against films that it deemed immoral, sought to prevent the film's exhibition in Fairlawn, Ohio, on the grounds that it would be a "public nuisance", leading Penthouse to withdraw the film from exhibition there to avoid another trial. CDL's lawyer advised against attempting to prosecute Penthouse for obscenity and instead recommended a civil proceeding, because the film would not be placed against the Miller test. The Penthouse attorney described the Fairlawn events as being driven by conservative morality reinforced by Ronald Reagan's presidential victory, stating: "Apparently, these extremists have interpreted a change by the administration to mean a clarion call for a mandate to shackle the public's mind again." The uncut film was granted a certificate by the British Board of Film Classification in 2008. The film was banned in Australia, where it continued to be banned in its uncut form until 2021.

In 1981, Anneka Di Lorenzo, who played Messalina, sued Guccione, claiming sexual harassment. In 1990, after protracted litigation, a New York state court awarded her $60,000 in compensatory damages and $4 million in punitive damages. On appeal, the court vacated the award, ruling that punitive damages were not allowed by the law governing the case.

Rede OM, which had just become a national network, became embroiled in controversy in 1992 after being banned by the courts from showing the film due to its explicit sex scenes. The story reverberated throughout Brazil and earned the broadcaster excellent ratings by its standards, even though it only showed a censored excerpt from the film. Rede OM (as well as its affiliates, including TV Gazeta de São Paulo) was unable to show the entire film due to legal impasses. After becoming involved in several controversies, Rede OM was shut down on May 22, 1993, giving way to the current Rede CNT.

=== Contemporary reviews ===
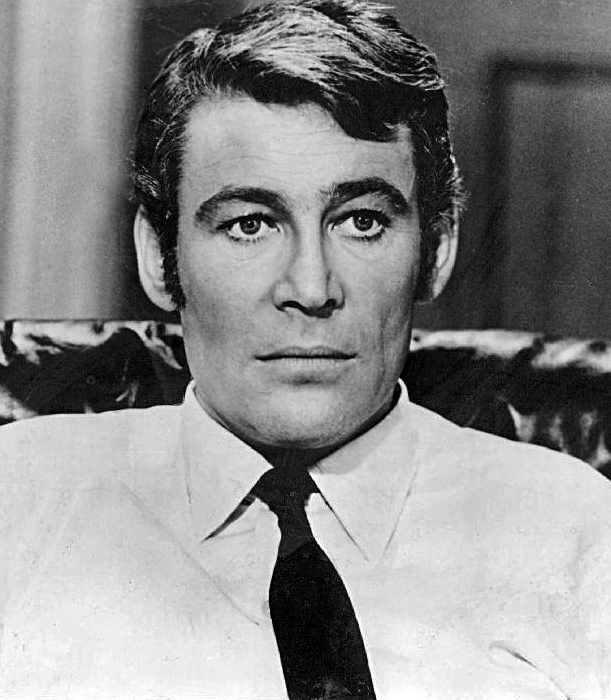
Peter O'Toole was cast as Tiberius in the film, a role originally offered to John Gielgud.

Caligula received generally negative reviews. Roger Ebert gave it zero stars, calling it "sickening, utterly worthless, shameful trash". Ebert wrote: "In the two hours of this film that I saw, there were no scenes of joy, natural pleasure, or good sensual cheer. There was, instead, a nauseating excursion into base and sad fantasies." It was one of the few films Ebert ever walked out of—he walked out 2 hours into its 170-minute length after feeling "disgusted and unspeakably depressed". He and Gene Siskel selected the film as one of their "dogs of the year" in a 1980 episode of Sneak Previews. Hank Werba of Variety described the film as a "moral holocaust" in his review. Rex Reed called Caligula "a trough of rotten swill". Jay Scott, reviewing Caligula for The Globe and Mail, said, "Caligula doesn't really work on any level". Scott unfavourably compared Caligula with In the Realm of the Senses, describing the latter film as a better treatment of extreme sexuality. Scott's review went on to say "Rome would seem to be at least as fecund a territory for the cinematic exploration of sex, death and money, as pre-war Japan ... but what's missing from Caligula, which is rife with all three, is any connective tissue (also any point of view, any thought, any meaning)". Scott concluded his review by claiming the whole film's production was "a boondoggle of landmark proportions". New York critic David Denby described the film as "an infinitely degraded version of Fellini Satyricon". Tom Milne (Monthly Film Bulletin) stated that the film was "by no means so awesomely bad as most critics have been pleased to report—but pretty bad all the same" and found the film to be "notable chiefly for the accuracy with which it reflects [Caligula's] anonymity".

== Legacy ==
Several films were released in the following years as attempts to cash in on Caligula's reputation, including Caligula and Messalina (1981), directed by Bruno Mattei and Caligula... The Untold Story (1982), directed by Joe D'Amato. Like Caligula, D'Amato's film exists in several softcore and hardcore versions.

In 1985, the hardcore version of Caligula was broadcast in France on Canal+, making it the first film with unsimulated sex scenes ever shown on French television. The film, which had been broadcast as a test, became the starting point of Canal+'s tradition of showing one pornographic film at midnight every month.

Caligula continued to garner negative reception long after its release. On the review aggregator website Rotten Tomatoes, 18% of 33 critics' reviews are positive, with an average rating of 3.8/10. The website's consensus reads: "Endlessly perverse and indulgent, Caligula throws in hardcore sex every time the plot threatens to get interesting." Writers for The Hamilton Spectator and St. Louis Post-Dispatch said Caligula was one of the worst films they'd seen. Writing for The A.V. Club, Keith Phipps said, "As a one-of-a-kind marriage of the historical epic and the porn film ... Caligula deserves a look. But it might be better to let Guccione's savagely unpleasant folly fade into the century that spawned it".

Leslie Halliwell said Caligula was "a vile curiosity of interest chiefly to sado-masochists". Time Out London called it "a dreary shambles". Positive criticism of the film came from Moviehole reviewer Clint Morris, who awarded it 3 stars out of 5, calling it "[a] classic in the coolest sense of the word". New Times critic Gregory Weinkauf gave the film 3 out of 5, calling it "Kinda dumb and tacky, but at least it's a real movie". Arkansas Democrat-Gazette reviewer Philip Martin also gave the film 3 out of 5.

=== Retrospective recognition ===
Caligula has been described as a "cult classic" by William Hawes in a book about the film. Helen Mirren has defended her involvement in the making of Caligula and even described the final product of the film as "an irresistible mix of art and genitals".

In 2005, artist Francesco Vezzoli produced a fake trailer for an alleged remake called Gore Vidal's Caligula as a promotion for Versace's new line of accessories; the fake trailer featured Mirren as "the Empress Tiberius", Gerard Butler as Chaerea, Milla Jovovich as Drusilla, Courtney Love as Caligula and Karen Black as Agrippina the Elder, and an introduction by Gore Vidal. It was screened worldwide, including New York City's Whitney Museum of American Art's 2006 Whitney Biennial.

Leonardo DiCaprio has cited Caligula as an influence on his performance as Jordan Belfort in The Wolf of Wall Street. Francis Ford Coppola's film Megalopolis has been compared to Caligula.

== Reconstruction attempts ==
=== 2007: "Imperial Edition" ===
Caligula was released on DVD and Blu-ray in an "Imperial Edition" in 2007, with the unrated theatrical release version and a new version featuring alternative sequencing from the original theatrical release and without the explicit sexual content shot by Guccione, marking the first attempt to reconstruct the film into a version closer to Brass's intentions. The reconstruction also includes audio commentaries featuring Malcolm McDowell and Helen Mirren, alongside interviews with the cast and crew.

=== 2018: Proposed Director's Cut reconstruction ===
In 2018, the documentary film Mission: Caligula on Tinto Brass's original plans for Caligula was released. The preceding years, Alexander Tuschinski, the documentary's director, had researched the topic in his Bachelor's Thesis and had assisted in the rediscovery of the film's raw footage as well as Brass's 1970s workprint. At the premiere, it was announced that Kelly Holland, then-CEO of Penthouse, was interested in having Tuschinski complete the workprint in Brass's style, if possible, with Brass's participation. Ultimately, the project did not happen.

=== 2023 Ultimate Cut reconstruction ===
Poster for Caligula: The Ultimate Cut.

Producer Thomas Negovan announced a reconstruction of the film in 2020, seeking to follow Gore Vidal's original screenplay (rather than the visions of either Brass or Guccione). Consisting of previously unreleased material, this 178-minute Ultimate Cut premiered at the 2023 Cannes Film Festival. Brass responded by taking legal action against Penthouse Films, saying: "After numerous and fruitless negotiations that have followed over the years, first with the Penthouse and then with other unclear individuals, to edit the material that I shot and which had been found in the Penthouse archives, a version has been created on which I did not take part and which I am convinced will not reflect my artistic vision. [...] The Cannes audience will therefore be misled by the arbitrary use of my name." McDowell responded positively to this version, writing on Instagram: "Because of the brilliant work of Thomas Negovan – one of my best performances has finally come to light after 47 years!"

In April 2024, Drafthouse Films acquired the Ultimate Cut for North American distribution, and released it theatrically in August 2024, followed by a streaming and 4K UHD Blu-ray release, the latter of which featured new interviews with McDowell and Negovan.

The Ultimate Cut received moderately positive reviews from critics. On the review aggregator website Rotten Tomatoes, 66% of 41 critics' reviews are positive, with an average rating of 6.7/10. The website's consensus reads: "Restoring the originally intended Caligula at long last, this new cut doesn't elevate the notorious epic to greatness but goes a long way towards vindicating its artistic vision." Metacritic, which uses a weighted average, assigned the film a score of 62 out of 100, based on 6 critics, indicating "generally favorable" reviews.

== See also ==
- List of films considered the worst
