= Anneka Di Lorenzo =

American actress (1952–2011)

- Born: Marjorie Lee Thoreson; September 6, 1952; Saint Paul, Minnesota, U.S.
- Died: January 4, 2011 (aged 58); Marine Corps Base Camp Pendleton, California, U.S.
- Occupations: Model, actress
- Known for: Participating in several exploitation films
- Spouse: Philip Vasta

Anneka Di Lorenzo, later Anneka Vasta (born Marjorie Lee Thoreson; September 6, 1952 – January 4, 2011), was an American model and actress. She was known for appearances in Penthouse magazine and roles in exploitation films.

== Early life ==
Marjorie Lee Thoreson was born in Saint Paul, Minnesota. When her parents, Leroy and Patricia (née Hull), divorced in 1965, she ran away from home to Los Angeles, where she worked as a receptionist, a cocktail waitress, and a topless dancer. During this time she took on various aliases and it was under the name of Priscilla Shutters, while still in her teens, that she was sentenced on such counts as auto theft, possession of a tear-gas gun and passing false checks.

== Career ==
At the age of 17 she appeared nude in Pix ("magazine for men who like action", April 1970) under the name Connie Stodtman. During 1972 she was winning beauty competitions under the names Susan, and then Anneka, Steinberg. Then in 1973 she began modelling for Penthouse under the name Anneka Di Lorenzo, as Pet of the Month in 1973 and Pet of the Year in 1975. Its publisher, Bob Guccione, also gave her a supporting role as Messalina in the film Caligula, which was shot in Rome in 1976. Di Lorenzo performed in several unsimulated sex scenes directed by Guccione, against the wishes of director Tinto Brass. As Caligula spent over two years in post-production, its sets and costumes were used to make the Italian comedy film Messalina, Messalina! (1977) in which Di Lorenzo reprised her role as Messalina, this time as the main female character. Other films in which she made an appearance included the 1974 exploitation films The Centerfold Girls, Mama's Dirty Girls, and Act of Vengeance; later she had a bit part as a nurse in Brian De Palma's Dressed to Kill (1980). However, after Caligula was released in 1979, her participation in the hardcore sex scenes made it difficult for her to find work in mainstream films. She later said that she had consumed drugs and alcohol to get through the scenes. In 1981 she fell out with Guccione and eventually filed a sexual harassment lawsuit against him, alleging that he compelled her to have sex with his business associates. Though she was ultimately awarded $4 million, she lost it on appeal.

== Later life and death ==
Following the end of her glamour career, Di Lorenzo lived out of the limelight, taking various jobs and then training as a yoga instructor. In 2000 she opened a short-lived branch of The Forever Young Experience Inc. under the name Anneka Thoreson, together with Philip Vasta. Later she married Vasta, but her marriage and her future business ventures failed and by 2010 she was living with one of her sisters.

In January 2011, joggers discovered Di Lorenzo's corpse with a broken neck and back, having washed up on Camp Pendleton beach. The circumstances of her death indicated either suicide or murder.

== Filmography ==
Year	Title	Role	Notes	Ref.
1974	The Centerfold Girls	Pam	Segment: "The Third Story"	
1974	Mama's Dirty Girls	Charity		
1974	Act of Vengeance	Chris		
1977	Messalina, Messalina!	Messalina		
1979	Caligula	Messalina		
1980	Dressed to Kill	Nurse	Final film role	

== See also ==
- List of unsolved deaths

1970s	Evelyn Treacher	Stephanie McLean	Tina McDowall	Patricia Barrett	Avril Lund
1970s	Anneka Di Lorenzo	Laura Bennett Doone	Victoria Lynn Johnson	Dominique Maure	Cheryl Rixon
1980s	Isabella Ardigo	Danielle Deneux	Corinne Alphen	Sheila Kennedy	Linda Kenton
1980s	None	Cody Carmack	Mindy Farrar	Patty Mullen	Ginger Miller
1990s	Stephanie Page	Simone Brigitte	Jisel	Julie Strain	Sasha Vinni
1990s	Gina LaMarca	Andi Sue Irwin	Elizabeth Ann Hilden	Paige Summers	Nikie St. Gilles
2000s	Juliet Cariaga	Zdeňka Podkapová	Megan Mason	Sunny Leone	Victoria Zdrok
2000s	Martina Warren	Jamie Lynn	Heather Vandeven	Erica Ellyson	Taya Parker
2010s	Taylor Vixen	Nikki Benz	Jenna Rose	Nicole Aniston	Lexi Belle
2010s	Layla Sin	Kenna James	Jenna Sativa	Gina Valentina	Gianna Dior
2020s	Lacy Lennon	Kenzie Anne	Amber Marie	Tahlia Paris	Renee Olstead
2020s	Kassie Wallis	-	-	-	-
