= Arrow in the Air =

Arrow in the Air is a 1957 British TV play based on the Cyprus Emergency, although Cyprus was fictionalised as "Solaro". It starred Nicholas Amer.
