= Act of Vengeance (1974 film) =

1974 American exploitation film by Bob Kelljan

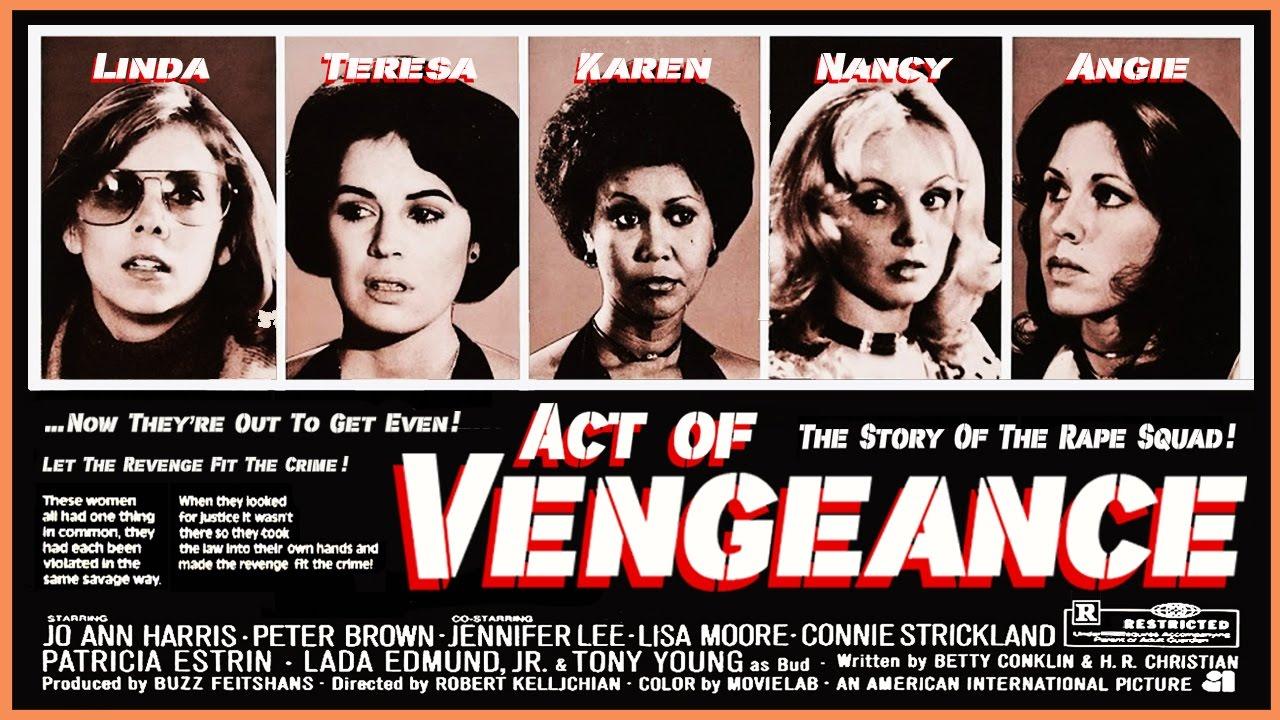
- Directed by: Bob Kelljan
- Produced by: Buzz Feitshans
- Starring: Jo Ann Harris
- Music by: Bill Marx
- Production company: American International Pictures
- Distributed by: American International Pictures
- Release date: 18 August 1974
- Running time: 81 minutes
- Country: United States
- Language: English

Act of Vengeance, also known as Rape Squad and The Violator, is a 1974 American exploitation film. It was directed by Bob Kelljan and stars Jo Ann Harris, Peter Brown, Jennifer Lee, Connie Strickland, Lisa Moore, Tony Young, Steve Kanaly and Anneka Di Lorenzo.

== Plot ==
Linda is attacked as she is leaving the barn where she keeps her horse by a man in a hockey mask. While she fights him, the man eventually incapacitates her and rapes her, making her sing "Jingle Bells" while he does. After the rape, she goes to the police, who are largely unhelpful, asking her personal questions that imply she may have brought the rape on herself, though they acknowledge that the man has assaulted other women in the past and Linda is his fourth reported victim.

After Linda leaves the police station, the film cuts to the rapist, whose face is still not visible to the audience. He makes recordings of himself talking about Linda, and it is obvious that he has been following her.

Linda breaks up with her boyfriend after he accuses her of cheating on him with the rapist and doubts that it was actually rape.

Meanwhile, seamstress Karen is working at her home when she is attacked by the hockey mask rapist. He attacks her in a similar fashion, making her sing "Jingle Bells."

The police call Linda and Karen to a line up, where the two women meet Teresa, Nancy, and Angie, who are also victims of the hockey mask rapist. They are shown a man in a hockey mask, who Karen thinks is the rapist, but they realize he is not when he is asked to read some lines. They are then shown a line up with four men in hockey masks, as the police detective explains to them that catching the rapist would be impossible, since they cannot identify him.

Frustrated, the five women leave the police station and return to Linda's apartment, where they talk about how they can take action. Linda shows the group a magazine article about rape squads - groups of women who support survivors by accompanying them to the police. They set up a phone line and start advertising their group with flyers. They also take a self-defense class from Tiny, who has a black belt in karate.

Later, when they are at a women's spa discussing their group, they are approached by Joyce, who tells them about how she was raped by a local club owner. During his trial, he paid four men to lie and say they had paid her for sex to discredit her. The women go to his club, and Linda catches his attention. He invites her back to his apartment to watch a skiing video. Even though Linda is explicit that she only wants to watch the video and leave, he attempts to rape her. She yells, and the four other women in her group and Tiny run into the apartment. Tiny beats him up while the other women destroy his apartment. They then handcuff him to the bed and dye his penis blue so that he won't be able to rape again without being identified.

Meanwhile, it is clear that the hockey mask rapist is aware that the five women know each other. He tracks down and attacks another one of their friends, choking her to death when she fights back. The police detective calls the women into the morgue to see the body and warns them that he cannot tell them to stop, but that this could be them if they are not careful. Leaving the morgue, the women argue about whether to continue.

Later, the squad is approached by Gloria, a reporter who has been receiving obscene phone messages. She has convinced her caller to meet her that evening. The squad, minus Karen, meet the man and Gloria threatens to expose him if he calls anyone again. At the same time, across town, Karen is picking up some mending from a client when she sees a pimp being physically violent with a sex worker. She goes to a phone booth and calls Tiny, and then stands and watches the scene unfold. When asked what she is doing, she says she is "biding her time." Tiny and the other squad members arrive and the squad damages the pimp's car while Tiny beats him up. They leave him bruised and bloody on the hood of his car, and then the sex worker asks if he is okay, before punching him as she walks away.

The hockey mask rapist - unmasked - is stalking his next potential victim, who sees him taking photos and calls the police, who do nothing. She passes him as she leaves her apartment, and returns home to find he has broken her lamp and gotten into her clothes. She calls the squad, who offer to drive her to her parents house.

At this point, the rapist decides to turn his attention to the five women rather than any new victims. He leaves them a series of messages at local businesses, wearing different disguises so he cannot be described to the police. They finally wind up at an abandoned zoo. Teresa wants to turn the case over to the police, but the other four women dismiss the idea. They walk through the zoo before Teresa decides to leave. After leaving she is attacked by the masked rapist, who breaks her neck. Meanwhile, the remaining four have decided to stick together. Karen's heel breaks and the rapist grabs her before the others realize she is gone. Once the others realize Karen is gone, they start to look for her, and find her in a cage with the rapist. He has her handcuffed and threatens to kill her if they don't do as he says. Nancy and Angie want to comply but Linda refuses. After Linda resists, he points to Teresa's body, which he has hung from a tree. Linda then goads the rapist, saying he was the worst man she's ever been with and he couldn't satisfy her. This causes him to take off his mask and leave the cage to confront her. She hits him with her club, and then they fight, before she ultimately bludgeons him to death with a shovel and frees her friends.

== Cast ==
- Jo Ann Harris – Linda
- Peter Brown – Jack
- Jennifer Lee – Nancy
- Lisa Moore – Karen
- Connie Strickland – Teresa
- Patricia Estrin – Angie
- Lada Edmund Jr. – Tiny
- Tony Young – Bud
- Steve Kanaly – Tom
- Ross Elliott – Sergeant Long
- Ninette Bravo – Joyce
- Stanley Adams – Bernie
- Joan McCall – Gloria
- Anneka Di Lorenzo – Chris
- Cheryl Waters - Tamara

== Reception ==
Time Out said the film was "Not as uninteresting as the title(s) might suggest".

== See also ==
- List of American films of 1974
