= I, Claudius (TV series) =

1976 BBC television series

- Genre: Historical drama
- Created by: Martin Lisemore; Joan Sullivan; Herbert Wise; Jack Pulman
- Based on: I, Claudius and Claudius the God by Robert Graves
- Written by: Jack Pulman
- Directed by: Herbert Wise
- Starring: Derek Jacobi; Siân Phillips; Brian Blessed; George Baker; John Hurt
- Country of origin: United Kingdom
- Original language: English
- No. of episodes: 12 (list of episodes)

Production
- Producer: Martin Lisemore
- Running time: 50+ minutes per episode
- Production company: BBC/London Films

Original release
- Network: BBC2
- Release: 20 September – 6 December 1976

I, Claudius (stylised as I·CLAVDIVS) is a 1976 BBC Television adaptation of Robert Graves' 1934 novel I, Claudius and its 1935 sequel Claudius the God. Written by Jack Pulman, it stars Derek Jacobi as Claudius, with Siân Phillips, Brian Blessed, George Baker, Margaret Tyzack, John Hurt, Patricia Quinn, Ian Ogilvy, Kevin McNally, Patrick Stewart and John Rhys-Davies. The series covers the history of the early Roman Empire, told from the perspective of the elderly Emperor Claudius, who narrates the series.

Among many other productions and adaptations, Graves' Claudius novels have also been adapted for a BBC Radio 4 broadcast (2010) and for the stage (1972).

== Plot summary and episodes ==
I, Claudius follows the history of the early Roman Empire, narrated by the elderly Roman Emperor Claudius, from the year 24 BC to his death in 54 AD. The series opens with Augustus, the first Emperor of Rome, attempting to find an heir, and his wife, Livia, plotting to elevate her son Tiberius to this position. An expert poisoner, Livia uses the covert assassination and betrayal of her rivals to achieve her aims, beginning with the death in 22 BC of Marcellus. The plotting, double-crossing and murder continue for many decades, through the reign of Tiberius, the political conspiracy of his Praetorian Prefect Sejanus and the depraved rule of the lunatic emperor Caligula, culminating in the accidental rise to power of his uncle Claudius. Claudius' enlightened reign is marred by the betrayals of his adulterous wife Messalina and his boyhood friend Herod Agrippa. Eventually, Claudius comes to accept the inevitability of his assassination and consents to marrying his scheming niece, Agrippina the Younger, clearing the way for the ascent of his mad stepson, Nero, whose disastrous reign Claudius vainly hopes will bring about the restoration of the Roman Republic.

== Cast ==
Major characters
- Derek Jacobi as Claudius
  - Ashley Knight as Young Claudius (ep. 3)
- Siân Phillips as Livia (ep. 1–7, 13)
- Brian Blessed as Augustus (ep. 1–5, 13)
- George Baker as Tiberius (ep. 1–9, 13)
- Margaret Tyzack as Antonia (ep. 2–4, 6–9, 13)
  - Amanda Kirby as Young Antonia (ep. 1)
- James Faulkner as Herod Agrippa (ep. 4, 6–7, 9, 11–12)
  - Michael Clements as Young Herod (ep. 3)
- John Hurt as Caligula (ep. 7–10, 13)
  - Robert Morgan as Young Caligula (ep. 6)
- Beth Morris as Drusilla (ep. 9)
- Sheila White as Messalina (ep. 10–12)
- Bernard Hepton as Marcus Antonius Pallas (ep. 11–13)
- John Cater as Tiberius Claudius Narcissus (ep. 11–13)
- Barbara Young as Agrippinilla (ep. 13)

Secondary cast

- Frances White as Julia (ep. 1–3)
- John Paul as Marcus Agrippa (ep. 1)
- Christopher Guard as Marcus Claudius Marcellus (ep. 1)
- Carleton Hobbs as Aristarchus (ep. 1)
- Angela Morant as Octavia the Younger (ep. 1)
- Sheila Ruskin as Vipsania Agrippina (ep. 1–2)
- Renu Setna as Antonius Musa (ep. 1–2)
- Freda Dowie as the Sibyl (ep. 1, 13) and Milonia Caesonia (ep. 10)
- Guy Siner as Pylades (ep. 1)
- David Davenport as Thallus (ep. 1)
- Sheridan Earl Russell as Slave (ep. 1)
- Ian Ogilvy as Nero Claudius Drusus (ep. 2)
- Roger Bisley as Senator (ep. 3) and Aulus Plautius (ep. 13)
- Tony Haygarth as Claudius' Slave
- Earl Rhodes as Gaius Caesar (ep. 2)
- Simon MacCorkindale as Lucius Caesar (ep. 3)
  - Russell Lewis as Young Lucius (ep. 2)
- Darien Angadi as Gaius Plautius Silanus (ep. 2-3)
- Kevin McNally as Castor (ep. 3–4, 6–7)
- Esmond Knight as Domitus (ep. 3)
- Kevin Stoney as Thrasyllus of Mendes (ep. 3, 7–8)
- Nick Willatt as Courier (ep. 3)
- James Fagan as Julia's Lover (ep. 3) and Asprenas (ep. 10–11)
- Patricia Quinn as Livilla (ep. 4–8)
  - Katharine Levy as Young Livilla (ep. 3)
- David Robb as Germanicus (ep. 4–6)
  - Gary Lock as Young Germanicus (ep. 3)
- Fiona Walker as Agrippina (ep. 4–8)
  - Diana Hutchinson as Young Agrippina (ep. 3)
- John Castle as Postumus (ep. 4–5)
  - Alister Kerr as Young Postumus (ep. 3)
- Norman Shelley as Horace (ep. 4)
- Donald Eccles as Gaius Asinius Pollio (ep. 4)
- Denis Carey as Livy (ep. 4)
- John Truscott as Librarian (ep. 4)
- Jennifer Croxton as Claudius' Bride (ep. 4)
- Patrick Stewart as Sejanus (ep. 5–8)
- Jonathan Burn as Paullus Fabius Maximus (ep. 5)
- Stratford Johns as Gnaeus Calpurnius Piso (ep. 6)
- Irene Hamilton as Munatia Plancina (ep. 6)
- Roy Purcell as Publius Vitellius the Younger (ep. 6)
- Patsy Byrne as Martina (ep. 6)
- George Pravda as Gershom (ep. 6)
- Isabel Dean as Lollia (ep. 7)
- Edward Jewesbury as Titus (ep. 7)
- Aubrey Richards as Lucius Visellius Varo (ep. 7)
- Peter Williams as Gaius Silius Caecina (ep. 7)
- Karin Foley as Helen (ep. 7–8)
- Neil Dickson and Michael Stock as Guards (ep. 7)
- Liane Aukin as Aelia Paetina (ep. 8)
- Charles Kay as Gaius Asinius Gallus (ep. 8)
- John Rhys-Davies as Naevius Sutorius Macro (ep. 8–9)
- Kate Lansbury as Apicata (ep. 8)
- Richard Lindfield and Pat Gorman as Captains of the Guard (ep. 8)
- Richard Hunter as Drusus Caesar (ep. 8)
- Anne Dyson as Briseis (ep. 9–10)
- Jon Laurimore as Gnaeus Cornelius Lentulus Gaetulicus (ep. 9)
- Lockwood West as Senator (ep. 9–10)
- Douglas Melbourne as Tiberius Gemellus (ep. 9)
- Jo Rowbottom as Calpurnia (ep. 10, 12)
- Sam Dastor as Cassius Chaerea (ep. 10–11)
- Norman Eshley as Marcus Vinicius (ep. 10–11)
- Bruce Purchase as Gaius Sabinus (ep. 10)
- Norman Rossington as Sergeant of the Guard (ep. 10)
- Bernard Hill as Gratus (ep. 10)
- Sally Bazely as Poppea (ep. 10)
- Jan Carey as Diana (ep. 10)
- Moira Redmond as Domitia Lepida the Younger (ep. 11–12)
- Lyndon Brook as Appius Junius Silanus (ep. 11)
- John Bennett as Gaius Stertinius Xenophon (ep. 11)
- Geoffrey Hinsliff as Rufrius Pollio (ep. 11)
- George Little as Tortius (ep. 11)
- Neal Arden as Cestius (ep. 11)
- Stuart Wilson as Gaius Silius (ep. 12)
- Nicholas Amer as Mnester (ep. 12)
- Manning Wilson as Gaius Vibius Marsus (ep. 12)
- George Innes as Quintus Justus (ep. 12)
- Charlotte Howard as Scylla (ep. 12)
- Linal Haft as Lucius Lusius Geta (ep. 12)
- Christopher Biggins as Nero (ep. 13)
- Graham Seed as Britannicus (ep. 13)
- Peter Bowles as Caratacus (ep. 13)
- George Howe as Senator (ep. 13)
- Cheryl Johnson as Claudia Octavia (ep. 13)

Note: episodes are the American cut, not the original British cut – the difference is the first, double length, episode, "A Touch of Murder", is split into 2, normal length episodes, "A Touch of Murder" and "Family Affairs", meaning that every subsequent episode number is 1 higher in the American cut than the British cut, so the total number of episodes is 13 in the American cut and 12 in the British cut.

== Production ==
The series was produced by Joan Sullivan and Martin Lisemore, and directed by Herbert Wise. Production was delayed because of complex negotiations between the BBC and the copyright holders of Alexander Korda's aborted 1937 film version. This did, however, give the scriptwriter Jack Pulman more time to fine-tune his script.

The series was shot on videotape in the studios at BBC Television Centre, for artistic rather than budgetary reasons. I, Claudius was made at a relatively low cost of £60,000 for an hour of broadcast material (£404,000 in 2025), in a series that had a total running time of 650 minutes.

As alluded to in the 2002 documentary I, Claudius: A Television Epic, the original version of episode 8, "Zeus, by Jove!", included a closing shot after Caligula has cut the fetus from Drusilla's womb, which was considered very shocking. It was therefore re-edited several times, even on the day of its premiere, by order of Bill Slater, then head of Serials Department. After initial broadcast and a rerun two days later, the scene was edited again, so that the episode is now "somewhat attenuated". The "slightly nastier version" of the episode's closing (a scene that used "makeup on her belly") was allegedly shown twice in 1976, but is now lost since the BBC no longer has a copy of it. Pulman noted that the original script for the episode ended with "a long shot showing the butchered woman hanging on a chariot".

The 2002 documentary, which features extensive interviews with all the principal cast members, revealed many previously unknown facts about the casting and development of the series, among them being:

- Derek Jacobi was well down the list of those considered to play Claudius. Among those considered for or offered the part before him were American film star Charlton Heston and British actor-comedian Ronnie Barker. Jacobi explained that he secured the role only after another prominent (unnamed) British actor who had taken the part proved to be unsuitable, and had to be replaced at short notice.
- Brian Blessed originally auditioned for the role of Tiberius, but was eventually persuaded to play Augustus instead. He recounted some of director Herbert Wise's key pieces of advice on how to play Augustus: Wise told Blessed that he should "be as you are – full of flannel", and that he should always play Augustus as an ordinary person, because the reactions of those around him would make him the Emperor.
- John Hurt said that he declined the role of Caligula when it was first offered to him. Because of the time-span of the production, the fact that Derek Jacobi would be the only actor to appear in every episode, and the subsequent commitments of the other actors, it was decided that rather than the customary "wrap party" at the end of the series, there would be a special pre-production party instead, to give the entire cast and crew the chance to meet. Hurt explained that series director Herbert Wise deliberately invited him to attend the party, hoping he would reconsider, and that he was so impressed on meeting the cast and crew that he immediately reversed his decision and took the part.
- Siân Phillips has spoken about her initial struggle to perform the character of Livia, because she focused more on making the character sympathetic and justifying her motives than playing her as straightforwardly evil. "I wasn't achieving anything much... I knew it, and they knew it. They would stand there and look faintly worried." Eventually Herbert Wise told her not to be afraid of playing her camp, saying to "Just be evil. The more evil you are, the funnier it is, and the more terrifying it is."

=== Music ===
Wilfred Josephs wrote the title music. David Wulstan and the Clerkes of Oxenford ensemble provided the (diegetic) music for most episodes.

== Home media ==
Cover of the US release of the first I, Claudius DVD

Most VHS and DVD versions of the TV series include the BBC documentary The Epic That Never Was (1965), about the unfinished 1937 Korda film version of the first book, featuring interviews with key production staff and actors, as well as most of the surviving recorded material. The 2002 UK DVD edition also contains a documentary on the series, I, Claudius – a Television Epic, as well as some alternative and deleted scenes. The US DVD release was updated on 2 December 2008 with superior audio and video to the 2000 US DVD version, but it was met with hostile reviews from some customers, citing that some parts were either cut or censored from the original version, and no subtitles or closed captioning were included.

A laserdisc box set of the 13 episode series was also released, February 1992 by PBS Home Video in the NTSC format.

On 27 March 2012, a 35th anniversary edition was released. It includes all 13 episodes (uncut except for the lost footage in "Zeus, by Jove!") on four discs, with SDH subtitles and one disc of bonus features.

== Awards and reception ==
=== United Kingdom ===
The initial reception of the show in the UK was negative. However, the series went on to become a huge success with audiences. During its original airing in 1976, the BBC estimated that I, Claudius had an average audience of 2.5 million viewers per episode, based on rating surveys. Among other awards, the series won three BAFTAs in 1977: Derek Jacobi, Best Actor (TV); Siân Phillips, Best Actress (TV); Tim Harvey, Best Design (TV). Director Herbert Wise won Outstanding Contribution Award at BAFTAs in 1978. In a list of the 100 Greatest British Television Programmes drawn up by the British Film Institute in 2000, voted for by industry professionals, I, Claudius placed 12th.

=== United States ===
The series was subsequently broadcast in the United States as part of PBS's Masterpiece Theatre series, where it received critical acclaim. Tim Harvey won a 1978 Emmy for Outstanding Art Direction. The producers and director received Emmy nominations.

On Rotten Tomatoes, the series has a rating of 100% based on 24 critic reviews. The website's consensus reads: "Marrying a trove of terrific actors at their peak with a masterful script that draws from irresistibly juicy source material, I, Claudius transcends its paltry production values to become a gold standard for historical dramas."

== Legacy ==
I, Claudius is frequently cited as one of the best British television shows and one of the best shows in history. In 2007, it was listed as one of Time magazine's "100 Best TV Shows of All-TIME", and placed at #9 on BBC America's poll of the 10 best British dramas of all time. In 2016, it was ranked #8 out of 11 on The Daily Telegraph's list of groundbreaking British TV moments.

Modern critics are unanimous in their praise for the quality of the screenplay and the actors' performances, particularly those of Siân Phillips and Derek Jacobi. The Daily Telegraph opined that the "lust for power, devious plotting and mesmerising machinations" displayed in the show foreshadowed later series like The Sopranos, Game of Thrones, and House of Cards. The creators of the hit 1980s soap opera, Dynasty, acknowledged that they were seeking to make a modern-day version of I, Claudius. Jace Lacob of The Daily Beast compared the character of Livia Soprano to the character of the same name in I, Claudius, saying that "there is a whiff of familiarity about his Livia, as though the ghost of Phillips' ancient Roman empress had echoed through millennia to rain chaos upon yet another dynastic clan."

In 2012, Mary McNamara of the Los Angeles Times credited I, Claudius with transforming the quality of television drama:

With its complex characters and multi-toned narrative, not to mention the high quality of writing, performance and direction, I, Claudius established a timeline that would eventually include the rise of HBO and all its cable competitors. This in turn expanded the palette and quality of network drama and, most recently, persuaded AMC executives to begin original programming.

However, criticism is sometimes levelled at the series over its relatively primitive production quality compared to modern TV drama, with Charlotte Higgins of The Guardian writing that "it's hard to suppress a giggle in the opening scene at Derek Jacobi's make-up and stringy wig."

== See also ==
- Claudius
- Julio-Claudian dynasty
