= Cassius Chaerea =

1st-century Roman soldier and officer

- Born: Roman Empire
- Died: January or February, AD 41; Roman Empire
- Other names: Quereas
- Occupation: Tribunus Militum (Chiliarch)

Cassius Chaerea (Classical Latin: [ˈkʰae̯rea]) was a Roman soldier and officer who served as a tribune in the army of Germanicus and in the Praetorian Guard under the emperor Caligula, whom he eventually assassinated in AD 41.

According to Tacitus, before Chaerea's service in the Praetorians, he distinguished himself with his bravery and skill in helping to subdue the mutiny on the Germanic frontier immediately after the death of Augustus in AD 14.

Chaerea was disturbed by the increasingly unbalanced Caligula, and was angered at the Emperor's mocking of his voice and of his supposed or real effeminacy. Suetonius reported that whenever Caligula had Chaerea kiss his ring, Caligula would "hold out his hand to kiss, forming and moving it in an obscene fashion". Chaerea was also made to use degrading watch-words at night, including "Venus" (slang for a male eunuch) and "Priapus" (a minor god usually depicted with an oversize, erect phallus).

Unable to bear this deliberate provocation any longer, Chaerea planned to assassinate Caligula during the Palatine games held in January 41. Caligula was despised by many people and Chaerea's plot was one of several that formed around the same time, eventually coalescing into one broad conspiracy involving a number of Praetorians, Senators, and Equestrians. On 24 January Chaerea struck, and Caligula was stabbed to death. At the same time, Caligula's wife Caesonia and daughter Julia Drusilla were murdered, completing the task of destroying the emperor's immediate family. Chaerea was sympathetic to his fellow conspirators in the Senate, and sought the destruction of the Principate. But Chaerea did not control the loyalty of the majority of the Praetorians, who quickly proclaimed Caligula's uncle, Claudius, as emperor. Shortly afterwards, Chaerea was sentenced to death, one of the few assassins to be actually condemned. Chaerea requested to be executed with his personal sword, and this boon was granted.

== In fiction ==
Cassius Chaerea is portrayed sympathetically in Robert Graves' I, Claudius novels as having had a long and distinguished career in the service of Rome, including being the only surviving officer of the massacre at Teutoburg Forest. He later serves under Caligula, whom he protected in his youth. Chaerea insists that he killed Caligula for the Republic's sake, and Claudius sympathizes with him. Chaerea is foretold in the Sibyl's prophecy to be "the horse" that will kill Caligula, as Caligula rode on Chaerea's shoulders as a child. As he did in fact according to Suetonius, the new Emperor Claudius decides he must have Cassius Chaerea executed, not so much for the murder of the insane Caligula, but for ordering the murder of Caligula's wife and infant child.

In the 1976 BBC TV series I, Claudius, Cassius Chaerea was portrayed by Sam Dastor. In the 1979 theatrical film Caligula, he was portrayed by Paolo Bonacelli.
