= Julia Drusilla (daughter of Caligula) =

Daughter of Roman emperor Caligula (AD 39–41)

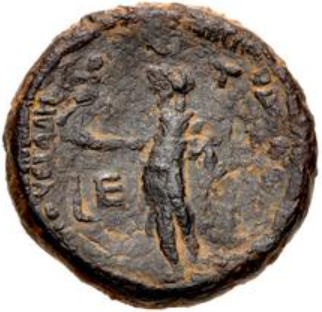
- Coin depicting Drusilla (left) being held by her mother Milonia (right)
- Born: mid–AD 39; Rome, Roman Empire
- Died: 24 January AD 41 (aged 1); Palatine Hill, Rome, Roman Empire
- Burial: Mausoleum of Augustus
- Dynasty: Julio-Claudian
- Father: Caligula
- Mother: Milonia Caesonia

Julia Drusilla (middle of AD 39 – 24 January 41), sometimes known as Drusilla the Younger (Latin: Drusilla Minor) during her lifetime, was the only child and daughter of Roman Emperor Gaius (Caligula) and his fourth and last wife Milonia Caesonia. The one-year-old Julia Drusilla was assassinated along with her parents on 24 January 41.

== Life ==
Named after her late aunt and her father's favorite sister, Julia Drusilla, Julia was born not long after Caligula married Milonia Caesonia (some sources have her being born on the same day as the marriage). The date of her parents' marriage has not been determined for certain, but it is known that it was sometime in the summer of AD 39. She had three older half-sisters from her mother's previous marriage to an unknown man. When Drusilla was born, Caligula took her to a temple that housed statues of goddesses and placed her on the lap of Minerva, instructing the goddess to nurse and train his new daughter.

Caligula's marriage to Caesonia as relates to Julia Drusilla, their daughter, is subject to dispute by historians. Suetonius states that Caligula loved Caesonia sincerely, passionately, and faithfully, even before the two were married and until the day Caligula died, even though Suetonius is otherwise heavily critical of Caligula's romantic and sexual activity. Wood, however, states that the reason for Caligula's hasty marriage with the neither young nor beautiful Caesonia was the purported illegitimacy of his daughter: should Caligula marry Julia's mother, the child would become his heir. Winterling and Schneider state that the order of events suggests that Caligula did not want to marry until a child of his had already been born, a child who would be the purpose of the union.

Soon after his daughter's birth, Caligula set up donation boxes around Rome marked "Julia's Drink" or "Julia's Food". According to Suetonius, Caligula believed that Minerva would supervise his daughter's growth and education. Suetonius further states that "[Caligula] considered [Drusilla] as his own child for no better reason than her savage temper, which was such even in her infancy, that she would attack with her nails the face and eyes of the children that play with her." In light of Suetonius's condemnation of her father, this appears more as anti-Caligula propaganda and an effort to justify the murder of the child by implying that she inherited the bad qualities of her parent.

== Murder ==
On 24 January 41, Julia Drusilla and her parents were at the imperial palace complex on the Palatine Hill in Rome. A conspiracy to assassinate Caligula and replace him with his uncle Claudius had been in discussion for some time, and this day had been chosen for the assassination. While Caligula was watching an acting troupe of young men rehearsing in the cryptoporticus (underground corridor) for an upcoming performance, as part of a series of games and dramatics held for the Divine Augustus, the Praetorian Guard, led by Cassius Chaerea, rushed Caligula and stabbed him to death. By the time Caligula's loyal Germanic guard responded, the emperor was already dead. A few hours later, the Empress Milonia was fatally stabbed by Lupus, a tribune especially sent by Chaerea to murder the two remaining family members. Drusilla was murdered by "having her brains knocked out against a wall."

=== Aftermath ===
After their murders, all images of Empress Milonia and young Drusilla Minor were destroyed in hopes of making people forget they ever existed, as a sort of damnatio memoriae. Although these once did exist, no sculptures of Milonia and Drusilla survive. Although other, more powerful motives caused the deaths of her parents, Drusilla's murder was only justified by her paternity: as Caligula's only legitimate child, she could have claimed the throne for her descendants or even for herself. The only surviving image of Drusilla is a coin issued by Herod Agrippa the Great, King of Judea, that represents Drusilla as a small child sitting next to Victory. The coin reads "to Drusilla, daughter of Augustus."

== Impact on economy ==
Julia Drusilla's birth gave Caligula an additional excuse to impose heavier taxes on the empire for the burden of parenthood. Suetonius quotes him to have complained, "In addition to the burden of sovereignty, I must now shoulder that of fatherhood." He promptly took up a collection for her education and dowry. Suetonius said that "after the birth of his daughter, complaining of his poverty, and the burdens to which he was subjected, not only as an emperor, but a father, he made a general collection for her maintenance and fortune. He likewise gave public notice, that he would receive new-year's gifts on the calends of January following; and accordingly stood in the vestibule of his house, to clutch the presents which people of all ranks threw down before him by handfuls and lapfuls. At last, being seized with an invincible desire of feeling money, taking off his slippers, he repeatedly walked over great heaps of gold coin spread upon the spacious floor, and then laying himself down, rolled his whole body in gold over and over again."

== Cultural depictions ==
She was portrayed by uncredited child actors in the 1976 miniseries I, Claudius, the 1979 film Caligula, and the third season (2019) of Netflix's anthology series Roman Empire.
