= Milonia Caesonia =

Roman empress from AD 39 to 41

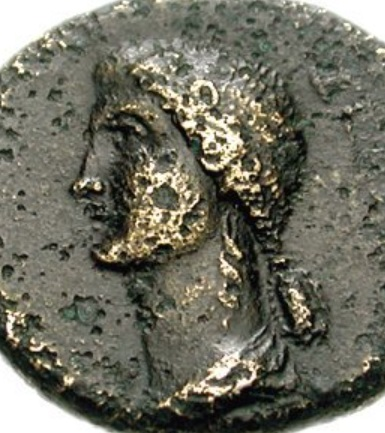
- Milonia Caesonia from a coin minted by Herod Agrippa

Roman empress
- Tenure: AD 39 – 24 January AD 41
- Died: 24 January AD 41; Palatine Hill, Rome, Italy
- Spouse: Rufus (possibly); Caligula
- Issue: 3 daughters from the first husband, Julia Drusilla
- Dynasty: Julio-Claudian
- Mother: Vistilia

Milonia Caesonia (died 24 January AD 41) was Roman empress as the fourth and last wife of the Roman emperor Caligula from their marriage in AD 39 until they were both assassinated in 41.

== Life ==
=== Early life ===
The daughter of Vistilia, Milonia was born toward the beginning of the first century, but the year is not certain. Her birthday was celebrated between 2 June and 4 June. Caesonius Maximus was believed by Marco Agosti to have been her father. The gens Caesonia was of modest origin, and had only recently come to prominence. David Wardle on the other hand argued that her father was likely a Milonius. Milonia had six half-brothers, five of whom are known, Servius Cornelius Scipio Orfitus (whose son, Servius Cornelius Scipio Salvidienus Orfitus, was consul in AD 51), Gnaeus Domitius Corbulo (consul in 39, and a distinguished general under Claudius and Nero, was the father of the empress Domitia Longina), Quintus Pomponius Secundus (consul suffectus in 41), Publius Pomponius Secundus (consul suffectus in 44) and Publius Suillius Rufus (consul in 43, and father of Marcus Suillius Nerullinus, consul in 50).

=== Marriages ===
Milonia was married first to a man of uncertain name, some historians have speculated that he was the Rufus mentioned to be married to a woman named Caesonia who was born on the same date as Domitian (24 October) in a poem by Martial. Marco Agosti identified him as Instanius (sometimes corrected as Instantius, Insantius, Istantius or Istanius) Rufus, a patron of Martial.

Suetonius says that when Caligula married her, she was neither beautiful nor young, and was already the mother of three daughters by her first marriage. He describes her as a woman of reckless extravagance and wantonness, whom Caligula nonetheless loved passionately and faithfully. According to Cassius Dio, the two entered into an affair some time before their marriage, either late in AD 39 or early in 40, and the emperor's choice of a bride was an unpopular one. The satirist Juvenal suggests that Caligula's madness was the result of a love potion administered to him by Milonia.

Milonia was pregnant at the time of the marriage, and gave birth to a daughter, Julia Drusilla, only one month later (or according to Suetonius, on her wedding day).

In the account given by Suetonius, the emperor would parade Milonia in front of his troops, and sometimes displayed her naked in front of select friends. In an odd demonstration of affection, he would jokingly threaten to have her tortured or killed.

On 24 January, AD 41, Caligula was assassinated. As part of the wider conspiracy, Milonia and her daughter Julia Drusilla were also murdered. Josephus reports that she died bravely: stricken with grief at her husband's death, she willingly offered her neck to the assassin, telling him to kill her without hesitation.

== Portraiture ==
As the wife and daughter of an emperor, Caesonia and Drusilla would have had sculptures and other portraits disseminated throughout the empire during the last year of her husband's reign. However, other than an issue of coins from Judea, no known contemporary depictions have been identified with certainty. The obverse of these coins shows Caesonia's profile, while on the reverse, she is standing and holding Drusilla. Scholars have attempted to identify other portrayals of Caesonia. A coin minted at Carthago Nova in Spain featuring the text Salus Augusta may represent Caesonia. Fuchs suggested that a sardonyx cameo in the Cabinet des Médailles in Paris might depict Caesonia, Drusilla and the goddess Roma, but it more probably represents Agrippina the Younger and her son Nero with Roma instead. Ghedini tentatively identified Caesonia as the subject of a sardonyx alabastron held in the Staatliche Museum in Berlin, possibly created to celebrate the birth of Drusilla; but Varner disagrees, arguing that the alabastron is meant to commemorate the birth of a male heir to a different empress.

== Film and television ==
Milonia has been portrayed several times on film and television:

- 1937 – Leonora Corbett in the uncompleted film I, Claudius
- 1966 – Krista Keller in the TV movie Caligula
- 1968 – Barbara Murray in the TV series The Caesars
- 1975 – Yvonne Lex in the TV movie Caligula
- 1976 – Freda Dowie in the TV series I, Claudius
- 1979 – Helen Mirren in the theatrical film Caligula

== See also ==
- List of Roman and Byzantine empresses
