= Fame Is the Spur =

Fame is the Spur is a quotation from John Milton's 1637 poem Lycidas, and may refer to:

- Fame Is the Spur (novel), a 1940 novel
- Fame Is the Spur (film), a 1947 film adapted from the novel
- Fame Is the Spur (TV series), a 1982 series based on the novel
