= List of The New York Times number-one books of 1938 =

This is a list of books that topped The New York Times best-seller list in 1938. When the list began in 1931 through 1941 it only reflected sales in the New York City area.

== Fiction ==
The following list ranks the number-one best-selling fiction books.

The two most popular books that year were The Citadel, by A. J. Cronin, which held on top of the list for 16 weeks, and The Yearling by Marjorie Kinnan Rawlings, which was on top of the list for 12 weeks.

Date	Book	Author
January 3	The Citadel	A. J. Cronin
January 10	The Citadel	A. J. Cronin
January 17	The Citadel	A. J. Cronin
January 24	The Citadel	A. J. Cronin
January 31	The Citadel	A. J. Cronin
February 7	The Prodigal Parents	Sinclair Lewis
February 14	The Citadel	A. J. Cronin
February 21	The Citadel	A. J. Cronin
February 28	The Citadel	A. J. Cronin
March 7	The Citadel	A. J. Cronin
March 14	The Citadel	A. J. Cronin
March 21	Action at Aquila	Hervey Allen
March 28	The Citadel	A. J. Cronin
April 4	Action at Aquila	Hervey Allen
April 11	The Citadel	A. J. Cronin
April 18	The Citadel	A. J. Cronin
April 25	The Citadel	A. J. Cronin
May 2	The Citadel	A. J. Cronin
May 9	The Citadel	A. J. Cronin
May 16	The Yearling	Marjorie Kinnan Rawlings
May 23	The Yearling	Marjorie Kinnan Rawlings
May 30	The Yearling	Marjorie Kinnan Rawlings
June 6	The Yearling	Marjorie Kinnan Rawlings
June 13	The Yearling	Marjorie Kinnan Rawlings
June 20	The Yearling	Marjorie Kinnan Rawlings
June 27	The Yearling	Marjorie Kinnan Rawlings
July 4	The Yearling	Marjorie Kinnan Rawlings
July 11	My Son, My Son!	Howard Spring
July 18	My Son, My Son!	Howard Spring
July 25	My Son, My Son!	Howard Spring
August 1	My Son, My Son!	Howard Spring
August 8	My Son, My Son!	Howard Spring
August 15	My Son, My Son!	Howard Spring
August 22	My Son, My Son!	Howard Spring
August 29	The Yearling	Marjorie Kinnan Rawlings
September 5	The Yearling	Marjorie Kinnan Rawlings
September 12	The Yearling	Marjorie Kinnan Rawlings
September 19	The Yearling	Marjorie Kinnan Rawlings
September 26	My Son, My Son!	Howard Spring
October 3	My Son, My Son!	Howard Spring
October 10	My Son, My Son!	Howard Spring
October 17	My Son, My Son!	Howard Spring
October 24	Rebecca	Daphne du Maurier
October 31	Rebecca	Daphne du Maurier
November 7	Rebecca	Daphne du Maurier
November 14	Rebecca	Daphne du Maurier
November 21	Rebecca	Daphne du Maurier
November 28	All This and Heaven Too	Rachel Field
December 5	Rebecca	Daphne du Maurier
December 12	Rebecca	Daphne du Maurier
December 19	Rebecca	Daphne du Maurier
December 26	All This and Heaven Too	Rachel Field

== Nonfiction ==
The following list ranks the number-one best-selling nonfiction books.

Date	Book	Author
January 3	Madame Curie	Ève Curie
January 10	Madame Curie	Ève Curie
January 17	Madame Curie	Ève Curie
January 24	Madame Curie	Ève Curie
January 31	Madame Curie	Ève Curie
February 7	Madame Curie	Ève Curie
February 14	The Importance of Living	Lin Yutang
February 21	Madame Curie	Ève Curie
February 28	Madame Curie	Ève Curie
March 7	Madame Curie	Ève Curie
March 14	The Importance of Living	Lin Yutang
March 21	The Importance of Living	Lin Yutang
March 28	The Importance of Living	Lin Yutang
April 4	The Importance of Living	Lin Yutang
April 11	The Importance of Living	Lin Yutang
April 18	The Importance of Living	Lin Yutang
April 25	The Importance of Living	Lin Yutang
May 2	The Importance of Living	Lin Yutang
May 9	The Evolution of Physics	Albert Einstein and Leopold Infeld
May 16	The Evolution of Physics	Albert Einstein and Leopold Infeld
May 23	The Evolution of Physics	Albert Einstein and Leopold Infeld
May 30	The Importance of Living	Lin Yutang
June 6	The Importance of Living	Lin Yutang
June 13	The Importance of Living	Lin Yutang
June 20	The Importance of Living	Lin Yutang
June 27	Madame Curie	Ève Curie
July 4	Madame Curie	Ève Curie
July 11	Madame Curie	Ève Curie
July 18	The Importance of Living	Lin Yutang
July 25	Fanny Kemble	Margaret Armstrong
August 1	The Importance of Living	Lin Yutang
August 8	The Importance of Living	Lin Yutang
August 15	The Importance of Living	Lin Yutang
August 22	The Importance of Living	Lin Yutang
August 29	The Importance of Living	Lin Yutang
September 5	With Malice Toward Some	Margaret Halsey
September 12	With Malice Toward Some	Margaret Halsey
September 19	With Malice Toward Some	Margaret Halsey
September 26	The Horse and Buggy Doctor	Arthur E. Hertzler
October 3	With Malice Toward Some	Margaret Halsey
October 10	With Malice Toward Some	Margaret Halsey
October 17	With Malice Toward Some	Margaret Halsey
October 24	Listen! The Wind	Anne Morrow Lindbergh
October 31	Listen! The Wind	Anne Morrow Lindbergh
November 7	Listen! The Wind	Anne Morrow Lindbergh
November 14	Listen! The Wind	Anne Morrow Lindbergh
November 21	Listen! The Wind	Anne Morrow Lindbergh
November 28	Listen! The Wind	Anne Morrow Lindbergh
December 5	Listen! The Wind	Anne Morrow Lindbergh
December 12	Listen! The Wind	Anne Morrow Lindbergh
December 19	Listen! The Wind	Anne Morrow Lindbergh
December 26	Listen! The Wind	Anne Morrow Lindbergh

== See also ==
- Publishers Weekly list of bestselling novels in the United States in the 1930s
