= Lace on Her Petticoat =

1949 play

- Written by: Aimée Stuart
- Original language: English
- Genre: Drama
- Setting: Scotland, 1885

Premiere
- Date premiered: 9 May 1949
- Place premiered: Connaught Theatre, Worthing

Lace on Her Petticoat is a play by the British writer Aimée Stuart. It takes place in a cottage on an island off the southwest coast of Scotland in the late Victorian era.

It premiered at the Connaught Theatre in Worthing before transferring to the Ambassadors Theatre in London's West End where it ran for 188 performances between 14 December 1950 and 26 June 1951. The original West End cast included Ellis Irving, David Keir, Muriel Aked, Perlita Neilson and Sophie Stewart. A 1951 production at the Booth Theatre on Broadway lasted for 79 performances.

== TV versions ==
The play was adapted for British television in 1952. It was also filmed for American TV the same year.

The play was adapted for British television in 1958 with Janet Munro who played a twelve year old. The Daily Telegraph called it "a play well suited to the condensing treatment of television."

== Bibliography ==
- Wearing, J.P. The London Stage 1950-1959: A Calendar of Productions, Performers, and Personnel. Rowman & Littlefield, 2014.
