= The Gentle Sex =

1943 British film by Leslie Howard

- Directed by: Leslie Howard; Maurice Elvey
- Written by: Moie Charles additional dialogue: Aimée Stuart
- Produced by: Derrick de Marney
- Starring: Joan Gates; Jean Gillie; Joan Greenwood; Joyce Howard; Rosamund John; Lilli Palmer; Barbara Waring
- Narrated by: Leslie Howard
- Cinematography: Robert Krasker
- Edited by: Charles Saunders
- Music by: John D. H. Greenwood
- Production companies: Derrick De Marney Productions; Two Cities Films
- Distributed by: General Film Distributors
- Release date: 15 April 1943
- Running time: 92 minutes
- Country: United Kingdom
- Language: English

The Gentle Sex is a 1943 British black-and-white romantic comedy-drama war film, directed by Leslie Howard and Maurice Elvey and narrated by Howard. It was written by Moie Charles and produced by Concanen Productions, Two Cities Films, and Derrick de Marney. It was Howard's last film before his death.

== Synopsis ==
The documentary-drama follows seven women from different backgrounds who meet at an Auxiliary Territorial Service training camp. "Gentle" British girls, they are now doing their bit to help out in World War II: driving lorries and manning ack-ack batteries. Leslie Howard provides gently ironic narration throughout the film.

The girls are allowed to socialise at organised dances with local male troops. Music is contemporary (big band swing) and dancing includes the jitterbug. Two of the girls find romance. The narrator points out that "war is never kind to lovers".

== Cast ==
Best source is at BFI:

=== 7 of the gentle sex played by ===
- Joan Gates as Gwen Hayden
- Jean Gillie as Dot Hopkins
- Joan Greenwood as Betty Miller
- Joyce Howard as Anne Lawrence
- Rosamund John as Maggie Fraser
- Lilli Palmer as Erna Debruski
- Barbara Waring as Joan Simpson

=== Other characters ===
- John Justin as Flying Officer David Sheridan
- Mary Jerrold as Mrs Sheridan
- John Laurie as Corporal Alexander Balfour
- Elliott Mason as Mrs Fraser
- Harry Welchman as Captain Ferrier
- Miles Malleson as train guard
- Jimmy Hanley as first soldier on train (credited as Jimmie Hanley)
- Meriel Forbes as Davis, junior commander
- Rosalyn Boulter as Sally, telephonist
- Tony Bazell as Ted
- Frederick Leister as Colonel Lawrence
- Everley Gregg as Miss Simpson
- Noreen Craven as convoy sergeant
- Frederick Peisley as second soldier on train
- Ronald Shiner (as Ronnie Shiner) as the racing punter in the pub
- Roland Pertwee as captain
- Nicholas Stuart as Canadian private
- Frank Atkinson as lorry driver in the cafe
- Peter Cotes as Taffy
- Maud Dunham as Mrs Miller
- Leslie Howard as narrator ("observations of a mere man")
- and various appearances by members of HM Forces

== Box office ==
Kinematograph Weekly listed a series of films that were "runners up" in its survey of the most popular films in Britain in 1943: The Gentle Sex, The Lamp Still Burns, Dear Octopus and The Adventures of Tartu.

== Critical reception ==
The Monthly Film Bulletin wrote: "The emotional content is suggested more often than fully exploited, but it is so true and of such general appeal that the story holds the interest. It is a story which demands considerable directorial ingeniousness – bringing together the threads of these seven lives, separating them, reuniting them. By picking the girls out of a Victoria station crowd with camera and commentary (spoken by himself), Howard has adroitly given each of them background depth almost before the film is under way. ... The strength of the film, however, is the subtlety of its direction. A number of small details rather than one obvious statement are preferred in making essential points of story, of character or of background fact. Judicious mixing of sound and a wide variety of camera angles are used to enrich for the initiated and convey to the uninitiated the experiences of A.T.S. life. ... Remarkable also is the smooth blending of the seven professional actresses with the reallife A.T.S. personnel with whom they train, drill, work and live."

The Radio Times Guide to Films gave the film 3/5 stars, writing: "Viewed today, this drama seems patronising in its depiction of the contribution made to the war effort by seven socially diverse women, who volunteer for service on the same day. Yet it served its purpose both as a morale booster and as a recruitment advertisement, thanks to some astute appeals to the patriotic spirit and some spunky acting by a top-notch cast."

In British Sound Films: The Studio Years 1928–1959 David Quinlan rated the film as "very good", writing: "A well-made film: the emotional content rings true, and the action scenes – the air raid, an all-night lorry convoy – are vividly done."

Leslie Halliwell said: "Unassuming war propaganda, quite pleasantly done and historically very interesting."

TV Guide noted "some lucid and funny moments in a capable and intelligent production for its time."

Billy Mowbray wrote for Film 4, "if only social history was this good at school. Funny, fascinating and probably unlike any film you've seen before, The Gentle Sex is a bona fide cultural treasure."
