= Tawny Pipit (film) =

- Niall MacGinnis and Rosamund John
- Directed by: Bernard Miles; Charles Saunders
- Written by: Bernard Miles; Charles Saunders
- Produced by: Bernard Miles; William Sistrom
- Starring: Bernard Miles; Rosamund John; Niall MacGinnis
- Cinematography: Eric Cross; Ray Sturgess
- Edited by: Douglas Myers
- Music by: Noel Mewton-Wood
- Production company: Two Cities Films (as a Prestige Production)
- Distributed by: General Film Distributors
- Release date: 28 April 1944
- Running time: 81 minutes
- Country: United Kingdom
- Language: English
- Budget: under £150,000

Tawny Pipit is a 1944 British comedy film directed by Bernard Miles and Charles Saunders and starring Miles, Rosamund John and Niall MacGinnis. It was written by Miles and Saunders and produced by Prestige Productions. It tells of how the residents of a small English village collaborate when the nest of a pair of rare tawny pipits is discovered there.

It is one of the first films to have a nature conservation theme: with one scene featuring a girl standing in front of a line of Covenanter tanks to prevent military training from disturbing the birds. Balanced against the conservation themes it also includes practices that have been made illegal since, such as collecting rare bird eggs.

== Plot ==
During the Second World War, Jimmy Bancroft, a fighter pilot just released from hospital and his nurse (now his girlfriend) Hazel Broome are on a walking tour through the countryside. They arrive at the (fictional) village of Lipsbury Lea, being keen birdwatchers, discover that a pair of tawny pipits, which are rarely seen in England, are nesting nearby. News of the rare discovery spreads and groups of twitchers arrive from the cities to try to see the birds. Jimmy and Hazel enlist several locals to protect the nesting site until the eggs hatch. The villagers do so with great enthusiasm, led by the fiery retired Colonel Barton-Barrington and the Reverend Mr. Kingsley.

The field where the nest is located (known locally as the pinfold) is due to be ploughed by order of the county's war agricultural executive committee (the "war ag"), and a delegation to the Ministry of Agriculture in London fails to get the order rescinded. The minister was Barton-Barrington's "fag" at his public school, Marlborough, and personally intervenes to save the field from being ploughed. During the period the village is visited by a female Russian soldier campaigning for public support during the German occupation of Russia. She says that Russia also respects the countryside and farming. The colonel presents her with a sniper rifle.

The eggs duly hatch but not before a plot to steal them on behalf of an unscrupulous dealer is foiled by an alert army corporal (a professional ornithologist) who is serving nearby. At the end the village give thanks in the local church while a Spitfire flown by Jimmy tips its wing in a low level flight over the village. The plane has been renamed "anthus campestris" (Tawny Pipit).

== Cast ==
- Bernard Miles as Colonel Barton-Barrington
- Rosamund John as Hazel Broome
- Niall MacGinnis as Jimmy Bancroft
- Jean Gillie as Nancy Forester, a "land girl" (member of the Women's Land Army)
- Lucie Mannheim as Russian soldier
- Christopher Steele as Rev. Mr. Kingsley
- Brefni O'Rorke as Uncle Arthur
- George Carney as Whimbrel
- Wylie Watson as Crasker
- John Salew as Pickering
- Marjorie Rhodes as Mrs. Pickering
- John Rae as Mr. Dougall
- Ann Wilton as Miss Pennyman
- Ernest Butcher as Tommy Fairchild
- Grey Blake as Captain Dawson
- Bill Wilson as tank driver
- Ian Fleming as schoolmaster
- Katie Johnson as Miss Pyman
- Joan Sterndale-Bennett as Rose
- Stuart Latham as Corporal Philpotts

== Authenticity ==
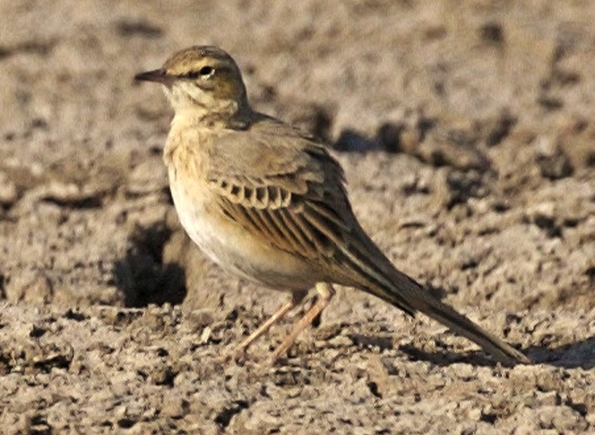
A tawny pipit

James Fisher and Julian Huxley were credited as ornithological advisers for the film. Nevertheless, Eric Hosking's footage of the pipits was actually of meadow pipits because he could not get genuine tawny pipits from German-occupied Europe.

== Production ==
Location filming was done in Lower Slaughter in the Cotswolds. The precise whereabouts of the fictional Lipsbury Lea are not specified, but the local pub serves ales brewed in Burford, which is in Oxfordshire, close to the boundary with Gloucestershire. The railway station seen briefly in the film was Stow-on-the-Wold.

== Propaganda value ==
By the time the film was released (not until 1947 in the United States), the threat of invasion had subsided, but it was still seen as an effective piece of propaganda. It showed the love of the English for their country and all classes of society uniting for the common good. A subplot shows Barton-Barrington presenting his Browning Automatic Rifle to Corporal Bokolova (Lucie Mannheim), a Russian soldier on a goodwill tour, whilst giving a fiery speech about some foreigners being "jolly good chaps".

== Reception ==
The Monthly Film Bulletin wrote: "This pleasant little comedy provides a gentle skit on village life. Bernard Miles is inclined to make Colonel BartonBarrington just a shade too blimpish, and the same criticism is true of Christopher Steele's vicar, who is just a little too much the stage conception. But for the rest, the village people behave with that faint suspicion of the townsman which is characteristic of them, and the trivial details of village life are picked out and gently mocked. Niall MacGinnis and Rosamund John as the young man and woman are not called upon greatly to exert themselves, but there are neat sketches from Lucie Mansheim as a Russian sniper making a goodwill tour and from John Schofield as a tank driver. Much of the script is above the average of British films, and the location shots are excellent."

Kine Weekly wrote: "Soothing, unhurried romantic comedy drama of the English countryside ... Bernard Miles, who is also co-director tends to overact as the peppery Colonel Barton-Barrington ... The long supporting cast is also good, but it's Mr and Mrs. Tawny Pipit's picture. The close-ups of the Tawny Pipit are delightful, and so are the pictorial backgrounds. The scene of a meeting of the elderly members of the Association, too, is good satire, but much of the village by-play is tinged with obvious propaganda, The rather lumbering frame does not, however, seriously rob the authentic basic portrait of bird-life of instruction or charm."

Variety wrote: "If the Academy had an award for the year's worst titled film, this one would cop the Oscar without a doubt, Despite this handicap, Tawny Pipit has everything it takes to make a boxoffice hit. The tawny pipit is a rare bird and this fim is frankly a glorification of ornithology. With such a theme, a picture could hardly be expected 'to have much appeal, but it actually has ... Success for the film is assured because of a cast of such established boxoffice favorites ...All are aided by more than usually intelligent direction of Charles Saunders and. Bernard Miles."

The New York Times wrote, "Seldom does such a piece of unsophisticated charm and humor reach the screen, but this is one that is presented in such an utterly beguiling fashion that it would be a grave error not to see it."

Rosamund John was later to say, "Rank didn't think they would be able to sell it to America so it was stashed away for a while. When it was shown, it was wildly popular, because it was everything the Americans thought of as being English."
