= My Son, My Son (TV series) =

- Genre: Drama
- Based on: My Son, My Son by Howard Spring
- Written by: Julian Bond
- Directed by: Peter Cregeen
- Starring: Michael Williams; Frank Grimes; Kate Binchy
- Composer: Rick Wakeman
- Country of origin: United Kingdom
- Original language: English
- No. of series: 1
- No. of episodes: 8

Production
- Running time: 55 minutes
- Production company: BBC

Original release
- Network: BBC One
- Release: 18 March – 6 May 1979

My Son, My Son is a British television drama series which first aired on BBC 1 between 18 March and 6 May 1979. It is an adaptation of the 1938 novel of the same title by Howard Spring.

== Selected cast ==
- Michael Williams as William Essex
- Frank Grimes as Dermot O'Riorden
- Kate Binchy as Sheila O'Riorden
- Patsy Rowlands as Annie Suthurst
- Patrick Ryecart as Oliver Essex
- Ciaran Madden as Livia Vaynol
- Prue Clarke as Maeve O'Riorden
- Gerard Murphy as Rory O'Riorden
- Maurice Denham as Captain Judas
- Angela Harding as Maggie Donnelly
- Grégoire Aslan as Josef Wertheim
- Julian Fellowes as Pogson
- Matthew Long as Sawle
- Neale Goodrum as Martin
- Alan MacNaughtan as Sir Charles Blatch
- Patrick Waldron as Kevin Donnelly
- Sherrie Hewson as Nellie Essex
- Joy Nichols as Josie Wertheim
- Elizabeth Seal as Mary Latter
- Derek Fowlds as Newbiggen
- Cyril Luckham as Reverend Oliver
- Ivor Salter as Summerways
- Willoughby Goddard as Mr. Moscrop
- Joyce Carey as Mrs. Bendall

== Bibliography ==
- Ellen Baskin. Serials on British Television, 1950-1994. Scolar Press, 1996.
