= These Lovers Fled Away =

1955 novel by Howard Spring

- First edition (UK)
- Author: Howard Spring
- Language: English
- Genre: Drama
- Publisher: Collins (UK); Harper & Brothers (US)
- Publication date: 1955
- Media type: Print

These Lovers Fled Away is a 1955 novel by the British writer Howard Spring. While some events take place in the same fictitious Yorkshire town as the 1957 novel Time and the Hour, the two books have no other connection. The title is taken from the poem The Eve of St Agnes by John Keats.

== Bibliography ==
- George Watson & Ian R. Willison. The New Cambridge Bibliography of English Literature, Volume 4. CUP, 1972.
