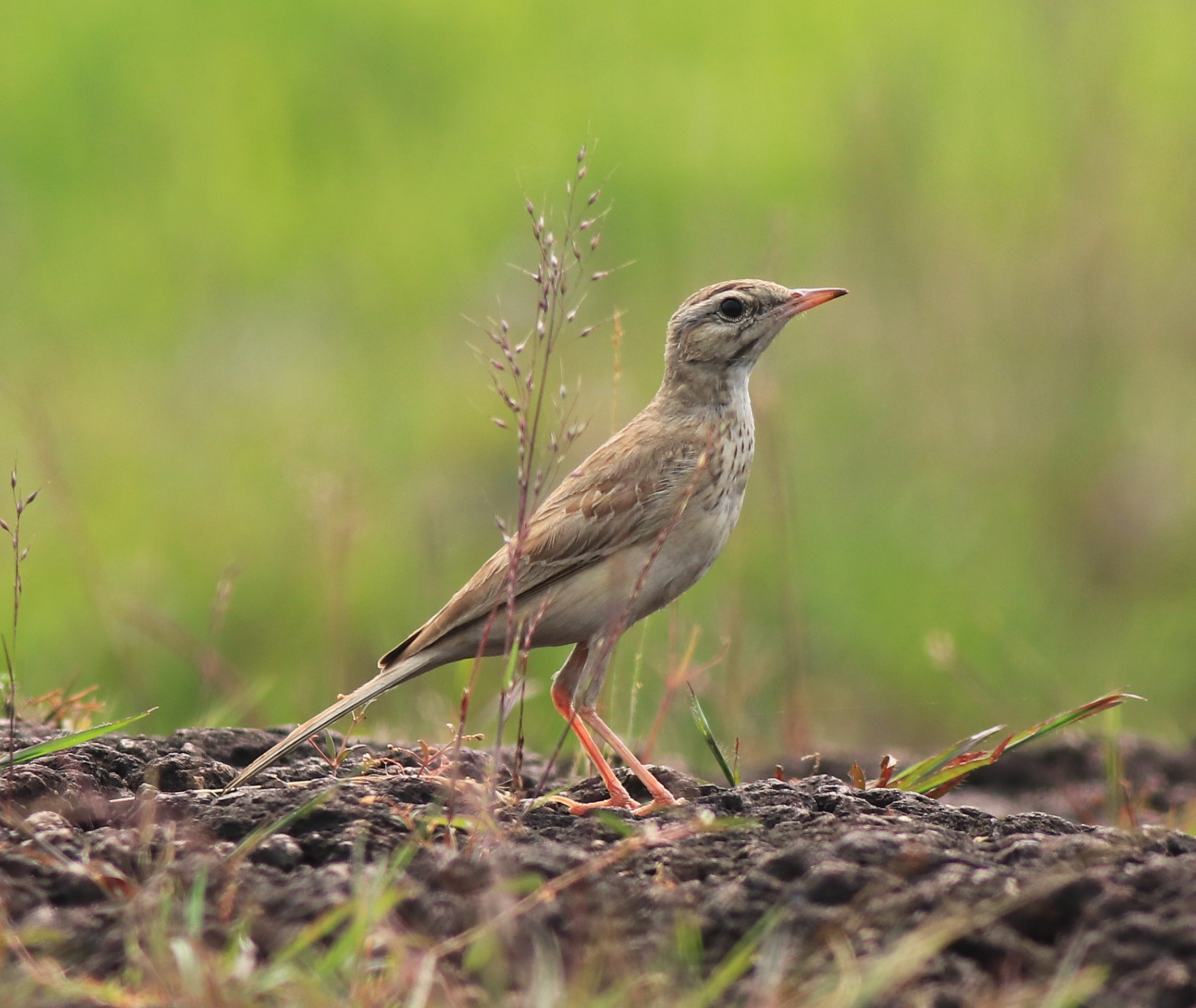
- Tawny pipit, Kerala, India

Conservation status
- Least Concern (IUCN 3.1)

Scientific classification
- Kingdom: Animalia
- Phylum: Chordata
- Class: Aves
- Order: Passeriformes
- Family: Motacillidae
- Genus: Anthus
- Species: A. campestris

Binomial name
- Anthus campestris (Linnaeus, 1758)
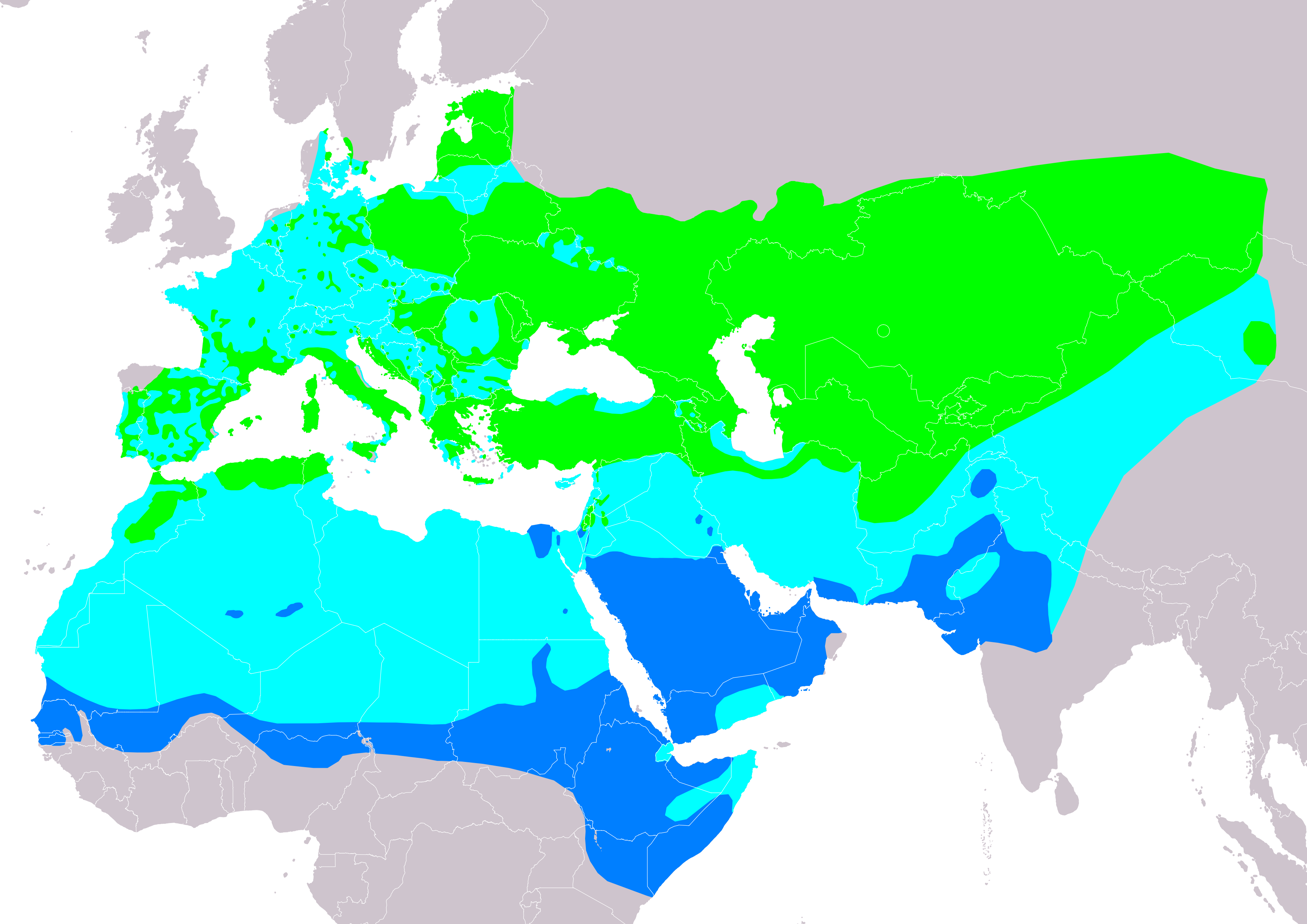
- Range of A. campestris Breeding Passage Non-breeding

Synonyms
- Alauda campestris Linnaeus, 1758

= Tawny pipit =

Species of bird

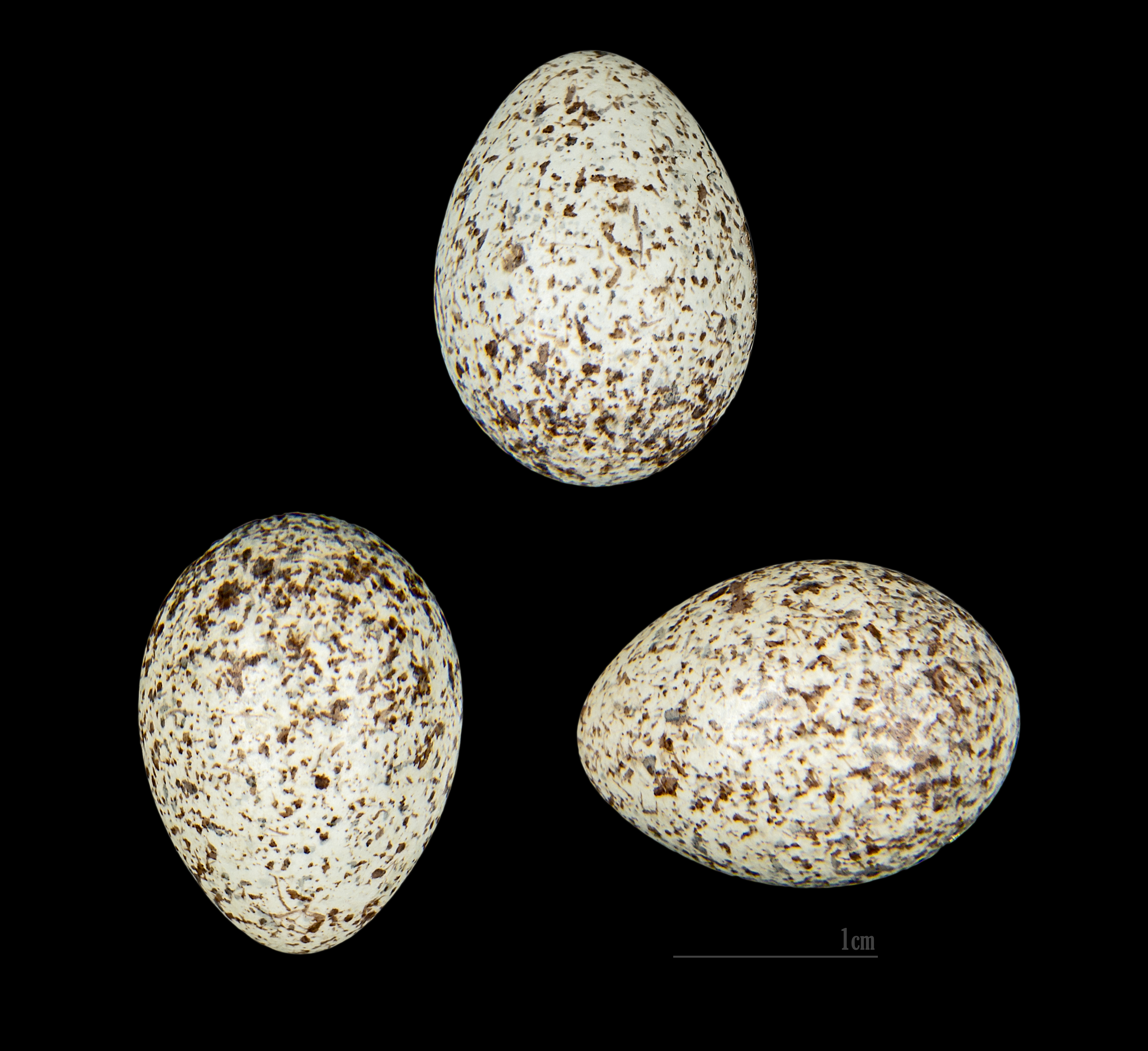
Anthus campestris MHNT

The tawny pipit (Anthus campestris) is a medium-large passerine bird which breeds in much of the central Palearctic from northwest Africa and Portugal to Central Siberia and on to Inner Mongolia. It is a migrant moving in winter to tropical Africa and the Indian subcontinent.

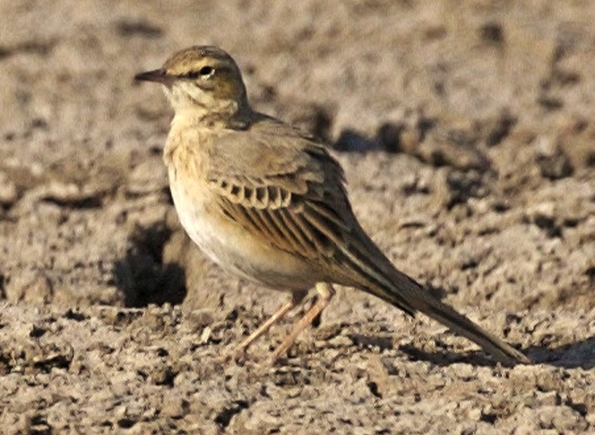
Overwintering in India

== Taxonomy ==
The tawny pipit was formally described in 1758 by the Swedish naturalist Carl Linnaeus in the tenth edition of his Systema Naturae. He placed it with the larks and pipits in the genus Alauda and coined the binomial name Alauda campestris. Linnaeus specified the type locality as Europe but this has been restricted to Sweden. The specific epithet campestris is Latin meaning "of the fields", from campus meaning "field". The tawny pipit is now one of over 40 species placed in the genus Anthus that was introduced in 1805 by German naturalist Johann Matthäus Bechstein. The species is considered to be monotypic: no subspecies are recognised.

== Description ==
This is a large pipit, 16 centimetres (6.3 in) long with wing-span 25–28 centimetres (9.8–11.0 in), but is an undistinguished looking species on the ground, mainly sandy brown above and pale below. It is very similar to Richard's pipit, but is slightly smaller, has shorter wings, tail and legs and a narrower dark bill. It is also less streaked. Its flight is strong and direct, and it gives a characteristic "schip" call, higher pitched than Richard's.

Its song is a short repetition of a loud disyllabic chir-ree chir-ree.

In south Asia, in winter some care must be taken to distinguish this from other large pipits which winter or are resident in the area, including Richard's pipit, Blyth's pipit and paddyfield pipit.

== Behaviour and ecology ==
=== Breeding ===
The breeding habitat is dry open country including semi-deserts. The nest is on the ground, with 3-6 eggs being laid. They are incubated mainly by the female until they hatch after around 12 days. The nestlings are fed by both parents.

=== Food and feeding ===
The tawny pipit is insectivorous, like its relatives.

== In culture ==
The plot of the 1944 film Tawny Pipit is about the rare event of a pair of tawny pipits breeding in England. Eric Hosking's footage of the pipits was actually of meadow pipits because he could not get genuine tawny pipits from German-occupied Europe.
