= Rosamund John =

English film & stage actress (1913–1998)

- Born: Nora Rosamund Jones; 19 October 1913; Tottenham, London, England
- Died: 27 October 1998 (aged 85); Clapham, London, England
- Occupation: Actress
- Years active: 1934–1957
- Spouses: Russell Lloyd (m. 1943; div. 1949) John Silkin (m. 1950; died 1987)

Rosamund John (19 October 1913 – 27 October 1998), born Nora Rosamund Jones, was an English film and stage actress.

== Early life ==
Nora Jones was born and brought up in Tottenham in north London, the daughter of Frederick Henry Jones, a wine merchant's clerk, and his wife, Edith Elizabeth (née Elliott). She was educated at Tottenham high school before studying for the theatre at the Embassy School of Acting.

== Career ==
At the age of nineteen, John was introduced to actor–director Milton Rosmer, who cast her in several minor stage roles before casting her in his film The Secret of the Loch (1934). Following several more years of stage work she was cast opposite Leslie Howard in The First of the Few (1942). This led to her being cast in Howard's next film as a director, The Gentle Sex (1943). Howard cast John in her next film The Lamp Still Burns (1943), which he produced, but he was killed during the film's production when his plane was shot down returning from Lisbon.

John soon became one of Britain's most popular screen stars, second only to Margaret Lockwood as Britain's favourite female star in 1944, and credited her career ascendance to Howard. She next starred in the rural wartime comedy Tawny Pipit (1944), made by Two Cities Films, which, according to John, went on to be popular with American audiences as "it was everything the Americans thought of as being English."

John co-starred in Anthony Asquith's wartime drama The Way to the Stars (1945), following which she appeared in the medical wartime thriller Green for Danger (1946). 1947 saw her star with James Mason in The Upturned Glass (1947), with Michael Redgrave in the Boulting Brothers' political drama Fame is the Spur (1947) and with Patricia Roc in the drama When the Bough Breaks (1947).

== Personal life ==
John was twice married, first to film editor Russell Lloyd, from 1943 to 1949, with whom she had a son named John, and then to politician John Silkin from 1950 to 1987, with whom she had her second son, Rory.

She died at a nursing home in Clapham, London in 1998, aged 85.

== Filmography ==
Year	Title	Notes
1934	The Secret of the Loch	
1939	Lucky to Me	
1942	The First of the Few	Titled Spitfire in the USA
1943	The Gentle Sex	
1943	The Lamp Still Burns	
1944	Tawny Pipit	
1945	The Way to the Stars	
1946	Green for Danger	
1947	The Upturned Glass	
1947	Fame Is the Spur	
1947	When the Bough Breaks	
1949	No Place for Jennifer	
1950	She Shall Have Murder	
1952	Never Look Back	
1953	Street Corner	
1957	Operation Murder	

== Sources ==
- Halliwell, Leslie and John Walker. Halliwell's Who's Who in the Movies. Harper Resource, 2001.ISBN 0-06-093507-3.
