= Some May Live =

1967 British film by Vernon Sewell

- Opening title
- Directed by: Vernon Sewell
- Screenplay by: David T. Chantler
- Produced by: Clive Sharp; Peter Snell
- Starring: Joseph Cotten; Martha Hyer; Peter Cushing
- Cinematography: Ray Parslow; Ray Sturgess
- Edited by: Gordon Pilkington
- Music by: Cyril Ornadel
- Production companies: Foundation Pictures; Krasne Entertainments
- Distributed by: Butcher's Film Service (UK)
- Release date: April 1967 (UK)
- Running time: 89 minutes
- Country: United Kingdom
- Language: English

Some May Live ( also known as In Saigon Some May Live) is a 1967 British war film directed by Vernon Sewell and starring Peter Cushing, Joseph Cotten and Martha Hyer. It was written by David T. Chantler and shot at Twickenham Studios.

== Plot ==
During the Vietnam War, a security leak in Saigon has to be plugged, when American decoder Kate Meredith is faced with the dilemma of her husband pressuring her to give him information.

== Cast ==
- Peter Cushing as John Meredith
- Joseph Cotten as Colonel Woodward
- Martha Hyer as Kate Meredith
- John Ronane as Captain Elliott Thomas
- David Spenser as Inspector Sung
- Alec Mango as Ducrai
- Walter Brown as Major Matthews
- Kim Smith as Allan Meredith
- Burnell Tucker as Lawrence
- Carol Cleveland as minor role

== Critical reception ==
The Monthly Film Bulletin wrote: "A contrived melodrama made all the more unconvincing by mediocre performances. Martha Hyer in particular is unequal to the demands of her part. Vernon Sewell's direction is quite without style."

Leonard Maltin gave the film two stars, calling it an "Unexciting suspenser."
