= Henry V (1944 film) =

1944 British film by Laurence Olivier

- British film poster
- Directed by: Laurence Olivier
- Screenplay by: Dallas Bower; Alan Dent; Laurence Olivier
- Based on: Henry V (1599 play) by William Shakespeare
- Produced by: Filippo Del Giudice; Laurence Olivier
- Starring: Laurence Olivier; Renée Asherson; Robert Newton; Leslie Banks
- Cinematography: Robert Krasker
- Edited by: Reginald Beck
- Music by: William Walton
- Production company: Two Cities Films
- Distributed by: Eagle-Lion Distributors Limited
- Release date: 22 November 1944 (London)
- Running time: 136 minutes
- Country: United Kingdom
- Languages: English; French
- Budget: £475,708 (or $2 million)
- Box office: over $2 million

Henry V (Note: Titled-on screen as The Chronicle History of King Henry the Fift with his battell fought at Agincourt in France — derived from the title of the 1600 quarto edition of the play, though changing the spelling from "Agin Court". The spelling "Fift" is as the original.) is a 1944 British film adaptation of William Shakespeare's play. The film is directed, co-written, produced by, and stars Laurence Olivier in the title role. It was Olivier's first film directorial effort. The cast also features Renée Asherson as Katherine, Robert Newton as Pistol, and Leslie Banks as the chorus. The play was adapted for the screen by Olivier, Dallas Bower, and Alan Dent. The score was composed by William Walton.

The film was made near the end of World War II and was intended as a morale booster for Britain. Consequently, it was partly funded by the British government. The film was originally "dedicated to the 'Commandos and Airborne Troops of Great Britain the spirit of whose ancestors it has been humbly attempted to recapture.'"

Henry V was produced by Two Cities Films and distributed by Eagle-Lion. It premiered on 22 November 1944. It was both a critical and commercial success, and has been credited with legitimizing screen adaptations of Shakespeare. It was nominated for four Academy Awards, including Best Picture and Best Actor for Olivier. The director/star also received an Honorary Oscar for "his Outstanding achievement as actor, producer and director in bringing Henry V to the screen."

In 1999, the British Film Institute ranked Henry V in its list of Top 100 British films, at number 18.

== Plot ==
The action moves from a performance of the play, Henry V, in 1600, transitioning to the Battle of Agincourt in 1415, then back to the play.

A panorama of London in 1600 is shown and then the viewpoint travels to the Globe Theatre where the audience is being seated. The Chorus enters and implores the audience to use their imagination to visualise the setting of the play. Then is seen, up on a balcony, two clergymen, the Archbishop of Canterbury and the Bishop of Ely, discussing the current affairs of state. Henry then enters, and discusses with his nobles the state of France. A gift is delivered to Henry from the French Dauphin. The gift turns out to be tennis balls, a jibe at Henry's youth and inexperience. Offended, Henry sends the French ambassador away, and prepares to claim the French throne, a throne that he believes is rightfully his.

Then characters from Shakespeare's Henry IV plays, Corporal Nym, Bardolph, and Pistol, are shown. These characters resolve to join Henry's army; however, before they do, Falstaff, another returning character, and one of the King's former mentors, dies. At this point, the action moves to Southampton and out of the Globe.

At Southampton, the fleet embarks, and lands in France, beginning a campaign that tears through France to Harfleur, to which Henry's forces lay siege. At the siege, Henry delivers his first rousing speech to his troops: "Once more... unto the breach! Dear friends, once more!" The troops charge on Harfleur, and take it as their own.

The troops then march to Agincourt, meeting the French forces. The night before the impending battle, Henry wanders around the camp in disguise, to find out what the men think of him. The next day, before the battle, Henry delivers his famous Saint Crispin's Day speech.

The action transitions from the Globe to the fields of the Battle of Agincourt in 1415. The English archers let forth a volley of arrows that cuts deeply into the French numbers. The French, weighed down by their heavy armour, are caught in the fresh mud of the field, and are bogged down, which gives the English troops ample opportunity to ride out and fight them on equal terms. The French Dauphin, seeing this disadvantage, watches as several bodyguards and noblemen including the Constable of France ride toward the English camp and kill all the boys and squires, prompting a tearful Fluellen to cry that "this is expressly against the law of arms". Henry is angered by this and rides out to meet the French Constable, whom he defeats in personal combat.

The battle is won. Henry comes to discuss peace and then woos the Princess Katherine. His success means that France is now under the control of England, as the French King, Charles VI, adopts Henry as his successor. In the final moments, the viewpoint returns to the Globe Theatre and the play, where the actors take their bows.

== Cast ==
- Laurence Olivier as King Henry V of England. Henry is the King of England who, believing he has a justifiable claim to the throne of France derived from his great-grandfather Edward III, invades France, a decision that is further strengthened when the French Dauphin sends an emissary to insult the young king. He is a warrior king, who commands his troops from the front. This was Laurence Olivier's third Oscar-nominated performance, and his second appearance in a Shakespeare film.
- Renée Asherson as Princess Katherine. Katherine is wooed by Henry and becomes his wife.
- Robert Newton as Ancient Pistol.
- Leslie Banks as the Chorus. The Chorus sets the scene for the play and film, giving the required exposition. Leslie Banks was an actor who had appeared with Olivier in Fire Over England.
- Felix Aylmer as the Archbishop of Canterbury. The Archbishop helps tempt the King into his conquest of France. Olivier stages this scene partly as comedy, with the actor who plays the Archbishop in the Globe Theatre comically jumbling all his papers and losing his place in the script. Aylmer had appeared with Olivier in As You Like It, and would subsequently appear in Hamlet.
- Robert Helpmann as the Bishop of Ely. The Bishop helps the Archbishop in his persuasion of the King. In the film, he appears as a comic figure.
- Vernon Greeves as The English Herald.
- Gerald Case as the Earl of Westmoreland.
- Griffith Jones as the Earl of Salisbury. Salisbury is a commander who fights at Harfleur and Agincourt.
- Morland Graham as Sir Thomas Erpingham. Erpingham plays a decisive role in the Battle of Agincourt.
- Nicholas Hannen as the Duke of Exeter. The Duke is the uncle to the king.
- Michael Warre as the Duke of Gloucester. Gloucester is the brother to the king.
- Ralph Truman as Mountjoy, The French Herald.
- Ernest Thesiger as Duke of Berri, French Ambassador.
- Frederick Cooper as Corporal Nym.
- Roy Emerton as Lieutenant Bardolph.
- Freda Jackson as Mistress Quickly.
- George Cole as the Boy.
- George Robey as Sir John Falstaff. Falstaff is a companion to Henry.
- Harcourt Williams as King Charles VI of France. Charles is the sick and old King of France. Williams later appeared as the First Player in the Laurence Olivier Hamlet, but his monologue on the death of Priam was omitted from the film.
- Russell Thorndike as the Duke of Bourbon. Bourbon fights at Agincourt and is captured. Thorndike appeared in all three of Olivier's Shakespearean films.
- Leo Genn as The Constable of France. The Constable was the commander of the French forces at Agincourt, and is killed by King Henry himself during the battle.
- Francis Lister as the Duke of Orleans. Orleans is a nobleman who fights at Agincourt.
- Max Adrian as The Dauphin. The Dauphin is the cocky joint-commander of the forces at Agincourt.
- Jonathan Field as The French Messenger.
- Esmond Knight as Fluellen, Welsh Captain in the English Army. Knight appeared in all three of Olivier's Shakespearean films, as well as his The Prince and the Showgirl.
- Michael Shepley as Gower, Captain in the English Army.
- John Laurie as Jamy, Scottish Captain in the English Army. Laurie appeared in all three of Olivier's Shakespearean films.
- Niall MacGinnis as MacMorris, Irish Captain in the English Army.
- Frank Tickle as The Governor of Harfleur.
- Ivy St. Helier as Alice.
- Janet Burnell as Queen Isabel of France. Isabel is the wife of Charles.
- Brian Nissen as Court, Soldier in the English Army.
- Arthur Hambling as Bates, Soldier in the English Army.
- Jimmy Hanley as Williams, Soldier in the English Army.
- Ernest Hare as A Priest. The priest weds Henry and Katherine.
- Valentine Dyall as the Duke of Burgundy. A great power in Europe, he serves as mediator between the kings of England and France.

== Production ==
Winston Churchill instructed Olivier to fashion the film as morale-boosting propaganda for British troops fighting World War II. The making and release of the film coincided with the Allied invasion of Normandy and push into France. An early preview trailer of the film showed contemporary London just before cutting to the film's aerial footage of London in 1600. The film was meant to cost £350,000 but ended up costing nearly £500,000.

=== Setting ===
Much of the film's impact comes from the Technicolor cinematography (using the only Technicolor camera in the U.K. at the time), spectacular period costumes and a unique blend of stylized settings, miniatures and location shooting. The film begins with a handbill floating out of the sky setting the date—the first of May 1600–and the occasion. This dissolves into detailed miniature model of London, with boats moving on the Thames. The camera pulls away from the Tower, gleaming white in the sun, and moves past London Bridge (crowded with buildings) to aim across the river at the densely packed city studded with churches, stretching into the distance, until St. Paul's (as it was then) can be seen. The camera pauses for a beat and then moves back to zoom in on one of the two round theatres, where a man is raising a flag inscribed The Globe Playhouse, showing that a performance is imminent. Then we go into the theatre for a vivid recreation of a production of the play as performed at that time, complete with hecklers and an annoying rain shower. The Chorus (a single actor) invokes the audience's imaginations, and when the action in the play moves to Southampton, we enter the world of the Trés Riches Heures of the Duc de Berry, a late medieval Book of Hours. Costumes and hair styles are authentic, and female parts are now played by women, as when Mistress Quickly delivers the news of Falstaff's death and joins other women in farewelling the soldiers.

The Chorus now invokes our imagination to fly past the fleet, barely visible far below in a Channel filled with fog, to the court of France, where Charles VI is attended by various nobles, including the "Duke of Berri", who is examining an illuminated volume with a magnifying glass in one hand and a clove-studded orange pomander in the other.

The setting becomes more natural in the dark night before Agincourt, when Henry walks through the sleeping camp to see how it goes with his men. The Battle of Agincourt takes place in a realistic setting (filmed in Ireland), in natural fields and forests, and dialogue is delivered from the backs of restive chargers. The troops singing Non Nobis and Te Deum at Henry's bidding march toward a painted rendition of the château, which fades out and fades in to the same image, blanketed in deep snow. The next set is a near-perfect rendition of the often-reproduced February page from the Trés Riches Heures, with Pistol taking the place of the man warming himself in the cottage (but with greater modesty).

We next see the negotiations for the Treaty of Troyes, and the setting is used to great effect to clarify and increase the impact of the Duke of Burgundy's speech about the sorry state of France. Although it is spring, the camera moves out through a window to pan over a painting of the neglected countryside, specifically illustrating each line of the speech and pausing on the neglected children before panning back up to the château. Henry's courtship of Princess Katherine weaves through a lacework of Gothic arches and is followed by their marriage. To the sound of a choir, backs to the camera, garbed in magnificent cloaks, they walk to their thrones. Cut abruptly to the Globe and a closeup on the actor playing Henry, the sound of applause and a pan to the boy playing Katherine (quite effectively) as they stand in gold painted capes with the rest of the cast kneeling in a tableau on either side of them.

The Chorus draws the curtain and speaks his epilogue, the camera pans up to the boychoir singing on the balcony and then cuts to the musicians in the gallery above them and moves further up to the narrow porch where a man brings down the flag and takes it inside. Cut to the model. The camera pulls all the way back and a handbill flies into view. The credits roll by, but before the picture ends we return to the model one last time as "The End" appears over a shot of the Tower of London gleaming white on the banks of the Thames.

=== Screenplay ===
Olivier intentionally left out some of Henry's harsher actions as Shakespeare portrayed them – such as his remorseless beheading of the three Southampton Plot traitors: Richard of Conisburgh, 3rd Earl of Cambridge; Henry Scrope, 3rd Baron Scrope of Masham; and Sir Thomas Grey; his threat to unleash his troops to rape and pillage Harfleur if the city refused to surrender; the cutting of the throats of French prisoners during the battle at Agincourt; as well as his refusal to stop the hanging of his old friend Bardolph for looting. The Chorus' last speech contains a melancholy reference to what came after and is not in the film:

Henry the Sixth, in infant bands crown'd King
Of France and England, did this king succeed;
Whose state so many had the managing,
That they lost France and made his England bleed:

A further scene was added to the play, in which Falstaff, on his death bed, imagines again his rejection by King Henry, which occurs in Henry IV Part 2. A recording of Olivier speaking lines from that play is heard.

=== Casting ===
Hundreds of locals were hired as extras for the Agincourt battle scenes filmed in neutral Ireland in 1943. The production company paid an additional pound to anyone who brought his own horse.

Olivier agreed not to appear in another film for 18 months to reduce any detraction from the promotion of Henry V. In return, he was paid £15,000, tax-free (about £460,000 in today's money).

Esmond Knight, who plays the patriotic Welsh soldier Fluellen was a wounded veteran of the war. He had been badly injured in 1941 while on active service on board HMS Prince of Wales when she was attacked by the Bismarck, and remained totally blind for two years. He had only just regained some sight in his right eye. Leo Genn, who played the Constable of France, was granted official leave from war service in the Royal Artillery in order to appear in the film. After the war, he served as an assistant prosecutor in the Belsen war crimes trials.

=== Filming ===
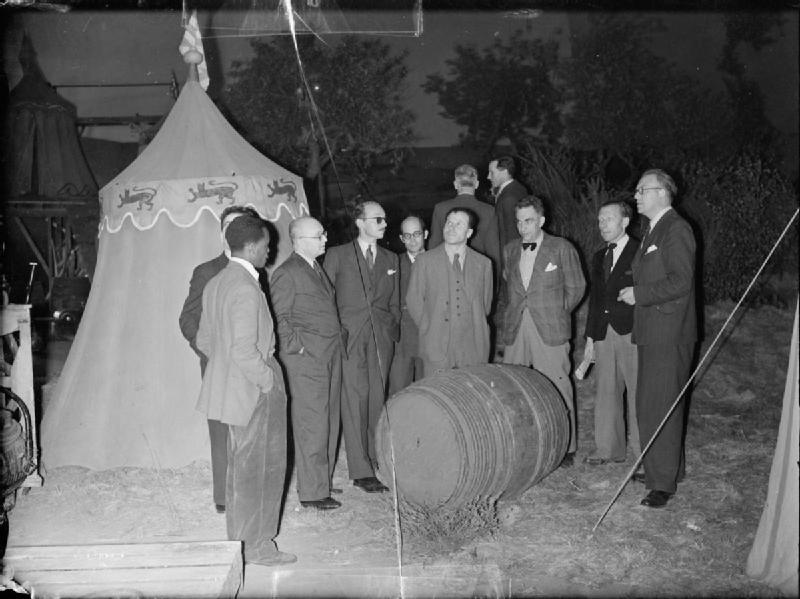
1942: Overseas newspaper correspondents inspect a beer barrel and tent 'at Agincourt', part of the set built for the production of 'Henry V' at Denham Studios.

The film was shot on location at the Powerscourt Estate in Enniskerry, County Wicklow, Ireland. The interior sets were constructed at the Denham Studios in Buckinghamshire, England. They were based on illustrations from the Très Riches Heures du Duc de Berry, the commissioner of which is also a character in the play.

The film, which was photographed in three-strip Technicolor, was hailed by critics for its ebulliently colourful sets and costumes, as well as for Olivier's masterful direction and acting. Pauline Kael called the movie "a triumph of color, music, spectacle and soaring heroic poetry". James Agee reported, in Time magazine's 8 April 1946 issue, that a remarkable 75 percent of the color footage shot was used in the final release.

In 2007, the film was digitally restored to High Definition format and re-released. As part of the BBC Summer of British Film series in 2007, it was shown at selected cinemas across the UK.

=== Film music ===
The score by William Walton is considered one of the greatest British film scores, and excerpts from it, such as the orchestral Suite from Henry V, have been performed in concert.

A recording of the score arranged by Christopher Palmer, with actor Christopher Plummer reading the speeches given by the Chorus, Henry V, and the Duke of Burgundy, was released in 1990 under the title Henry V: A Shakespeare Scenario. The score incorporates elements from a well-known vocal adaptation of French folk-songs called Chants d'Auvergne by Joseph Canteloube. Ralph Vaughan Williams had also suggested tunes to Walton that he had used in his brass band overture 'Henry V' of 1933 including 'Agincourt Song', 'Reveillez-vous, Picards' (Old French Marching Song) and William Byrd's 'The Earl of Oxford's March' all of which Walton used. The 2007 re-release of Sir Neville Marriner's recording of the score also includes original versions of earlier music by composers whose works were incorporated into the score, including selections from Canteloube's Chants d'Auvergne.

== Reception ==
According to Turner Classic Movies's Frank Miller, Olivier's Henry V was the first Shakespeare film to receive "both critical and popular acclaim." The British critics gave it a lukewarm welcome but word of mouth took care of that, and the film broke all records by running for 11 months in London. In 1946, a cagey release strategy in the United States was undoubtedly helped by the "ecstatic" reviews from U.S. critics, "hailing it as one of the screen's first great works of art and the most impressive directing debut since Orson Welles' Citizen Kane (1941)."

Miller adds that "Olivier won Best Actor awards from the New York Film Critics Circle and the National Review, also capturing the latter's Best Picture award and coming within a few votes of beating The Best Years of Our Lives (1946) for the New York Film Critics Award in that category."

Writing in The New Republic, film critic Manny Farber offered this appraisal of Olivier's performance:

The picture’s artistic value rests in the perfection of the portrait of a great medieval leader-type, the kind of power-happy, wily statesman who terrifies people today...Olivier sends chills down your back as he smiles at an insult; he makes you uneasy, talking in a charming, bland way of how necessary it is that there be a just reason for conquering France…his transformation during the war into a deeper, greater person is made evident in an almost magical way. Olivier’s real feat, though, is in having directed a film that is always as exciting, even more so, than the Shakespeare play.

The film was highly acclaimed around the world. James Agee, who reviewed it separately for three publications, called it "one of the cinema's great works of art". Agee continues: "Henry V is one of the great experiences in the history of motion pictures. It is not, to be sure, the greatest...But Henry V is a major achievement—this perfect marriage of great dramatic poetry with the greatest contemporary medium for expressing it." British critic Leslie Halliwell gave it four of four stars: "Immensely stirring, experimental and almost wholly successful production of Shakespeare on film, sturdy both in its stylization and its command of more conventional cinematic resources for the battle." Pauline Kael, writing of Olivier: "His production—it was his first time out as a film director—is a triumph of color, music, spectacle, and soaring heroic poetry, and, as an actor, he brings lungs, exultation, and a guileful wit to the role. The film has true charm."

=== Box office ===
According to Kinematograph Weekly the 'biggest winner' at the box office in 1945 Britain was The Seventh Veil, with "runners up" being (in release order), Madonna of the Seven Moons, Old Acquaintance, Frenchman's Creek, Mrs. Parkington, Arsenic and Old Lace, Meet Me in St. Louis, A Song to Remember, Since You Went Away, Here Come the Waves, Tonight and Every Night, Hollywood Canteen, They Were Sisters, The Princess and the Pirate, The Adventures of Susan, National Velvet, Mr. Skeffington, I Live in Grosvenor Square, Nob Hill, Perfect Strangers, The Valley of Decision, Conflict and Duffy's Tavern. British "runners up" were They Were Sisters, I Live in Grosvenor Square, Perfect Strangers, Madonna of the Seven Moons, Waterloo Road, Blithe Spirit, The Way to the Stars, I'll Be Your Sweetheart, Dead of Night, Waltz Time and Henry V.

Previous efforts to put Shakespeare on the screen included Douglas Fairbanks and Mary Pickford's 1929 The Taming of the Shrew; Max Reinhardt's 1935 A Midsummer Night's Dream for Warner Bros; a British film adaptation of As You Like It starring Olivier and Elisabeth Bergner and scored by William Walton; and MGM's 1936 Romeo and Juliet, directed by George Cukor and starring Norma Shearer and Leslie Howard. They had all misfired. According to TCM.com "After screening Romeo and Juliet (1936), Olivier realized that the standard Hollywood camera style, which included moving in for a close-up at climactic moments, didn't work for Shakespeare. In one scene, the close up had forced Norma Shearer to whisper one of her most passionate lines. Instead, he decided to film long speeches starting in close up and then moving the camera back as the actor's intensity grew. He also decided to treat the soliloquies not as direct addresses to the audience, but as interior monologues".

The film earned over $1 million in rentals in the US. However, due to its high production cost and Entertainment Tax it did not go into profit for Rank until 1949. It earned United Artists an estimated profit of $1.62 million. In 2007, Military History magazine listed this production 75th among "The 100 Greatest War Movies".

In 2025, The Hollywood Reporter listed Henry V as having the best stunts of 1946, the year that it was released in the United States on June 17.

=== Awards and nominations ===
Award	Category	Nominee(s)	Result	Ref.
Academy Awards	Best Motion Picture	United Artists Corp.	Nominated	
Academy Awards	Best Actor	Laurence Olivier	Nominated	
Academy Awards	Best Art Direction – Color	Paul Sheriff and Carmen Dillon	Nominated	
Academy Awards	Best Scoring of a Dramatic or Comedy Picture	William Walton	Nominated	
Academy Awards	Academy Honorary Award	Laurence Olivier	Won	
Kinema Junpo Awards	Best Foreign Language Film	Laurence Olivier	Won	
Nastro d'Argento	Best Foreign Director	Laurence Olivier	Won	
National Board of Review Awards	Best Film		Won	
National Board of Review Awards	Top Ten Films		Won	
National Board of Review Awards	Best Actor	Laurence Olivier	Won	
New York Film Critics Circle Awards	Best Film		Nominated	
New York Film Critics Circle Awards	Best Director	Laurence Olivier	Nominated	
New York Film Critics Circle Awards	Best Actor	Laurence Olivier	Won	
Picturegoer Awards	Best Actor	Laurence Olivier	Won	
Venice International Film Festival	International Critics Award (Special Mention)	Laurence Olivier	Won	

== See also ==
- BFI Top 100 British films
- List of films with a 100% rating on Rotten Tomatoes, a film review aggregator website

== Sources ==
- Farber, Manny. 2009. Farber on Film: The Complete Film Writings of Manny Farber. Edited by Robert Polito. Library of America. ISBN 978-1-59853-050-6

=== Bibliography ===
- The Great British Films, Jerry Vermilye, 1978, Citadel Press, ISBN 0-8065-0661-X
- Sargeant, Amy. British Cinema: a Critical History. London: BFI Publishing, 2005.
