= Sharon Maughan =

British actress (born 1950)

- Born: Sharon Patricia Maughan; 22 June 1950 (age 76); West Derby, Liverpool, Lancashire, England
- Occupation: Actress
- Years active: 1971–present
- Spouse: Trevor Eve (m. 1980)
- Children: 3, including Alice Eve

Sharon Patricia Maughan (born 22 June 1950) is a British actress. She became internationally recognised in the 1980s from the Gold Blend couple television advertisements for Nescafé instant coffee (Taster's Choice in the United States), alongside actor Anthony Head. Her credits include She's Out of My League, MacGyver, Inspector Morse, Hannay, and Murder, She Wrote. She made it to the semi-final of Celebrity MasterChef in 2011.

== Early life ==
Sharon Maughan was born in Liverpool, to a working class family of Irish descent from the province of Connacht in the west of Ireland, and raised in Kirkby, Lancashire, with her four siblings. She got her first taste of acting in plays at the all-girl Catholic Comprehensive School, St Gregory's School in Southdene, Kirkby. At the age of 17, she was awarded a scholarship to study acting at Royal Academy of Dramatic Art, graduating in 1971 with an Acting (RADA) Diploma.

== Career ==
Maughan's acting career began playing Ophelia in an Open University tour of Hamlet. In 1973, Maughan was chosen for the role of Rachel Rosing in a Granada Television serialisation of Howard Spring's novel, Shabby Tiger.

In 1973, she joined Alan Bennett at the Lyric Theatre in his original production of Habeas Corpus, playing Felicity Rumpers. She next worked with John Stride in the final series of Yorkshire Television's The Main Chance, playing the Nordic Inge Lindstrom.

In 1977, Maughan joined the cast of Franco Zeffirelli's Filumena, starring Joan Plowright and Colin Blakely in London's West End, where she met her future husband, actor Trevor Eve.

Maughan then went on to star in such series as The Enigma Files, The Flame Trees of Thika, Dombey and Son, and By the Sword Divided. In 1986, as a result of the success of The Flame Trees of Thika in America, Maughan was invited to do an episode of MacGyver. From 1987 to 1998, while running the internationally successful Gold Blend couple television advertisements for Nescafé, (Taster's Choice in the United States) alongside actor Anthony Head, she starred in episodes of Inspector Morse, Hannay, and Murder, She Wrote.

Onstage, she played Billie Dawn in Born Yesterday, and Nora in A Doll's House at Chichester Festival Theatre in 1993. She played Elizabeth Cady Stanton and Anna Howard Shaw in Paula Wagner's production of Out of Our Father's House at Hollywood's Fountainhead Theatre.

In 1993, she starred in Cinderella, alongside Kathleen Turner, the same year, worked with Richard Dreyfuss in Another Stakeout.

Upon finishing the Gold Blend television campaign in 1998, she went back to the theatre to do And All the Children Cried, playing Myra Hindley, which was immediately followed by Maughan joining the cast of the BBC One medical drama television series Holby City.

In 2008, she appeared in the Roger Donaldson directed The Bank Job, alongside Jason Statham. In 2009, she starred in the BBC's Waking the Dead, alongside her husband Trevor Eve as Superintendent Peter Boyd, and in 2012, Kidnap and Ransom, also starring Eve.

After premiering the new play Cradle Me, co-starring Luke Treadaway, Maughan went on to appear in the film She's Out of My League, in the role of Molly's mother, (Molly, the lead female character played by her real-life daughter Alice Eve), and also starred her husband, Trevor Eve, who played Molly's father.

In the 2011 series of Celebrity MasterChef, an ill-prepared Maughan was shocked and delighted to make it to the semi-final.

This was followed by a film made each year from 2012 to 2014: The Babymakers, directed by Jay Chandrasekhar; Flying Home directed by Dominique Derudiere, and Time Lapse, directed by Bradley King; and finally The Atticus Institute, directed by Chris Sparling – all shot in the USA.

In September 2014, Maughan starred in the British premiere of Neil LaBute's well received play Autobahn at the King's Head Theatre in Islington. She finished the play with a 30-minute monologue. She later appeared in the film Untitled playing the drug dealing mastermind controller of a struggling filmmaker.

In November 2015 she joined the programme Loose Women as a guest panellist.

== Personal life ==
In 1974 her boyfriend was footballer Phil Boersma.

In 1979, she met actor Trevor Eve, and they married in 1980. In 1982, Maughan gave birth to their first child, Alice, now an actor. They have two other children: Jack and George.

In 2010, Trevor, Sharon and Alice all appeared in She's Out of My League playing father, mother and daughter respectively.

In 2015, she participated in a charitable event for Barnardo's, in a campaign to recruit more foster carers.

== Filmography ==
Year	Title	Role	Notes
1973	Shabby Tiger	Rachel Rosing	
1979	Home Before Midnight	Helen Owen	
1980	The Enigma Files	Kate Burton	
1981	The Flame Trees of Thika	Lettice Palmer	
1983	Dombey and Son	Edith Granger	
1989	Inspector Morse	Kate Donn	"Deceived by Flight"
1991	The Ruth Rendell Mysteries	Imogen Ide	
1993	Another Stakeout	Barbara Burnside	
2008	The Bank Job	Sonia Bern	
2010	She's Out of My League	Mrs. McCleish	
2012	The Babymakers	Dr. Roberts	
2014	Death of a Farmer	Nora	
2014	Flying Home	Mother Colin	
2014	Time Lapse	Dr. Heidecker	
2015	The Atticus Institute	Susan Gorman	
2017	Untitled	Lucy	
2018	White Chamber	Sandra	
2018	The Con Is On	Guest One	
