= All the Day Long =

1959 novel by Howard Spring

- First edition (UK)
- Author: Howard Spring
- Language: English
- Genre: Drama
- Publisher: Collins (UK); Harper & Brothers (US)
- Publication date: 1959
- Media type: Print

All the Day Long is a 1959 novel by the British writer Howard Spring. As with many of his works, it is set in Cornwall and Manchester during the Victorian era.

== Bibliography ==
- George Watson & Ian R. Willison. The New Cambridge Bibliography of English Literature, Volume 4. CUP, 1972.
