= Edith Sharpe =

British actress (1894–1984)

- in Cash on Demand (1961)
- Born: Edith Mary Sharpe; 14 September 1894; Hackney, London, England
- Died: 6 June 1984 (aged 89); Harrow on the Hill, London, England
- Occupation: Actress
- Spouse: Alexander Francis Part

Edith Mary Sharpe (14 September 1894 – 6 June 1984) was a British actress. Born in Hackney, London. She married Alexander Francis Part in 1931 and had one child. She appeared in TV series such as Dixon of Dock Green, Z Cars, Emergency Ward 10, and Probation Officer (TV series). Her last known TV appearance was in War and Peace (1972 TV series). She died in Harrow on the Hill, London, aged 89.

== Selected filmography ==
- The Education of Elizabeth (1921) - Lucy Fairfax
- Music Hath Charms (1935) - Miss Wilkinson
- Broken Blossoms (1936) - Mrs. Reed
- The Tenth Man (1936) - Miss Hobbs
- Old Mother Riley (1937) - Matilda Lawson
- When the Bough Breaks (1947) - Matron
- The Guinea Pig (1948) - Mrs. Hartley
- That Dangerous Age (1949) - Angela Caine
- Landfall (1949) - Mrs. Chambers - Rick's Mother
- No Place for Jennifer (1950) - The Doctor
- Once a Sinner (1950) - Mrs. Ross
- Cloudburst (1951) - Mrs. Reece
- The Death of the Heart (1956) - Mrs. Heccomb
- My Guess Would be Murder - (1957) - Alice Hunter
- Brothers in Law (1957) - Mrs. Thursby
- Happy Is the Bride (1958) - Mildred Royd
- The Inn of the Sixth Happiness (1958) - Secretary at China Inland Mission
- A French Mistress (1960) - Matron
- Francis of Assisi (1961) - Donna Pica
- Cash on Demand (1961) - Miss Pringle
- Satan Never Sleeps (1962) - Sister Theresa
- Incident (1965) - Mrs. Blake - (short)
