= Shabby Tiger (TV series) =

British TV series

- Genre: Drama
- Based on: Shabby Tiger by Howard Spring
- Written by: Geoffrey Lancashire; Adele Rose
- Directed by: Baz Taylor; Richard Everitt
- Starring: John Nolan; Prunella Gee; Sharon Maughan
- Composer: Derek Hilton
- Country of origin: United Kingdom
- Original language: English
- No. of series: 1
- No. of episodes: 7

Production
- Producer: Richard Everitt
- Running time: 60 minutes
- Production company: Granada Television

Original release
- Network: ITV
- Release: 11 July – 22 August 1973

Shabby Tiger is a British period television drama series which aired in seven parts on ITV in 1973. It is an adaptation of the 1934 novel of the same title by Howard Spring.

== Selected cast ==
- John Nolan as Nick Faunt (7 episodes)
- Prunella Gee as Anna Fitzgerald (7 episodes)
- Sharon Maughan as Rachel Rosing (7 episodes)
- Howard Southern as Jacob 'Mo' Rosing (7 episodes)
- Alexander Edgar as Brian (7 episodes)
- John Sharp as Piggy White (5 episodes)
- Rowland Davies as Anton Brune (5 episodes)
- Patrick Holt as Sir George Faunt (4 episodes)
- Ray Mort as Joe Kepple (4 episodes)
- Christine Hargreaves as Olga Kepple (4 episodes)
- Sally Grace as Jenny Kepple (2 episodes)
- Peter Dudley as Harry (2 episodes)
- George Malpas as Mr. Carless (1 episode)
- Nigel Havers as Toby Scriven (1 episode)

== Bibliography ==
- Howard Maxford. Hammer Complete: The Films, the Personnel, the Company. McFarland, 2018.
