= Lady from Edinburgh =

1945 play

- Written by: Aimée Stuart and L. Arthur Rose.
- Original language: English
- Genre: Comedy
- Setting: Mayfair, present day

Premiere
- Date premiered: 26 February 1945
- Place premiered: His Majesty's Theatre, Aberdeen

Lady from Edinburgh is a 1945 comedy play by the British writers Aimée Stuart and L. Arthur Rose. A Scottish aunt arrives to oversee her family's affairs in Mayfair.

It premiered at His Majesty's Theatre in Aberdeen before transferring to the Playhouse Theatre in London's West End where it ran for 560 performances from 10 April 1945 to 10 August 1946. The original London cast included Dulcie Gray, Sophie Stewart, Ethel Coleridge, Henry Hewitt, Richard Bird and Alan Haines.

== Bibliography ==
- Wearing, J.P. The London Stage 1940-1949: A Calendar of Productions, Performers, and Personnel. Rowman & Littlefield, 2014.
