= There Is No Armour =

1948 novel by Howard Spring

- First edition
- Author: Howard Spring
- Language: English
- Genre: Drama
- Publisher: Collins
- Publication date: 1948
- Media type: Print

There Is No Armour is a 1948 novel by the British writer Howard Spring. It concerns the rise and career of a famous artist across several important decades in world history, positing that one cannot resist or disavow the actions of fate on one's life.

== Bibliography ==
- George Watson & Ian R. Willison. The New Cambridge Bibliography of English Literature, Volume 4. CUP, 1972.
