= William Bond (RFC officer) =

English Royal Flying Corps officer (1889–1917)

- Born: William Arthur Bond; 27 June 1889; Chesterfield, Derbyshire, England
- Died: 22 July 1917 (aged 28); Sallaumines, France
- Burial place: Arras Flying Services Memorial, Pas de Calais, France
- Military career
- Allegiance: United Kingdom
- Branch: King's Own Yorkshire Light Infantry; Royal Flying Corps
- Rank: Captain
- Unit: 40 Squadron RFC
- Awards: Military Cross with Bar

Captain William Arthur Bond MC & Bar (27 June 1889 – 22 July 1917) was a First World War flying ace credited with five aerial victories.

Bond was wounded while serving in the King's Own Yorkshire Light Infantry in the Dardanelles in 1916. After transferring to the Royal Flying Corps, Bond was posted to fly Nieuport fighters in No. 40 Squadron in early 1917. He flew Nieuport No. B1545 to five victories in a month, beginning on 10 May and ending on 9 June 1917.

He was appointed flight commander in July. On the 22nd, he was killed in action over Sallaumines while flying Nieuport No. B1688. Cause of his death is disputed; he is said to have either fallen to the guns of a two-seater observation plane from FA 235, or to anti-aircraft fire.

After his death, his wife Aimee (later Aimée Stuart) wrote An Airman's Wife about him.

== Honours and awards ==
- 24 June 1916 – Temp. 2nd Lt. William Arthur Bond, 1st Bn (attd 7th Bn.) Yorks. L.I. is awarded the Military Cross For conspicuous gallantry when on patrol. An enemy patrol was met and bombs were exchanged, one of which wounded both 2nd Lt. Bond and another officer, The enemy retired and opened machine-gun fire, which again wounded the other officer. 2nd Lt. Bond and Private Garnett at great risk brought him in over 200 yards under heavy machine-gun fire.
- 16 August 1917 – T./Lt. William Arthur Bond, MC, Yorks LI and RFC is awarded a bar to the Military Cross For conspicuous gallantry and devotion to duty. While on patrol he attacked at close range a hostile machine, which was sent down out of control. Shortly afterwards he attacked another, which stalled and fell sideways. On another date he flew over the lines at about 50 feet and attacked a hostile balloon, bringing it down in flames.
