= Alan Dent =

Scottish journalist, editor and writer

Alan Dent wearing a tartan tie.

Alan Holmes Dent (7 January 1905 – 19 December 1978) was a Scottish journalist, editor, and writer.

== Early life ==
Alan Dent was born in Maybole, Ayrshire, Scotland, of English parents. He lost his mother when he was two years old. He was educated at Carrick Academy and Glasgow University, where he studied medicine at the age of 16, but later switched to French, English, and Italian. He left the university without a degree in 1926, heading for London.

== Career ==
Dent approached the critic James Agate in the hope of becoming his secretary and was appointed. He remained with Agate for 14 years. Later, in Agate's Ego volumes of diaries and letters, Dent was, according to John Gielgud, called "Jock".

During the Second World War, Dent served in the Royal Navy. Later, he was the London drama critic of the Manchester Guardian and the News Chronicle. He became the film critic of the Illustrated London News and broadcast for the BBC's European Service. He edited the letters of Mrs. Patrick Campbell and Bernard Shaw. He was the text editor and advisor to Laurence Olivier for his three Shakespeare films as star and director: Henry V (1944), Hamlet (1948), and Richard III (1955).

== Death ==
Dent died at his home in Beaconsfield, Buckinghamshire, on 19 December 1978, aged 73.

== Selected publications ==
- Nocturnes and rhapsodies. Hamish Hamilton, London, 1950.
- Bernard Shaw and Mrs. Patrick Campbell: Their correspondence. Victor Gollancz, London, 1952. (editor)
- My dear America. Arthur Barker, London, 1954.
- Mrs. Patrick Campbell. Museum Press, London, 1961.
- How well do you know your Shakespeare? Forty sets of questions and answers. Macdonald, London. 1964.
- Burns in his time. Nelson, London, 1966.
- Vivien Leigh: A bouquet. Hamish Hamilton, London, 1969. ISBN 0241018064
- My Covent Garden. J.M. Dent, London, 1973. ISBN 0460041126
- World of Shakespeare series - multiple volumes
