= When the Bough Breaks (1947 film) =

- Theatrical release poster
- Directed by: Lawrence Huntington
- Screenplay by: Peter Rogers uncredited: Muriel Box; Sydney Box
- Based on: an original story by Moie Charles; Herbert Victor
- Produced by: Betty E. Box
- Starring: Patricia Roc; Rosamund John; Bill Owen
- Cinematography: Bryan Langley
- Edited by: Gordon Hales
- Music by: Clifton Parker
- Production company: Gainsborough Pictures
- Distributed by: General Film Distributors
- Release date: 19 November 1947
- Running time: 78 minutes
- Country: United Kingdom
- Language: English
- Budget: less than £125,000
- Box office: £125,000 (by July 1953)

When the Bough Breaks is a 1947 film directed by Lawrence Huntington and starring Patricia Roc and Rosamund John. It was written by Peter Rogers, Muriel Box and Sydney Box, based on an original story by Moie Charles and Herbert Victor. The film is a study of adoption and the competing ties of one child's birth and foster family.

== Plot ==
After learning that her husband is a bigamist who already had a wife, new mother Lily Gardner resolves to raise her baby, Jimmy, on her own under her maiden name of Lily Bates rather than give him up for adoption. Each day Lily leaves Jimmy at a day nursery while she works as a shopgirl at a department store, and then cares for Jimmy herself at night. Frances Norman, a middle-class married woman who works at the day nursery to be around children after losing her own baby, is drawn to Jimmy. When Lily, under stress from her demanding schedule, becomes ill with flu, Frances persuades Lily to let her and her husband look after Jimmy temporarily. When Lily recovers, she visits Jimmy at the Normans' comfortable home. Seeing that Jimmy is happy and is receiving better food and care than she was able to manage, Lily agrees to let the Normans raise Jimmy, although she refuses to sign any legal document formally allowing them to adopt Jimmy. Lily eventually gives up on staying in touch with the Normans and drops out of Jimmy's life, although she misses him. The Normans do not tell Jimmy he is adopted and he regards them as his parents.

Eight years pass, during which time Lily rises to the level of manager at the department store and falls in love with a kind shopkeeper, Bill Collins, who marries her and is willing to accept Jimmy as his own. Lily visits the Normans to reclaim Jimmy, now that she has the resources to take care of him, but the Normans refuse to give him up since Lily has not been part of Jimmy's life and he does not know he is not the Normans' natural child. A legal battle ensues, and the court awards custody of Jimmy to Lily due to the lack of any formal adoption agreement. Jimmy goes to live with Lily and Bill, but has trouble adjusting to life in a working-class household, and runs away in an attempt to return to the Normans, whom he considers his true "mummy and daddy". Bill, seeing that Jimmy is unhappy, persuades Lily to let him return to the Normans. Lily and Bill then have a baby of their own and are shown happily celebrating his birthday, while Jimmy celebrates his birthday with the Normans.

== Cast ==
- Patricia Roc as Lily Bates
- Rosamund John as Frances Norman
- Bill Owen as Bill Collins
- Brenda Bruce as Ruby Chapman
- Patrick Holt as Robert Norman
- Cavan Malone as Jimmy
- Leslie Dwyer as George
- Sonia Holm as Nurse
- Torin Thatcher as Adams
- Catherine Lacey as almoner
- Edith Sharpe as Matron
- Noel Howlett as Judge

== Production ==
The film was the second in four films produced by Betty Box for Gainsborough with a total budget of £600,000. It was less glamorous than the typical Gainsborough melodrama, with no outfit worn by Patricia Roc costing more than £5. Roc played a working class role. The house featured in the film was based on the real life house of Sydney Box.

== Reception ==
=== Box office ===
The film received some negative reviews, but was popular and made a profit. Trade papers called the film a "notable box office attraction" in British cinemas in 1948.

=== Critical ===
The Monthly Film Bulletin wrote: "Since this film is probably meant to be popular entertainment rather than a tract on the dangers of haphazard adoption, it is strange that so unromantic a person as Bill Owen was chosen for Patricia Roc's male lead. He makes the shopkeeper a nice little fellow, but one fears that Patricia's fans will feel cheated of their ration of heart-throbs."

Kine Weekly wrote: "Mother-love melodrama built on novelettish lines. ... It's a long time getting to its point and when it does it merely stresses the obvious. The acting and dialogue are no more distinguished than the script. Emotionally cheap, its appeal is limited to the industrial element."

The Daily Film Renter wrote: "As indicated by the title, this cradle song is largely concerned with the nursery. ... Similar in treatment to Holiday Camp, this is another meet-the-people picture, a tear jerker this time, but it has the qualities of sincerity and everyday realism that made Holiday Camp so popular."
