= Cash on Demand =

1961 British film by Quentin Lawrence

- Original theatrical poster
- Directed by: Quentin Lawrence
- Screenplay by: David T. Chantler; Lewis Greifer
- Based on: (A play) The Gold Inside by Jacques Gillies
- Produced by: Michael Carreras; Anthony Nelson-Keys
- Starring: Peter Cushing; André Morell; Richard Vernon; Norman Bird
- Cinematography: Arthur Grant
- Edited by: Eric Boyd-Perkins
- Music by: Wilfred Josephs; John Hollingsworth
- Production companies: Hammer Film Productions; Woodpecker Productions
- Distributed by: Columbia Pictures (US); British Lion (UK)
- Release dates: 20 December 1961 (US); 13 December 1963 (United Kingdom)
- Running time: 84 minutes (USA); 66 minutes (UK)
- Country: United Kingdom
- Language: English
- Budget: £37,000

Cash on Demand is a 1961 British black and white second feature neo noir crime thriller film, released by Hammer Film Productions, directed by Quentin Lawrence and starring Peter Cushing and André Morell.

== Plot ==
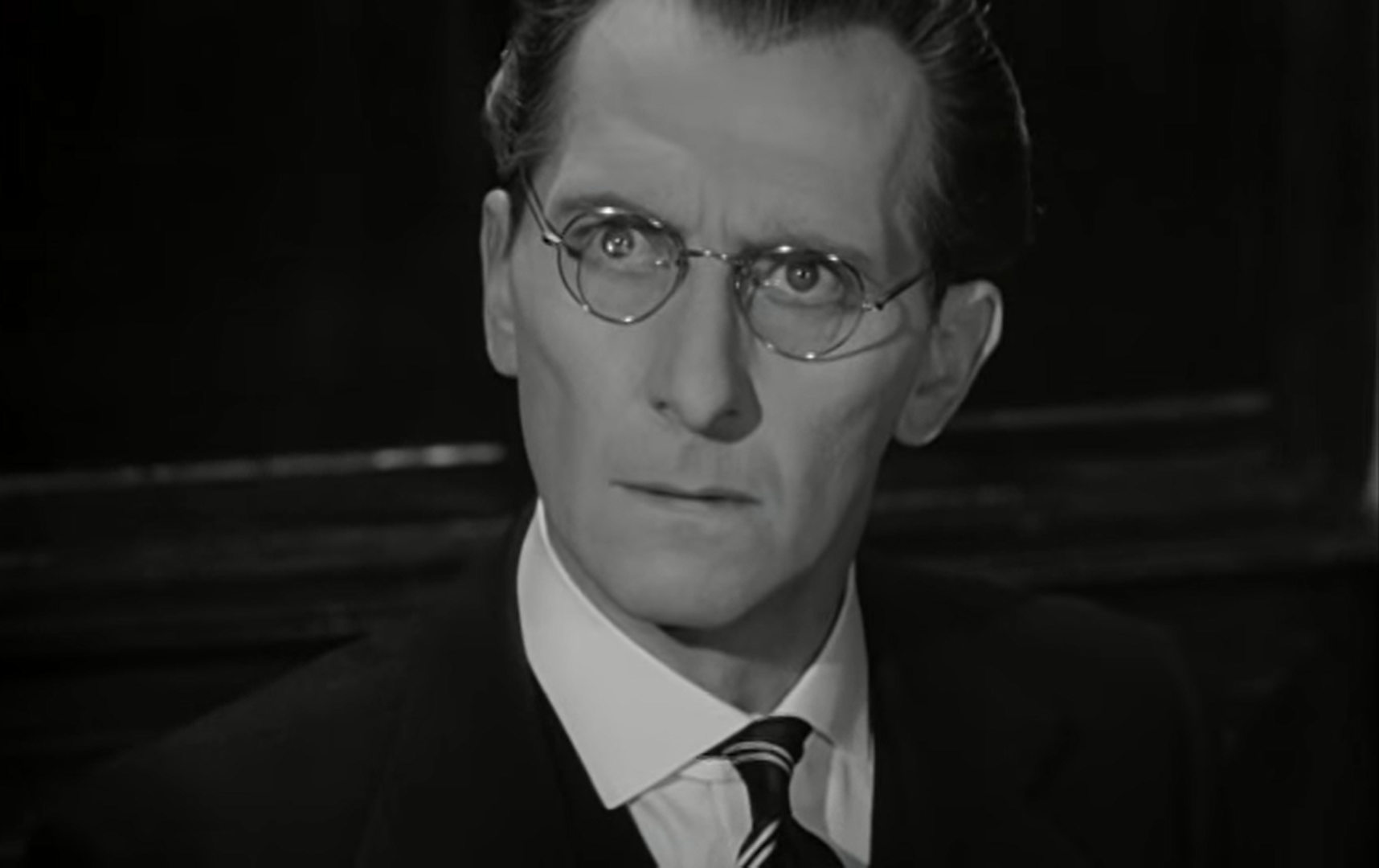
Peter Cushing as Harry Fordyce

Two days before Christmas, a bogus insurance auditor, "Colonel Gore Hepburn", appears at a provincial bank.

Bank manager Harry Fordyce is a cold, officious man who treats his employees with disdain, but is revealed to care a great deal about his family. "Colonel Hepburn" recognises the insecurities underlying Fordyce's behaviour and exploits them ruthlessly, tormenting him with veiled threats.

Feeling that he has no choice, and showing increasingly distraught agitation about his kidnapped wife and son, Fordyce helps Hepburn to steal £93,000 in banknotes from the bank vault, concealing his actions from the rest of the staff. However, the staff have already phoned the bank's insurance company as a routine precaution, and discovered that Hepburn is an impostor.

When Fordyce learns the police are on their way, he becomes desperate for his family's safety. Fordyce convinces assistant manager Pearson to cover for him by excusing the “false” alarm as a legitimate cheque draft of which he was unaware.

Police arrest Col. Hepburn with suitcases containing the bank's money and bring him back to the bank. "Gore Hepburn" is not his real name; he is a known criminal. Police suspect he must have had inside help, which points to Fordyce, who is shocked to see him again, as he has been led to believe if Hepburn could not make a clean getaway, his family would be killed.

A phone call establishes that Fordyce's family were never under threat. Fordyce tries to convince the police that the Colonel deceived him, for instance, by ordering him at one point to stand by the window and mop his brow, as a signal to a supposed associate outside. As he demonstrates this to the officers, a sealed bank package of £500 (which Hepburn had slipped into his pocket earlier) falls out. Once more the police are sceptical of his innocence. Hepburn tells the police that he and another man used a tape recorder to capture the voices of Fordyce’s wife and son to convince him they had been kidnapped, and that Fordyce is telling the truth.

The police dismiss Fordyce as a suspect, but request he accompany them to the station. Knowing his wife and son are safe, he is grateful to his co-workers for helping him. He tells Pearson he is confident that Pearson can manage the bank in his absence (the opposite of his opinion earlier in the day), assuring him he will be back in a few hours to join them at the staff Christmas party, a ritual he previously never attended.

== Cast ==
- Peter Cushing as Harry Fordyce
- André Morell as Colonel Gore Hepburn (as Andre Morell)
- Richard Vernon as Pearson
- Norman Bird as Arthur Sanderson
- Kevin Stoney as Detective Inspector Bill Mason
- Barry Lowe as Peter Harvill
- Edith Sharpe as Miss Pringle
- Lois Daine as Sally
- Alan Haywood as Kane
- Charles Morgan as Det. Sgt. Collins
- Fred Stone
- Gareth Tandy
- Vera Cook

== Production ==
The screenplay was adapted from the Associated Television Theatre 70 episode "The Gold Inside" (broadcast 24 September 1960), also directed by Lawrence, and featuring André Morell and Richard Vernon in the same roles. Filming ran from 4 April to 16 April 1961 and, although Hammer considered it one of their best films, it was not distributed in the UK until 1963. The British print was 18 minutes shorter than the US print.

Hammer Film Productions invested approximately £37,000 to produce the film. To optimise its budget the film uses a limited number of sets: an interior street set, the trading area of a bank, the manager's office, the stairway between office and the vault, and the interior of the vault itself.

== Release ==
Columbia Pictures released the film in the United States on 20 December 1961, and screenings continued until April in some major cities. The film's UK release was delayed until 13 December 1963.

== Critical reception ==
The Monthly Film Bulletin wrote: "Set from first to last in a small country bank, this is a neat and quite freshly conceived robbery thriller. There is no violence (only the threat of violence), yet the menace is more pronounced than in many films relying on physical brutality. Once the preliminaries are over and the story begins to unfold, the tenseness of the situation is maintained with considerable success right through to the concluding stages. The only weak point is the business of the wife's telephone call, which is finally revealed as false: much of the plot's conviction rests on this circumstance, which is inadequately explained by a vague reference to an impersonation and a trick with a tape recorder. Otherwise the story is watertight, terse and gripping. Andre Morell's performance as the thief is a little too deliberately phony, perhaps, but Peter Cushing is impressive as the prim bank manager, and there is a nice cameo from Richard Vernon as the cashier."

Cash on Demand was selected by the film historians Steve Chibnall and Brian McFarlane as one of the 15 most meritorious British B films made between the Second World War and 1970, writing: "Above all, it is Peter Cushing's performance of the austere man, to whom efficiency matters most (though the film is subtle enough to allow him a certain integrity as well), and who will be frightened into a warmer sense of humanity, that lifts the film well above the perfunctory levels of much 'B' film-making."

In Offbeat: British Cinema's Curiosities, Obscurities and Forgotten Items, Julian Upton wrote: "Cash on Demand is not just vastly superior to the majority of its British B-movie peers, it is also a cut above most of Hammer's output, both horror and non-horror."

== See also ==
- List of Christmas films
