= My Son, My Son! =

1940 film

- Film poster
- Directed by: Charles Vidor
- Written by: Lenore J. Coffee
- Based on: My Son, My Son; 1938 novel by Howard Spring
- Produced by: Edward Small
- Starring: Madeleine Carroll; Brian Aherne; Louis Hayward
- Cinematography: Harry Stradling
- Edited by: Fred R. Feitshans Jr. Grant Whytock
- Music by: Edward Ward
- Production company: Edward Small Productions
- Distributed by: United Artists
- Release date: March 22, 1940
- Running time: 116 minutes
- Country: United States
- Language: English

My Son, My Son! is a 1940 American drama film directed by Charles Vidor and based on a novel by the same name written by Howard Spring. It was nominated for an Academy Award for Best Art Direction by John DuCasse Schulze.

== Cast ==
- Madeleine Carroll as Livia Vaynol
- Brian Aherne as William Essex
- Louis Hayward as Oliver Essex
- Laraine Day as Maeve O'Riorden
- Henry Hull as Dermot O'Riorden
- Josephine Hutchinson as Nellie Moscrop Essex
- Sophie Stewart as Sheila O'Riorden
- Bruce Lester as Rory O'Riorden
- Scotty Beckett as Oliver as a Child
- Brenda Henderson as Maeve as a Child
- Teddy Moorwood as Rory as a Child
- May Beatty as Annie
- Stanley Logan as The Colonel
- Lionel Belmore as Mr. Moscrop
- Mary Gordon as Mrs. Mulvaney
- David Clyde as Drayman
- Vesey O'Davoren as Parker, Butler
- Pat Flaherty as Joe Baxter
- Victor Kendall as Pogson
- Mary Field as Betsy, First Maid
- Audrey Manners as Second Maid
- Sibyl Harris as First Landlady
- Connie Leon as Second Landlady

== Production ==
Edward Small bought the film rights to the book for $50,000 and believed that the story could provide an ideal vehicle for his new star Louis Hayward. Lenore Coffee, who wrote the script, said that Small "was a rather ignorant man, but he had inklings and hunches ... I liked him very much. He had a hunch about My Son, My Son! and he bought it. He had never bought an elegant story before."

Production of the film was temporarily halted with the outbreak of World War II.
