= Sophie Stewart =

Scottish actress (1908–1977)

- Born: Sophia Lyal Drummond Stewart; 5 March 1908; Crieff, Perthshire, Scotland
- Died: 6 June 1977 (aged 69); Cupar, Fife, Scotland
- Occupation: Actress
- Spouse: Ellis Irving (m. 1939–1977)

Sophie Stewart (5 March 1908 – 6 June 1977) was a British actress of stage and screen.

== Biography ==
She was born as Sophia Lyal Drummond Stewart in Crieff, Perthshire, Scotland, in March 1908 and died in June 1977 at the age of 69, in Cupar, Fife, Scotland.

In 1936 she played Marigold on the BBC production "Scenes from Marigold".

In 1937 she starred in Return of the Scarlet Pimpernel as Lady Blakeney. Her West End stage appearances included James Bridie's A Sleeping Clergyman (1933), Aimée Stuart's Lady from Edinburgh (1945), J. Lee Thompson's The Human Touch (1948) and Michael Clayton Hutton's Dead Secret (1952).

She was married to the actor Ellis Irving.

== Filmography ==
Year	Title	Role	Notes
1935	City of Beautiful Nonsense	Jill Dealtry	
1935	Her Last Affaire	Jodie Weyre	
1935	Maria Marten, or The Murder in the Red Barn	Maria Marten	
1936	Things to Come	Mrs. Cabal	
1936	The Man Who Could Work Miracles	Maggie Hooper	
1936	As You Like It	Celia	
1937	Under the Red Robe	Elise, Duchess of Fiox	
1937	The Return of the Scarlet Pimpernel	Marguerite, his wife	
1938	Who Goes Next?	Sarah	
1938	Marigold	Marigold Sellar	
1939	Nurse Edith Cavell	Sister Watkins	
1940	My Son, My Son!	Sheila O'Riorden	
1943	The Lamp Still Burns	Christine Morris	
1944	Strawberry Roan	Mrs. Morley	
1947	Uncle Silas	Lady Monica Waring	
1952	Made in Heaven	Marjorie Topham	
1954	Devil Girl from Mars	Mrs. Jamieson	
1957	Yangtse Incident: The Story of H.M.S. Amethyst	Miss Charlotte Dunlap	
1957	No Time for Tears	Sister Willis	
