= Hard Facts =

1944 novel by British writer Howard Spring

- First US edition
- Author: Howard Spring
- Cover artist: Fritz Kredel
- Language: English
- Genre: Drama
- Publisher: Collins (UK); Viking Press (US)
- Publication date: 1944
- Media type: Print

Hard Facts is a 1944 novel by the British writer Howard Spring. A young curate is sent to work in Manchester, where he encounters the Dunkerley family who own a struggling printing firm. It was followed by a sequel Dunkerley's in 1946.

== Bibliography ==
- Merriam-Webster's Encyclopedia of Literature. Merriam-Webster, 1995.
