= Fame Is the Spur (TV series) =

- Genre: Drama
- Based on: Fame Is the Spur by Howard Spring
- Directed by: David Giles
- Starring: Tim Pigott-Smith; Julia Sawalha; Joanna David
- Composer: Alan Price
- Country of origin: United Kingdom

Production
- Producer: Richard Beynon
- Editor: John Barclay

Original release
- Network: BBC1
- Release: 8 January – 26 February 1982

Fame Is the Spur is a British television mini-series consisting of 8 episodes which first aired on the BBC in 1982. It was based on the 1940 novel Fame Is the Spur by Howard Spring. It depicts a socialist politician who betrays his early beliefs as he grows older, and was believed to be based upon the Labour Prime Minister Ramsay MacDonald. It had previously been adapted as a film Fame Is the Spur by the Boulting Brothers in 1947.

The series starred Tim Pigott-Smith as Hamer Shawcross, prior to his success in The Jewel in the Crown. Joanna David played Shawcross's wife and George Costigan co-starred as Tom Hannaway.

== Premise ==
The story chronicles the careers of three working-class boys (Hamer, Arnold and Tom) from Manchester and their descendants spanning the momentous years from 1877 to the onset of the Second World War.

Hamer, whose youthful socialist zeal is soon converted to personal ambition, exploiting the Labour Party movement to become a Member of Parliament, marrying well and eventually entering the House of Lords.

Arnold is the sensitive and courageous pioneer of Trade Union growth.

Tome is the perky opportunist who progresses from rag-and-bone man to tycoon and a knighthood following his own self-help philosophy.

Their fortunes are intertwined in a vivid, often melodramatic tapestry of events involving friendships and betrayals, births, marriages and deaths. The female characters are particularly strong, among them Hamer's wife Anne, with a burning social conscience; Ellen as his implacable mother; Pen Muff, the courageous political activist and wife of Arnold, and Polly, Tom's socially ambitious wife.
