= The Houses in Between =

1951 novel by Howard Spring

- First edition (UK)
- Author: Howard Spring
- Language: English
- Genre: Drama
- Publisher: Collins (UK); Harper & Brothers (US)
- Publication date: 1951
- Media type: Print

The Houses in Between is a 1951 novel by the British writer Howard Spring. It follows the life of one character Sarah Rainborough from 1851 to 1948. At the beginning of the story she is taken by her family to see The Crystal Palace in London as part of the Great Exhibition.

The title refers to a traditional music hall song that you would be able to see to Crystal Palace if it weren't for the houses in between. Much of the novel is set in Cornwall, where Spring lived and used as the setting for many of his later works. In America it reached the Publishers Weekly annual list of bestselling novels for 1953.

== Bibliography ==
- Merriam-Webster's Encyclopedia of Literature. Merriam-Webster, 1995.
