= No Place for Jennifer =

1950 film

- Directed by: Henry Cass
- Written by: J. Lee Thompson
- Based on: No Difference to Me by Phyllis Hambledon
- Produced by: Hamilton G. Inglis
- Starring: Leo Genn; Rosamund John; Guy Middleton; Janette Scott
- Cinematography: William McLeod
- Edited by: Monica Kimick
- Music by: Allan Gray
- Production company: ABPC
- Distributed by: Associated British-Pathé (UK)
- Release date: 20 February 1950
- Running time: 89 minutes
- Country: United Kingdom
- Language: English
- Box office: £151,352 (UK)

No Place for Jennifer is a 1950 British film directed by Henry Cass and starring Leo Genn, Rosamund John, Guy Middleton and Janette Scott. It was written by J. Lee Thompson based on the 1948 novel No Difference to Me by Phyllis Hambleton.

== Plot ==
Jennifer, a young girl, suffers when her parents divorce and marry new partners. In desperation, she runs away, and finds a home with another loving family.

== Cast ==
- Leo Genn as William
- Rosamund John as Rachel Kershaw
- Beatrice Campbell as Paula
- Guy Middleton as Brian Stewart
- Janette Scott as Jennifer
- Anthony Nicholls as Baxter
- Jean Cadell as Aunt Jacqueline
- Megs Jenkins as Mrs Marshall
- Philip Ray as Mr Marshall
- Edith Sharpe as doctor
- Ann Codrington as Miss Hancock
- Brian Smith as Martin Marshall
- André Morell as counsel
- Anthony Wager as Ted
- William Simons as Jeremy

== Critical reception ==
The Monthly Film Bulletin wrote: "The story, which might be described as the poor man's What Maisie Knew, suffers from stilted dialogue, uninspired direction and an overdose of applied psychology. The acting of Janette Scott, however, though perhaps a little precocious at the beginning, is quite remarkable, and will probably earn for the film as a whole, a success it does not really deserve."

Kine Weekly wrote: "Janette Scott, a clever youngster, acts with easy assurance and wins considerable sympathy in the name part, but good as her performance is, it fails to atone ior an overloaded and cliché-ridden script."

Variety wrote: "Latest Associated British production introduces a new child star, Janette Scott, who has the makings of an important boxoffice attraction. For her initial subject she has been put in an over-sentimentalized role which gives her little scope for acting but proves that she is a warm, genuine personality. ... There is no thought of playing down the emotional side of this story and every situation is treated with a heavy sugary hand. ... Leo Genn, as the unhappy father who tries to do his best for the child, plays the part with genuine sincerity, and Rosamund John as the unenviable second wife, is full of understanding for the difficulties of the situation. Beatrice Campbell is a shade too cold as the child's mother and Guy Middleton has little more than a bit as her second husband."

Bosley Crowther wrote in The New York Times, "a tepid but touching little drama ... Henry Cass has directed it primly, in a warm tea-and-crumpets style, and the little girl plays it devoutly."
