= A Sunset Touch =

1953 novel by Howard Spring

- First edition (UK)
- Author: Howard Spring
- Language: English
- Genre: Drama
- Publisher: Collins (UK); Harper & Brothers (US)
- Publication date: 1953
- Media type: Print

A Sunset Touch is a 1953 novel by the British writer Howard Spring.

A bank clerk, Roger Menheniot, yearns, during World War Two, to escape from London by acquiring, if possible, a house in Cornwall, the site of which was formerly owned by some of his ancestors. This aspiration takes him into involvement with various local people in the area, with various consequences.

== Bibliography ==
- George Watson & Ian R. Willison. The New Cambridge Bibliography of English Literature, Volume 4. CUP, 1972.
