= I Met a Lady =

1961 novel by Howard Spring

- First edition
- Author: Howard Spring
- Language: English
- Genre: Drama
- Publisher: Collins
- Publication date: 1961
- Media type: Print

I Met a Lady is a 1961 novel by the British writer Howard Spring. During the First World War a boy is sent from Manchester to stay in Cornwall due to improve his health. There he meets an unusual group of characters who influence him strongly and intertwine with his life over the coming decades.

== Bibliography ==
- George Watson & Ian R. Willison. The New Cambridge Bibliography of English Literature, Volume 4. CUP, 1972.
