= Rachel Rosing =

1935 novel by Howard Spring

- First edition
- Author: Howard Spring
- Language: English
- Genre: Drama
- Publisher: William Collins, Sons
- Publication date: 1935
- Media type: Print

Rachel Rosing is a 1935 novel by the British writer Howard Spring. It is the sequel to Shabby Tiger, published the previous year (1934).

== Bibliography ==
- George Watson & Ian R. Willison. The New Cambridge Bibliography of English Literature, Volume 4. Cambridge University Press, 1972.
