= Robert Krasker =

Australian cinematographer (1913–1981)

- Born: 21 August 1913; Alexandria, Egypt
- Died: 16 August 1981 (aged 67); London, England
- Occupation: Cinematographer

Robert Krasker, BSC (21 August 1913 – 16 August 1981) was an Australian cinematographer who worked on more than 60 films in his career, mainly in the United Kingdom. He was the first Australian-born cinematographer to win an Academy Award, in 1951 for his work on Carol Reed's The Third Man (1949). He was also nominated for a BAFTA Award for the film The Running Man (1963), also directed by Reed.

== Life and career ==
Robert Krasker was born in Alexandria, Egypt during a family business trip to Europe and back, and his birth was registered in Perth, Western Australia. He moved to England in 1931 after studying art in Paris and photography in Dresden, and after joining Les Studios Paramount in Joinville-le-Pont where he worked as translator and camera assistant to Philip Tannura, found work at Alexander Korda's London Films, where he became a senior camera operator. His first credit as Director of Photography was The Saint Meets the Tiger (cinematography in 1941, released in 1943), directed by Paul L. Stein followed by The Gentle Sex (cinematography in 1942, released in 1943), directed by Leslie Howard and The Lamp Still Burns (cinematography in 1943, released in 1943), directed by Maurice Elvey.

Robert Krasker's neo-expressionist camerawork on Odd Man Out (1947) and The Third Man (1949), both directed by Carol Reed may have been influenced by film noir and Expressionism to some degree but his approach to cinematography was largely realist and not expressionist, influenced more by the Bauhaus and New Objectivity than German Expressionism.

Krasker received an Academy Award for his work on The Third Man. He also worked on Henry V (1944) for Laurence Olivier, Brief Encounter (1945) for David Lean and Another Man's Poison (1951) for Irving Rapper.

Lean sacked him from Great Expectations in 1945 because both he and producer Ronald Neame were reportedly unhappy with his handling of the marsh scenes though accounts differ. However he is credited with the often highly-praised opening scene of that film. Krasker's later films included the epics Alexander the Great (1956), directed by Robert Rossen, El Cid (1961), directed by Anthony Mann and The Fall of the Roman Empire (1964), again directed by Mann.

Krasker returned to Australia in 1951 for a vacation during a lull in his career after winning his Academy Award and to try setting up an international film production studio in Sydney, and several times afterwards wrote about movies he shot.

Robert Krasker's legacy during and after his lifetime is relatively unknown in Australia, and 200 photographs from his personal collection were sold after his death in London to the British Film Institute (BFI). His death in 1981 was noted by an Australian film director at the time, Bruce Beresford.

Krasker was the first Australian cinematographer to win an Oscar; the second was Dean Semler who won in 1990 for Dances with Wolves.
