= Winds of the Day =

Novel by Howard Spring

- First edition
- Author: Howard Spring
- Language: English
- Genre: Drama
- Publisher: Collins
- Publication date: 1964
- Media type: Print

Winds of the Day is a 1964 novel by the British writer Howard Spring. It was Spring's final novel.

== Bibliography ==
- George Watson & Ian R. Willison. The New Cambridge Bibliography of English Literature, Volume 4. CUP, 1972.
