= Fame Is the Spur (novel) =

Novel by Howard Spring

First US edition (publ. Viking Press)

Fame Is the Spur is a novel by Howard Spring published in 1940. It covers the rise of the socialist labour movement in Britain from the mid-19th century to the 1930s. The title comes from John Milton's poem "Lycidas": "Fame is the spur that the clear spirit doth raise / (That last infirmity of noble mind) / To scorn delights, and live laborious days".

== Plot summary ==
The central character, Hamer Shawcross, starts as a studious boy in an aspirational working-class family in Ancoats, Manchester; he becomes a socialist activist and soon a career politician, who eventually is absorbed by the upper classes he had begun by combating.

In fact the story is rather subtler than this summary sounds, despite the fact that the author's sympathies obviously lie with Shawcross's friends and associates who remain faithful to the cause; however, many of the middle class and aristocratic characters are portrayed fairly sympathetically, and one character whose career parallels that of Shawcross in his rise from poverty to eminence is a market-boy who becomes a major capitalist. The book also gives a fair impression of the growth particularly of the Labour Party in Britain; historical characters, such as Keir Hardie, occasionally appear, and part of the book is taken up with the hardships of life for coal mining communities in South Wales at the turn of the 20th century. The treatment of the militant women's suffrage movement is especially detailed—there are graphic descriptions of imprisonment and forcible feeding of hunger strikers.

Hamer Shawcross is often taken to be based on Ramsay MacDonald; though there are similarities in their careers, there are as many differences in their personalities.

== Adaptations ==
A 1947 film, Fame Is the Spur, starring Michael Redgrave and scripted by Nigel Balchin ignores the subtleties to give a straightforward tale of a revolutionary's drift into self-satisfied conservatism as the years go on. The name of the central character was changed to Hamer Radshaw in the film because Hartley Shawcross was at this date a prominent member of the Labour government.

A 1982 TV series starring Tim Pigott-Smith as Hamer Shawcross more accurately portrayed the subtleties of the book. The book was also dramatised as an eight-part BBC radio series starring Ian McKellen, first broadcast in 1979 and most recently on BBC Radio 4 Extra in June 2020.
