= Ellis Irving =

Australian actor (1902–1983)

- Born: Edward William Ellis Irving; 2 January 1902; Sydney, New South Wales, Australia
- Died: 27 March 1983 (aged 81); Cupar, Perthshire, Scotland, UK
- Occupation: Actor
- Spouse: Sophie Stewart

Edward William Ellis Irving (2 January 1902 – 27 March 1983) was an Australian film actor who appeared in a number of British films. He was married to the British stage and screen actress Sophie Stewart.

He was born Sydney, Australia in January 1902 and died in March 1983 in Cupar, Scotland. he appeared in productions from 1932 and 1968.

== Filmography ==
Year	Title	Role	Notes
1933	The Bermondsey Kid	Joe Dougherty	
1934	Nine Forty-Five	Turner	
1934	Open All Night		
1935	Murder at Monte Carlo	Marc Orton	
1935	The Black Mask	Verrell	
1936	As You Like It	Second Lord	Uncredited
1937	Member of the Jury	Walter Maitland	
1940	The Earl of Chicago	Russell	Uncredited
1940	The Invisible Man Returns	Miner at Radcliffe Colliery	Uncredited
1940	The House of the Seven Gables	Man Drinking From Cup	Uncredited
1940	Florian	Swiss Officer	Uncredited
1940	The Sea Hawk	Monty Preston	
1940	Arise, My Love	RAF Corporal	Uncredited
1942	Captains of the Clouds	Commanding Officer	Uncredited
1942	Went the Day Well?	Harry Drew	
1943	Variety Jubilee	Kit Burns	
1944	Strawberry Roan	Auctioneer	
1945	Murder in Reverse	Detective Sgt. Howell	
1946	I'll Turn to You	Henry Browning	
1947	The Root of All Evil	Auctioneer	
1947	Green Fingers	Jones	
1951	Pool of London	Superintendent	Uncredited
1953	Rough Shoot	Wharton	
1959	Strictly Confidential	Captain Sharples	
