= The Lamp Still Burns =

- Ernest Thesiger as the Chairman
- Directed by: Maurice Elvey
- Written by: Elizabeth Baron; Charles Nelson (add. dialogue); Roland Pertwee (add. dialogue)
- Based on: One Pair of Feet by Monica Dickens
- Produced by: Leslie Howard
- Starring: Rosamund John; Stewart Granger; Godfrey Tearle
- Cinematography: Robert Krasker
- Edited by: Frederick Wilson
- Music by: John Greenwood
- Production company: Two Cities Films
- Distributed by: General Film Distributors (UK)
- Release date: 29 November 1943
- Running time: 87–92 minutes
- Country: United Kingdom
- Language: English

The Lamp Still Burns is a 1943 British drama film directed by Maurice Elvey and starring Rosamund John, Stewart Granger and Godfrey Tearle. Its plot concerns a woman architect who changes careers to become a nurse.

It was based on the 1942 novel One Pair of Feet by Monica Dickens. Like the novel, the film is a plea for better conditions in English hospitals – and, more specifically, for better treatment of England's selfless nurses.

The Lamp Still Burns was produced by actor Leslie Howard, who was killed in the service of his country not long after the film was released.

== Plot ==
Laurence Rains is annoyed when architect Hilary Clarke insists he must enlarge the first aid room in his factory to satisfy government regulations, even though it has the best safety record in the country. He encounters her once again, now a nurse trainee assisting a doctor treating one of his employees.

He finds out that Clarke only became an architect to please her father, who had no sons to follow in his profession. When she saw how her young assistant at her firm, seriously injured in a traffic accident, was tended to by the nurses, she found her true vocation. Pamela Siddell, a violinist and Rains' fiancée, sees his attraction to Clarke.

Through the influence of Sir Marshall Freyne, one of her clients and a member of the board of Queen Eleanor's Hospital, Clarke is allowed to embark on a tough nurse training course, though she is somewhat older than the typical nineteen- or twenty-year-old candidate. Her independence gets her into trouble time and time again with the strict, by-the-book matron in charge of the nurses when she questions some of the numerous regulations (for example, nurses are not allowed to speak directly to the doctors).

Romantic complications arise when both Rains and Siddell become patients at the hospital after a factory explosion. Rains and Clarke fall in love. Siddell eventually releases her fiancé from their engagement. However, nurses are expected to devote themselves body and soul to their profession and do not have time for personal relationships. Clarke's friend and fellow nurse Christine Morris decides in favour of love, and gives up her career and a promotion to "sister" to marry the man she loves. Clarke chooses differently, but Rains vows to wait until she or someone else manages to improve conditions for both the hospital and its nurses.

== Cast ==
Actor	Role
Rosamund John	Hilary Clarke
Stewart Granger	Laurence Rains
Godfrey Tearle	Sir Marshall Freyne
Sophie Stewart	Christine Morris
Cathleen Nesbitt	Matron
Margaret Vyner	Pamela Siddell
John Laurie	Mr. Hervey
Joan Maude	Sister Catley
Mignon O'Doherty	Sister Tutor
Leslie Dwyer	Siddons
Wylie Watson	Diabetic Patient
Eric Micklewood	Trevor
Joyce Grenfell	Doctor Barrett
Ernest Thesiger	Chairman
Brefni O'Rorke	Lorrimer
Aubrey Mallalieu	Rev. J. Ashton
Megs Jenkins	Nurse

== Production ==
According to Rosamund John, Stewart Granger's character was "supposed to have a head injury, which would have meant having his hair shaved off and a bandage like a turban. He flatly refused so they had to change it to a broken rib." She also recalled Granger "got a contract because they knew he was on the up and up at that stage nobody had heard of him and he started throwing his weight around and that didn't go down well with people like the electricians and carpenters. I remember they painted his name and spelt it wrongly."

== Critical reception ==
The Radio Times wrote, "every hospital cliché has been scrubbed down and pressed into service – the cold efficient matron, the cantankerous patient and the handsome young doctor – and the wartime references give the film a home-front heroism that, while comforting for audiences of the time, now makes the whole thing seem as stiff as a starched uniform."

TV Guide noted "outstanding performances by the entire cast in this evenly directed and edited feature. The film is endowed with high production values that, at this time in the history of British cinema, were unusual."
