= Margaret Halsey =

American writer (1910–1997)

Margaret Halsey (February 13, 1910 – February 4, 1997) was an American writer who lived in the United Kingdom for a short time. Her first book With Malice Toward Some (1938) grew out of her experiences there. It was a witty and humorous bestseller, selling 600,000 copies. It won one of the early National Book Awards: the Most Original Book of 1938, voted by members of the American Booksellers Association.

According to her obituary in The New York Times, she was "a witty writer with an acute social concern, [and] was compared to Dorothy Parker and H. L. Mencken".

Several of her books were controversial or took on controversial subjects. She wrote two books inspired by her experiences volunteering as a hostess at the racially-integrated Stage Door Canteen in Times Square: a novel, Some of My Best Friends Are Soldiers, and Color Blind: A White Woman Looks at the Negro. The latter was banned in Georgia and favorably reviewed by Margaret Mead.The Pseudo-Ethic: A Speculation on American Politics and Morals was a defense of Alger Hiss.

== Life ==
Halsey was born in Yonkers, New York, and attended Skidmore College. In 1933, editor and author Max Eastman hired her as his secretary. With his help, she became an entry-level employee at Simon & Schuster. According to a statement at the end of With Malice Toward Some, she wrote: "In 1936-37, Margaret Halsey took an M.A. at Teachers College, but she has never taught."

She and Henry Simon married in 1935 and soon moved to Devon, England. Her letters to American relatives and friends inspired her brother-in-law, the publisher Richard L. Simon, to ask that she write what would become With Malice Toward Some. Halsey and Henry Simon divorced in 1944. A later marriage to Milton R. Stern ended in divorce in 1969. Their daughter, Deborah, survived both her parents despite brain cancer.

Halsey's struggles with agoraphobia and alcoholism were the focus of her 1977 book, No Laughing Matter: The Autobiography of a WASP.

She died in a nursing home in White Plains, New York.

== Works ==
- With Malice Toward Some (1938)
- Some of My Best Friends Are Soldiers (1944)
- Color Blind: A White Woman Looks at the Negro (1946)
- The Folks at Home (1952)
- This demi-paradise : a Westchester diary (1960)
- The Pseudo-Ethic: A Speculation on American Politics and Morals (1963)
- No Laughing Matter: The Autobiography of a WASP (1977)
