= Two Cities Films =

British film production company

- Opening logo from This Happy Breed
- Type: Private
- Industry: Films
- Founded: 1937
- Founder: Filippo Del Giudice; Mario Zampi
- Headquarters: London, England, United Kingdom; Rome, Italy
- Key people: Gregory Motton (CEO)
- Products: In Which We Serve; This Happy Breed; The Way Ahead; The Way to the Stars; Blithe Spirit
- Owner: Gregory Motton
- Parent: STV Studios (majority stake)
- Website: twocitiesfilms.com (Two Cities Films); twocitiestv.com (Two Cities Television)

Two Cities Films is a British-Italian film production company. Formed in 1937, it was originally envisaged as operating both in London and in Rome, and this fact gave the company its name.

The figures behind the company were the flamboyant, Italian-born Filippo Del Giudice, and his partner the multitalented Mario Zampi, born in Sora, Italy, who often worked in the dual role of director and producer. Two Cities produced a number of quintessentially English film classics including the most popular British film from the wartime period, In Which We Serve (1942).

The Two Cities films This Happy Breed, The Way Ahead, Laurence Olivier's patriotic epic Henry V (all 1944), The Way to the Stars, and Blithe Spirit (both 1945) contributed significantly to the high critical reputation acquired by the British cinema of the time.

In the mid-1940s Two Cities Films became part of the Rank Organisation. Earl St John became managing director.

Filippo Del Giudice had found himself forced to surrender the company's independence because of the strain on its finances produced by raising more than £470,000 for the production of Henry V. Under Rank the company produced key films such as Odd Man Out (1947), Hamlet (1948), and Vice Versa (1948).

Two Cities Films is now owned by Gregory Motton.

== New production ==
The company went back into production in 2017 with the shooting of The Four Gospels of Dracula the Messiah, a quartet of films: The Four Gospels of Dracula the Messiah, part one: A Voice Crying In The Wilderness, The Four Gospels of Dracula the Messiah part two; Conquering Death, The Four Gospels of Dracula the Messiah part three, The Seducer, The Four Gospels of Dracula the Messiah part four is to be released in January 2022, Lilith (2022), Dracula (2022)

== Select filmography ==
- 13 Men and a Gun (June 1938)
- French Without Tears (1939)
- Spy for a Day (Apr 1940)
- Freedom Radio (Feb 1941) aka The Voice in the Night
- Unpublished Story (Aug 1942)
- In Which We Serve (Sept 1942)
- It's Just the Way It Is (1943) - short
- The Gentle Sex (Apr 1943)
- The Flemish Farm (Sept 1943)
- The Lamp Still Burns (Nov 1943)
- The Demi-Paradise (Dec 1943)
- Tawny Pipit (Apr 1944)
- This Happy Breed (June 1944)
- The Way Ahead (June 1944)
- English Without Tears (July 1944)
- Mr. Emmanuel (Oct 1944)
- Don't Take It to Heart (Nov 1944)
- Henry V (Nov 1944)
- Out of Chaos (1944) - documentary short
- Blithe Spirit (May 1945)
- The Way to the Stars (June 1945)
- Wanted for Murder (May 1946)
- The Way We Live (1946)
- Beware of Pity (Jul 1946)
- Men of Two Worlds (Sept 1946)
- School for Secrets (Nov 1946)
- Carnival (Dec 1946)
- Hungry Hill (Jan 1947)
- Odd Man Out (Jan 1947)
- The October Man (Aug 1947)
- Fame Is the Spur (Sept 1947)
- Uncle Silas (Oct 1947)
- The Mark of Cain (Dec 1947)
- Vice Versa (Jan 1948)
- One Night with You (April 1948)
- Hamlet (May 1948)
- Mr. Perrin and Mr. Traill (Aug 1948)
- The Weaker Sex (Sept 1948)
- Sleeping Car to Trieste (Oct 1948)
- Woman Hater (Oct 1948)
- It's Hard to Be Good (Nov 1948)
- The History of Mr. Polly (1949)
- Cardboard Cavalier (March 1949)
- The Perfect Woman (May 1949)
- Adam and Evelyne (May 1949)
- Trottie True (Aug 1949)
- Madness of the Heart (Aug 1949)
- The Chiltern Hundreds (Sept 1949)
- The Rocking Horse Winner (Nov 1949)
- They Were Not Divided (March 1950)
- The Reluctant Widow (May 1950)
- Prelude to Fame (May 1950)
- Highly Dangerous (Dec 1950)
- Encore (Nov 1951)
- The Net (Feb 1953)
- Personal Affair (Oct 1953)
- Trouble in Store (Dec 1953)
- The Purple Plain (Sept 1954)
- One Good Turn (Jan 1955)
- To Paris with Love (Jan 1955)

=== New company ===
- The Four Gospels of Dracula the Messiah (2019)
- Dracula (2022)
- Lilith (2022)

=== Unmade films ===
- Ann Veronica (1950)

== Television ==
Two Cities Television was founded in the UK to produce returning dramas. With offices in London, Belfast, and New York, Two Cities aims to develop a diverse slate of projects with international, UK, and Ireland based broadcasters, streamers, and distributors. Two Cities Television is part of the STV Studios group of production labels.
