= My Son, My Son (novel) =

1938 novel by Howard Spring

- First US edition
- Author: Howard Spring
- Language: English
- Genre: Drama
- Publisher: Collins (UK); Viking Books (US)
- Publication date: 1938
- Media type: Print

My Son, My Son (also titled as O Absalom) is a 1938 novel by the British writer Howard Spring. It concerns two fathers: a successful novelist and poet; and a fervent Irish nationalist. Both these men put great effort into the raising of their sons, and the novel traces how the sons' characters are moulded by the fathers, with sometimes tragic consequences.

== Adaptations ==
In 1940 it was made into an American film My Son, My Son! released by United Artists and starring Madeleine Carroll and Brian Aherne. In 1979 it was again adapted as a BBC television series My Son, My Son.

== Bibliography ==
- Goble, Alan. The Complete Index to Literary Sources in Film. Walter de Gruyter, 1999.
- George Watson & Ian R. Willison. The New Cambridge Bibliography of English Literature, Volume 4. CUP, 1972.
