= Time and the Hour =

1957 novel by Howard Spring

- First edition (UK)
- Author: Howard Spring
- Language: English
- Genre: Drama
- Publisher: Collins (UK); Harper & Brothers (US)
- Publication date: 1957
- Media type: Print

Time and the Hour is a 1957 novel by the British writer Howard Spring. It is set in the Bradford area. The title is taken from a line of Shakespeare's Macbeth.

== Bibliography ==
- George Watson & Ian R. Willison. The New Cambridge Bibliography of English Literature, Volume 4. CUP, 1972.
