= Shabby Tiger =

1934 novel by Howard Spring

- First edition
- Author: Howard Spring
- Language: English
- Genre: Drama
- Publisher: William Collins, Sons
- Publication date: 1934
- Media type: Print

Shabby Tiger is a 1934 novel by the British writer Howard Spring. It was followed by a sequel Rachel Rosing in 1935.

A millionaire's son chooses to become an artist at the height of the Great Depression.

== Adaptation ==
In 1973, it was made into a television series Shabby Tiger, broadcast on ITV and starring John Nolan and Prunella Gee.

== Bibliography ==
- John Finch, Michael Cox & Marjorie Giles Granada Television--The First Generation. Manchester University Press, 2003.
