= The Way to the Stars =

1945 film by Anthony Asquith

- British DVD cover
- Directed by: Anthony Asquith; Charles Saunders (as director of Second Unit)
- Written by: Terence Rattigan; Anatole de Grunwald; Richard Sherman; John Pudney (poems)
- Produced by: Anatole de Grunwald
- Starring: Michael Redgrave; John Mills; Rosamund John; Douglass Montgomery
- Cinematography: Derrick Williams
- Edited by: Fergus McDonell
- Music by: Nicholas Brodszky; Charles Williams
- Production company: Two Cities Films
- Distributed by: Rank Organisation (UK); United Artists (U.S.)
- Release dates: 8 June 1945 (Premiere, London); 16 June 1945 (UK); 15 November 1945 (U.S.)
- Running time: 109 minutes (UK); 87 minutes (U.S.)
- Country: United Kingdom
- Language: English
- Box office: $63,434 (U.S. rentals)

The Way to the Stars is a 1945 Anglo-American black-and-white Second World War drama film made by Two Cities Films. The film was produced by Anatole de Grunwald, directed by Anthony Asquith, and stars Michael Redgrave, John Mills, Rosamund John, and Douglass Montgomery. In the United States it was shortened by 22 minutes, and the shortened version was distributed by United Artists under the title Johnny in the Clouds.

The screenplay for The Way to the Stars was written by noted dramatist Terence Rattigan, based on a scenario co-written by Rattigan with USAAF Captain Richard Sherman. The film is a significant reworking of Rattigan's 1942 play Flare Path. Rattigan, then a Royal Air Force Flight Lieutenant, was posted in 1943 to the RAF Film Production Unit to work on The Way to the Stars and Journey Together.

The title The Way to the Stars is often assumed to have been taken from the Latin motto of the RAF, Per ardua ad astra. However, the literal translation of the RAF motto is "Through adversity to the stars". The title of the shortened American version, Johnny in the Clouds, is derived from the poem recited in the film as a tribute to a dead aviator.

== Plot ==
The film opens on an abandoned airfield, the fictional RAF Station Halfpenny Field, and the opening scenes reference people and objects which will be shown later. A similar approach is used in the opening and closing scenes of an abandoned airfield in the later 1949 film Twelve O'Clock High, which is set on the fictional RAF Archbury.

In a flashback, Pilot Officer Peter Penrose is posted in the summer of 1940 as a pilot to the fictional No. 720 Squadron (Note: There were two units by that name during the Second World War: No. 720 Squadron RAF was a non-flying, airfield defence unit of the RAF Regiment. The only British flying unit known as 720 Squadron was a Fleet Air Arm squadron; during the war it was a flying boat unit attached to the Royal New Zealand Navy.), RAF, an operational bomber squadron flying Bristol Blenheims at a fictional new airfield, RAF Halfpenny Field. Penrose is a very new and inexperienced pilot who has only flown Blenheims for 15 hours. He is assigned to B Flight, under Flight Lieutenant David Archdale.

When No. 720 Squadron's commanding officer, Squadron Leader Carter (Trevor Howard, in his second, but first credited, film role), is shot down, Archdale takes over. While Penrose develops into a first-class pilot, he meets Iris Winterton, a young woman living with her domineering aunt at the Golden Lion Hotel in the nearby town. Archdale marries Miss Todd, the popular manager of the hotel, who is known to everyone as Toddy. The Archdales later have a son, Peter.

By May 1942, the squadron is now flying Douglas Boston bombers. When Penrose shows signs of strain from extensive combat, Archdale has him posted to controller school but is himself shot down and killed over France while Penrose is on his last mission. Penrose had been courting Iris, despite her aunt's disapproval, but Archdale's fate weighs heavily on his mind. Not wanting Iris to suffer if the same thing happened to him, he stops seeing her.

No. 720 Squadron is sent to the Middle East, but Penrose remains behind as a ground controller for a United States Army Air Forces B-17 Flying Fortress bombardment group, which takes over the airfield. He befriends USAAF Captain Johnny Hollis and Lieutenant Joe Friselli. On 17 August 1942 the American airmen participate in the first attack by the USAAF on Occupied France, later ruefully acknowledging that they underestimated the difficulties involved. Afterwards, Penrose is posted to flying duties with an RAF Avro Lancaster bomber squadron.

In 1944, now a squadron leader and Pathfinder pilot, Penrose makes an emergency landing at Halfpenny Field, where he once again meets Iris. Iris had decided to leave her aunt for good and join up. Toddy persuades a still-reluctant Penrose to propose to Iris, saying that she did not regret her own marriage in spite of her husband's death. Hollis, who has formed a platonic relationship with Toddy, is killed while trying to land his battle-damaged B-17 with a hung up bomb aboard, rather than safely bail out and risk crashing into the local village or another town.

The film ends with American and British airmen leaving the Golden Lion Hotel, watched by Toddy, as David's voice recites the poem "For Johnny".

== Cast ==
- Michael Redgrave as David Archdale
- John Mills as Peter Penrose
- Rosamund John as Miss Todd
- Douglass Montgomery as Johnny Hollis
- Stanley Holloway as Mr Palmer
- Renée Asherson as Iris Winterton
- Felix Aylmer as Reverend Charles Moss
- Basil Radford as "Tiny" Williams
- Bonar Colleano Jnr. as Joe Friselli
- Joyce Carey as Miss Winterton
- Trevor Howard as Squadron Leader Carter
- David Tomlinson as "Prune" Parsons
- Nicholas Stuart as Colonel Rogers (credited as Tryon Nichol)
- Bill Owen as "Nobby" Clarke (credited as Bill Rowbotham)
- Grant Miller as Lieutenant Wally Becker
- Jean Simmons as a singer

== Poetry ==
Two poems supposedly written by David Archdale were used in the film. They were written by John Pudney earlier in 1941 or 1942. The first poem is Missing. Archdale is portrayed as reciting it to Toddy shortly before their marriage, after his close friend Squadron Leader Carter is killed in action. Archdale tells Toddy that "I try and say things I feel that way sometimes. Sort of hobby" and tells her that she is the only person who knows he writes poetry.

"Missing"

Less said the better.
The bill unpaid, the dead letter,
No roses at the end,
Of Smith, my friend.

Last words don't matter,
And there are none to flatter
Words will not fill the post
Of Smith, the ghost.

For Smith, our brother,
Only son of loving mother,
The ocean lifted, stirred
Leaving no word.

The second and better-known of the two poems in the film is "For Johnny", depicted as having been found by Peter Penrose on a piece of paper after David Archdale's death. Penrose gives it to Toddy Archdale, who later in the film gives it to Johnny Hollis' friend Joe Friselli to read after Hollis is killed.

"For Johnny"

Do not despair
For Johnny-head-in-air;
He sleeps as sound
As Johnny underground.

Fetch out no shroud
For Johnny-in-the-cloud;
And keep your tears
For him in after years.

Better by far
For Johnny-the-bright-star,
To keep your head
And see his children fed.

== Production ==
During the war, Rattigan served in the Royal Air Force as a tail gunner and used his wartime experiences to help inspire his earlier stage play, Flare Path. In 1945 he was released from the service to help rewrite it with Anatole De Grunwald as The Way to the Stars screenplay. Although Michael Redgrave and John Mills were the leads, the film offers very early performances of two actors, who would become international film stars in later years: Jean Simmons and Trevor Howard.

Filming was mainly in North Yorkshire, and some of the locations remain little changed. RAF Catterick was used to film the RAF Halfpenny Field scenes, Bedale was used for street scenes outside the pub in the local small town, the Golden Lion Hotel in Northallerton was used as the pub and Constable Burton Hall was used as the USAAF headquarters.

Footage of B-17 Flying Fortresses landing and taking off was filmed at RAF Grafton Underwood in Northamptonshire. One of the USAAF aircrew involved recorded in his diary seeing B-17s of the 384th Bombardment Group (Heavy) and ground scenes including the crash of Captain Holliss' B-17 being filmed at Grafton Underwood.

As well as B-17s, the other aircraft used during filming were Avro Ansons, Bristol Blenheims, Hawker Hurricanes, and Douglas Bostons. They came from a variety of training and operational USAAF, RAF and Free French units, the Bostons being from 342 Squadron, RAF / Groupe de bombardement Lorraine.

There was a real airfield with a name resembling the fictional RAF Halfpenny Field, RAF Halfpenny Green in Staffordshire. However, it was not used in any way for this film. Unlike RAF Halfpenny Field, RAF Halfpenny Green was used for training pilots and not as a bomber airfield. It is now home to Wolverhampton Halfpenny Green Airport.

== Reception ==
On its initial British release, the film was popular, with one reviewer in June 1945 stating that "it must rank as one of the outstanding British films of the war years". However, it performed poorly in the US, where it was released post-war under the title Johnny in the Clouds, with a prologue added.

According to Kinemaotgraph Weekly the film was a "runner up" at the British box office in 1945.

Later reviews considered the film "... one of the more thoughtful of British war movies ..." and an "excellent drama about a British airfield and the men stationed there, focusing mainly on personal relationships in wartime.". The British Film Institute describes the film as "one of the most effective and understated films about the conflict made during the Second World War, though it features no combat scenes and only three (brief) shots from inside a cockpit". The BFI Screenonline reviewer stated that the film "effectively comments on the traditional emotional reticence of the British by weaving a critique of it into the fabric of the story, turning it into a theme of the film. The introduction in the film's second half of the American flyers (as exemplified by the wise-cracking Bonar Colleano, making his film debut) further emphasises this. It also puts into relief the film's main focus: Penrose's development from callow youth into a burned-out, emotionally detached pilot and his eventual return to life and love".
