= Fame Is the Spur (film) =

1947 film

Fame is the Spur
- Directed by: Roy Boulting
- Written by: Nigel Balchin; Howard Spring (novel)
- Produced by: John Boulting
- Starring: Michael Redgrave; Rosamund John; Bernard Miles; David Tomlinson
- Cinematography: Günther Krampf
- Edited by: Richard Best
- Music by: John Wooldridge
- Production company: Boulting Brotherrs in association with Two Cities Films
- Distributed by: General Film Distributors
- Release date: 23 September 1947
- Running time: 116 minutes
- Country: United Kingdom
- Language: English
- Budget: over $1 million

Fame is the Spur is a 1947 British drama film directed by Roy Boulting and starring Michael Redgrave, Rosamund John, Bernard Miles, David Tomlinson, Maurice Denham and Kenneth Griffith. It was written by Nigel Balchin based on the 1940 novel Fame Is the Spur by Howard Spring, which was believed to be based on the career of the Labour Party politician Ramsay MacDonald. Its plot involves a British politician who rises to power, abandoning on the way his radical views for more conservative ones.

== Plot ==
When Hamer Radshaw, a young man from a North country mill town, commits to help the poverty-stricken workers in his area, he takes as his Excalibur a sword passed down to him by his grandfather from the Battle of Peterloo, where it had been used against workers. As an idealistic champion of the oppressed, he rises to power as a Labour M.P., but is seduced by the trappings of power and finds himself the type of politician he originally despised.

== Cast ==
- Michael Redgrave as Hamer Radshaw
- Rosamund John as Ann
- Bernard Miles as Tom Hannaway
- Carla Lehmann as Lady Lettice
- Hugh Burden as Arnold Ryerson
- Marjorie Fielding as Aunt Lizzie
- Seymour Hicks as Old Buck
- Anthony Wager as Hamer as a boy
- Brian Weske as Ryerson as a boy
- Gerald Fox as Hannaway as a boy
- Jean Shepeard as Mrs Radshaw
- Guy Verney as Grandpa
- Percy Walsh as Suddaby
- David Tomlinson as Lord Liskead
- Charles Wood as Dai
- Milton Rosmer as magistrate
- Wylie Watson as Pendleton
- Ronald Adam as Radshaws' doctor
- Honor Blackman as Emma
- Campbell Cotts as meeting chairman
- Maurice Denham as prison doctor
- Kenneth Griffith as wartime miners' representative
- Roddy Hughes as wartime miners' spokesman
- Vi Kaley as old woman in election crowd
- Laurence Kitchin as Radshaws's secretary
- Philip Ray as doctor
- Gerald Sim as reporter
- Harry Terry as man in election crowd
- Iris Vandeleur as woman who opens front door
- H Victor Weske as wartime miners' representative
- Ben Williams as radical orator

== Critical reception ==
The Monthly Film Bulletin wrote: "This film shows the very polished technique to be expected of its director. It is excellently produced with an essentially north country institution, that of the knocker-up, and north country accents and atmosphere are, for the most part, well sustained where they are needed. Rosamund John gives a very natural performance, and her portrayal of Ann's attitude in the face of death must seem moving even to the most hardened viewer."

In The New York Times at the time of the 1949 American release, Bosley Crowther commented: "this John and Roy Boulting film has vivid authority and fascination... But, unfortunately, a full comprehension of the principal character in this tale is missed in the broad and extended panorama of his life that is displayed... Mr. Redgrave is glib and photogenic; he acts the 'lost leader' in a handsome style. But he does not bring anything out about him that is not stated arbitrarily."

The Radio Times reviewer David Parkinson has praised Redgrave's "powerhouse performance, with his gradual shedding of heartfelt beliefs as vanity replaces commitment having a chillingly convincing ring. But such is Redgrave's dominance that there's little room for other characters to develop or for any cogent social agenda."

According to Allmovie, the film is "sometimes slow-moving", but "is an interesting look into the reasons why the Labor [sic] and the Conservative factions are at loggerheads with each other in Great Britain".
