= Aimée Stuart =

English writer and playwright (1886–1981)

Aimée McHardy Stuart (July 1886 – 16 April 1981) was a writer and playwright who collaborated with her husband Philip Stuart on several successful plays and wrote for both film and television. She also wrote a popular memoir of her marriage to First World War flying ace, William A. Bond.

Born Amy McHardy in July 1886, she was the daughter of William Arnot McHardy, a commercial clerk, and his wife Mercy (Baker) McHardy of Glasgow, Scotland. She met her first husband William A. Bond in Paris, France where he worked as a journalist for the London Daily Mail. While in Paris, she changed her name to Aimée, and the couple openly lived and travelled together across Europe. They returned to England at the outbreak of the First World War, where Bill Bond joined the Kings Own Yorkshire Light Infantry, and Aimée returned to her parents’ home in St. Marylebone, London. Aimée and Bill were married in January 1917, and Bill transferred to the Royal Flying Corps. While serving with No. 40 Squadron, he became an ace but was posted missing on 22 July 1917 and later confirmed as killed in action. Using their correspondence, Aimée wrote a cathartic memoir of their wartime life together titled An Airman's Wife: A True Story of Lovers Separated by War, which was published in 1918. The memoir appeared in the United States as My Airman Over There.

Aimée later married playwright and author Philip Stuart, and together they collaborated on several successful London West End plays in the 1930s, including Lady Clara (1930), Nine Till Six (1930), Borrowed Clothes (1934), and Sixteen (1936). Several of these plays were later made into movies and/or adopted for television, including Nine Till Six (1932) and Borrowed Clothes (1934). After Stuart's death in 1936, Aimée continued writing on her own for theatre, film and television. She received a posthumous writing credit for Michael Winner's 1983 remake of the 1945 drama The Wicked Lady. For many years she lunched at the Ivy restaurant and shared her experience and knowledge with younger writers and actors Aimée died on 16 April 1981 in Brighton, East Sussex, England, at the age of 94.

== Selected works ==
=== With Philip Stuart ===
- 1925 The Cat's Cradle
- 1927 No Gentleman
- 1928 Clara Gibbings - filmed in 1934
- 1929 Her Shop
- 1930 Lady Clara
- 1930 Nine Till Six
- 1931 Supply and Demand
- 1934 Borrowed Clothes
- 1934 Sixteen
- 1935 Love of Women
- 1935 Full Circle
- 1936 Indian Summer

=== Independently ===
- 1938 Melodrama
- 1939 Summer Snow
- 1940 Jeannie
- 1945 Lady from Edinburgh
- 1949 Lace on Her Petticoat
