= Eric Hosking =

English photographer (1909–1991)

Eric Hosking OBE
- Born: Eric John Hosking; 2 October 1909; Chelsea, London, England
- Died: 22 February 1991 (aged 81)
- Occupations: Photographer, author
- Known for: Owl attack victim

Eric John Hosking OBE (2 October 1909 – 22 February 1991) was an English photographer noted for his bird photography.

== Life and career ==
Eric Hosking OBE, Hon FRPS, was a pioneering wildlife photographer preceded in Britain by Richard and Cherry Kearton and one of the first professional photographers to make a living predominantly from photographing birds. He was born on 2 October 1909 in Chelsea, London. His family moved to Crouch End, north London, during World War I. Hosking loved London and, although he travelled greatly in Britain and abroad, he never moved away from his north London home, where he developed his natural history photographic business. Hosking died suddenly on 22 February 1991, aged 81, shortly after returning from a Kenyan safari.

Starting out on a career in wildlife photography in 1929 was a bold move. Bird photography was the pastime of a select few who mainly took photographs of birds for their own interest, or to circulate among fellow enthusiasts and in clubs like the Zoological Photographic Club, founded in 1899.

With no financial backing other than understanding parents, who would lend the money necessary to buy film, Hosking began to develop a market for his wildlife photographs. His working year was divided; he photographed during the spring and summer, where birds were mainly photographed at the nest because, as explained below, pre-focussing was necessary. In autumn and winter, articles could be written for magazines like Picture Post and Country Life; and book ideas were developed and then illustrated with high numbers of good quality images, some taken using the then new Kodachrome colour film, making these books very desirable. Some books like Birds of the Day, published by Collins in 1944, sold more than 50,000 copies.

A turning point in Hosking's career came through an accident which happened on 12 May 1937. Returning to a tawny owl photographic hide late at night, he was struck in the face by the owl, its claw penetrating his left eye. The resulting infection meant choosing between losing one eye or probably going blind. The eye was removed and the ensuing publicity appeared in all the national newspapers, where his photographs were already in great demand. As soon as he was fit, he returned to the hide to continue taking pictures.

Evenings were often taken up with lectures. It was not unusual for Hosking to give 100 or more in a year, to audiences ranging from three to 3,000. During his lecturing career, many tens of thousands of people were entertained with lantern slides of British bird life. The many comments made by people from Hosking's generation suggest that this form of education had a profound effect on many, some of whom went on to establish the broad spectrum of modern conservation.

To fully appreciate Hosking's black and white bird photographs taken during the 1930s and 1940s, it is useful to understand how difficult it was to take them. Every step of the picture taking process was totally manual, and success relied on in-depth knowledge, experience and calculation. Without through-the-lens viewing (which came later with reflex cameras), the camera was pre-focussed with a distance scale to where the subject was expected to be. The exposure was manually calculated, working out the best F-stop and shutter speed combination, and hoping that the light intensity did not change before the picture was taken. The light sensitivity of the film was very low, about ISO 10. (Later, ISO 400 - and above - film became readily available, allowing much faster shutter speeds). The emulsion was often on a fragile glass base. Only one picture could be taken before reloading with a fresh, unexposed plate. Film holders could only be loaded in complete darkness, necessitating a light-proof changing-bag. It was quite common to have only 12 exposures for a day's photography. The glass negatives had to be developed in the darkroom at a later date and then printed as positive prints.

Since Hosking's death in 1991, the process has changed beyond recognition. Throughout his 60-year career he was, however, always keen to embrace new technology. With Cyril Newberry, he was the first to see the potential of flashbulbs for photographing nocturnal birds, when they first became available in the mid 1930s. In the late 1940s, again with Newberry, he was the first person to use electronic flash to record birds in flight. His pictures taken with this new lighting showed people images of birds never seen before.

It is possible to plot the growth in membership of organisations like the RSPB and the interest in conservation in general with the increasing availability of lavishly illustrated books, magazines and more recently television. Most of this growth took place during Hosking's lifetime. In her foreword to Classic Birds, a pictorial tribute to Hosking's work, Miriam Rothschild wrote:

Eric Hosking brought birds into all our lives. He opened our eyes to the beauty of their world, their grace and fascination. He probably achieved more for avian conservation than any other naturalist of our day.

== Charity ==
A charitable trust (the Eric Hosking Trust) was established in 1993 to commemorate Hosking's life and work. Its board of Trustees currently consists of Dawn Balmer, Professor Richard Chandler, Dr Jim Flegg, Robert Gillmor, David Hosking, Robin Hosking, Mark Hosking, Edward Keeble, and Paul Williams. Its stated aims are to sponsor ornithological research and other natural history projects through the media of photography, art and writing. The Trust has paid out over 30 bursaries to projects varying from the development of a reliable ageing criterion for British storm petrels to the production of a short animation about the spoon-billed sandpiper. The latter was drawn and coloured by children in countries along the migration route of this critically endangered species.

== Wildlife Photographer of the Year ==
Hosking headed the judging panel of the Wildlife Photographer of the Year awards in their early years. Hosking personified the competition's ethics. In his autobiography, An Eye for a Bird, he wrote of his strong objection to "unscrupulous methods", "dishonest photography" and the objectionable practice of passing off as 'wild and free' an animal that was neither, a position that the competition maintains today. For many years, one category in the competition was named in his honour.

== Personal life ==
Hosking married Dorothy Sleigh on 15 April 1939 at Ferme Park Baptist Church, the minister of which, whose manse was three doors away from Hosking's home, subsequently shared the use of his garage (Hosking drove a Rolls-Royce), and the couple brought up three children, Margaret, Robin and David, at the family home in Crouch Hall Road. Before her death in November 2005, Dorothy had moved to the Suffolk village of Debenham, to be near her youngest son, David, who carries on the family tradition of wildlife photography. Geoffrey Hosking is a nephew.

Hosking was president of the Nature Photographic Society, vice-president of the British Ornithologists' Union, the Royal Society for the Protection of Birds (RSPB), the British Naturalists' Association and honorary fellow of the Royal Photographic Society. He was awarded the Gold Medal of the RSPB in 1974, and received an OBE in 1977 for his natural history photography and work in conservation.

== Bibliography ==
- Friends at the Zoo (1933)
- Intimate Sketches from Bird Life (1940)
- Art of Bird Photography (1944)
- Birds of the Day (1944)
- Birds of the Night (1945)
- More Birds of the Day (1946)
- The Swallow (1946)
- Masterpieces of Bird Photography (1947)
- Birds in Action (1949)
- Birds Fighting (1955)
- Bird Photography as a Hobby (1961)
- Nesting Birds (1967)
- An Eye for a Bird (1970) Foreword by Prince Philip
- Eric Hosking's Birds – Fifty Years of Photographing Wildlife with Kevin MacDonnell, Pelham Books (1979) ISBN 0-7207-1163-0
  - Foreword by Tory Peterson
  - Dedicated "To the memory of my mother and father who understood my love of birds"
