= Ray Sturgess =

Ray Sturgess (October 28, 1909 in London - January 2000 in Hounslow, London), was a British cinematographer and camera operator. He worked as a cameraman on the Academy Award-winning Hamlet and Seven Days to Noon in 1948, Chance of a Lifetime in 1960, and Station Six-Sahara in 1962. In the mid-1960s he shot seven episodes of The Saint and 25 episodes of The Protectors in 1972–3.
