= Howard Spring =

Welsh writer (1889–1965)

Howard Spring

Howard Spring (10 February 1889 – 3 May 1965) was a Welsh author and journalist. He began his writing career as a journalist but from 1934 produced a series of best-selling novels for adults and children. The most successful was Fame Is the Spur (1940), which was later adapted into a film starring Michael Redgrave, and later still a BBC TV series (1982) starring Tim Pigott-Smith and David Hayman.

== Biography ==
Howard Spring was born in Cardiff, the son of a jobbing gardener. He was forced to leave school at the age of twelve, when his father died, to start work as an errand boy. He later became an office boy at a firm of chartered accountants in Cardiff Docks and then a messenger at the offices of the South Wales Daily News. He was keen to train as a reporter, and spent his leisure time learning shorthand and taking evening classes at Cardiff University, where he studied English, French, Latin, mathematics and history. He graduated to be a reporter on both the morning and evening editions of the South Wales Daily News.

In 1911 he joined the Yorkshire Observer in Bradford before moving in 1915 to the Manchester Guardian, but was there only a few months before he was called up for the Army Service Corps as a shorthand trained clerk, serving in France in Douglas Haig's General Headquarters.

After the war, he returned to the Guardian, where he worked as a reporter. C. P. Scott, the editor, apparently regarded Spring's reporting skills highly; he wrote of Spring that: "Nobody does a better 'descriptive' or a better condensation of a difficult address." Whilst working for the Guardian, Spring lived in the suburb of Didsbury. In 1931, after reporting on a political meeting at which Lord Beaverbrook was the speaker, Beaverbrook was so impressed by Spring's piece (Spring described Beaverbrook as "a pedlar of dreams", which took Beaverbrook's fancy) that he arranged for him to be offered a post with the Evening Standard in London as a book reviewer. Spring described the offer as "irresistible", and the appointment proved successful.

At the same time, Spring was developing his ambitions as a writer; his first book, Darkie and Co., a children's story, came out in 1932, followed by his first novel, Shabby Tiger, which was set in Manchester, published by William Collins, Sons in 1934. Shabby Tiger was adapted as a television series of the same title produced by Granada Television in 1973. It starred John Nolan as Nick and Prunella Gee as Anna, with Sharon Maughan making her TV debut as the glamorous and ambitious Rachel Rosing. A sequel to the novel followed a year later, Rachel Rosing (Collins, 1935). Both were published in the US in 1936.

The children's story Sampson's Circus, illustrated by Steven Spurrier and published by Faber & Faber in 1936, was one of two commended runners up for the Library Association's inaugural Carnegie Medal, recognising the year's outstanding contribution to children's literature by a British subject.

His first major success in the adult market came with My Son, My Son (1937), originally titled O Absalom. It gained success in America, listed as a national fiction best seller in The English Journal for eight consecutive months, starting in July 1948. The novel was adapted as the American 1940 film My Son, My Son! and later made for television by the BBC in 1977. WorldCat libraries report editions in Chinese, German, Hebrew and four other languages.

In 1939 Spring moved to Mylor in Cornwall to become a full-time writer. (His wife Marion's father had a house at St Mawes.) In 1940, his best-known work appeared: Fame Is the Spur, the story of a Labour leader's rise to power. During the war years Spring wrote two other novels, Hard Facts (1944) and Dunkerley's (1946).

In 1947 Spring and his wife moved to Falmouth, The White Cottage in Fenwick Road, and in the post-war period he published There Is No Armour (1948), The Houses in Between (1951), A Sunset Touch (1953), These Lovers Fled Away (1955), Time and the Hour (1957), All the Day Long (1959), I Met a Lady (1961), and his last book was Winds of the Day (1964). Spring also produced three volumes of autobiography: Heaven Lies About Us, A Fragment of Infancy (1939); In the Meantime (1942); and And Another Thing (1946), later published in one volume as The Autobiography of Howard Spring (Collins, 1972).

During this period Spring served eight years as President of the prestigious Royal Cornwall Polytechnic Society and as a Director of the Falmouth School of Art and President of the Cornish Drama League. The last was well known for producing plays at the open-air Minack Theatre on the cliffs near Land's End.

Spring was a successful writer, who combined a wide understanding of human character with technical skill as a novelist. His method of composition was painstaking. Each morning he would shut himself in his room and write a thousand words, steadily building up to novels of around 150,000 words. He rarely made major alterations to his writings.

Howard Spring died of a stroke. In 1967, his widow, Marion Spring, wrote an affectionate story of their life together, called Howard, with a foreword by A. L. Rowse. It was published by Collins.

== Works ==
- Darkie And Co, (1932)
- Shabby Tiger, (1934)
- The World's Greatest Detective Stories, (1934)
- Rachel Rosing, (1935)
- Sampson's Circus, (1936)
- O Absalom (title in US: My Son, My Son), (1938)
- Book Parade, (1938)
- Heaven Lies About Us, (1939)
- Fame Is the Spur, (1940)
- Tumbledown Dick: All People And No Plot, (1939)
- All They Like Sheep, (1940)
- In The Meantime, (1942)
- This War We Wage, (1942) [with E M DELAFIELD & Herbert MORRISON]
- Hard Facts, (1944)
- And Another Thing, (1946)
- Dunkerley's, (1946)
- There Is No Armour, (1948)
- Christmas Honeymoon, (1949)
- Christmas Awake, (1949)
- The Houses in Between, (1951)
- Jinny Morgan, (1952, play)
- A Sunset Touch, (1953)
- Three Plays, (1953) [Jinny Morgan; The Gentle Assassin; St George...]
- These Lovers Fled Away, (1955)
- Time and the Hour, (1957)
- All the Day Long, (1959)
- I Met a Lady, (1961)
- Winds of the Day, (1964)

== See also ==
- The Queen's Book of the Red Cross
