= Temple of Artemis-Nanaia =

Coordinates: 34.74647516655484°N 40.73071087936018°E

View of the excavations

Statue of Aphrodite, Louvre AO 20126

The Temple of Artemis-Nanaia is the largest temple in the ancient Dura-Europos. It is dedicated to the Greco-Semitic fertility goddess Artemis-Nanaia. Nanaia is a Mesopotamian goddess who, as is known from other sources, was equated with Artemis.

The temple was mostly uncovered in 1922/1923 under the direction of Franz Cumont. The results of the excavations were published in 1926.

== Temple ==
It is the oldest temple in the city of Dura-Europos; it was likely built during the Hellenistic period but underwent several modifications over time. It consists of two parts. The sanctuary itself is located in the south; it comprises a vestibule—partially decorated with wall paintings—with three inner chapels situated behind it. In front of the main structure lie two chapels or rooms, the function of which remains uncertain. A statue of Aphrodite was discovered in one of these (to the left of the entrance), leading the excavators to designate the space as the "Chapel of Aphrodite."

The structure itself stands within a courtyard, which is bordered on two sides by rooms. Some of these rooms feature built-in stone benches along the walls. One of the rooms was also quite elaborately decorated with ornamental stucco moldings. Opposite the entrance to the temple lies the main gateway facing the street. The courtyard continues into the northern section of the complex. Within this norther part of the courtyard stands an odeon—a small theater.

Various statues were found within the temple complex. One previously mentioned marble figure, carved from Parian marble, depicts Aphrodite with one foot resting on the shell of a tortoise. The head of the statue is missing. The work is executed in a purely Hellenistic style and is almost certainly an import. It may be a copy of a statue by Phidias. According to Pausanias, there was a statue of Aphrodite in Elis that depicted her with one foot resting on a tortoise. A second statue is life-sized and shows a woman who is almost entirely veiled, though her face remains exposed. The statue is made of plaster and stands on a base that once bore an inscription. Although the inscription is poorly preserved, it likely identifies the woman as a local donor. The work is probably of local origin. Also noteworthy are two small plaster statuettes representing Nike, which are executed in a Greco-Parthian style. Another statue, of which only the upper portion survives, likely represents Artemis.

Numerous inscriptions originate from local donors. One of these belongs to Ammonius, son of Apollophanes, who endowed a chapel in the year 31/32 AD. Various inscriptions make it possible to reconstruct the genealogy of a prominent family in the city.
