= Dercyllides =

Greek philosopher

Dercyllides was an ancient Greek Platonist philosopher. There survive only quotations or paraphrases of his work in later writers, no complete works.

He is known to have to arranged Plato's works into tetralogies, similar to the edition of Thrasyllus of Mendes, whose arrangement is still used today. Whether Dercyllides or Thrasyllus came first is not known, however.

== Works ==
Simplicius records Porphyry as quoting from a work by Dercyllides titled Platonic Philosophy, which was at least eleven books in length. Theon of Smyrna quotes from another work titled On the Spindle and Whorls in Plato's Republic.
