= Thrasyllus of Mendes =

1st-century AD Egyptian Greek astrologer and philosopher

Thrasyllus of Mendes (/θrəˈsɪləs/; Ancient Greek: Θράσυλλος Thrasyllos), also known as Thrasyllus of Alexandria and by his Roman name Tiberius Claudius Thrasyllus (fl. second half of the 1st century BC and first half of the 1st century – died 36,), was a Greek Egyptian grammarian and literary commentator. Thrasyllus was an astrologer and a personal friend of the Roman emperor Tiberius, as mentioned in the Annals by Tacitus and The Twelve Caesars by Suetonius.

== Background ==
Thrasyllus was a Greek Egyptian from unknown origins, as his family and ancestors were contemporaries that lived under the rule of the Ptolemaic Kingdom. He originally was either from Mendes or Alexandria. Thrasyllus is often mentioned in various secondary sources as coming from Alexandria (as mentioned in the Oxford Classical Dictionary) as no primary source confirms his origins.

== Tiberius ==
Thrasyllus encountered Tiberius during the period of Tiberius' voluntary exile on the Greek island of Rhodes, some time between 1 BC and 4 AD. Thrasyllus became the intimate and celebrated servant of Tiberius, and Tiberius developed an interest in Stoicism and astrology from Thrasyllus.

He predicted that Tiberius would be recalled to Rome and officially named the successor to Augustus. When Tiberius returned to Rome, Thrasyllus accompanied him and remained close to him. During the reign of the emperor Tiberius, Thrasyllus served as his skilled Court Astrologer both in Rome and, later, in Capri. As Tiberius held Thrasyllus in the highest honor, he rewarded him for his friendship by giving Roman citizenship to him and his family.

The daughter-in-law of Tiberius, his niece Livilla, reportedly consulted Thrasyllus during her affair with Sejanus, Tiberius' chief minister. Thrasyllus persuaded Tiberius to leave Rome for Capri while clandestinely supporting Sejanus. The grandson-in-law of Thrasyllus, Naevius Sutorius Macro, carried out orders that destroyed Sejanus, whether with Thrasyllus’ knowledge is unknown. He remained on Capri with Tiberius, advising the Emperor on his relationship with the various claimants to his succession. Thrasyllus was an ally who favored Tiberius’ great-nephew Caligula, who was having an affair with his granddaughter, Ennia Thrasylla.

In 36 AD, Thrasyllus is said to have made Tiberius believe he would survive another ten years. With this false prediction, Thrasyllus saved the lives of a number of Roman nobles who would be suspected in falsely plotting against Tiberius. Tiberius, believing in Thrasyllus, was confident that he would outlive any plotters, and so failed to act against them. Thrasyllus predeceased Tiberius, so did not live to see the realization of his prediction that Caligula would succeed Tiberius.

== Academic work ==
Thrasyllus was a grammarian (i.e. literary scholar) by profession. He edited the written works of Plato and Democritus. According to the Encyclopaedia Judaica, he wrote that the Exodus of the Israelites from Egypt took place in 1690 BC. The sections include Dedumose I, Ipuwer Papyrus, and Shiphrah.

He was author of the astrological text Pinax, or Table, which is lost but has been summarized in later sources, such as Catalogus Codicum Astrologorum Graecorum (8/3: 99–101), which borrows notions of Hellenistic astrology found in Petosiris and Hermes Trismegistus, an early pseudepigraphical source of astrology. Pinax was known and cited by the later astrological writers Vettius Valens, Porphyry, and Hephaistio.

== Family and issue ==
Thrasyllus may have married a member of the royal family of Commagene (whose name is sometimes given as "Aka"), though this has been questioned recently. He had two known children:

- an unnamed daughter who married the Eques Lucius Ennius. She bore Ennius, a daughter called Ennia Thrasylla, who became the wife of Praetorian prefect Naevius Sutorius Macro, and perhaps a son called Lucius Ennius who was the father of Lucius Ennius Ferox, a Roman Soldier who served during the reign of the Roman emperor Vespasian from 69 until 79
- a son called Tiberius Claudius Balbilus, through whom he had further descendants

== In fiction ==
Thrasyllus is a character in the novel series, written by Robert Graves, I, Claudius and Claudius the God. Thrasyllus' predictions are always correct, and his prophecies are equally far-reaching. Thrasyllus predicts Jesus of Nazareth's crucifixion and that his religion shall overtake the Roman Pagan Religion. Similarly towards the end of his life it is explained that his final prophecy was misinterpreted by Tiberius. Thrasyllus states that "Tiberius Claudius will be emperor in 10 years," leading Tiberius to brashly criticize and mock Caligula, whereas his prophecy is correct as Claudius' name is "Tiberius Claudius".

In the TV miniseries adaptation of the novels, Thrasyllus was played by Kevin Stoney, who had previously played him in the 1968 ITV series The Caesars.

In contrast, Thrasyllus and his descendants are presented as power-hungry charlatans in the novel series Romanike.

== Sources ==
- Encyclopaedia Judaica
- Thrasyllus’ article at ancient library
- F.H. Cramer, Astrology in Roman Law and Politics, American Philosophical Society, Philadelphia, PA, 1954
- P. Robinson Coleman-Norton and F. Card Bourne, Ancient Roman Statutes, The Lawbook Exchange Limited, 1961
- B. Levick, Tiberius: The Politician, Routledge, 1999
- M. Zimmerman, G. Schmeling, H. Hofmann, S. Harrison and C. Panayotakis (eds.), Ancient Narrative, Barkhuis, 2002
- R. Beck, Beck on Mithraism: Collected Works With New Essays, Ashgate Publishing Limited, 2004
- J. H. Holden, A History of Horoscopic Astrology, American Federation of Astrology, 2006
- Royal genealogy of Mithradates III of Commagene at rootsweb
- Royal genealogy of Aka II of Commagene at rootsweb
- Genealogy of daughter of Tiberius Claudius Thrasyllus and Aka II of Commagene at rootsweb
