= Lucius Ennius =

1st century AD Roman eques (knight)

Lucius Ennius was a Roman Eques who lived in the second half of the 1st century BC and first half of the 1st century.

Little is known about the origins of Ennius, however he may have been originally from the Roman province of Creta et Cyrenaica. Ennius was a member of the gens Ennia, hence he may have been a relative of the poet Ennius and Manius Ennius, a Roman soldier who served with Germanicus in 14 AD on the Rhine River frontier.

In 22, Ennius was accused of treason by the Roman Senate, for having converted a statue of the Roman emperor Tiberius to the common use of silver plate. However Tiberius forbade Ennius for this matter to be put on trial and saved him from prosecution, although the Roman Senate did not approve of the actions of the emperor. After this event, no more is known of Ennius.

At an unknown date sometime in the early 1st century, Ennius married a Roman noblewoman from Alexandria in the Roman Province of Egypt who was of Greek, Armenian and Median descent named Claudia Thrasylla. She was the daughter of Thrasyllus of Mendes and Aka II of Commagene. Thrasyllus was an Egyptian Greek grammarian and literary commentator who served as the astrologer and became the personal friend of the Emperor Tiberius, while Aka was a princess from the Kingdom of Commagene. His brother-in-law was Tiberius Claudius Balbilus.

Ennius had a daughter named Ennia Thrasylla who married the Praetorian prefect of the Praetorian Guard, Naevius Sutorius Macro. Ennius may also have had a son called Lucius Ennius who was the father of Lucius Ennius Ferox, a Roman soldier who served during the reign of the Roman emperor Vespasian from 69 until 79.

== Sources ==
- Tacitus, Annales
- P. Robinson Coleman-Norton & F. Card Bourne, Ancient Roman Statutes, The Lawbook Exchange Limited, 1961
- B. Levick, Tiberius: The Politician, Routledge, 1999
- R. Beck, Beck on Mithraism: Collected Works With New Essays, Ashgate Publishing Limited, 2004
- J.H. Holden, A History of Horoscopic Astrology, American Federation of Astrology, 2006
