= Kevin Stoney =

English actor (1921–2008)

- Born: Kevin Thomas Harvest Stoney; 22 January 1921; Nowgong, Assam Province, British India
- Died: 22 January 2008 (aged 87); Chiswick, London, England
- Resting place: Upperby Cemetery, Carlisle, Cumbria, England
- Occupation: Actor
- Notable work: Mavic Chen, Tobias Vaughn and Tyrum in Doctor Who

Kevin Stoney (22 January 1921 – 22 January 2008) was a British actor. He was best known for his television roles, in which he became familiar for his "portrayal of establishment types".

== Career ==
During the Second World War, Stoney served with the Royal Air Force. On television, he appeared in three serials of the science fiction series Doctor Who over a period of ten years, playing Mavic Chen in The Daleks' Master Plan (1965-66), Tobias Vaughn in The Invasion (1968) and Tyrum in Revenge of the Cybermen (1975). Stoney also appeared in two episodes of another BBC science fiction series, Blake's 7, playing Councillor Joban in the episode Hostage and Ardus in the episode Animals. He also played the astrologer Thrasyllus in the 1976 BBC adaptation of I, Claudius, a role he had earlier played in Granada Television's 1968 series The Caesars.

Stoney's other credits include The Adventures of Robin Hood, The Saint, Danger Man, The Avengers, Dr. Finlay's Casebook, The Prisoner, Softly, Softly, Man in a Suitcase, The Troubleshooters, Doomwatch, Freewheelers, Z-Cars, The Tomorrow People, Ace of Wands, Special Branch, The Onedin Line, Fall of Eagles, Space: 1999, The New Avengers, Quatermass, Hammer House of Horror, Bergerac, All Creatures Great and Small, The Bill and in the highest-rated episode of Inspector Morse.

== Death allegation ==
In 1985, it was reported in the Doctor Who fan magazine DWB that Stoney had died at the age of 64, but in 1987 he made an appearance at a Doctor Who convention to prove he was very much alive, to the shock of the fans. He retired in 1993.

== Illness and death ==
Stoney died on his 87th birthday, 22 January 2008, in Chiswick, after a long battle with skin cancer.

== Selected filmography ==
=== Film ===
Year	Title	Role	Notes	Ref.
1957	Interpol	Policeman	uncredited	
1957	How to Murder a Rich Uncle	Bar Steward		
1960	The Man Who Was Nobody	Joe		
1961	Return of a Stranger	Wayne		
1961	Shadow of the Cat	Father	uncredited	
1961	Cash on Demand	Detective Inspector Bill Mason		
1962	Strongroom	Police Sergeant		
1962	Jigsaw	Mr. Gardner	uncredited	
1962	The Boys	Police Inspector who is quizzed by QCS at the Trial	uncredited	
1963	On the Run	Wally Lucas		
1963	Murder at the Gallop	Doctor Markwell		
1968	The Blood Beast Terror	Granger		
1969	The Assassination Bureau	Blind Beggar	uncredited	
1969	Guns in the Heather	Enhardt		
1979	All Quiet on the Western Front	Hollerstein	uncredited	
1982	Ivanhoe	Fitzurse		
1983	The Dresser	C. Rivers Lane		
1984	Pope John Paul II	Bishop Dygat		
1985	Ordeal by Innocence	Solicitor		

=== Television ===
Year	Title	Role	Notes	Ref.
1958	Armchair Theatre	George Mannering QC	Episode: Breach of Marriage	
1958 – 1960	The Adventures of Robin Hood	Various	4 episodes	
1959	Interpol Calling	Onno	Episode: No Flowers for Onno	
1959	The Third Man	Johnson	Episode: The Best Policy	
1960	The Four Just Men	Sir Harold Tyler	Episode: The Survivor	
1961	The Blackness	David Owens	All 6 episodes	
1961	Armchair Theatre	Father	Episode: A Degree of Murder	
1961	The Cheaters	Simpson	Episode: Case of George Peterson	
1962	Suspense	Clarence Rimmer	Episode: Fantasy and Fugue	
1963	Moonstrike	German Officer	Episode: No Heroics	
1964	Our Man at St. Mark's	Hopkins	Episode: A Question of Tactics	
1965	Danger Man	Papa Buchler	Episode: Say It With Flowers	
1965	Dr. Finlay's Casebook	Mr. Andrews	Episode: The Phantom Piper of Tonachbrae	
1965	Orlando	Jack Adler	2 episodes	
1965	The Saint	Dr. Farrere	Episode: Siboa	
1965	Theatre 625	Peter Egerton	Episode: The Siege of Manchester	
1965 – 1966	Doctor Who	Mavic Chen	Serial: The Daleks' Master Plan (11 episodes)	
1966	Watch the Birdies	Lazlo Bergmann	1 episode	
1966	Thirteen Against Fate	Rinquet	Episode: The Traveller	
1966	Emergency Ward 10	Mr. Mellor	Episode: A Little Learning	
1966	The Power Game	Edward Contini	Episode: A Matter for Speculation	
1967	The Avengers	Sir Gerald Bancroft	Episode: Mission: Highly Improbable	
1967	Man in a Suitcase	Barman	Episode: All That Glitters	
1967	Mr. Rose	Martin Strand	Episode: The Black Beast	
1967	The Prisoner	Colonel J	Episode: The Chimes of Big Ben	
1967	Softly, Softly	Crossman	Episode: Pieces of Silver	
1968	The Caesars	Thrasyllus	2 episodes	
1968	Doctor Who	Tobias Vaughan	Serial: The Invasion (8 episodes)	
1968 – 1971	Z-Cars	Blind Wol/ Arthur Swainson	2 episodes	
1969	The First Churchills	Archbishop Sandcroft	Episode: Trial of Strength	
1969	Out of the Unknown	Calton	Episode: The Fosters	
1969	The Troubleshooters	Dr. Van Rhysman	Episode: You Want a Clockwork Nightingale	
1970	Ace of Wands	Bank Manager	2 episodes	
1970	Doomwatch	Prof. Hal Symonds	Episode: The Plastic Eaters	
1970	Parkin's Patch	Stanley Brotherton	Episode: Fox Among the Chickens	
1970	Villette	Count de Bassompierre	2 episodes	
1970	Special Branch	Drysdale	Episode: Love from Doris	
1971	Freewheelers	Commander Caine	6 episodes	
1971	The Onedin Line	Vandroome	Episode: Mutiny	
1971	Paul Temple	Wilson	Episode: Long Ride to Red Gap	
1972	Harriet's Back in Town	George Moffatt	4 episodes	
1972	War and Peace	Marshall Benningsen	Episode: Escape	
1973	The Adventurer	Miesner	Episode: The Solid Gold Hearse	
1973	Crown Court	Nathaniel Stockman	Episode: Public Lives (2 parts)	
1973	The Tomorrow People	Steen	Serial: The Vanishing Earth (4 episodes)	
1973	Van der Valk	Kemerling	Episode: A Man of No Importance	
1974	Beryl's Lot	Priest	Episode: Naughty Boy, Naughty Girl	
1974	Fall of Eagles	Father John	Episode: The Last Tsar	
1975	Doctor Who	Tyrum	Serial: Revenge of the Cybermen (3 episodes)	
1976	I, Claudius	Thrasyllus	3 episodes	
1976	The New Avengers	Tomkins	Episode: Cat Amongst the Pigeons	
1976	Space: 1999	Talos	Episode: The Last Enemy	
1978	Emmerdale	Major Vivian Deyner	8 episodes	
1979	Thomas & Sarah	George Aston	Episode: The Biters Bit	
1979	Quatermass	Prime Minister	Episode: What Lies Beneath	
1979 – 1981	Blake's 7	Councillor Joban/ Ardus	2 episodes	
1980	Hammer House of Horror	Rothwell	Episode: The Thirteenth Reunion	
1981	Sons and Lovers	Mr. Braithwaite	1 episode	
1981	When the Boat Comes In	Mr. Reamer	Episode: Oh, My Charming Billy Boy	
1981 – 1984	Bergerac	"Horatio" Nelson	4 episodes	
1984	The Brief	Mr. Mather	Episode: People	
1986	Call Me Mister	Commisionaire	3 episodes	
1988	All Creatures Great and Small	Sir William Massingham	Episode: One of Nature's Little Miracles	
1988	Hannay	Brim	Episode: A Point of Honour	
1989	Wish Me Luck	Father Giraud	1 episode	
1991	The Bill	Mr. Macinally	Episode: A Corporal of Horse	
1993	Alleyn Mysteries	Political Speaker	Episode: The Nursing Home Murder	
1993	Inspector Morse	Herionymous St. John	Episode: The Day of the Devil	
