= Hugo Williams =

English poet, journalist and travel writer (born 1942)

Hugo Williams FRSL
- Born: 20 February 1942 (age 84); Windsor, Berkshire, England
- Education: Eton College
- Occupations: Poet; journalist; travel writer
- Spouse: Hermine Demoriane (1965–present)
- Children: 1 daughter
- Parents: Hugh Williams; Margaret Vyner
- Relatives: Simon Williams (brother)
- Writing career
- Language: English
- Years active: 1965–present
- Notable awards: Eric Gregory Award, 1966; Cholmondeley Award, 1971; Geoffrey Faber Memorial Prize, 1980; T. S. Eliot Prize, 1999; Queen's Gold Medal for Poetry, 2004

Hugo Williams FRSL (born Hugh Anthony Mordaunt Vyner Williams on 20 February 1942) is an English poet, journalist and travel writer. He received the T. S. Eliot Prize in 1999 and Queen's Gold Medal for Poetry in 2004.

== Family and early life ==
Williams was born in 1942 in Windsor, Berkshire. He was the eldest child of the actor and playwright Hugh Williams and his second wife, the model, actress and playwright Margaret Vyner. His brother is the actor Simon Williams. His sister Polly, an actress, died of cancer in 2004 at the age of 54.

Hugh Williams enjoyed success as an actor during the 1930s, but his career waned following his service in the Second World War, during which he sustained injuries. He declared bankruptcy in the early 1950s but the family's fortunes revived when he and his wife began collaborating as playwrights. They found success with the comedy The Grass is Greener which was first staged in London's West End in 1956.

Hugo Williams attended Lockers Park School and Eton College. While a student at Eton, he had several poems published in the London Magazine.

== Career ==
=== Poetry ===
Williams's early poems were influenced by poets associated with The Movement, particularly John Wain and Thom Gunn. He received an Eric Gregory Award for his first book of poems, Symptoms of Loss, which was published in 1965. Philip Larkin included "The Butcher", a poem from this collection, in his 1973 anthology The Oxford Book of Twentieth Century English Verse. The poem also attracted the attention of the poet, editor and literary critic Ian Hamilton, who became Williams's mentor and "perfect reader". Williams's poems appeared in The Review and The New Review, literary magazines edited by Hamilton in the 1960s and 1970s. In 1969, The Review published a pamphlet of Williams's poems as part of a series exemplifying the magazine's "taste for spare, emotionally intense, tip-of-the-iceberg, occasionally gnomic poems".

His second book of poems, Sugar Daddy, appeared in 1970. In 1971, Williams received a Cholmondeley Award, which is given annually by the Society of Authors to "recognise the achievement and distinction of individual poets" chosen "for their general body of work and contribution to poetry". In 1980, for his fourth poetry book, Love-Life, Williams shared the Geoffrey Faber Memorial Prize with George Szirtes. The Faber prize is awarded to "that volume of verse or prose fiction first published originally in this country during the two years preceding the year in which the award is given which is, in the opinion of the judges, of the greatest literary merit".

Williams's style evolved away from "Review-style lyrical spareness" while his subject matter became more personal and intimate in nature, culminating in his 1985 collection Writing Home, which the poet Mick Imlah called a "classic of creative autobiography". In it, according to the poet and critic Michael Hofmann, he made a "complete and unexpected break with the tenets of economy, ceremony, care, melancholy and a kind of Oriental exquisiteness" that had characterized his earlier work and began a "loosening up" that led his later work to "the borderline between poetry and prose" while bringing in "more humour, sex, slapstick, and more of the world". Williams credits his reading of Robert Lowell's Life Studies with the change, remarking that he was "well into my career before I started writing about mummy and daddy and all that". Karl Miller, who published many of Williams's poems in the London Review of Books during his tenure as editor, wrote in 1995 that his work was most admired for its "directness, naturalness, unencumberedness", while The London Magazine in 2014 described the poems in I Knew the Bride as "blessed with a piercing clarity and unfailing readability".

Williams's 1999 book Billy's Rain won the T. S. Eliot Prize, which "is awarded annually to the best new collection of poetry in English published in the UK or the Republic of Ireland". In 2002, Faber published his Collected Poems, for which he received the Queen's Gold Medal for Poetry in 2004.

Billy's Rain deals with a five-year long love affair. The subjects of later books include the death of his younger sister Polly from cancer (I Knew the Bride) and his experiences undergoing dialysis and a kidney transplant (Lines Off).

=== Other work ===
Williams worked as an editor at The London Magazine from 1961 to 1970. As a journalist and columnist he has written on theatre for The Sunday Correspondent (1989–1991), film for Harper's & Queen (1993–1998), popular music for Punch, and television for the New Statesman (1983–1988), where he was also poetry editor from 1984 to 1993.

He was a regular contributor to the "Freelance" column in The Times Literary Supplement from its beginning in 1988. A collection of his columns was published by Faber and Faber in 1995 as Freelancing: Adventures of a Poet.

His first book of travel writing, All the Time in the World, published in 1966, described his trip around the world at the age of 21, financed by his father in order "to break a trust fund". A second travel book, No Particular Place to Go, appeared in 1981.

== Personal life ==
Williams has been married to the singer and writer Hermine Demoriane since 1965. They have one daughter, Murphy Williams. He bought a house in the Islington district of London in 1966 and has lived there ever since. Williams received a successful kidney transplant in 2014, after undergoing dialysis for several years.

== Prizes and honours ==
- 1966: Eric Gregory Award
- 1971: Cholmondeley Award
- 1980: Geoffrey Faber Memorial Prize for Love-Life
- 1988: Fellow of the Royal Society of Literature
- 1999: T. S. Eliot Prize for Billy's Rain
- 2004: Queen's Gold Medal for Poetry for Collected Poems
- 2007: T. S. Eliot Prize Shortlist for Dear Room
- 2007: Costa Book Award Shortlist for Dear Room

== Bibliography ==
=== Poetry ===
- Symptoms of Loss: Poems, Oxford University Press, 1965
- Sugar Daddy, Oxford University Press, 1970
- Some Sweet Day, Oxford University Press, 1975
- Love-Life (with drawings by Jessica Gwynne), André Deutsch, 1979 – winner of the Geoffrey Faber Memorial Prize
- Writing Home, Oxford University Press, 1985
- Selected Poems, Oxford University Press, 1989
- Self-Portrait with a Slide, Oxford University Press, 1990
- Dock Leaves, Faber and Faber, 1994
- Penguin Modern Poets 11 (Michael Donaghy, Andrew Motion, Hugo Williams), Penguin, 1997
- Billy's Rain, Faber and Faber, 1999
- Curtain Call: 101 Portraits in Verse (editor), Faber and Faber, 2001
- Collected Poems, Faber and Faber, 2002
- Dear Room, Faber and Faber, 2006
- West End Final, Faber and Faber, 2009
- I Knew the Bride, Faber and Faber, 2014
- Dialysis Days, Grey Suit Editions, 2018
- Lines Off, Faber and Faber, 2019
- Fast Music, Faber and Faber, 2024

=== Other ===
This list may also include some poetry books:

- All the Time in the World, Ross, 1966
- No Particular Place to Go, Cape, 1981
- Freelancing: Adventures of a Poet, Faber and Faber, 1995
- Some RB and Black Pop, Greville Press, 1998

=== Critical studies and reviews of Williams' work ===
- Kelly, Terry (June–July 2014). "Peter Pan meets Elvis". The London Magazine: 83–90. Reviews I Knew the Bride.

== See also ==
- 2014 in poetry
