= Ennia gens =

The gens Ennia was a family of Calabrian descent. It is known chiefly from a single individual, Quintus Ennius, a soldier, dramatist, and poet, whom the Romans came to regard as the father of their literature. Ennius was born at Rudiae, a village near Brundisium in Calabria, in 239 BC. He claimed descent from the ancient lords of Messapia. As a young man, he served as a soldier in the Roman army, rising to the rank of centurion. At the age of thirty-eight, he came to Rome in the train of Marcus Porcius Cato. Most of his works have been lost, or exist only in fragments, but he was greatly influential on later Roman writers, including Vergil.

== Members ==
- Quintus Ennius, the dramatist.
- Manius Ennius, Prefect of the Camp under Germanicus in AD 14, he suppressed a mutiny, executing two soldiers; but having exceeded his authority, he was put to flight and subsequently captured. He avoided death by arguing that his execution would constitute treason against both Germanicus and the emperor, and was able to lead the troops back to their winter quarters.
- Lucius Ennius, an eques in the time of Tiberius, who forbade his prosecution on a charge of treason, after he allegedly melted a silver statue of the emperor.
- Ennia Thrasylla, wife of Quintus Naevius Sutorius Macro, Praetorian Prefect under Tiberius and his successor, Caligula, with whom Ennia had an affair. After falling out of favour in AD 38, Macro and his wife were commanded to take their own lives.
- Lucius Ennius L. f. Ferox, a Roman soldier in the sixth Praetorian cohort during the time of Vespasian. He lived at Aquae Statiellae.

== See also ==
- List of Roman gentes
