= CCAG =

CCAG may refer to:

- Catalogus Codicum Astrologorum Graecorum, a collection of ancient Greek texts concerning astrology
- Collaborative Cloud Audit Group, an association coordinating pooled audits of Cloud Service Providers for the Financial Services Industry in the European Union
- Confederation Centre Art Gallery, an art museum in Charlottetown, Prince Edward Island, Canada
- Connecticut Citizen Action Group, a political advocacy group in the US state of Connecticut
