= Hermine Demoriane =

French singer

Hermine Demoriane is a French singer, writer, and former tightrope walker. Daughter of an engineer and a journalist, she married the British poet Hugo Williams in 1965, with whom she has a daughter, Murphy Williams, who is also a writer and journalist.

== Bohemian London ==
At the end of the 1960s she contributed to International Times, a hippie magazine, carrying out interviews with Jean-Luc Godard, Philippe Garrel, Len Lye and others.

In the early 1970s she spent time as a tightrope walker (see her book The Tightrope Walker), performing, for example, with COUM Transmissions (pre-Throbbing Gristle), and spending a season with Jérôme Savary's Grand Magic Circus in Paris in 1974, acting in Copi's play Goodbye Mister Freud. She played the character of Chaos, singing Piaf's "Non, je ne regrette rien", in Derek Jarman's Jubilee. She also took part in Alternative Miss World, organised by the artist Andrew Logan.

Hermine wrote three plays; Lou Andréas Salomé (starring Richard O'Brien and Jenny Runacre), He Who Is Your Lord Is Your Child Too (starring Anne Bean) and The Knives Beside the Plates (with the Neo-Naturist Cabaret), between 1978 and 1980. From October 1980 until 1981, she performed musical interludes at The Comic Strip, a pioneering café-theatre in Soho with comedians including Rik Mayall and Jennifer Saunders. In addition she performed and organised various evening shows of performance art.

She acted in John Maybury's Court of Miracles in 1982 and Hilda Was a Goodlooker by Anna Thew (London Film-Makers Co-Operative) in 1986.

== Chanteuse ==
In 1974, while employed as a tightrope walker by The Moodies, she sang for the first time in public, singing "I Won't Make It Without You" by Nick Lowe. With Moodier, successor group to The Moodies, she performed a version of Roy Orbison's "Blue Angel" produced by Max Paddison in the style of a Marlene Dietrich song.

In 1976 she played two concerts with the group The Subterraneans, composed of Nick Kent and The Damned without their singer Dave Vanian, and also recorded with both Nick Kent and Peter Perrett; the resulting single was being released. David Cunningham from The Flying Lizards noticed Hermine and helped recorded her single "Torture", originally planned for Virgin Records but which was eventually released on her own label Salomé Records, with a later remastered release on Human Records. She then released a second single with Human.

In April 1982 the Belgian record label Crammed Discs released an album containing six songs by Hermine, The World on My Plates, well known for the cover photograph by Richard Rayner-Canham where Hermine loads 7" singles into a dishwasher while wearing a cocktail dress. She toured in 1982 and 1983. The follow-up album Lonely at the Top was released in July 1984 on her own label (Salomé). Swiss session recordings for another album, along with a couple of re-recordings, were eventually released on Who'll Come Walking in 2008. Her two albums were both re-released in digitally remastered CD editions in 2006 by Les Temps Modernes (LTM).

Although having recorded very little since 1984, viewers of the TV series French & Saunders and Absolutely Fabulous have been able to see her as well as hear her French-accented voice in numerous musical pastiches (she sings a French version of the theme tune at the end of the episode "Paris" in 2001.)

She sang in May 2008 during a cycle rally that took place between Sacy-le-Petit and Verderonne in l'Oise, France, and on 11 and 12 June at Andrew Logan's Summer Sale at the GlassHouse in London.

== Lady of the Manor ==
Hermine is president of the non-profit organisation Ateliers d’artistes de Sacy, based in the Château de Sacy (a country house that she inherited in 1994 from her grandparents Hermine and Armand Dupuis, after having bought out the shares of her brothers and sisters, cousins and aunt), in Sacy-le-Petit, l'Oise. The organisation organises artists' residences by British and French artists and hosts exhibitions.

She is also secretary of the Blondin Memorial Trust, dedicated to the memory of the tightrope walker Charles Blondin.

== Discography ==
=== Original ===
- Torture/Veiled Women, 7", Salomé, re-released Human Records, Torture/Veiled Women/Born a woman/Foxes will, HUM 3, 1980
- TV Lovers/Valley of the Dolls, 7", Human Records, HUM 11, 1981
- The World on My Plates, 12", Crammed Discs, 1982
- Lonely at the Top, 12", Salomé, 1984
- Who'll Come Walking, CD and download, Salomé, 2008

=== Re-releases ===
- The World on My Plates, Remastered CD, LTM CD 2473, 2006
- Lonely at the Top, Remastered CD, LTM CD 2476, 2006

== Bibliography ==
- Lifestar, a Diary of Nine Months, Demoriane, Hermine, Alan Ross, 1969 / Coward-McCann, 1970. A diary of her pregnancy.
- The Tightrope Walker, Demoriane, Hermine, Secker & Warburg, 1989. ISBN 0-436-12682-6
