= The Grass Is Greener =

1960 film by Stanley Donen

- Theatrical release poster
- Directed by: Stanley Donen
- Screenplay by: Hugh Williams; Margaret Vyner
- Based on: The Grass Is Greener by: Hugh Williams; Margaret Vyner
- Produced by: Stanley Donen
- Starring: Cary Grant; Deborah Kerr; Robert Mitchum; Jean Simmons
- Cinematography: Christopher Challis
- Edited by: James Clark
- Music by: Noël Coward
- Production company: Grandon Productions
- Distributed by: Rank Film Distributors
- Release dates: 23 December 1960 (United States); 9 March 1961 (London)
- Running time: 104 minutes
- Country: United Kingdom
- Language: English
- Box office: $6 million (US)

The Grass Is Greener is a 1960 British romantic comedy film directed by Stanley Donen and starring Cary Grant, Deborah Kerr, Robert Mitchum and Jean Simmons. The screenplay was adapted by Hugh Williams and Margaret Vyner from the 1956 play they had written and found success with in London's West End.

== Plot ==
Victor and Hilary, the Earl and Countess of Rhyall, are dealing with the financial challenges of owning a large English country house and estate in 20th-century Britain when inheritance taxes have taken a toll on their financial situation. Like many other such estates, they have opened up their house to the public for guided tours at two shillings and sixpence per person, but are making a comfortable profit on it, growing mushrooms for market, and other minor estate-related enterprises.

Charles Delacro removes a large "Private" sign on the door and barges into the private quarters, finding the attractive young Hilary alone. At first annoyed, her behaviour is transformed when she learns that he is a millionaire American oil tycoon. Despite knowing that she is married, he expresses his attraction to her. Initially put off, Hilary is attracted by his brazen charm, and offers him a drink. After a stroll around the property together, Charles invites her to meet him for lunch in London, telling her he is staying at the Savoy Hotel, but she refuses. He persists, and they eventually kiss. When Victor suddenly enters the room, he quickly realises Charles's intentions and invites him to talk, treating him with exaggerated courtesy while Hilary becomes increasingly uncomfortable.

Over the next few days, Victor notices that Hilary is increasingly absent-minded. Hilary makes an appointment with her hairdresser in London for the next morning, explaining to Victor that she will have to stay overnight with her flamboyant friend, American heiress Hattie Durant. Rather than behave outwardly jealously, Victor offers her train times and affects not to know the real reason for her trip. Meanwhile, Charles tracks down Hilary's hairdresser and appointment, and is outside waiting when she leaves. Although Hilary tries to resist Charles, they go back to his hotel room and into the bedroom.

The next day, Hilary does not return home; instead, Hattie, an ex-girlfriend of Victor's who still carries a torch for him, arrives, anxious to tell him about his wife's affair. Despite admitting that he is devastated, Victor surmises that if he had stopped Hilary from going to London to see Charles, this would have damaged their relationship. However, when Hattie reveals that Charles has given Hilary an expensive mink coat, Victor becomes determined to reclaim his wife's affections. Victor phones Charles's hotel and invites him to visit over the weekend; he accepts, against Hilary's wishes, and even offers to give her a lift back from London.

When Hilary and Charles arrive the next day, Victor is determined to remain civilised at all times, and initially feigns ignorance of the affair and the mink coat. That evening, Victor confronts Charles about the tryst and challenges him to a duel for Hilary's love, which Charles accepts. With Sellers, the family butler, acting as a second, the two men fire once apiece in a long corridor in the mansion; Victor is wounded in the arm and Charles is unharmed. The women hear the gunshots and run downstairs.

While tending to Victor's wound, Hilary explains that she is torn between enjoying her liaison with Charles and regretting her actions. Victor declares that he will love Hilary despite her infidelity, and jokingly suggests that she go away with Charles for some time until he is "out of her system". As Charles appears, Hilary announces her decision to stay with Victor. Charles then summons Sellers, an expert shot, who admits to secretly shooting Victor at his behest, as Victor wanted to impress Hilary and expected that Charles would fire to miss.

When Hattie shows up wearing Hilary's new mink coat, Hilary demands that she take it off at gunpoint and gives it back to Charles, who in turn gives it to Hattie. The next day, Victor and Hilary say goodbye to Charles and Hattie, who drive off together.

== Cast ==
- Cary Grant as Victor, Earl of Rhyall
- Deborah Kerr as Hilary, Countess of Rhyall
- Robert Mitchum as Charles Delacro
- Jean Simmons as Hattie Durant
- Moray Watson as Trevor Sellers, the butler

== Production ==
Roy Ward Baker wanted to make the film at Rank Film Distributors and tried to obtain the rights.

Originally Cary Grant turned down the role of Victor. The role was subsequently offered to his friend Rex Harrison, who accepted. However, right before production began, Harrison's wife Kay Kendall fell gravely ill and he was forced to leave the production in order to tend to her. Grant, out of respect for cast and crew, and to keep the filming running according to schedule, decided then to finally take the part.

It was originally intended by director Stanley Donen that Grant would play the part of Delacro, the American tourist, while Harrison and Kendall were respectively cast as Victor Rhyall and Hattie. But Kendall died soon after completing an earlier Donen film, Once More, with Feeling!, and Harrison dropped out of the film because of this. Grant agreed to play Victor instead of Delacro, and both Rock Hudson and Charlton Heston were approached about playing the American character. Both refused, and Robert Mitchum was cast quite late in the proceedings, making no fuss at all about taking third-billing. Grant often claimed this had "saved the film" and praised his performance highly.

Most of the cast had worked together a number of times before. It was the third of four films that paired Deborah Kerr and Mitchum, the third time Jean Simmons had worked with Kerr and Mitchum, and Grant's third collaboration with Kerr, with whom he had worked on Dream Wife (1953) and An Affair to Remember (1957).

Moray Watson (Grant's butler) was the only member of the original stage cast to be retained for the film version.

Principal photography began on 4 April 1960 and wrapped in late July. Osterley Park in Isleworth, London, was used as the location for the stately home, while interiors were shot at Shepperton Studios using furniture and artifacts from several real-life stately homes. British interior decorator Felix Harbord served as the film's special consultant for settings.

== Reception ==
By January 1962, The Grass Is Greener earned $3 million in box office rentals from the United States and Canada.

Stanley Kauffmann of The New Republic wrote, "The film is an exceptionally deftly written piece of English 'triangle' fluff by Hugh and Margaret Williams, has good performances by Cary Grant and Deborah Kerr, and the presence of Robert Mitchum. Stanley Donen, the director, has coped reasonably well with essentially uncongenial film material. The dialogue and Miss Simmons are warmly recommended as warm mid-winter tonics." At the time of the film's release, Jean Simmons's performance as a madcap heiress earned some praise and a Laurel Award nomination.

On the review aggregator website Rotten Tomatoes, 90% of 10 critics' reviews are positive, with an average rating of 6.8/10.
