= The Blackness =

1961 British children's television serial

- Written by: Howard Williams; Barry Pevan
- Directed by: Jim Pople
- Country of origin: United Kingdom
- Original language: English
- No. of series: 1
- No. of episodes: 6 (all missing)

Production
- Running time: 25 minutes
- Production company: Associated-Rediffusion

Original release
- Network: ITV
- Release: 17 January – 21 February 1961

The Blackness is a British children's television serial made by Associated-Rediffusion and aired on ITV in 1961.

== Story ==
The Owens family, David, his wife Anne and their children Donald and Mary have recently inherited a remote island off the coast of Scotland. When the family arrives, they meet a hermit named McGhee and encounter "the blackness", a mysterious black mud that oozes everywhere. It is soon apparent that the Owens and McGhee are not the only people on the island.

== Cast ==
- Kevin Stoney as David Owens
- Rosalie Westwater as Anne Owens
- Diarmid Cammell as Donald Owens
- Shandra Walden as Mary Owens
- Ralph Nossek as McGhee
- John Sharplin as "Patch"/Commander Eager
- Harmish Roughead as Jim the Coastguard
- Barry Wilsher as Lt May, RN
- Dervis Ward as Submarine Commander
- John Murray Scott as Submarine Lieutenant

== Production notes ==
David and Anne Owens were played by real-life husband and wife, Kevin Stoney and Rosalie Westwater. This was John Sharplin's final role before passing away on the 27 March 1961.

== Episodes ==
Episode No.	Episode Title	Original Broadcast Date
1	"The Island	17 January 1961
2	"The Hermit"	24 January 1961
3	"Operation Diamond"	30 January 1961
4	"The Book"	6 February 1961
5	"The Tunnel"	13 February 1961
6	"The Capture"	21 February 1961

== Missing episodes ==
All 6 episodes are missing.

== External link ==
- The Blackness at IMDb
