= The Cavalier of the Streets =

1937 British film by Harold French

- Directed by: Harold French
- Written by: Ralph Neale; George Barraud
- Based on: short story The Cavalier of the Streets by Michael Arlen
- Produced by: Anthony Havelock-Allan
- Starring: Margaret Vyner; Patrick Barr; Carl Harbord
- Cinematography: Francis Carver
- Production company: British and Dominions Film Corporation
- Distributed by: Paramount British Pictures (UK)
- Release date: March 1937 (UK)
- Running time: 70 minutes
- Country: United Kingdom
- Language: English

The Cavalier of the Streets is a 1937 British comedy film directed by Harold French and starring Margaret Vyner, Patrick Barr and Carl Harbord. It was filmed at Pinewood Studios. An aristocratic lady is blackmailed.

== Plot ==
In this courtroom drama, barrister Sir John Avalon's wife Fay is accused of murdering her husband. Will her husband's partner, the Cavalier, who is blackmailing her, confess to killing him in time to save her life?

== Cast ==
- Patrick Barr as The Cavalier
- Margaret Vyner as Fay Avalon
- Carl Harbord as Prince Karanov
- James Craven as Sir John Avalon
- Peggy Chester as Daphne Brook
- Laura Smithson as Mrs Rudd
- Renee De Vaux as Lady Carnal
- Leo Genn as Attorney General

== Critical reception ==
TV Guide wrote, "More boring courtroom drama; English directors of the 1930s never seemed to tire of this stuff. Genn's brief appearance is the only enlivening factor here."
