= André Morell =

English actor (1909–1978)

- Born: Cecil André Mesritz; 20 August 1909; London, England
- Died: 28 November 1978 (aged 69); London, England
- Occupation: Actor
- Years active: 1934–1978
- Spouse: Joan Greenwood (m. 1960)
- Children: 1

Cecil André Mesritz (20 August 1909 – 28 November 1978), known professionally as André Morell, was an English actor. He appeared frequently in theatre, film and on television from the 1930s to the 1970s. His best known screen roles were as Professor Bernard Quatermass in the BBC Television serial Quatermass and the Pit (1958–59), and as Doctor Watson in the Hammer Film Productions version of The Hound of the Baskervilles (1959).

He also appeared in David Lean's film classics The Bridge on the River Kwai (1957) and Ben-Hur (1959), in several of Hammer's horror films throughout the 1960s and in the acclaimed ITV historical drama The Caesars (1968). His obituary in The Times newspaper described him as possessing a "commanding presence with a rich, responsive voice ... whether in the classical or modern theatre he was authoritative and dependable."

== Biography ==
=== Early life and career ===
Morell was born in London in 1909, the son of André and Rosa Mesritz. Prior to taking up acting professionally he trained as a motor engineer, while also participating in amateur theatrical productions. He turned professional in 1934, initially acting under the name André Mesritz; he anglicised his surname to Morell in 1936, and adopted the latter name legally by deed poll in 1938.

In 1938, he joined the Old Vic theatre company, and appeared in several of their high-profile productions both at their home theatre and on tour throughout Britain and across the rest of the world. He appeared in Hamlet as Horatio opposite Alec Guinness in the title role, and as Alonso in John Gielgud's production of The Tempest. He played Mercutio in a production of Romeo and Juliet mounted by the Old Vic company at Streatham in 1939, with Robert Donat as Romeo. This was Morell's favourite role from his career. His performance in the play was praised by The Times's critic as "a neat and carefully studied portrait; he is admirable in all his cynical and humorous passages", although the reviewer did add that "one could wish that he had left this manner for the speech about Queen Mab and addressed this, as a piece of direct poetry, directly to the audience."

Towards the end of the 1930s, he began appearing in films, making his debut on the big screen in 13 Men and a Gun (1938). He appeared frequently in several early drama productions on the BBC's fledgling television service, featuring in such roles as Mr Wickham in Pride and Prejudice (1938) and Le Bret in Cyrano de Bergerac (1938). The onset of the Second World War interrupted his acting career, and he joined the Royal Welch Fusiliers in 1940. He served with the regiment until 1946, by which time he had attained the rank of major.

=== Major film and television roles ===
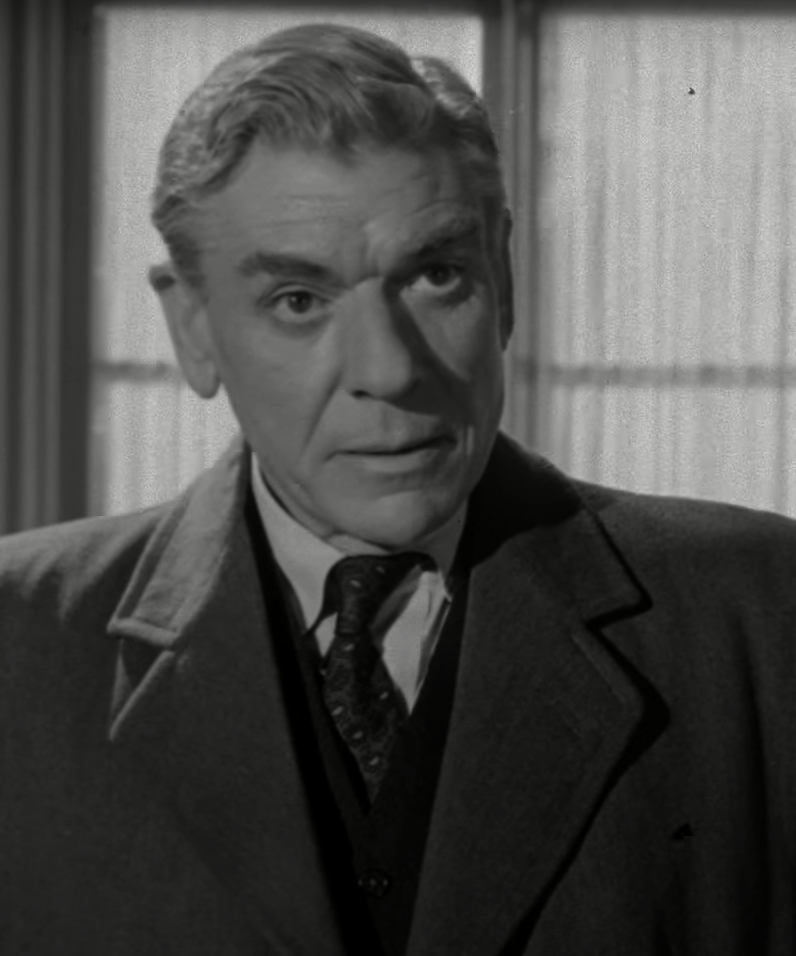
Morell in The Giant Behemoth

Morell returned to the theatre after the war, including another period at the Old Vic in the 1951–52 season. The New Statesman's critic T. C. Worsley wrote of his performance in a star-studded revival of King Lear that "Mr Morell's Kent is the best I remember since Sir Ralph Richardson's." Of his performance in the title role in Tyrone Guthrie's production of Timon of Athens, the Daily Mail wrote: "From his stage and screen performances we know him already as an eminently dependable actor, but last night he became a spectacular actor."

The same profile quoted Morell's catholic approach to stage assignments: "If a part is a good part and I feel I can enjoy playing it, it doesn't matter whether it's Shakespeare or modern farce … I'd hate to be bogged down in Shakespeare or classic theatre all my life. It's a good thing for an actor to do many different kinds of theatre, because it keeps his imagination stimulated."

However, he now increasingly began to win leading parts on television, and in 1953 was cast by the television director Rudolph Cartier in a play called It Is Midnight, Dr Schweitzer. Cartier was impressed with Morell's performance in this play, and offered him the leading role in a science-fiction serial he was preparing with the writer Nigel Kneale, entitled The Quatermass Experiment. Morell considered the not-yet-completed script, but decided to decline the offer; the part went instead to his co-star from It Is Midnight, Dr Schweitzer, Reginald Tate.

He did take one of the leading parts in another Cartier and Kneale production the following year, when he played O'Brien in their version of George Orwell's novel Nineteen Eighty-Four, opposite Peter Cushing as Winston Smith. This was a successful and controversial production which provoked much comment and debate; Morell's part in it has been praised for his "coolly menacing performance [that] is at least equal to Cushing's."

This successful collaboration with Cartier and Kneale resulted, four years later, in him once again being offered the role of Professor Bernard Quatermass for the pair's third serial in the series, Quatermass and the Pit, although on this occasion another actor – Alec Clunes – had already turned them down. This time Morell accepted the part, and is regarded by several critics as having provided the definitive interpretation of the character. Morell personally found that in later years it was the role for which he was most often remembered by members of the public.

As well as these and other television appearances, Morell gained several notable film roles towards the end of the 1950s. He appeared in two films which won the Academy Award for Best Picture; The Bridge on the River Kwai (1957), as Colonel Green, and Ben-Hur (1959) as Sextus.

With Cushing as Sherlock Holmes, he played Arthur Conan Doyle's character Doctor John H. Watson, in Hammer Film Productions' version of The Hound of the Baskervilles (also 1959). Morell was particularly keen that his portrayal of Watson should be closer to that originally depicted in Conan Doyle's stories, and away from the bumbling stereotype established by Nigel Bruce's interpretation of the role. An earlier Hammer film in which Morell appeared was The Camp on Blood Island (1957).

In 1960, Morell appeared as Judge Brack in a production of Henrik Ibsen's play Hedda Gabler at the Oxford Playhouse. Starring opposite him in the title role was the film actress Joan Greenwood. They fell in love and flew in secret to Jamaica, where they were married, remaining together until his death.

=== Later career ===
Morell continued to appear in Hammer's horror films in the ensuing decade. He had parts in the Shadow of the Cat (1960), She (1964, again with Peter Cushing) and its sequel The Vengeance of She (1967), the lead in The Plague of the Zombies (1965), and The Mummy's Shroud (1966). He also starred with Cushing in Hammer's Cash on Demand, playing the same role he had played opposite Richard Vernon in the original TV play, The Gold Inside, but turned down the opportunity of reprising the title role in Hammer's feature film adaptation of Quatermass and the Pit (1967).

Morell continued to act successfully on television throughout the decade, with guest roles in episodes of series such as The Avengers (1963 and 1965), Danger Man (1965), Doctor Who (The Massacre of St Bartholomew's Eve 1966), The Saint (1965) and in The Caesars (1968) in a prominent role as the Roman emperor Tiberius.

In 1969, he became the vice president of Equity, the trade union for British actors and performers. He then served as president of the organisation for a year from 1973–74. During this time he was involved in a dispute in which Equity threatened to expel Laurence Olivier as a member due to comments he made in a newspaper feature about the possibility of forming a breakaway union. The union also suffered from financial problems, and Morell continued to warn against destructive divisions amongst the members when he stepped down as president.

Despite his involvement in union business he continued to be a busy working actor. He appeared in Stanley Kubrick's Barry Lyndon (1975) as a nobleman friend of the title character. His last television work was an episode of the ITV series The Professionals in 1978, the year of his death. The animated film version of The Lord of the Rings, in which he voiced the character of Elrond, was released the same year, but his final film work was not seen until the year after his death. This was as the judge in The First Great Train Robbery.

== Personal life ==
Morell married actress Joan Greenwood in 1960. The couple had a son, Jason Morell, who also became an actor, appearing in films such as Mrs Brown (1997, as Lord Stanley) and Wilde (also 1997, as Ernest Dowson).

== Death ==
Morell, who smoked up to 60 cigarettes a day until he gave up in 1976, died from lung cancer in London on 28 November 1978, at the age of 69.

== Filmography ==
- 13 Men and a Gun (1938) - Kroty
- Many Tanks Mr. Atkins (1938) - Hart
- Ten Days in Paris (1940) - Victor
- Three Silent Men (1940) - Charles Klein
- Unpublished Story (1942) - Marchand
- Against the Wind (1948) - Abbot (uncredited)
- That Dangerous Age (1949) - Doctor McCatcheon
- No Place for Jennifer (1950) - William's Counsel
- Madeleine (1950) - Dean of Falcuty
- Stage Fright (1950) - Inspector Byard
- So Long at the Fair (1950) - Doctor Hart
- Trio (1950) - Dr. Lennox (in segment Sanatorium)
- Seven Days to Noon (1950) - Superintendent Folland
- The Clouded Yellow (1950) - Secret Service Chief Chubb
- Flesh & Blood (1951) - Dr. Marshall
- High Treason (1951) - Supt. Folland
- The Tall Headlines (1952) - George Rackham
- Stolen Face (1952) - David
- His Majesty O'Keefe (1954) - Alfred Tetins
- The Golden Link (1954) - Supt. Blake
- The Black Knight (1954) - Sir Ontzlake
- Three Cases of Murder (1955) - Dr. Audlin ("Lord Mountdrago" segment)
- Summertime (1955) - Englishman (uncredited)
- The Secret (1955) - Chief Inspector Blake
- They Can't Hang Me (1955) - Robert Isaac Pitt
- The Man Who Never Was (1956) - Sir Bernard Spilsbury
- The Black Tent (1956) - Sheik Salem ben Yussef
- The Baby and the Battleship (1956) - Marshal
- Zarak (1956) - Maj. Atherton
- Interpol (1957) - Commissioner Breckner
- The Bridge on the River Kwai (1957) - Colonel Green
- Diamond Safari (1958) - Williamson
- Paris Holiday (1958) - American Ambassador
- The Camp on Blood Island (1958) - Col. Lambert
- The Giant Behemoth (1959) - Prof. James Bickford
- The Hound of the Baskervilles (1959) - Doctor Watson
- Ben-Hur (1959) - Sextus
- Cone of Silence (1960) - Capt. Edward Manningham
- The Shadow of the Cat (1961) - Walter Venable
- Cash on Demand (1961) - Colonel Gore Hepburn
- The Human Jungle
- Woman of Straw (1964) - Judge (uncredited)
- The Moon-Spinners (1964) - Yacht Captain
- She (1965) - Haumeid
- The Plague of the Zombies (1966) - Sir James Forbes
- Judith (1966) - Haim
- The Wrong Box (1966) - Club Butler (uncredited)
- The Mummy's Shroud (1967) - Sir Basil Walden
- Dark of the Sun (1968) - Bussier
- The Vengeance of She (1968) - Kassim
- Julius Caesar (1970) - Cicero
- 10 Rillington Place (1971) - Old Bailey: Judge Lewis
- Pope Joan (1972) - Emperor Louis
- Barry Lyndon (1975) - Lord Gustavus Adolphus Wendover
- The Slipper and the Rose (1976) - Bride's Father
- The Message (1976) - Abu-Talib
- The Lord of the Rings (1978) - Lord Elrond (voice)
- The First Great Train Robbery (1979) - Judge (final film role)
