= 13 Men and a Gun =

1938 film

- Directed by: Mario Zampi
- Written by: Kathleen Connors; Basil Dillon; Giovacchino Forzano
- Produced by: Mario Zampi
- Starring: Arthur Wontner; Clifford Evans; Allan Jeayes
- Cinematography: Mario Albertelli
- Music by: Ronald Binge
- Production company: Two Cities Films
- Distributed by: British Independent Exhibitors' Distributors
- Release date: June 1938
- Running time: 64 minutes
- Countries: United Kingdom; Italy
- Language: English

13 Men and a Gun is a 1938 British-Italian war film directed by Mario Zampi and starring Arthur Wontner, Clifford Evans and Howard Marion-Crawford. It was written by Kathleen Connors, Basil Dillon and Giovacchino Forzano, and is an English-language version of the Italian film Tredici uomini e un cannone (1936).

== Premise ==
During the First World War, Russian forces attempt to take out an Austrian artillery position.

== Cast ==
- Arthur Wontner as Captain
- Clifford Evans as Jorg
- Howard Marion-Crawford as Kramer
- Allan Jeayes as General Vloty
- Gibb McLaughlin as Colonel Vlatin
- Wally Patch as Hans
- Scott Harold as Ludwig
- Donald Gray as Johann
- Bernard Miles as Schultz
- André Morell as Kroty
- John Kevan as Peder

== Reception ==
The Monthly Film Bulletin wrote: "It is a pity that such promising and unusual material has not been turned to better account. The direction is uneven. There is some very fine acting and characterisation among the personnel of the gun team and here the direction shows a capacity above the ordinary. In the general handling of the plot and the transition from success and camaraderie to suspicion and the probability of sudden death before the firing squad, the quality of the direction is not maintained."

Kine Weekly wrote: "The theme, although based on fact, has much of the compelling mysticism of legend, but there are moments when its dramatic authenticity is lessened by indecisive direction. It takes too long to come to its point, and follows up this error with lack of culminating clarity. It is, however, an impressive experiment in the unusual, and is of sufficient psycholocgical interest to furnish dramatic refreshment for the more serious-minded. ... A play without a woman, this film is, at times, reminiscent of Journey's End but its keen psychological aspect is not backed up by concise treatment ."
