= Ennia Thrasylla =

1st-century AD Roman noblewoman

Ennia Thrasylla (Note: She has also been known as Ennia Naeva or Ennia Naevia, Ennia the wife of Macro, Ennia and Eunia) (about 15 – 38, Ennia in Greek Greek: Ἐννία, Ennia Thrasylla in Greek Greek: Ἐννία Θράσυλλα) was a Roman noblewoman who lived in the 1st century AD in the Roman Empire.

== Family background ==
Ennia was of Latin, Greek, Armenian and Median descent. She was the daughter and known child of Lucius Ennius from his unnamed wife, and perhaps had a brother called Lucius Ennius who was the father of Lucius Ennius Ferox, a Roman soldier who served during the reign of the Roman emperor Vespasian from 69 until 79.

Her father, Lucius Ennius, was a Latin Roman eques, who originally may have come from the Roman province of Creta et Cyrenaica, as he was a contemporary to the reign of the Roman emperor Tiberius who ruled from 14 until 37. Lucius Ennius was a relative of Quintus Ennius, a Poet who lived during the Roman Republic, and Manius Ennius, a Roman Soldier who served with Germanicus in 14 on the Rhine River.

The unnamed wife of Ennius who was the mother of Ennia, was a Roman noblewoman from Alexandria, in the Roman Province of Egypt who was of Greek, Armenian and Median descent. She was the daughter and oldest child, born to Thrasyllus of Mendes and his wife, Aka II of Commagene. Thrasyllus was an Egyptian Greek Grammarian and Literary Commentator who served as the astrologer and became the personal friend of the Roman emperor Tiberius, while Aka II was a Princess of Armenian, Greek and Median descent from the Kingdom of Commagene. Her maternal uncle was Tiberius Claudius Balbilus, hence was a paternal cousin to Claudia Capitolina who would later marry into the Kingdom of Commagene.

As Ennia by birth, her nomen is Ennius while her cognomen Thrasylla is the female name of the ancient Greek name Thrasyllus. She inherited the cognomen Thrasylla from her maternal grandfather, as evidently she is a granddaughter of Thrasyllus. Little is known of her early life and life prior to marriage.

== Marriage and imperial connections ==
By 31, Ennia married the Roman Vigiles Prefect Quintus Naevius Cordus Sutorius Macro, also known as Naevius Sutorius Macro or simply Macro. After the downfall and death of the Praetorian Prefect Lucius Aelius Sejanus in Rome in 31, Macro was appointed by Tiberius to replace Sejanus. Macro, now being the head Praetorian prefect of the Praetorian Guard in Rome, had become very ambitious in his role. Through his position, Ennia and Macro began to have considerable influence.

As Ennia's husband being Prefect wielded considerable influence, this led to Ennia and Macro befriending and coming into favor with Tiberius' great-nephew and heir, Caligula. In 34, Caligula lost his first wife Junia Claudilla during childbirth, and at some time after that he began a relationship with Ennia. The precise circumstances of Ennia and Caligula's affair are obscure. Ennia's affair with Caligula occurred on the island of Capri, where her grandfather presided with Tiberius. Caligula developed a close sexual relationship with Ennia in which she became one of Caligula's mistresses.

Suetonius states that Caligula seduced Ennia; however, Tacitus states that Macro induced Ennia to pretend to love Caligula. Ennia and Macro worked together as a team to assure their future position and sources vary as to Macro's role in and the possible approval of Ennia having an affair with Caligula to ensure that Macro remained in favor with him.

After Ennia and Caligula's affair in Capri in 34, he swore to marry Ennia if he became Emperor, putting his oath in writing. Caligula may have done this to secure the support of Macro and to expand the sphere of influence for Macro and Ennia. Caligula's interaction between Ennia and Macro benefited him immensely by helping him succeed Tiberius as Roman emperor, when the latter died in early 37.

Caligula ruled as Roman emperor from 37 until 41. Ennia and Macro proved very instrumental in the early days of Caligula's reign. For his support of Caligula, Macro was appointed by Caligula as the Prefect of Egypt. In 38, when Ennia and Macro with their children were leaving the Italian mainland to head to Egypt for Macro to serve his prefectship, they fell out of favor with Caligula. Before their departure, they were given an imperial order to kill themselves. Macro was able to leave enough money to provide an amphitheatre for his home town of Alba Fucens.

== In popular culture ==
- 1968 - Wanda Ventham in the British TV series The Caesars.
- 1979 – Adriana Asti in the theatrical film Caligula.

== Sources ==
- Tacitus, The Annals of Imperial Rome
- P. Robinson Coleman-Norton & F. Card Bourne, Ancient Roman Statutes, The Lawbook Exchange Limited, 1961
- B. Levick, Tiberius: The Politician, Routledge, 1999
- A.A. Barrett, Caligula: The Corruption of Power (Google eBook), Routledge, 2002
- M. Zimmerman, G. Schmeling, H. Hofmann, S. Harrison & C. Panayotakis (eds.), Ancient Narrative, Barkhuis, 2002
- R. Beck, Beck on Mithraism: Collected Works With New Essays, Ashgate Publishing Limited, 2004
- J.H. Holden, A History of Horoscopic Astrology, American Federation of Astrology, 2006
- G.W. Adams, The Roman Emperor: Gaius 'Caligula' and His Hellenistic Aspirations, Universal-Publishers, 2007
- M. Lightman & B. Lightman, A to Z of Ancient Greek and Roman Women, Infobase Publishing, 2008
- M. Bunson, Encyclopedia of the Roman Empire, Infobase Publishing, 2009
- Genealogy of daughter of Tiberius Claudius Thrasyllus & Aka II of Commagene at rootsweb
- Royal genealogy of Aka II of Commagene at rootsweb
