= Flesh and Blood (1951 film) =

- Directed by: Anthony Kimmins
- Written by: Anatole de Grunwald
- Based on: play A Sleeping Clergyman by James Bridie
- Produced by: Anatole de Grunwald
- Starring: Richard Todd; Glynis Johns; Joan Greenwood
- Cinematography: Otto Heller
- Edited by: Gerald Turney-Smith
- Music by: Charles Williams
- Production company: London Films
- Distributed by: British Lion Films (U.K.)
- Release date: 16 April 1951
- Running time: 102 minutes
- Country: United Kingdom
- Language: English
- Box office: £119,973 (UK)

Flesh and Blood is a 1951 British drama film directed by Anthony Kimmins and starring with Richard Todd (in two roles), Glynis Johns and Joan Greenwood. It was written by Anatole de Grunwald based upon the 1933 play A Sleeping Clergyman by James Bridie.

Richard Todd said the film "received reasonable reviews and [did] moderate business".

== Plot ==
Beginning with Dr Marshall, a believer in genius being hereditary, bringing up the illegitimate child of his late friend Charles Cameron, the film tells the story of three generations of the Scottish Cameron family, with its conflicts and romances.

== Cast ==
- Richard Todd as Charles Cameron Sutherland
- Glynis Johns as Katherine
- Joan Greenwood as Wilhelmina
- André Morell as Dr Marshall
- Ursula Howells as Harriet
- Freda Jackson as Mrs Hannah
- George Cole as John Hannah
- James Hayter as Sir Douglas Manley
- Ronald Howard as Purley
- Muriel Aked as Mrs Walker
- Michael Hordern as Webster
- Helen Christie as Minnie Arnott
- Walter Fitzgerald as Dr Cooper
- Lilly Kann as Sister Maria
- Patrick Macnee as Sutherland
- Fred Johnson as Donovan
- Molly Weir as Margaret
- Hugh Dempster as Cranley
- Alexander Gauge as Coutts
- Betty Paul as Moira
- Peter Macdonell as Jordan
- Hector MacGregor as Major
- John Vere as Leighton
- Enzo Coticchia as Forzin
- Archie Duncan as Sergeant
- Francis De Wolff as Ambassador
- Kenneth Downey as club porter
- Sergio Mari as Mario
- David Cameron as McDermott
- Bill Logan as McGregor
- Anna Canitano as nurse
- John Kelly as Wilkinson
- Joan Heal as a girl in the night club
- Nina Parry as child Wilhelmina
- Billy Newsbury as child John Hannah
- Sally Owen as the doll
- William Chappell as the dancer
- Jock Mckay as Baker

== Production ==
It was shot at Teddington Studios.

== Reception ==
The Monthly Film Bulletin wrote: "Flesh and Blood is adapted from James Bridie's play The Sleeping Clergyman. The play was made up, in effect, of three self-contained episodes, each contributing some thing to the theme: the effect of hereditary qualities. Anatole de Grunwald, who made the adaptation, has scarcely attempted to supply that continuity which might overcome the play's episodic structure and make plausible the three melodramas in one. The first two episodes, with their very high death-rate, are dealt with in a somewhat perfunctory manner. Characters are killed off before they have time to develop, theatrically melodramatic scenes follow one another rapidly. ... The third generation is dealt with more fully, but even hereall subtlety in narration and the development of character is sacrificed to the desire to cram in a variety of scenes and happenings."

Variety wrote: "In adapting this James Bridie play to the screen much elaboration has produced enough plot to make three separate stories, a lot of which is wholly incredible, with no clarification of some salient points. It has a strong cast, providing individual dramatic opportunities for most characters and is soundly directed by Anthony Kimmins. Otto Heller's camera work is exceptionally good. On its star value alone, coupled with the author's rep, it should do well locally, but its chances in the U.S. do not appear to lie In the same direction. Its prospects would be enhanced by judicious cutting."

Picturegoer wrote: "Very nearly first class. That's the summing up on this absorbing story of the quirks of heredity, which gives Richard Todd a double chance – he plays father and son in a three generation work-out of the theory that one way or another, genius will out. The picture falls just short of the target because it is a little discursive, and because the director is inclined to linger too long over scenes which, though obviously first-rate, temporarily upset the flow of the story. Nevertheless, vision, thought and sensitivity have gone to the making of this film."

Picture Show wrote: "Richard Todd gives a convincing portrayal in the dual role of the dying genius and his grandson, and is well supported by Andre Morell. It is necessarily episodic, but this by no means detracts from its absorbing drama."

In British Sound Films: The Studio Years 1928–1959 David Quinlan rated the film as "average", writing: "Complex, rambling saga."
