= Margaret Vyner =

Australian-born model and actress (1914–1993)

- Born: Margaret Leila Vyner; 3 December 1914; Armidale, New South Wales, Australia
- Died: 30 October 1993 (aged 78); Reading, England
- Years active: 1930–1969
- Spouse(s): Hugh Williams; 1940–1969 (his death);1d, 2s Jack Clayton; 1972

Margaret Leila Vyner, also known by her married name Margaret Williams (3 December 1914 in Armidale, New South Wales – 30 October 1993 in Reading, England) was an Australian-born model and actress who appeared in British films. She collaborated with husband Hugh Williams on a number of successful theatre projects in the 1950s and 1960s.

== Modelling and acting career ==
Vyner was the daughter of New South Wales pastoralist Robert Vyner. She attended Ascham School and later, Miss Jean Cheriton's Doone finishing school at Edgecliff, to whom, she said, she owed a great deal. Her first employment as a junior salesgirl at department store David Jones in Sydney was, in her own words, "a dismal and unqualified failure."

In the early 1930s she won a role in the stage production of Florodora. Other successful work on stage in Australia followed, mostly in supporting roles, including Blue Roses and The Merry Widow. According to granddaughter Kate Dunn, she sailed for England in 1933, but left the ship at Naples. Making her way overland to Paris, she was hired by French couturier, Jean Patou, first as a general "dog's body", later working her way up to be a leading mannequin. By 1935 she was well established and widely admired as a successful model. About this time, Cole Porter added the following lines to his song "You're the Top" from the musical Anything Goes: "You're the top, You're an ocean liner, You're the top, You're Margaret Vyner." She also worked for fashion designer Norman Hartnell in London and toured the United States and Canada modelling his collection. She returned to Australia for Christmas 1935, and won a supporting role in Miles Mander's film The Flying Doctor, made in early 1936.

== Marriage and collaboration with Hugh Williams ==
Kate Dunn claims that Vyner first saw future husband, British actor and playwright Hugh Williams on stage when he toured Australia in the late 1920s. They met on board ship travelling to the United States in late 1937 and married on 21 June 1940. Both Williams and Vyner made films in the late 1930s; however, the situation changed on the outbreak of war, when Williams, then aged 35, felt duty bound to join the British Army. During the war, Vyner made considerable effort to maintain a good relationship with Williams' first wife, Gwynne Whitby and share in the upbringing of their two daughters, Loo and Prue. With Williams, she had two sons and a daughter: Hugh, Simon and Polly.

After the war, Williams struggled to re-establish himself as an actor and the family faced financial difficulties. In the early 1950s, Williams and Vyner began to collaborate on a number of plays. These were successful and included Plaintiff in a Pretty Hat, The Grass is Greener and Charlie Girl. They later collaborated on the screenplay for the film adaptation of The Grass is Greener. Son Hugo Williams said: "Both my parents placed huge importance on appearance and being amusing. If you opened your mouth you'd better have something amusing to say. It didn't matter whether it was true or not, so long as it was lightly amusing."

Following Hugh Williams' death from cancer in December 1969, Vyner remarried. She died in 1993.

== Filmography ==
- The Flying Doctor (1936)
- Sensation (1936)
- Midnight Menace (1937)
- The Cavalier of the Streets (1937)
- Incident in Shanghai (1938)
- Sailing Along (1938)
- Climbing High (1938)
- Dangerous Comment (1940, short)
- This Man Is Dangerous (1941)
- The Young Mr. Pitt (1942)
- Picture People (1943, documentary)
- The Lamp Still Burns (1943)
- Mr. Emmanuel (1944)
- Give Me the Stars (1945)
- Twilight Hour (1945)
- Encore (1951)
- Something Money Can't Buy (1952)
