= Catherine Lacey =

English actress (1904–1979)

- Lacey in The Lady Vanishes (1938)
- Born: 6 May 1904; London, England
- Died: 23 September 1979 (aged 75); London, England
- Occupation: Actress
- Years active: 1938–1973
- Spouse(s): Roy Emerton; Geoffrey Clark

Catherine Lacey (6 May 1904 – 23 September 1979) was an English actress of stage and screen.

== Stage ==
Lacey made her stage debut, performing with Mrs Patrick Campbell, in The Thirteenth Chair at the West Pier Brighton on 13 April 1925. Her first appearance in the West End was in July 1926 in Cock o' the Roost at the Garrick Theatre.

Her other West End credits included The Beetle (Strand Theatre 1928), The Venetian (Little Theatre 1931; her Broadway debut, at the Masque Theatre, followed in the same play the same year), The Green Bay Tree (St Martin's Theatre 1933), After the Dance (St James' Theatre 1939), She Follows Me About (Garrick Theatre 1943), The Late Edwina Black (Ambassadors Theatre 1949), Tiger at the Gates (Apollo Theatre 1955; she appeared at the Plymouth Theatre on Broadway in the same play later the same year), The Tiger and the Horse (Queen's Theatre 1960) and I Never Sang for My Father (Duke of York's Theatre 1970).

Having acted at Stratford and the Old Vic in 1935/36, she returned to both companies in later years: to the Old Vic in 1951 (Clytemnestra in Electra) and 1962 (Aase in Peer Gynt, Emilia in Othello), and to the Royal Shakespeare Company in 1967, playing Volumnia in Coriolanus and the Countess of Rousillon in All's Well That Ends Well.

== Screen ==
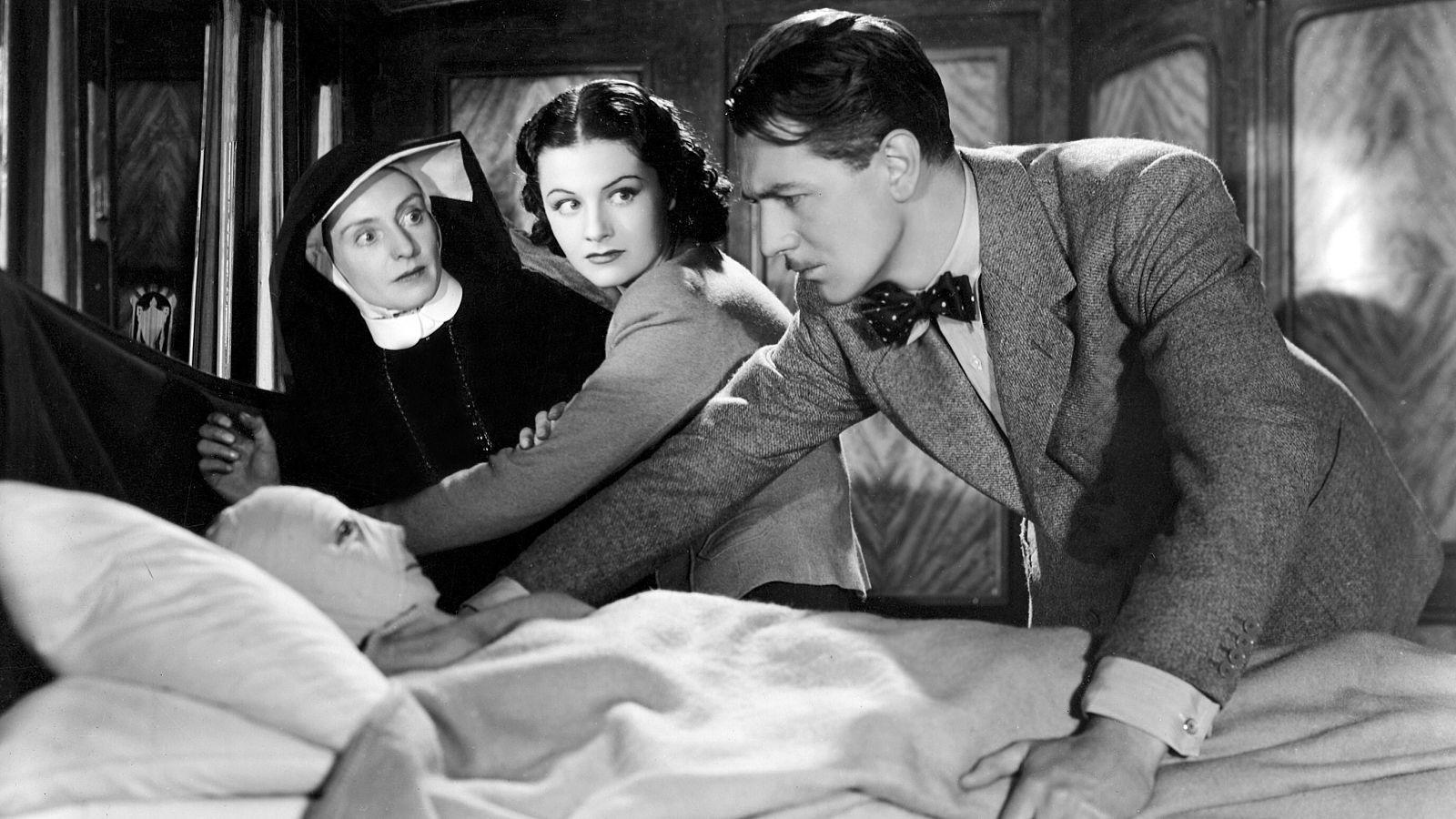
Catherine Lacey, Margaret Lockwood and Michael Redgrave in Alfred Hitchcock's The Lady Vanishes (1938)

She made her film debut in 1938 as the secretive nun who wears high heels in Alfred Hitchcock's The Lady Vanishes, in which she was credited as Catherine Lacy. Her film credits include I Know Where I'm Going! (1945), The October Man (1947), Whisky Galore! (1949), The Servant (1963) and The Fighting Prince of Donegal (1966), in which she played Queen Elizabeth I. In 1966/67 she played a malevolent fortune-teller in The Mummy's Shroud and Boris Karloff's insane wife in Michael Reeves' The Sorcerers. For the latter, she won a 'Silver Asteroid' award as Best Actress at the Trieste Science Fiction Film Festival in 1968.

Eight years earlier, she received the Guild of TV Producers and Directors award as Actress of the Year. Her television debut in 1938 was in a BBC production of The Duchess of Malfi. Her last appearance in 1973 was in the Play for Today installment Mrs Palfrey at the Claremont.

== Personal life ==
She was married to the British actors Roy Emerton and Geoffrey Clark.

== Partial filmography ==
- The Lady Vanishes (1938) – The Nun
- Poison Pen (1939) – Connie Fateley
- The House of the Arrow (1940) – Francine Rollard
- Cottage to Let (1941) – Mrs. Stokes
- I Know Where I'm Going! (1945) – Mrs. Robinson
- Pink String and Sealing Wax (1945) – Miss Porter
- Carnival (1946) – Florrie Raeburn
- The October Man (1947) – Miss Selby
- The White Unicorn (1947) – Miss Cater
- When the Bough Breaks (1947) – Almoner
- Whisky Galore! (1949) – Mrs. Waggett
- Another Sky (1954) – Selena Prouse
- The Man in the Sky (1957) – Mary's Mother
- Innocent Sinners (1958) – Angela Chesney
- The Solitary Child (1958) – Mrs. Evans
- Rockets Galore! (1958) – Mrs. Waggett
- Crack in the Mirror (1960) – Mother Superior
- The Shadow of the Cat (1961) – Ella Venable
- The Servant (1963) – Lady Mounset
- The Fighting Prince of Donegal (1966) – (uncredited)
- The Mummy's Shroud (1967) – Haiti
- The Sorcerers (1967) – Estelle / Estelle Monserrat
- Journey to Midnight (1968) – Miss Sarah Prinn (episode 'The Indian Spirit Guide')
- The Private Life of Sherlock Holmes (1970) – Woman in Wheelchair
