= Ralph Nossek =

British actor (1923–2011)

Ralph Nossek (25 July 1923 – 5 December 2011) was a British actor of stage, television and screen. From 1953 until his last years he was a well known figure in British live theatre, adapted well to the new medium of television and over the years played in a considerable number of films. He was versatile, competent and confident in his different roles and in particular made a noticeable contribution to the emergence of British television drama.

== Early years ==
In his late teens, Nossek was called up for military service in World War II and as the war reached its end, in 1945 he found himself on an army base in Colombo, Sri Lanka. A determining moment for the rest of his life was the day his attempt to gain admittance to the base amateur theatre company was rebuffed on the grounds that this was reserved to officers. Nossek and friend Peter Coxhead set up a rival organization and on Friday, 13 April 1945 The Theatre Club was opened. The first production was of Sutton Vane's Outward Bound. It was well received, as were other plays, revues, concerts and musical evenings. There was a sufficient air of success to ensure that a number of these early members opted to continue working together when the war ended and they were demobbed and returned to England. There Nossek and Coxhead founded in the North London suburb of Crouch End the Mountview Theatre Club, an amateur repertory company, whose theatre opened officially in November 1947 with a production of Oscar Wilde's The Importance of Being Earnest. This was followed by a regular play each month until 1949, after which Coxhead bought the building outright from the leaseholders. Thereafter, for the next 25 years one new production after another was staged every two to three weeks. The club was later to become very successful as the Mountview Academy of Theatre Arts, now located in custom-built premises in the South London suburb of Peckham. For his part, Nossek went on in 1955 to pursue an independent professional acting career that endured for 56 years.

== Career ==
While live engagements for the stage and film appearances were not lacking in Nossek’s professional career, the sheer bulk and regularity of his appearances in British television fiction is striking. While it may be an exaggeration to say so, there seems hardly to be a British television series over half a century in which he did not find a role in at least one or other episode. At very least it could be said that when he appeared on the TV screen it was hardly a surprise to a British viewer. Many of the TV and film roles he played tended to portray sinister or shady characters, but over the years of his career it is also remarkable how many times he played policeman, judges, ministers of state and even clergymen. Furthermore, especially in later years, he also handled convincingly roles as the Nazi Grand Admiral Karl Dönitz and the Romanian dictator Nicolae Ceausescu.

=== Live Theatre ===
Ralph Nossek played in a wide variety of theatrical productions. One of his early roles came in 1953 when he acted in T. S. Eliot's play, Murder in the Cathedral, at the Library Theatre in Manchester, England, under the direction of Stuart Latham, with a cast that included John Brooking, John Saunders, Michael Robbins, Diane Cilento, Peter Lambert, Frederick Bartman, Alec Gunn and Colin Trevor.

He was active on the stage at least as late as 2003, when he acted in Adrian Noble's production of Oscar Wilde's play, A Woman of No Importance at London's Theatre Royal Haymarket, where the cast included Rupert Graves, Prunella Scales and Joanne Pearce.

=== Television ===
From an early date Nossek appeared in a wide range of TV series, including (in approximately chronological order) the following:

The Children of the New Forest, As I Was Saying, Overseas Press Club - Exclusive!, The Black Arrow, Television Playwright, Sunday Night Theatre, Solo for Canary, McFarlane’s Way, Hancock's Half Hour, The Blackness, Boyd Q.C., Citizen James, Maigret, The Avengers, The Sword in the Web, Thirty Minute Theatre, The New Avengers, A Tale of Two Cities, Undermind, Steptoe and Son, Object Z, Mysteries and Miracles, Object Z Returns, No Hiding Place, King of the River, Blackmail, Emergency Ward 10, The Newcomers, Virgin of the Secret Service, Detective, The Power Game, The Flaxton Boys, Macbeth, Fraud Squad, Callan, Poldark (1975), Bill Brand, Little Lord Fauntleroy, ITV Playhouse, Crown Court, Whodunnit?, The Sweeney, Telford’s Change, Prince Regent, We, the Accused, Flickers, The Borgias (1981), Great Expectations (1981), Brideshead Revisited, Theatre Box, Jackanory Playhouse, Jemima Shore Investigates, The Old Men at the Zoo, Cockles, Chance in a Million, Them and Us, Screen Two, Boon, Mr Pye, Worlds Beyond, Drummonds, Bergerac, Behaving Badly, Screenplay, Agatha Christie's Poirot, Parnell and the Englishwoman, The Strauss Dynasty, T-Bag, That's Love, Inspector Morse, Kinsey, A Touch of Frost, The Blackheath Poisonings, Maigret (1992), The House of Eliott, Under the Hammer, Dandelion Dead, Peak Practice, Chiller, Pie in the Sky, The Life and Crimes of William Palmer, The Bill, Urban Gothic, Micawber, Waking the Dead, and 20 Things to Do Before You're 30.

=== Films ===
Nossek’s film engagements began already before he parted company with the Mountview Theatre Club in 1955, since in 1954 he took the part of 'The Leading Man' in a BBC TV film version of Luigi Pirandello's 1921 play Six Characters in Search of an Author.

One of his last film roles (already in his mid-eighties) was as Barnaby in the 2009 romantic comedy film My Life in Ruins (UK title: Driving Aphrodite), starring Richard Dreyfuss.

== Award ==
Nossek received the 1987 Critics Circle Theatre Award for Best Supporting Actor for his performance in a production of Stephen Bill's play, Curtains, directed by Stuart Burge at the Hampstead Theatre in the London Borough of Camden, with a cast that included Sheila Ballantine and Alfred Lynch. The set was designed by Tim Reed, and the lighting design was by Nick Chelton.

== Filmography ==
Year	Title	Role	Notes
1956	Zarak	Native Soldier	Uncredited
1958	Orders to Kill	Psychiatrist	Uncredited
1962	Guns of Darkness	Hospital Doctor	
1969	Fräulein Doktor	Lean Agent	
1969	Alfred the Great	Bishop	Uncredited
1969	Captain Nemo and the Underwater City	The Engineer	Uncredited
1984	Success Is the Best Revenge	Magistrate	
1985	Brazil	Interview Official	
1986	The Whistle Blower	The Make-Up Man	
1989	The Rainbow	Vicar	
1990	Mountains of the Moon	Doctor	
1990	Chicago Joe and the Showgirl	Insp. Tansill	
1996	Jane Eyre	Reverend Wood	
1996	The Secret Agent	Yundt	
1998	Les Misérables	Clerk	
1998	The Tichborne Claimant	Workhouse Master	
2000	Esther Kahn	Manager	
2005	Mrs Henderson Presents	Leslie Pearkes	
2009	My Life in Ruins	Barnaby	(final film role)
