= The White Unicorn =

- Original British trade advertisement
- Directed by: Bernard Knowles; Charles Saunders (as location director)
- Screenplay by: Moie Charles; A. R. Rawlinson; Robert Westerby
- Based on: novel The Milk-White Unicorn by Flora Sandström
- Produced by: Harold Huth
- Starring: Margaret Lockwood; Joan Greenwood; Ian Hunter; Dennis Price
- Cinematography: Reginald H. Wyer
- Edited by: Robert Johnson
- Music by: Bretton Byrd
- Production company: John Corfield Productions
- Distributed by: General Film Distributors (UK)
- Release dates: 30 October 1947 (London); June 1948 (US)
- Running time: 97 minutes
- Country: United Kingdom
- Language: English
- Budget: £150,000 (approx)

The White Unicorn (U.S. title: Bad Sister; also known as Milkwhite Unicorn) is a 1947 British drama film directed by Bernard Knowles and starring Margaret Lockwood, Joan Greenwood, Ian Hunter and Dennis Price. It was written by Moie Charles, A. R. Rawlinson and Robert Westerby.

== Plot ==
At a home for delinquent girls, a troublesome girl swaps reminiscences with the warden, who recounts her own unhappy marriage, divorce and the tragic death of her second husband.

== Cast ==
- Margaret Lockwood as Lucy
- Joan Greenwood as Lottie Smith
- Ian Hunter as Philip Templar
- Dennis Price as Richard Glover
- Eileen Peel as Joan
- Guy Middleton as Fobey
- Catherine Lacey as Miss Cater
- Paul Dupuis as Paul
- Bryl Wakely as Matron of remand home
- Joan Rees as Alice Walters
- Mabel Constanduros as nurse
- Lily Kann as Shura
- Valentine Dyall as Storton
- Julia Lockwood as Norey
- Vernon Conway as son of pompous Matron
- Kyra Vayne as singer
- Cecil Bevan as Clerk to the Assizes
- John Boxer as Bill
- Dorothy Bramhall as parlourmaid
- Clifford Cobbe as drunken Father
- Amy Dalby as landlady
- David Evans as Ted, parcels boy
- John Howard as Kaarlo
- Noel Howlett as Sir Humphrey Webster
- Elizabeth Maude as Mrs. Madden
- Robert Moore as Clerk to the Judge
- Thelma Rea as pompous Matron
- Desmond Roberts as elderly roue
- Stewart Rome as Charles Madden

== Production ==
In December 1946 Phyllis Calvert was scheduled to play the lead. Filming began in March 1947. The film was made at Nettleford Studios. It was used to help build up Joan Greenwood who Rank were trying to make a star. Some scenes had to be re-cut for release in the US, notably when Margaret Lockwood and Dennis Price's characters went on honeymoon – their twin beds were too close. Lockwood's daughter had a small role.

== Reception ==
=== Box office ===
According to trade papers, the film was a "notable box office attraction" at British cinemas in 1947.

=== Critical ===
The Monthly Film Bulletin wrote: "Margaret Lockwood is hardly convincing as the Warden of a reformatory at the mere sight of whom in resplendent tailor-made and elegant hair-do the most hardened delinquent stands to attention. Nor does her interpretation of emotional stress ring particularly true. Joan Greenwood, on the other hand, in spite of many limitations, gives a moving performance as Lottie Smith."

Bosley Crowther in The New York Times wrote: "It's not an especially dramatic or otherwise appetizing serving of entertainment that this new English film has to offer. In fact, one might well question the existence of any degree of entertainment in the sorry detailing of the lives of two unhappy women, one of whom loved unwisely while the other experienced two tragic marriages. Actually the title of the film [Bad Sister] is a misnomer, for there is nothing intrinsically evil about either of the central characters".

Variety wrote "... romantic melodrama will have rough handling by the highbrows, but should prove a box office winner. Story is on hokey side, but a tearjerker."
