= Charlie Girl =

British musical comedy

- Music: David Heneker; John Taylor
- Lyrics: David Heneker; John Taylor
- Book: Hugh Williams; Margaret Vyner (Williams); Ray Cooney
- Basis: Story conceived by Ross Taylor
- Productions: 1965 West End

Charlie Girl is a musical comedy which premiered at the Golder's Green Hippodrome on 25 November 1965 then transferred to London's West End at the Adelphi Theatre on December 15, 1965; it became one of the more successful theatre shows of the day, running for 2,202 performances. It closed on 27 March 1971.

== Productions ==
=== Original production ===
The original stars were Joe Brown (Joe Studholme), Christine Holmes (Charlie Hadwell), Anna Neagle (Lady Hadwell), Derek Nimmo (Nicholas Wainwright), Hy Hazell (Kay Connor), Jean Lloyd Grant Mostyn and Stuart Damon (Jack Connor). When Joe Brown left the show in 1968, he was replaced by Gerry Marsden (of Gerry & The Pacemakers).

Production credits included:

- Directed by Wallace Douglas
- Choreographed by Alfred Rodriques
- Setting by Tod Kingman
- Costumes by Cynthia Tingey
- Orchestrations by Arthur Wilkinson
- Musical Direction by Kenneth Alwyn

Neagle took the show to Australia in 1971, where English co-star Derek Nimmo appeared with popstar Johnny Farnham co-starring as Joe Studholme.

=== Revival ===
The show was revived in London in 1986 starring Paul Nicholas (Joe), Lisa Hull and later Bonnie Langford (Charlie Hadwell), Cyd Charisse (Lady Hadwell), Nicholas Parsons (Nicholas Wainwright), Dora Bryan (Kay Connor) and Mark Wynter (Jack Connor), running for six months at the Victoria Palace Theatre.

== Synopsis ==
Lady Hadwell, the widow of an aristocrat, is struggling to make ends meet by opening her home to the public. The youngest of her three daughters, Charlotte, known as Charlie, is a tomboy. Their loyal assistant, Joe, is in love with Charlie. When he learns he has won a fortune on the football pools, he conceals the fact from his employers. In the meantime, her mother is hoping for an engagement between Charlie and an American millionaire. In a comic moment (a parody of Cinderella), Charlie has to return her hired evening gown, and the rest of the guests at the ball also decide to cavort in their underwear.

== 1965 cast album song list ==
Act I

- Overture - "Charlie Girl"
- "Bells Will Ring"
- "What Would I Get from Being Married"
- "I Love Him, I Love Him"
- "What's the Magic"
- "Let's Do a Deal"
- "My Favourite Occupation"
- "I Was Young"

Act II

- "Party of a Lifetime"
- "I 'ates Money"
- "Charlie Girl Waltz"
- "Like Love"
- "That's It"
- "Fish and Chips"
- "You Never Know What You Can Do Until You Try It"
- "Charlie Girl"

== 1972 Australian cast recording ==
=== Charts ===
Chart (1972)	Position
Australia (Kent Music Report)	29

== 1986 cast album song list ==
Act I

- Overture
- "Most Ancestral Home of All"
- "Bells Will Ring"
- "Charlie Girl"
- "I Love Him, I Love Him (Bells Will Ring)"
- "What Would I Get From Being Married"
- "Let's Do a Deal"
- "My Favourite Occupation"
- "What's the Magic"
- "When I Hear Music, I Dance"

Act II

- "I 'ates Money"
- "Charlie Girl Waltz"
- "Party of a Lifetime"
- "Like Love"
- "That's It"
- "Washington"
- "Fish and Chips"
- "Society Twist"
- "You Never Know What You Can Do Until You Try"
- "Bells Will Ring/Charlie Girl" (Reprise)
- "Charlie Girl" (Finale)
