= Hugh Williams =

English actor (1904–1969)

- Born: Hugh Anthony Glanmor Williams; 6 March 1904; Bexhill-on-Sea, Sussex, England
- Died: 7 December 1969 (aged 65); London, England
- Years active: 1930–66
- Spouses: Gwynne Whitby (m. 1925; div. 1940) Margaret Vyner (m. 1940)
- Children: 5, including Hugo and Simon

Hugh Anthony Glanmor Williams (6 March 1904 – 7 December 1969) was an English actor and dramatist of Welsh descent.

== Early life and career ==
Hugh Anthony Glanmor Williams (nicknamed "Tam") was born at Bexhill-on-Sea, Sussex to Hugh Dafydd Anthony Williams (1869-1905) and Hilda (née Lewis). The Williams family lived at Bedford Park, in Chiswick, west London. His paternal grandfather was Hugh Williams (1796-1874), a Welsh solicitor and anti-establishment political activist. He trained at the Royal Academy of Dramatic Art. He was a popular film and stage actor, who became a major film star in the British cinema of the 1930s. In 1930 he toured America in the cast of the R.C. Sheriff play Journey's End and appeared in his first film Charley's Aunt during a spell in Hollywood. He then returned to Britain and became a mainstay of the British film industry. He made 57 film appearances as an actor between 1930 and 1967. He collaborated with his second wife on several plays, such as The Grass Is Greener and the screenplay for the subsequent film. He died from an aortic aneurysm, aged 65, in London.

During the Second World War, he served as a Captain in “Phantom” GHQ Liaison Regiment.

=== Marriages and grandchildren ===
He was married twice:

- Gwynne Whitby (1925–1940) (two children)
  - Lou Williams
  - Prue Williams
- Margaret Vyner (1940–1969) (three children):
  - Hugo Williams (born 1942), poet
  - Simon Williams (born 1946), actor who married Belinda Carroll and Lucy Fleming
  - Polly Williams (1950-2004), actress who married Nigel Havers

and his grandchildren included:

- Kate Dunn, actress
- Amy Williams, actress
- Tam Williams, actor

== Filmography ==
- Charley's Aunt (1930) as Charlie Wykeham
- A Night in Montmartre (1931) as Philip Borell
- A Gentleman of Paris (1931) as Gaston Gerrard
- Down Our Street (1932) as Charlie Stubbs
- Insult (1932) as Captain Ramon Nadir
- In a Monastery Garden (1932) as Paul Ferrier
- White Face (1932) as Michael Seeley
- Rome Express (1932) as Tony
- After Dark (1932) as Richard Morton
- This Acting Business (1933) as Hugh
- The Jewel (1933) as Frank Hallam
- Bitter Sweet (1933) as Vincent
- Sorrell and Son (1934) as Kit Sorrell as an Adult
- Elinor Norton (1934) as Tony Norton
- All Men Are Enemies (1934) as Tony Clarendon
- Outcast Lady (1934) as Gerald March
- Lieutenant Daring R.N. (1935) as Lt. Bob Daring
- David Copperfield (1935) as Steerforth
- Let's Live Tonight (1935) as Brian Kerry
- The Happy Family (1936) as Victor Hutt
- The Last Journey (1936) as Gerald Winter
- The Amateur Gentleman (1936) as Ronald
- Her Last Affaire (1936) as Alan Heriot
- The Man Behind the Mask (1936) as Nick Barclay
- The Windmill (1937) as Peter Ellington
- Side Street Angel (1937) as Peter
- Perfect Crime (1937) as Charles Brown
- Gypsy (1937) as Brazil
- Brief Ecstasy (1937) as Jim Wyndham
- Premiere (1938) as Rene Nissen
- The Dark Stairway (1938) as Dr. Thurlow
- Bank Holiday (1938) as Geoffrey
- His Lordship Goes to Press (1939) as Lord Bill Wilmer
- Wuthering Heights (1939) as Hindley Earnshaw
- Dead Men Tell No Tales (1939) as Detective Inspector Martin
- Inspector Hornleigh (1939) as Bill Gordon, Ann's Brother
- The Dark Eyes of London (1939) as Det. Insp. Larry Holt
- Ships with Wings (1942) as Wagner, Papa's Pilot
- The Day Will Dawn (1942) as Colin Metcalfe
- One of Our Aircraft Is Missing (1942) as Frank Shelley, Observer/Navigator in B for Bertie
- Secret Mission (1942) as Major Peter Garnett
- Talk About Jacqueline (1942) as Dr. Michael Thomas
- A Girl in a Million (1946) as Tony
- Take My Life (1947) as Nicholas Talbot
- An Ideal Husband (1947) as Sir Robert Chiltern
- Elizabeth of Ladymead (1948) as John Beresford in 1946
- The Blind Goddess (1948) as Lord Brasted
- The Romantic Age (1949) as Arnold Dickson
- Paper Orchid (1949) as Frank McSweeney
- Gift Horse (1952) as Captain David G. Wilson, Division Commander
- The Holly and the Ivy (1952) as Richard Wyndham
- Twice Upon a Time (1953) as James Turner
- The Fake (1953) as Sir Richard Aldingham
- Star of My Night (1954) as Arnold Whitman
- The Intruder (1953) as Tim Ross
- Khartoum (1966) as Lord Hartington
- Doctor Faustus (1967) as Scholar

== Writing credits ==
- The Grass Is Greener (play) (1952, book)
- Plaintiff in a Pretty Hat (1957, play, with Margaret Williams)
- The Grass Is Greener (1960, screenplay)
- The Irregular Verb to Love (1961, play, with Margaret Williams)
- Charlie Girl (book, with Margaret Williams)

== Selected stage roles ==
- Journey's End (1930)
- Grand Hotel (1931)
- While Parents Sleep (1932)
- Flowers of the Forest (1935)

== Notable television appearances ==
- Masterpiece Playhouse in episode: Richard III (episode No. 1.2) (1950)
- The Count of Monte Cristo playing Millet in episode: "Flight to Calais"
- Colonel March of Scotland Yard playing Harold Hartley in episode: "The Talking Head" (episode No. 1.11) (1956)
- Douglas Fairbanks, Jr., Presents as Shayar (sic!) in "Scheherezade" (episode No. 5.10) (1956)
- The New Adventures of Charlie Chan playing Inspector Marlowe in episode: "Dateline Execution" (episode No. 1.18) (1957)
- The New Adventures of Charlie Chan playing Inspector Marlowe in episode: "No Future for Frederick" (episode No. 1.23) (1958)
- The New Adventures of Charlie Chan playing Inspector Marlowe in episode: "Safe Deposit" (episode No. 1.24) (1958)

== Bibliography ==
- Sweet, Matthew. Shepperton Babylon: The Lost Worlds of British Cinema. Faber and Faber, 2005.
