= This Man Is Dangerous (1941 film) =

1941 British film

- Directed by: Lawrence Huntington
- Written by: John Argyle; Edward Dryhurst; David Hume
- Based on: 1934 novel They Called Him Death by David Hume
- Produced by: John Argyle
- Starring: James Mason; Margaret Vyner
- Cinematography: Bryan Langley
- Music by: Guy Jones
- Distributed by: British-Pathé
- Release date: 24 March 1941
- Running time: 82 minutes
- Country: United Kingdom
- Language: English

This Man Is Dangerous (U.S. title: The Patient Vanishes and Death Cell) is a 1941 British thriller film, directed by Lawrence Huntington and starring James Mason and Gordon McLeod. The film is based on the 1934 novel They Called Him Death by David Hume.

== Plot ==
Mick Cardby earns a living as a self-employed private detective, to the exasperation of his father, Detective Inspector Cardby of Scotland Yard, who would much prefer his son to enrol as a regular policeman.

A policeman is killed while on duty in Hyde Park and Scotland Yard are keen to catch the killer of their colleague. Mick launches his own enquiries, which lead him to Lord Morne who is frantic with worry as his daughter Lena has been abducted by a gang of blackmailers. Lord Morne offers Mick £1,000 to recover Lena safely. Mick gets to work and, aided by his secretary Molly, tracks down the kidnappers to a shady nursing home in a remote rural area. However they manage to flee with Lena to North Wales.

The kidnappers arrange a ransom drop with Lord Morne, but Mick arranges for him to go into hiding and goes to the rendezvous himself in disguise. His deception is uncovered and he is overpowered and taken to a derelict cargo ship. The gang use torture to try to get him to reveal Lord Morne's whereabouts, but Mick keeps his nerve and refuses to divulge the information. Finally they throw him into the ship's hold and set the vessel on fire. Mick manages to escape in the nick of time, and also rescues a member of the gang who had apparently been deemed surplus to requirements and had also been left to die on the blazing ship. This man is understandably disgruntled by his treatment at the hands of his former partners in crime, and is only to happy to help Mick out with the location where Lena is being held.

Mick makes his way to the hideout and approaches stealthily, but not well enough to avoid being spotted by a lookout. A dramatic confrontation follows, and just as things are starting to look desperate for Mick, his father turns up with a Scotland Yard posse to save the day. The gang is captured and the rescued Lena is reunited with her father. She expresses her gratitude to Mick, with the hope that they will get to know each other better.

== Cast ==
- James Mason as Mick Cardby
- Mary Clare as Matron
- Margaret Vyner as Molly Bennett
- Gordon McLeod as Inspector Cardby
- Frederick Valk as Dr. Moger
- Barbara Everest as Mrs. Cardby
- Barbara James as Lena Morne
- G. H. Mulcaster as Lord Morne
- Eric Clavering as Al Meason
- Terry Conlin as Detective Sergeant Trotter
- William Fay as Mr. Eslick
- Brefni O'Rorke as Dr. Crosbie
- Viola Lyel as nurse
- Anthony Shaw as Sir Wallace Benson
- Michael Rennie as Inspector

== Reception ==
Kine Weekly spoke of "exciting plot, fast action, good thrills, popular romantic and comedy asides, vigorous teamwork, hectic climax...", and added: "It gets away to a flying start and never calls a halt in its hectic gyrations...until crime is paid for in full, youth is vindicated and romance triumphs".

The Monthly Film Bulletin wrote: "An admirable cast under the very capable direction of Lawrence Huntington keep the suspense at boiling-point until the end."

According to the British Film Institute (BFI), in the U.S. the Motion Picture Herald "was unsure about the ability of American audiences to understand the British accents, but hailed it as 'a thrilling melodrama' and noted that 'there is plenty of action to keep audiences interested' ".

== Preservation status ==
The flm was included on the BFI's "75 Most Wanted" list of missing British feature films. It was subsequently discovered in its entirety after the location of an American reel in which the title card displays the US title of The Patient Vanishes, and was shown at the BFI in 2017.
