= The Caesars (TV series) =

1968 British TV drama series

- The Caesars DVD release.
- Genre: Drama
- Written by: Philip Mackie
- Directed by: Derek Bennett
- Starring: Freddie Jones; Caroline Blakiston; William Corderoy; André Morell
- Composer: Derek Hilton
- Country of origin: United Kingdom
- Original language: English
- No. of series: 1
- No. of episodes: 6

Production
- Producer: Philip Mackie
- Running time: 55 minutes
- Production company: Granada Television

Original release
- Network: ITV
- Release: 22 September – 27 October 1968

The Caesars is a British television series produced by Granada Television for the ITV network in 1968. Made in black-and-white and written and produced by Philip Mackie, it covered dramatic territory similar to that of the later BBC adaptation of I, Claudius, dealing with the lives of the early emperors of Ancient Rome, but differed in its less sensationalist depictions of historical characters and their motives; in particular, the Emperor Tiberius is portrayed much more sympathetically.

The show is credited with propelling the international career of actor Freddie Jones who played Emperor Claudius.

== Major cast ==
The major cast included:

- Roland Culver as Augustus
- Eric Flynn as Germanicus
- André Morell as Tiberius
- Barrie Ingham as Sejanus
- Ralph Bates as Caligula
- Freddie Jones as Claudius
- Sonia Dresdel as Livia
- Nicola Pagett as Messalina
- Suzan Farmer as Livilla
- William Corderoy as Drusus Julius Caesar
- Derek Newark as Agrippa Postumus
- Caroline Blakiston as Agrippina the Elder
- Donald Eccles as Marcus Cocceius Nerva (jurist)
- Martin Potter as Nero Julius Caesar
- Jonathan Collins as Tiberius Gemellus
- Pollyanna Williams as Julia Drusilla
- Jenny White as Julia Livilla
- Karol Keyes as Agrippina the Younger
- Barbara Murray as Milonia Caesonia
- Jerome Willis as Naevius Sutorius Macro
- Kevin Stoney as Thrasyllus of Mendes
- John Phillips as Gnaeus Calpurnius Piso
- John Paul as Cassius Chaerea
- Joan Heath as Munatia Plancina
- Wanda Ventham as Ennia Thrasylla
- Sean Arnold as Marcus Aemlius Lepidus
- John Normington as Gaius Julius Callistus
- John Woodvine as Publius Vitellius the Younger
- Gerald Harper as Lucius Vitellius the Elder
- Mark Hawkins as Mnester
- Roger Rowland as Quintus Veranius
- Charles Lloyd-Pack as Crispus
- George Sewell as Ennius

== Episode list ==
All six episodes were written by Philip Mackie and directed by Derek Bennett.

No.	Title	Directed by	Written by	Original release date
1	"Augustus"	Derek Bennett	Philip Mackie	22 September 1968
2	"Germanicus"	Derek Bennett	Philip Mackie	29 September 1968
3	"Tiberius"	Derek Bennett	Philip Mackie	6 October 1968
4	"Sejanus"	Derek Bennett	Philip Mackie	13 October 1968
5	"Caligula"	Derek Bennett	Philip Mackie	20 October 1968
6	"Claudius"	Derek Bennett	Philip Mackie	27 October 1968

== DVD release ==
The Caesars was released on DVD (Region 2, UK) by Network in April 2006.
