= Joan Greenwood =

English actress (1921–1987)

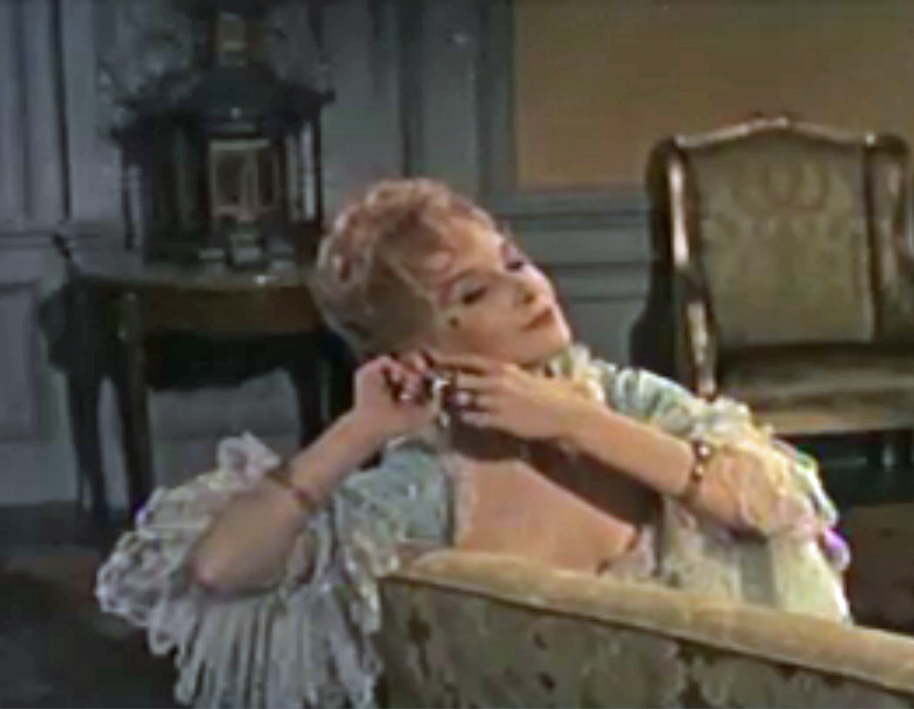
- Greenwood in Moonfleet (1955)
- Born: Joan Mary Waller Greenwood; 4 March 1921; Chelsea, London, England
- Died: 28 February 1987 (aged 65); Chelsea, London, England
- Occupation: Actress
- Years active: 1938–1987
- Spouse: André Morell (m. 1960; died 1978)
- Children: 1

Joan Mary Waller Greenwood Mesritz (4 March 1921 – 28 February 1987) was an English actress. Her husky voice, coupled with her slow, precise elocution, was her trademark. She played Sibella in the 1949 film Kind Hearts and Coronets, and also appeared in The Man in the White Suit, Young Wives' Tale (both 1951), The Importance of Being Earnest (1952), Stage Struck (1958), Tom Jones (1963) and Little Dorrit (1987).

Greenwood worked mainly on the stage, where she had a long career, appearing with Donald Wolfit's theatre company in the years following the Second World War. Her appearances in Ealing comedies are among her memorable screen roles: in Whisky Galore! (1949); as the seductive Sibella in the black comedy Kind Hearts and Coronets (1949); and in The Man in the White Suit (1951). She opened The Grass Is Greener in the West End in 1952, and played Gwendolen in a film version of The Importance of Being Earnest released in the same year.

She had leading roles in Stage Struck (1958) and then in Mysterious Island (1961), an adaptation of a Jules Verne novel; and was nominated for the Golden Globe for Best Supporting Actress for Tom Jones (1963).

In 1960, Greenwood appeared as the titular character in a production of Hedda Gabler at the Oxford Playhouse. Starring opposite her as Judge Brack was the actor André Morell. They fell in love and flew in secret to Jamaica, where they were married; they remained together until his death in 1978.

== Early life and education ==
Greenwood was born in 1921 in Chelsea, London. Her parents were Ida (née Waller) and Sydney Earnshaw Greenwood (1887–1949), a portrait artist. She went to school at St Catherine's School, Bramley, leaving when she was 15. She originally wanted to be a ballet dancer but then decided to act, and studied at the Royal Academy of Dramatic Art.

== Career ==
Greenwood worked for two years in repertory. Her fluency in French saw her cast in London in a production of The Imaginary Invalid when she was 18. Greenwood appeared in Little Ladyship (1939) on TV and in the short John Smith Wakes Up (1941). Her first feature was My Wife's Family followed by He Found a Star (both 1941).

She joined the Oxford Playhouse Repertory Company, and whilst there played leading parts in a number of well-known plays, such as School for Scandal, Caesar and Cleopatra, Hamlet and A Doll's House. She went back to the London stage and appeared in productions of Little Ladyship, Peter Pan, Heartbreak House, and The Women. While appearing in the latter she was seen by Leslie Howard who cast her in a notable role in The Gentle Sex (1943), which was a hit.

Greenwood had a supporting part in Frenzy (1945) and They Knew Mr. Knight (1946).

She appeared in the role of Wendy in Peter Pan and as Elie Dunn in Heartbreak House. She played Ophelia in Hamlet with the Donald Wolfit company, Nora in A Doll's House, Celia in Volpone and Sabina in The Young Wives' Tale.

=== Rank Organisation ===
Sydney Box offered her a seven-year contract with the Rank Organisation, starting with the female lead in A Girl in a Million (1946). Box was so taken with her performance he changed the title to refer to her.

She had a good role in The Man Within, billed after Michael Redgrave and Jean Kent, then co-starred alongside John Mills in The October Man and with Margaret Lockwood in The White Unicorn (all 1947).

=== Stardom ===
Greenwood was cast in the lead role of Saraband for Dead Lovers (1948), as Sophia Dorothea of Celle, alongside Stewart Granger, but it was an expensive box-office failure. She did The Importance of Being Earnest (1949) for TV; then played Lady Caroline Lamb in The Bad Lord Byron (1949), a notorious flop.

More successful was Whisky Galore! (1949), which kicked off the Ealing comedy cycle. It was directed by Alexander Mackendrick, and Greenwood was top-billed along with Basil Radford. She did another for Ealing, Kind Hearts and Coronets (1949), with Dennis Price and Alec Guinness, directed by Robert Hamer. Both films became regarded as comedy classics.

Greenwood was Richard Todd's leading lady in Flesh and Blood (1951), at British Lion. She went to France to co-star with Bourvil in Mr. Peek-a-Boo (1951). She did another for Ealing with Mackendrick and Guinness, The Man in the White Suit, then Young Wives' Tale (both 1951) and did The Importance of Being Earnest (1952) again, this time as a feature film. She appeared on TV shows such as BBC Sunday-Night Theatre.

Greenwood then appeared in Lovers, Happy Lovers! (1954), a French film shot at the Elstree Studios of Associated British and on location across London, with Gérard Philipe. She did The King and Mrs. Candle for American TV, and made her third film with Guinness and second with Hamer, Father Brown (both 1954). She did A Doll's House in Copenhagen, then was in The Confidential Clerk by T.S. Eliot which had a short run on Broadway in 1954.

In Hollywood, she was the female lead in Moonfleet (1955) at MGM, replacing original choice Merle Oberon.

=== Later career ===
In 1956, Greenwood starred in The Grass is Greener in the West End. In the late 1950s she worked increasingly on TV, in versions of Man and Superman, Ann Veronica, Hedda Gabler and The Grass is Greener. She had a support role in Stage Struck (1958), Mysterious Island (1961) and the female lead in The Amorous Mr. Prawn (1962). She married Andre Morell in 1960.

Greenwood had a flashy support role in Tom Jones (1963), and The Moon-Spinners (1964). She appeared as Olga, alongside Spike Milligan in Frank Dunlop's production of the play Oblomov, based on the novel by Russian writer Ivan Goncharov. The play opened at London's Lyric Theatre on 6 October 1964. Greenwood was described as "a model of generosity and tolerance...the only person in the cast who could not be 'corpsed' by Milligan; although he tried very hard. She looked beautiful, and played the part of Oblomov's unfortunate lady with total integrity. 'She never left the script', says Milligan with a guilty smile of something between irritation and admiration. 'I just couldn't make her crack up. All the rest of us did. She never lost her dignity for a moment.'"

She was in the play Those That Play the Clowns (1966) which had a short run on Broadway. Greenwood dubbed the voice of The Black Queen in Barbarella (1968) when the voice of actress Anita Pallenberg was judged unsuitable for the role. She was in The Great Inimitable Mr. Dickens (1970) and Girl Stroke Boy (1971).

Later roles included The Uncanny (1977), The Water Babies (1978), The Hound of the Baskervilles (1978), Bognor (1981), Triangle (1982), and Ellis Island (1985).

She took over from Dame Celia Johnson on stage in The Understanding (1982) after Johnson's death.

She played Lady Carlton, a quirky romance novelist and the landlady to the main characters, in the British sitcom Girls on Top (1985–86). She was in Miss Marple: At Bertram's Hotel (1987). Her last film was Little Dorrit (1988), released posthumously. Her last TV series was Melba (1988).

She appeared on stage in a sketch with Robert Morley two weeks before her death.

== Personal life and death ==
Greenwood married André Morell in 1960. Their son Jason Morell is an actor, writer and film/theatre director. On 28 February 1987, nine years after her husband's death, Greenwood died from acute bronchitis and asthma at her home in London.

== Partial filmography ==
- My Wife's Family (1941) – Irma Bagshott
- He Found a Star (1941) – Babe Cavour
- The Gentle Sex (1943) – Betty Miller
- Latin Quarter (1945) – Christine Minetti
- They Knew Mr. Knight (1946) – Ruth Blake
- A Girl in a Million (1946) – Gay Sultzman
- The Man Within (1947) – Elizabeth
- The October Man (1947) – Jenny Carden
- The White Unicorn (1947) – Lottie Smith
- Saraband for Dead Lovers (1948) – Sophie Dorothea
- The Bad Lord Byron (1949) – Lady Caroline Lamb
- Whisky Galore! (1949) – Peggy Macroon
- Kind Hearts and Coronets (1949) – Sibella
- Flesh & Blood (1951) – Wilhelmina Cameron
- Le Passe-muraille (English: Mr Peek-a-boo) (1951) – Susan
- The Man in the White Suit (1951) – Daphne Birnley
- Young Wives' Tale (1951) – Sabina Pennant
- The Importance of Being Earnest (1952) – Gwendolen Fairfax
- Monsieur Ripois (1954) – Norah
- Father Brown (1954) – Lady Warren
- Moonfleet (1955) – Lady Ashwood
- Stage Struck (1958) – Rita Vernon
- Mysterious Island (1961) – Lady Mary Fairchild
- The Amorous Prawn (1962) – Lady Dodo Fitzadam
- Tom Jones (1963) – Lady Bellaston
- The Moon-Spinners (1964) – Aunt Frances Ferris
- Barbarella (1968) – The Great Tyrant (voice, uncredited)
- Girl Stroke Boy (1971) – Lettice Mason
- The Uncanny (1977) – Miss Malkin (segment "London 1912")
- The Water Babies (1978, animated film) – Lady Harriet
- The Hound of the Baskervilles (1978) – Beryl Stapleton
- The Flame Is Love (1979, TV Movie) – Duchess of Grantham
- Strangers and Brothers (1984) – Lady Boscastle
- Ellis Island (1984) – Madame Levitska
- At Bertram's Hotel (1987, TV Movie) – Selina Hazy
- Little Dorrit (1987) – Mrs. Clennam
