= The Mummy's Shroud =

1967 British film by John Gilling

- Theatrical release poster
- Directed by: John Gilling
- Written by: John Gilling; Anthony Hinds
- Produced by: Michael Carreras
- Starring: André Morell; John Phillips; David Buck; Maggie Kimberly; Elizabeth Sellars
- Cinematography: Arthur Grant
- Edited by: Chris Barnes
- Music by: Don Banks
- Production company: Hammer Film Productions
- Distributed by: Warner-Pathé
- Release dates: 15 March 1967 (U.S.); 18 June 1967 (U.K.)
- Running time: 90 min
- Country: United Kingdom
- Language: English
- Budget: £160,000

The Mummy's Shroud is a 1967 British horror film made by Hammer Film Productions. The DeLuxe colour work was directed by John Gilling.

It stars André Morell and David Buck as explorers who uncover the tomb of an ancient Egypt]ian mummy. It also starred John Phillips, Maggie Kimberly, Elizabeth Sellars and Michael Ripper as Longbarrow. Stuntman Eddie Powell (Christopher Lee's regular stunt double) played the Mummy, brought back to life to wreak revenge on his enemies. The uncredited narrator in the prologue, sometimes incorrectly assumed to be Peter Cushing, is British actor Tim Turner.

It was the third of Hammer's four Mummy films, a cycle which began with The Mummy (1959), continued with The Curse of the Mummy's Tomb (1964), and ended with Blood from the Mummy's Tomb (1971).

It was the final Hammer production to be made at Bray Studios, the company's home until 1967, when its productions moved to Elstree Studios and occasionally Pinewood.

== Plot ==
The Mummy's Shroud is set in 1920 and tells the story of a team of archaeologists who come across the lost tomb of the boy Pharaoh Kah-To-Bey. The story begins with a flash back sequence to Ancient Egypt and we see the story of how Prem, a manservant of Kah-To-Bey, spirited away the boy when his father was killed in a palace coup and took him into the desert for protection. The boy dies and is buried.

The story then moves forward to 1920 and shows the expedition led by scientist Sir Basil Walden, and businessman Stanley Preston finding the tomb. They ignore the dire warning issued to them by Hasmid, a local Bedouin about the consequences for those that violate the tombs of Ancient Egypt and remove the bodies and the sacred shroud. Sir Basil is bitten by a venomous snake just after finding the tomb. He recovers, but has a relapse after arriving back in Cairo.

Preston takes advantage of this and commits him to an insane asylum to take credit for finding the tomb and the Prince's mummy himself. Meanwhile, after being placed in the Cairo Museum, the mummy of Prem is revived when Hasmid chants the sacred oath on the shroud. The mummy then proceeds to go on a murderous rampage to kill off the members of the expedition, beginning with Sir Basil after he escapes from the asylum. One by one, those who assisted in removing the contents of the tomb to Cairo are eliminated by such grisly means as strangulation, being thrown out of windows, and having photographic acid thrown in their face. Greedy Stanley Preston, the real villain of the piece, after repeated attempts to evade the murder investigations and flee for his own safety, is murdered in a Cairo side street by the avenging mummy. The remaining members of the party, Stanley's son Paul Preston and Maggie Claire de Sangre, succeed in destroying the mummy.

== Cast ==
- André Morell as Sir Basil Walden (as Andre Morell)
- John Phillips as Stanley Preston
- David Buck as Paul Preston
- Elizabeth Sellars as Barbara Preston
- Maggie Kimberly as Claire (as Maggie Kimberley)
- Michael Ripper as Longbarrow
- Tim Barrett as Harry
- Richard Warner as Inspector Barrani
- Roger Delgado as Hasmid
- Catherine Lacey as Haiti
- Dickie Owen as Prem
- Bruno Barnabe as Pharaoh
- Toni Gilpin as Pharaoh's Wife
- Toolsie Persaud as Kah-to-Bey
- Eddie Powell as The Mummy
- Andreas Malandrinos as the Curator
- John Roshi as the Arab Cleaner (uncredited)
- Tim Turner as Narrator (uncredited)

Note: Owen, who played the Mummy in the previous entry, here plays the character who becomes the Mummy, but is replaced by Powell as the actual mummy.

== Critical reception ==
The Monthly Film Bulletin wrote: "Stilted rehash of the old avenging mummy routine, brightened from time to time by Catherine Lacey as a toothless hag [...] The rest of the cast huff and puff over their moribund lines, and the plot contains no surprises". Variety declared: "Although macabre sequences create some tension and splash a lot of gore, dialog, characterizations and plot have little to recommend them [...] John Gilling both wrote the screenplay and directed it, but showed little originality in either endeavor. Several crowd scenes did not disguise appearance that pic was on the low side of low budget scale". Dan Bates of Film Quarterly lamented the "successively more repulsive ways" that the mummy did in its victims and asked: "Whatever happened to the old idea that the best screen horror is left unseen? It's forgotten here. Which is rather sad, since Gilling, who also made the superior The Reptile for Hammer, handles his actors remarkably well".

Allmovie's review of the film was unfavourable: "The Mummy's Shroud is a standard issue spook show that recycles elements from the previous two mummy titles [...] without any of their atmosphere, imagination or suspense".

== Home media ==
It was released on DVD in the U.S. in 2000 on the Anchor Bay label. It is rated PG, uncut, in the U.K., a long way from its original X certificate in the cinema. It was released on Blu-ray on 14 January 2020 by Shout! Factory, with a commentary track, making-of documentary, and other extras.

== In other media ==
The film was adapted into a 12-page comic strip for the magazine The House of Hammer (vol. 2) #15 (December 1977), published by Top Sellers Ltd. It was drawn by David Jackson from a script by Donne Avenell. The cover of the issue featured a painting by Brian Lewis, depicting a scene from the film.
