= The October Man =

- theatrical poster
- Directed by: Roy Ward Baker
- Written by: Eric Ambler
- Produced by: Eric Ambler
- Starring: John Mills; Joan Greenwood; Kay Walsh
- Cinematography: Erwin Hillier
- Edited by: Alan Jaggs
- Music by: William Alwyn
- Production company: Two Cities Films
- Distributed by: General Film Distributors (UK); Eagle-Lion Films (US)
- Release dates: 28 August 1947 (London); 15 April 1948 (NYC); 20 May 1948 (US gen'l)
- Running time: 91 minutes
- Country: United Kingdom
- Language: English
- Budget: over $1 million

The October Man is a 1947 mystery film/film noir starring John Mills and Joan Greenwood, written by novelist Eric Ambler, who also produced. A man is suspected of murder, and the lingering effects of a brain injury he sustained in an earlier accident, as well as an intensive police investigation, make him begin to doubt whether he is innocent.

== Plot ==
When a bus crashes due to faulty steering, passenger Jim Ackland (John Mills) sustains a serious brain injury and a young girl under his care is killed. Guilt-ridden, he attempts suicide twice during his recovery.

He starts a new job as an industrial chemist and gets a room in a hotel. When he reluctantly accepts an invitation for a night out, he meets Jenny Carden (Joan Greenwood), the sister of his colleague Harry (Patrick Holt). They begin seeing each other quite regularly. Things reach the point that he confesses he wants to marry her, but he tells her that he wants to be sure he has fully recovered first.

Molly Newman (Kay Walsh), one of the other hotel residents, asks to borrow £30 from him, a rather substantial sum. As he does not have that much on him, Jim agrees to write her a cheque. She is found strangled the next night.

Wilcox (Jack Melford), a married businessman Molly had been seeing, has an alibi. Jim admits to have been walking in the vicinity of the murder site. That and the recovered cheque from the crime scene and his head injury make him the prime suspect. Police Inspector Godby (Frederick Piper) suspects he was another of Molly's boyfriends and that after falling in love with Jenny, he wanted to rid himself of a possible blackmailer.

When Jim learns that Mr Peachy, the person who lived in the room directly below Molly's, had falsely told the police that Jim was in her room every night, Jim confronts him in his room. Peachy brazenly admits killing Molly since he is confident that there is no evidence against him. He had regularly given her money. When Jim made her a loan, it had given rise to Peachy's insane jealousy, with fatal results.

Jim goes to the police, but they do not believe him. When they come to take him into custody, Jim flees. He follows Peachy to Paddington Station and discovers from a tag on the man's luggage that he intends to flee the country by plane. He phones Godby with the flight information, but when that appears to have no effect, he contemplates suicide again. Then, a letter Molly had posted to Wilcox just before her death is found. It incriminates Peachy, who is arrested. Jenny finds Jim and gives him the good news.

== Cast ==
- John Mills as Jim Ackland
- Joan Greenwood as Jenny Carden
- Edward Chapman as Mr Peachy
- Joyce Carey as Mrs Vinton, a hotel resident
- Kay Walsh as Molly Newman
- Catherine Lacey as Miss Selby, the hotel manager
- Adrianne Allen as Joyce Carden
- Frederick Piper as Detective Inspector Godby
- Felix Aylmer as Dr Martin
- Patrick Holt as Harry Carden
- George Benson as Mr Pope, a sympathetic hotel resident
- Jack Melford as Wilcox
- John Boxer as Detective Sergeant Troth
- Esme Beringer as Miss Heap
- Ann Wilton as Miss Parsons
- James Hayter as Garage man
- Sid James as uncredited man who bumps into Ackland when he first arrives at Brockhurst Common

Cast notes:

- John Mills's daughter, Juliet Mills, plays the part of the young child who is killed in the bus accident at the beginning of the film. She was five years old at the time, and it was her third film appearance.

== Production ==
Director Roy Ward Baker was an assistant director for Alfred Hitchcock on The Lady Vanishes (1938), while cinematographer Erwin Hillier had photographed Michael Powell and Emeric Pressburger's I Know Where I'm Going (1945). The film was made at Denham Studios in Buckinghamshire, England, and location shooting was done at Paddington Station in London. The film's sets were designed by the art director Alex Vetchinsky. Eric Ambler's screenplay is sometimes stated to be from a novel by Ambler, but there is no such novel.

== Reception ==
In his New York Times review, Bosley Crowther called it a "second rate film" with "a first-rate actor [John Mills]...surrounded by a generally competent cast". In general, though, the film received good critical notices.

=== Box office ===
According to trade papers, the film was a "notable box office attraction" at British cinemas in 1947.
