= The Shadow of the Cat =

1961 British film by John Gilling

- Theatrical release poster
- Directed by: John Gilling
- Written by: George Baxt
- Produced by: Jon Penington
- Starring: André Morell, Barbara Shelley
- Cinematography: Arthur Grant
- Edited by: James Needs; John Pomeroy
- Music by: Mikis Theodorakis
- Color process: Black and white
- Production companies: BHP; Hammer Films
- Distributed by: Rank Organisation (United Kingdom); Universal International (United States)
- Release dates: 1 May 1961 (UK); 7 June 1961 (USA)
- Running time: 79 minutes
- Country: United Kingdom
- Language: English
- Budget: £81,000

The Shadow of the Cat is a 1961 British horror film directed by John Gilling and starring André Morell and Barbara Shelley. It was written by George Baxt and photographed in black-and-white by Arthur Grant. Produced by Hammer Film Productions, it was released in May 1961 on a double feature bill with Curse of the Werewolf.

The story is about Tabitha, the house cat of a wealthy lady Ella Venable, who witnesses the murder of her owner by her owner's husband Walter and two servants Andrew and Clara. The cat becomes bent on revenge while the murderers try to kill her, the only witness.

== Plot ==
Late at night in early 1900s England, wealthy and elderly Ella Venable is murdered in her manor house by Andrew the butler in collusion with Ella's husband, Walter, and Clara the maid. Tabitha, Ella's tabby cat, witnesses the murder. The murderers resolve to kill her. Walter forced Ella to sign a will that left everything to him. However, her original will — which left Walter nothing — remains hidden in the attic. Walter needs to find and destroy this original to ensure his inheritance.

Inspector Rowles and newspaper man Michael Latimer are called to the house to investigate Ella's disappearance. Walter invites Ella's favorite niece, Elizabeth "Beth" Venable, to stay at the house. He worries that she might question the illegitimate will and wants to deal with her in person. Beth and Michael are old friends from when she lived with Ella, and they become increasingly close.

While searching for the will, Walter has an accident in the structurally unsound attic, followed by an encounter with Tabitha which causes him to have a heart attack. Bedridden and unable to continue the search for the will, he invites his brother Edgar; Edgar's criminal son, Jacob; and Jacob's wife, Louise, to the house. He promises them a share of Ella's money if they find her original will and kill Tabitha. They set a cage trap baited with mice, with which they capture Tabitha. They put Tabitha in a sack and send Andrew to drown her, but they forget to tie the sack shut, so Tabitha simply runs out when Andrew drops it. He pursues her into the swamp but falls in and drowns.

Beth is baffled that everyone is so afraid of a harmless domestic animal like Tabitha, while Michael says their fear may stem from guilty consciences, making him suspect they are culpable in Ella's disappearance.

Clara, frightened by the sight of Tabitha, falls down the stairs and dies. Jacob continues to search the attic for Ella's will but, fearing Walter may not keep his part of the bargain, turns on his uncle. He lets Tabitha into Walter's bedroom. When Walter sees the cat, he has a second, fatal heart attack. His will leaves everything to Edgar.

Beth, Michael and Inspector Rowles accuse the remaining villains of conspiracy. Edgar, now owner of the manor, orders them out. As they leave, Jacob sees Tabitha and pursues the cat onto the roof with everyone watching. He slips and falls to his death.

Edgar uses the distraction to go to the attic. He finds the original will hidden in the attic wall behind a painting of Tabitha. Tabitha herself appears and Edgar tries frantically to kill her, demolishing the attic in the process, and he is struck and killed by a falling beam.

Tabitha leads the police to Ella's body, which was buried in the swamp. The original will leaves everything to Beth. She tells Michael that she never wants to see the house again and asks him to take her away.

The house is sold and Tabitha watches from the courtyard as a new family — husband, wife, daughter and grandfather — move in. The grandfather complains that he will probably die of boredom living there, while the husband and wife talk of convincing the old man to change his will.

== Cast ==
- André Morell as Walter Venable
- Barbara Shelley as Beth Venable
- William Lucas as Jacob Venable
- Freda Jackson as Clara
- Conrad Phillips as Michael Latimer
- Richard Warner as Edgar Venable
- Vanda Godsell as Louise Venable
- Alan Wheatley as Inspector Rowles
- Andrew Crawford as Andrew
- Kynaston Reeves as Grandfather
- Catherine Lacey as Ella Venable
- Henry Kendall as Doctor
- Bunkie as Tabitha

== Critical reception ==
The Monthly Film Bulletin wrote: "Uninterestingly plotted Old Dark House thriller, overplayed, long drawn out, and fatally lacking in nuance and atmosphere."

Kine Weekly wrote: "Fascinating and suspenseful creepie."

Variety wrote: "The film, in spite of its distorted degree of felinearity, is prevented from growing monotonous or ludicrous by acting of a high order, mood-molding direction (John Gilling's) and considerable photographic ingenuity, notably cameraman Arthur Grant's device of distorting the picture to represent the cat's-eye-view of the dastardly vendetta. There's not a poor performance in the film, and that goes, as well, for the cat, trained for cinematic good behavior by John Holmes."

In The Radio Times Guide to Films Alan Jones gave the film 2/5 stars, writing: "This tale of a manic moggy exacting a terrible revenge on those who conspired to kill its mistress is only a serviceable melodrama at best, despite the addition of House of Horror heroine Barbara Shelley. Notable for the way Gilling shows the deaths of the terrified murderers through the eyes of the feline, but not much else."
