= The Grass Is Greener (play) =

1956 Play by Hugh and Margaret Williams

The Grass Is Greener is a 1956 two act comedy written by Hugh Williams and Margaret Williams. It opened at St. Martin's Theatre in the West End of London, on 2 December. Joan Greenwood starred as Hattie, with Williams playing Victor, the Earl of Rhyall, Edward Underdown playing Charles, an American tourist, and Celia Johnson playing Hilary, the Countess of Rhyall. Jack Minster directed.

== Plot ==
The Earl and Countess of Rhyall, needing revenue, have opened their residence Hampshire manor to tourists. A visiting American falls in love with the Earl's wife; the Earl, in turn, attempts to use an old flame to make his wife jealous.

== Critical reception ==
J. C. Trewin includes The Grass Is Greener as one of the top four plays of 1958–59. He describes The Grass Is Greener as the best of the Williamses' three comedies, noting its "glancing wit" and "well-bred ease." Trewin describes the play as "neatly constructed," with much of the comedy coming from "apparent irrelevance."

== Film ==
The Williamses wrote the screenplay for the 1960 film adaptation The Grass Is Greener, with Cary Grant and Deborah Kerr playing the lead roles.
