= Franz Cumont =

Belgian archaeologist and historian

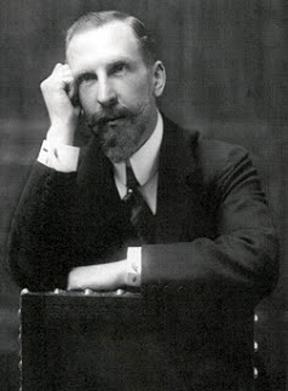
- Born: 3 January 1868; Aalst, Belgium
- Died: 20 August 1947 (aged 79); Woluwe-Saint-Pierre
- Education: University of Ghent
- Awards: Francqui Prize (1936)
- Scientific career
- Fields: archeology

Franz-Valéry-Marie Cumont (3 January 1868 in Aalst, Belgium – 20 August 1947 in Woluwe-Saint-Pierre near Brussels) was a Belgian archaeologist and historian, a philologist and student of epigraphy, who brought these often isolated specialties to bear on the syncretic mystery religions of Late Antiquity, notably Mithraism.

== Biography ==
Cumont was a graduate of the University of Ghent (PhD, 1887). After receiving royal travelling fellowships, he undertook archaeology in Pontus and Armenia (published in 1906) and in Syria, but he is best known for his studies on the impact of Eastern mystery religions, particularly Mithraism, on the Roman Empire. Cumont's international credentials were brilliant, but his public circumspection was not enough. In 1910, Baron Edouard Descamps, the Catholic Minister of Sciences and Arts at the University of Ghent, refused to approve the faculty's unanimous recommendation of Cumont for the chair in Roman History, Cumont having been a professor there since 1906. There was a vigorous press campaign and student agitation in Cumont's favor, because the refusal was seen as blatant religious interference in the university's life. When another candidate was named, in 1912, Cumont resigned his positions at the university and at the Royal Museum in Brussels, left Belgium and henceforth divided his time between Paris and Rome.

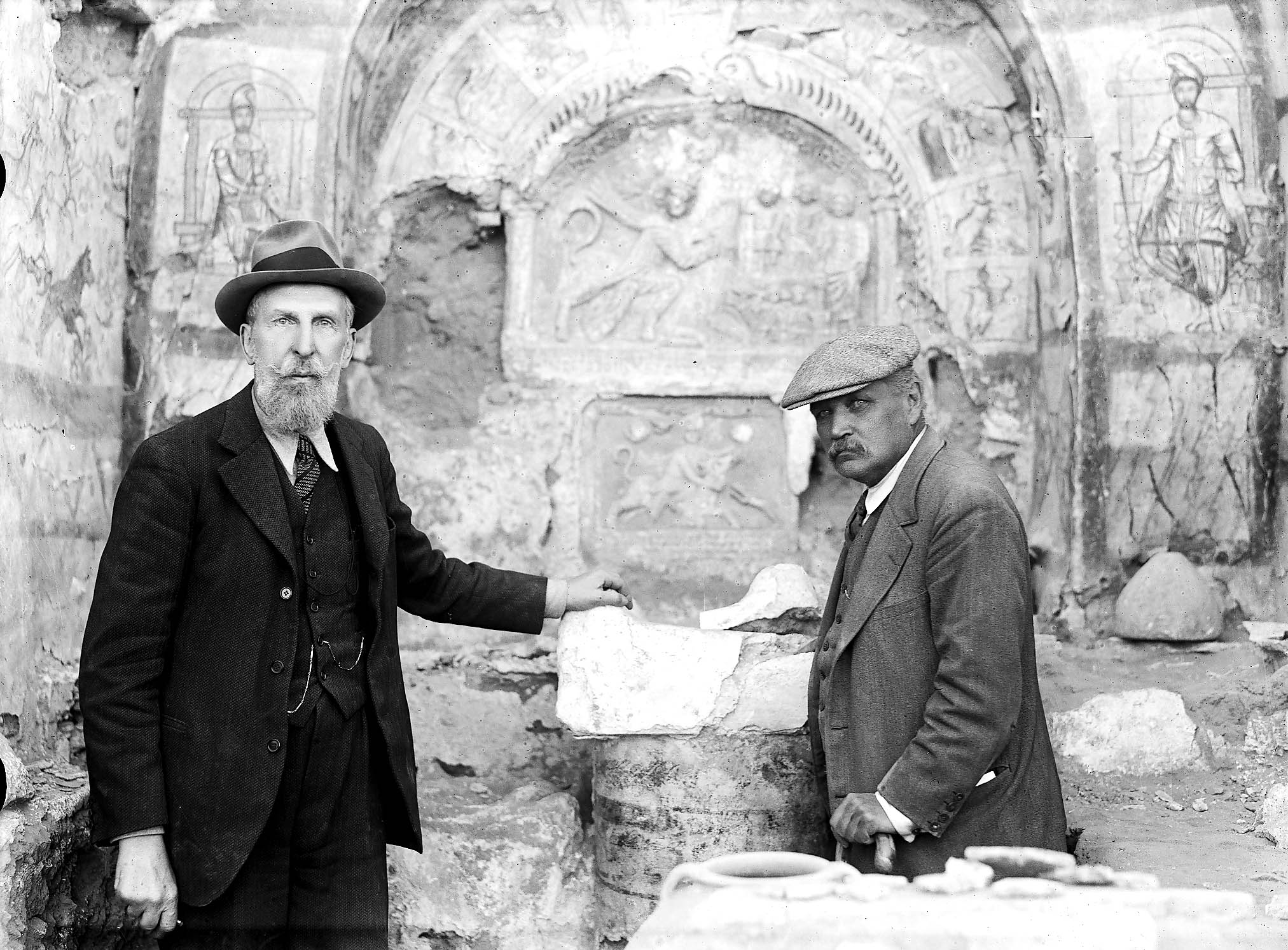
Cumont and Rostovtzeff in the Mithraeum of Dura-Europos in Syria

He contributed to many standard encyclopedias, published voluminously and in 1922, under stressful political conditions, conducted digs on the shore of the Euphrates at the previously unknown site of Dura-Europos; he published his research there in 1926. He was a member of most of the European academies. In 1936 Franz Cumont was awarded the Francqui Prize on Human Sciences. He was elected an international member of the American Philosophical Society in 1940. In 1947, Franz Cumont donated his library and papers to the Academia Belgica in Rome, where they are accessible to researchers.

His works include

- Catalogus Codicum Astrologorum Graecorum (1898–1953)
- Texts and Illustrated Monuments Relating to the Mysteries of Mithra (1894–1900, with an English translation in 1903) is the study that made his international reputation, by its originality and massive documentation.
- Les religions orientales dans le paganisme romain (1906, widely translated)
- After-Life in Roman Paganism, lectures delivered at Yale University, published in 1922, was cautiously expressed, but it corrected many false impressions of pagan rite that Christian apologists had made.
- Astrology and Religion Among the Greeks and Romans, published in 1912 (available in a Dover reprint)

After his death, critics of his interpretation of Mithras as the descendant of the Iranian deity Mithra began to be heard, and surfaced at the First International Congress of Mithraic Studies in Manchester England, 1971. Modern interpretation of Mithras as the astronomical bull-slayer have continued to move away from Cumont's interpretations, though his documentation remains valuable.

In 1997 the Royal Library, Brussels, observed the fiftieth anniversary of Cumont's death appropriately, with a colloquium on syncretism in the Mediterranean world of Antiquity. In 2010 the Belgian publisher Brepols started an edition of Cumont's collected works. The volumes are published in two series as 'major' and 'minor' writings identified by the acronyms BICUMA and BICUMI.

== Bibliotheca Cumontiana ==
- 2010 Les religions orientales dans le paganisme romain, BICUMA 1
- 2010 Lux perpetua, BICUMA 2
- 2013 Les mystères de Mithra, BICUMA 3
- 2015 Recherches sur le symbolisme funéraire des Romains, BICUMA 4
- 2017 Comment la Belgique fut romanisée, BICUMA 5
- 2022 Studia Pontica II, BICUMA 6
- 2015 Astrologie, BICUMI 4
- 2017 Manichéisme, BICUMI 6
- 2020 Doura-Europos, BICUMI 7
- F. Cumont, Lux perpetua, B. Rochette, A. Motte (eds.), Turnhout, Brepols Publishers, 2010, ISBN 978-88-8419-423-7
- F. Cumont, Les religions orientales dans le paganisme romain, C. Bonnet, F. Van Haeperen (eds.), Turnhout, Brepols Publishers, 2010, ISBN 978-88-8419-289-9

=== Works by Cumont online ===
- Works by Franz Cumont at Project Gutenberg
- Works by or about Franz Cumont at the Internet Archive
- Mysteries of Mithra, by Franz Cumont (English translation) at sacred-texts.com
- The Oriental Religions in Roman Paganism, by Franz Cumont (English translation) at sacred-texts.com
- Astrology and Religion Among the Greeks and Romans, by Franz Cumont at sacred-texts.com

=== Critiques ===
- David Ulansey, "The Cosmic Mysteries of Mithras" David Ulansey's zodiacal interpretation of Mithraism
- Lannoy, Annelies; Praet, Danny, eds. (2023). The Christian mystery: early Christianity and the ancient mystery cults in the work of Franz Cumont and in the history of scholarship. Stuttgart: Franz Steiner Verlag. ISBN 9783515131971.
