= Catalogus Codicum Astrologorum Graecorum =

Catalogue of astrological writings in Greek

Catalogus Codicum Astrologorum Graecorum (CCAG) is a 12-volume (including appendices) catalogue of astrological writings in Greek. The CCAG edited, described, and excerpted from texts found in libraries throughout Europe, most edited and catalogued for the first time. The CCAG was published between 1898 and 1953 in Brussels. The chief editors in the earlier period of publication were Franz Cumont and Franz Boll. The CCAG was described as the "most important" modern survey of Greek astrological writings.

== See also ==
Catalogus Codicum Astrologorum Latinorum is a continuation of CCAG for texts in Latin. David Just is the sole editor for the early volumes that appeared in the 21-st c.
