= Naevius Sutorius Macro =

Prefect of the Praetorian Guard (21 BC - AD 38)

Quintus Naevius Cordus Sutorius Macro

Praetorian Prefect
- In office AD 31 – AD 38
- Preceded by: Lucius Aelius Sejanus
- Succeeded by: Marcus Arrecinus Clemens and Lucius Arruntius Stella

Personal details
- Born: 21 BC Alba Fucens
- Died: AD 38 (aged 57 or 58)

Military service
- Allegiance: Roman Empire
- Years of service: 31–38
- Rank: Praetorian prefect
- Unit: Praetorian Guard

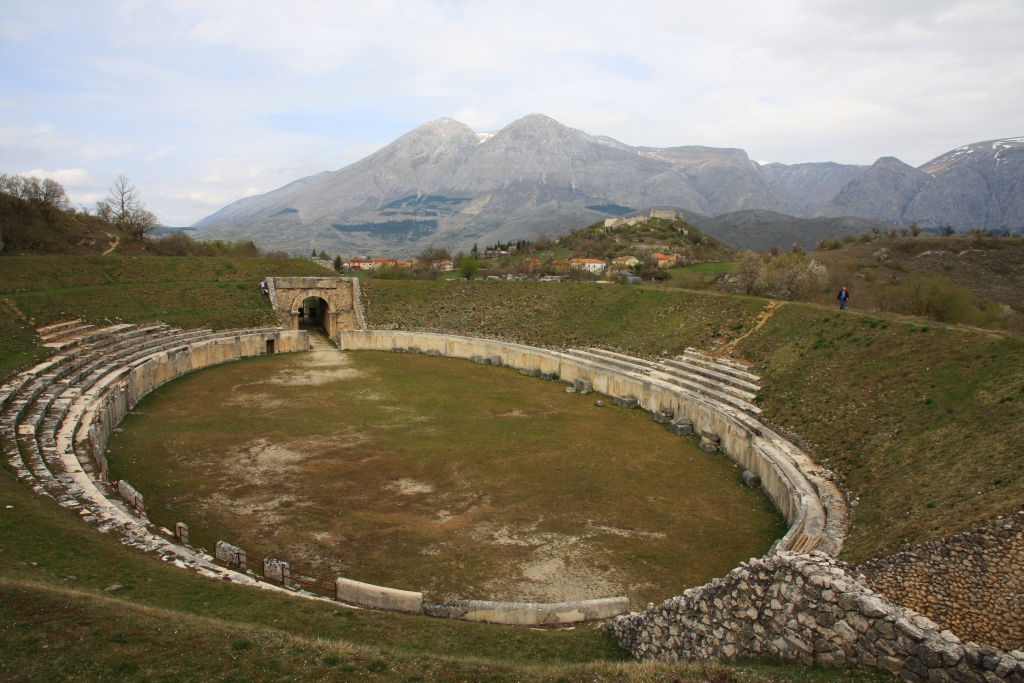
Ruins of the amphitheater of Alba Fucens, Macro’s birthplace

Quintus Naevius Cordus Sutorius Macro (21 BC – AD 38) was a prefect of the Praetorian Guard, from 31 until 38, serving under the Roman Emperors Tiberius and Caligula. Upon falling out of favour, he killed himself.

== Biography ==
Macro was born in 21 BC at Alba Fucens, a Roman town at the foot of Monte Velino, situated on a hill just to the north of the Via Valeria in Italy. Inscriptional evidence from the ruins of this town reveal that, prior to becoming Praetorian prefect, Macro had served as praefectus vigilum, prefect of the vigiles, the Roman fire brigade and night watch. The date of this appointment and the length of his tenure are unknown.

Macro was appointed Praetorian prefect by Tiberius after the arrest of Sejanus. According to Tacitus, Macro was active in discrediting Sejanus and in directing the subsequent purge against his family and followers. As prefect, Macro wielded considerable influence. He furthered his ambitions by befriending Tiberius' grand-nephew Caligula, one of the Emperor's prospective heirs. According to Suetonius, Macro gained further favour by turning a blind eye to his wife Ennia Thrasylla's affair with Caligula, around the year 34.

When Tiberius died in the year 37, Macro sided with the new emperor Caligula. According to Tacitus, Macro even played a role in bringing about Caligula's rise to power, by ordering Tiberius to be killed after it was revealed that reports of his death had been premature: Caligula had begun to take power immediately upon hearing that Tiberius had died of natural causes but without making sure that Tiberius was dead. Tiberius was still alive and, shortly after, was heard calling for food. In order to prevent an embarrassing and potentially dangerous situation, should Tiberius have reacted angrily to Caligula's hasty ascension to power, Macro "ordered the old Emperor to be smothered under a huge heap of clothes."

Macro was confident of rapid promotion for past services but Emperor Caligula was aware of the potential threat Macro posed and soon removed him from office. According to some sources, Macro was promised the governorship of Egypt but upon arriving at Ostia with Ennia to take ship, he was instead arrested and stripped of his office. Macro committed suicide soon after. Macro was able to leave enough money to provide an amphitheatre for his home town of Alba Fucens.

== Modern depictions ==
- In the 1954 film, Demetrius and the Gladiators, he was played by Karl (Killer) Davis
- In the 1968 ITV Granada-TV production The Caesars, Jerome Willis played the part of Macro.
- John Rhys-Davies played him in the 1976 BBC serial I, Claudius.
- Guido Mannari portrays Macro in Caligula.
- In Francesco Vezzoli's fake promotional video, Trailer for a Remake of Gore Vidal's "Caligula", he was played by Benicio del Toro.
- In the 2017 American docu-drama miniseries Roman Empire, Macro is portrayed by Michael Morris in season 3.
- In the 2018 book The Burning Maze, Macro appears as the owner of military surplus store with automaton employees.

Political offices
Preceded by Aulus Avilius Flaccus	Prefect of Egypt circa 38	Succeeded by Gaius Vitrasius Pollio
Preceded by Lucius Aelius Sejanus	Praetorian prefect 31–38	Succeeded by Marcus Arrecinus Clemens, and Lucius Arruntius Stella
