= Commitment =

Commitment(s) or The Commitment(s) may refer to:

== Film, television, and theater ==
- Commitment (2013 film), a South Korean film directed by Park Hong-soo
- Commitment (2019 film), a Turkish film directed by Semih Kaplanoğlu
- Commitments (film), a 2001 American television film
- The Commitment (film), a 2014 Filipino film directed by Joselito Altarejos
- The Commitments (film), a 1991 adaptation of the Roddy Doyle novel (see below)
- The Commitments (musical), a 2013 stage musical adaptation of the Roddy Doyle novel
- "Commitment", a season 3 episode of Servant (TV series)

== Music ==
=== Albums ===
- Commitment (Bobby Darin album), 1969
- Commitment (Craig David album), 2025
- Commitment (Harold Vick album) or the title song, 1974
- Commitment (Jim Hall album), 1976
- Commitment (Lucky Boys Confusion album) or the title song, 2003
- Commitment (Michael Wong album) or the title song, 2006
- Commitment (Seal album), 2010
- The Commitment (EP), by Cadet, or the title song, 2016

=== Songs ===
- "Commitment" (LeAnn Rimes song), 1998
- "Commitment" (Monica song), 2019

== Other uses ==
- The Commitment: Love, Sex, Marriage, and My Family, a 2005 book by Dan Savage
- The Commitments (novel), a 1987 novel by Roddy Doyle
- Committed relationship
- Commitment scheme, a cryptographic scheme that allows commitment to a chosen value
- Promise, a commitment by someone to do or not do something
- Involuntary commitment, detainment in a mental hospital due to symptoms of severe mental disorder

== See also ==
- Commit (disambiguation)
- Committed (disambiguation)
- The Commitments (disambiguation)
