= Domitia Lepida =

Mother of Roman empress Messalina

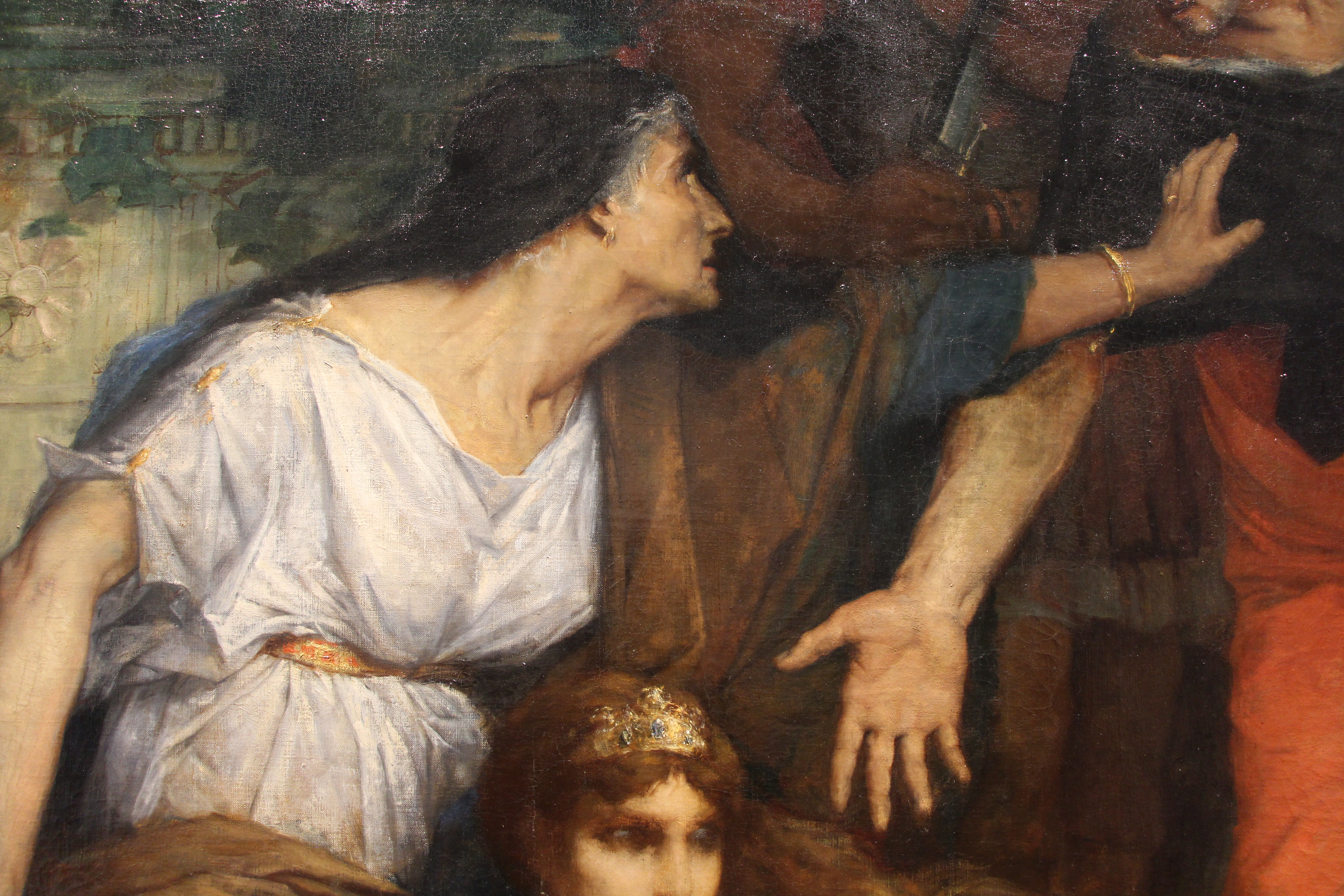
- Domitia Lepida depicted trying to shield her daughter Messalina. The Death of Messalina by Fernand Lematte, 1870
- Born: c. 5 BC
- Died: 54 AD (aged c. 59)
- Spouse(s): Marcus Valerius Messalla Barbatus; Faustus Cornelius Sulla; Appius Junius Silanus
- Children: Valeria Messalina; Faustus Cornelius Sulla Felix; Marcus Junius Silanus
- Parents: Lucius Domitius Ahenobarbus (father); Antonia Major (mother)

Domitia Lepida (c. 5 BC – AD 54) was a Roman aristocrat, related to the imperial family. She was mother of Valeria Messalina, wife of the Emperor Claudius. Lepida was a beautiful and influential figure. Like her sister, she was also very wealthy. She had holdings in Calabria and owned the praedia Lepidiana.

== Biography ==
Lepida was the daughter of Antonia Major and Lucius Domitius Ahenobarbus, and granddaughter to triumvir Mark Antony by Octavia Minor, a great-niece of the Roman Emperor Augustus. She had two siblings: Domitia and Gnaeus Domitius Ahenobarbus (consul AD 32).

Lepida was married three times. Her first husband was her cousin, Marcus Valerius Messalla Barbatus. Lepida married Barbatus probably around AD 15, suggesting that she was born in approximately 4 BC. It was standard for princesses in the imperial family to marry before their 18th birthday. They had a daughter, Valeria Messalina (c. AD 17/20-48), who became Empress and third wife to the Emperor Claudius. Barbatus most likely died around AD 20 or 21, shortly after Messalina was born. It is extremely unlikely that Marcus Valerius Messalla Corvinus was their son, since Lepida's son by her second husband reached the consulship earlier than Messalla. Lepida's second husband was Faustus Cornelius Sulla, consul in AD 31, a descendant of the dictator Lucius Cornelius Sulla. Their son, Faustus Cornelius Sulla Felix was born c. AD 22 and married Claudia Antonia, the daughter of Claudius through his second marriage to Aelia Paetina. Faustus Cornelius Sulla died in 62.

At the beginning of the reign of her son-in-law, Claudius, Lepida, now a widow, married Appius Junius Silanus, (cos. AD 28). In the following year (AD 42), Silanus was put to death by Claudius, allegedly because he had plotted to assassinate Claudius, but the rumor circulated that Messalina had framed him after he resisted her advances.

Lepida was the maternal grandmother to Messalina's children Claudia Octavia (step-sister and first wife of Nero) and Britannicus. In AD 48, Messalina was executed on the orders of Claudius, due to Messalina's mock marriage with her lover Gaius Silius which swiftly evolved into a failed coup d'état. During Messalina's heyday, Lepida argued with Messalina and they became estranged (this likely followed Appius Silanus' execution). In Messalina's last hour in the Gardens of Lucullus, Lepida was at her side and encouraged her to end her own life. After Messalina was stabbed with a dagger by an officer, her body was given up to Lepida.

Lepida's former sister-in-law, Agrippina the Younger, became Claudius' new wife in AD 49. Out of jealousy, Agrippina arranged the execution of Lepida sometime before the poisoning of Claudius, after which Nero became the new emperor. Agrippina charged Lepida with attempting to take her life by magic, disturbing Roman peace, and failing to control her Calabrian slave-gangs. Agrippina thought that Lepida would use her 'kind' influence on Nero to turn him against his mother.

== Cultural depictions ==
She was played by Moira Redmond in the 1976 BBC TV series I, Claudius.

== See also ==
- List of Roman women
- Women in ancient Rome
