= The Death of Messalina =

Painting by Fernand Lematte

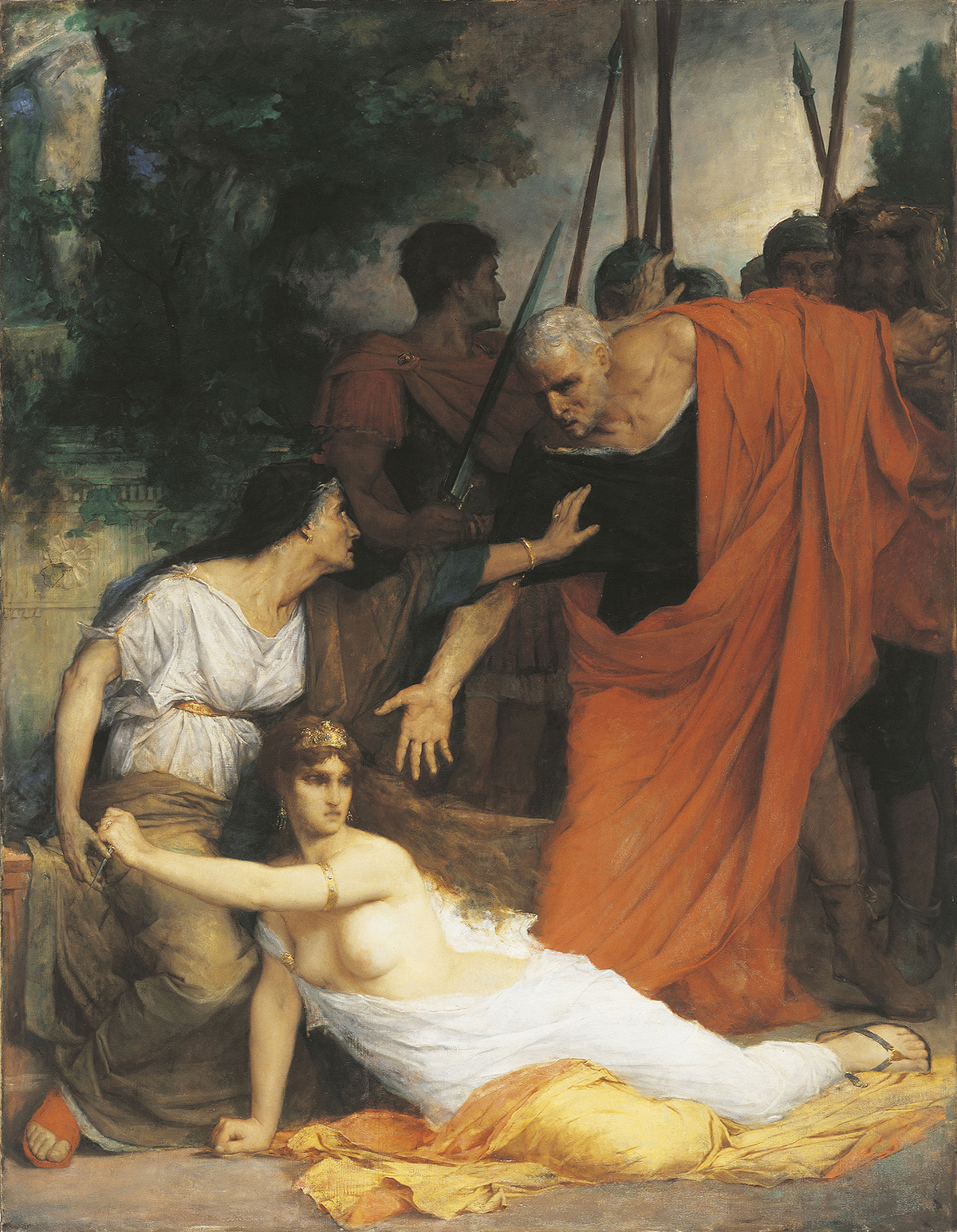
- Artist: Fernand Lematte
- Year: 1870
- Dimensions: 145 cm (57 in) × 113 cm (44 in)
- Location: Beaux-Arts de Paris, France
- Accession No.: PRP 121

The Death of Messalina is an 1870 oil on canvas painting by Fernand Lematte, now in the Beaux-Arts de Paris with the inventory number PRP 121 / MU 3004 de Paris.

== History ==
The death of Claudius's wife Messalina in the Gardens of Lucullus (as reported by Tacitus) was the subject set for candidates for the Prix de Rome in 1870. The historian relates that her killing was a hurried affair, ordered by the Emperor's freedman Narcissus when Claudius showed himself inclined to mercy. "Evodus, [another] of the freedmen, was appointed to watch and complete the affair. Hurrying on before with all speed to the gardens, he found Messalina stretched upon the ground, while by her side sat Lepida, her mother, who, though estranged from her daughter in prosperity, was now melted to pity by her inevitable doom, and urged her not to wait for the executioner."

Lematte, the winner of the competition, depicts Messalina with a thin dagger in her hand that she dare not use. She is turning away from Evodus as he bends over her, "overwhelming her with the copious insults of a servile tongue", in the words of Tacitus, while Lepida tries to fend him off. In the shadows behind the group are soldiers, one of whom has unsheathed his sword in order to run Messalina through in accordance with what he believes is the imperial sentence of death.

The painting was more recently exhibited at the Musée des Beaux-Arts de Lyon's 2018–2019 exhibition Claude, un empereur au destin singulier (the singular destiny of the Emperor Claudius).

Details

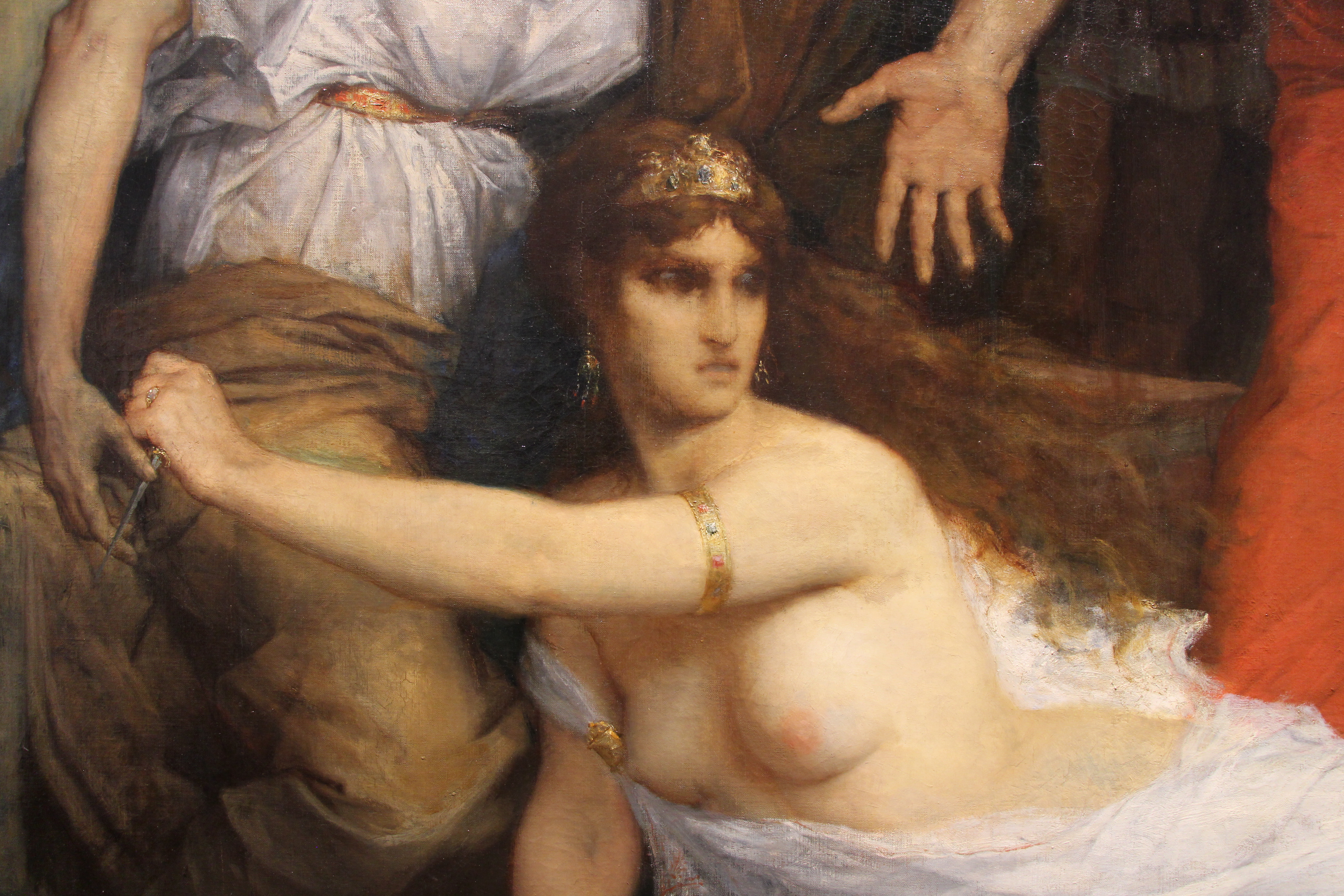
Messalina holding a dagger

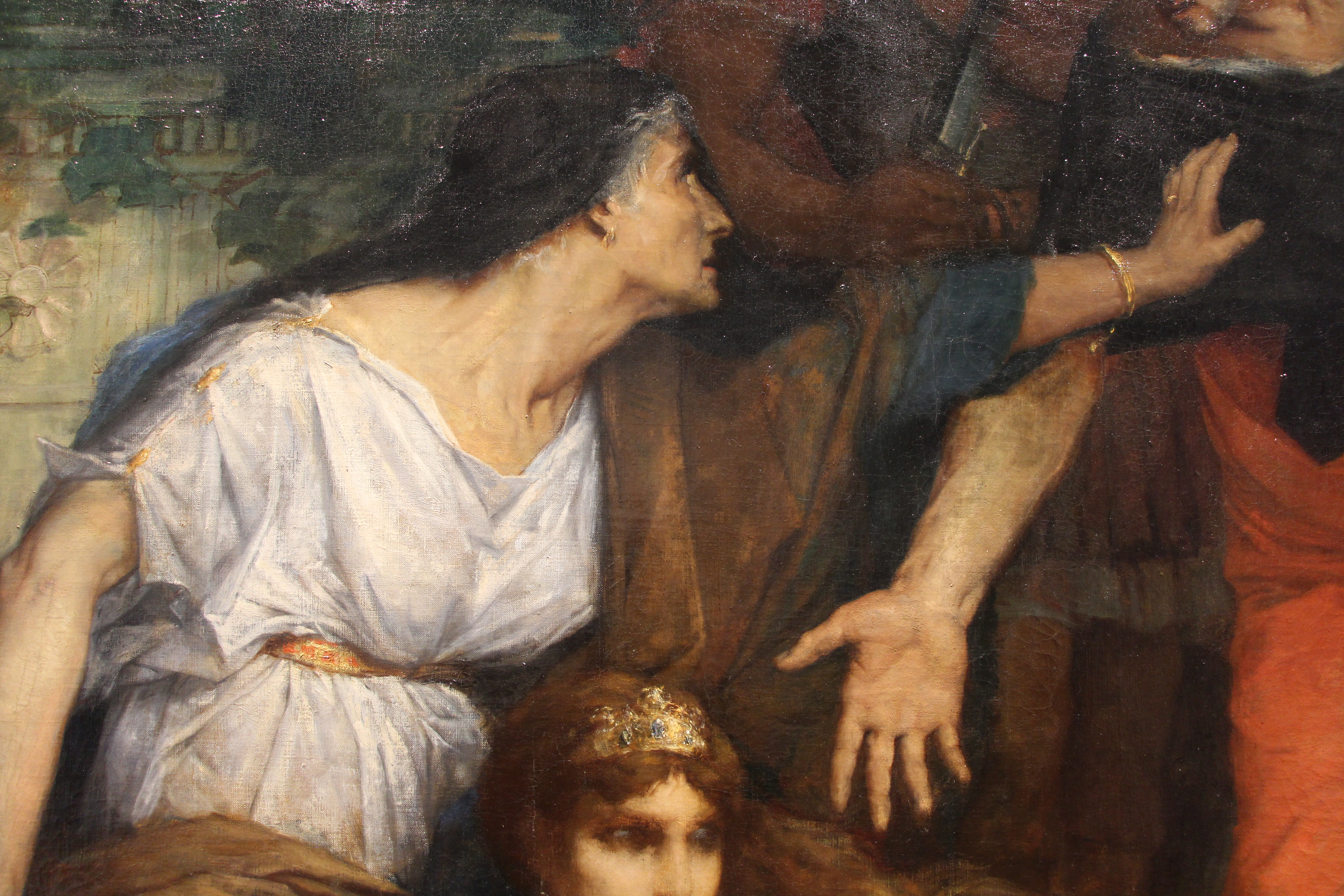
Her mother pushing away Evodus

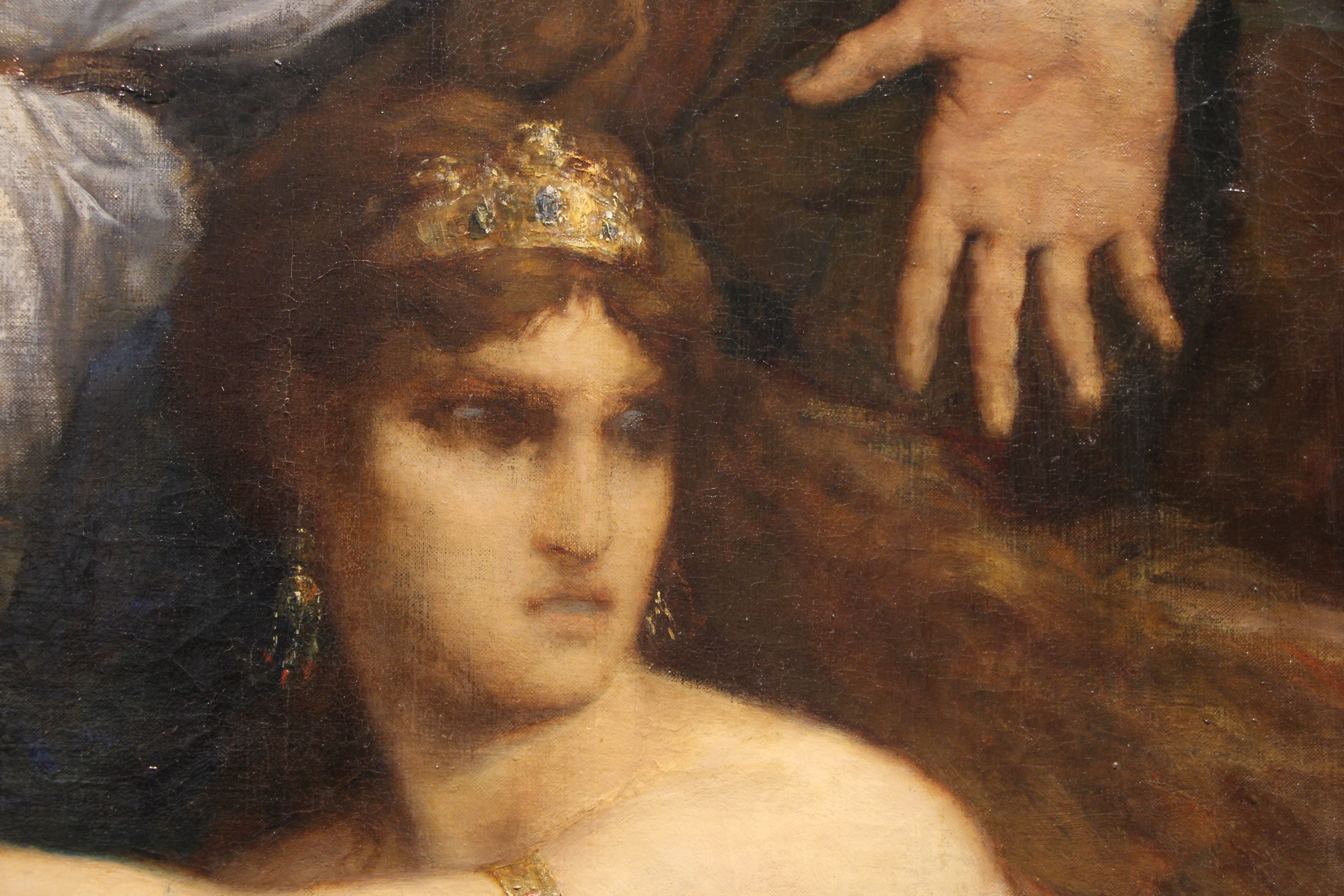
Messalina's averted face
