= Appius Junius Silanus =

First century Roman senator, consul and provincial governor

Appius Junius Silanus (died AD 43), whom Cassius Dio calls Gaius Appius Silanus, was consul in AD 28, with Publius Silius Nerva as his colleague. He was accused of majestas, or treason, in AD 32 along with a number of senators, but he and Gaius Calvisius Sabinus were saved by one of the informers, Celsus, a tribune of a city cohort.

Shortly after the accession of Claudius, in AD 41, when Silanus was governor of Hispania Tarraconensis, he was recalled to Rome and married to Domitia Lepida Minor, mother of the empress Messalina. He was treated with the greatest of distinction, but having refused the advances of Messalina herself, he was soon put to death by the emperor. Messalina and Tiberius Claudius Narcissus accused him of plotting to assassinate Claudius, and claimed that they had seen Silanus attempting to murder the emperor in their dreams.

Silanus' relationship to the other Junii Silani is uncertain. According to Ronald Syme, he, the Decimus Junius Silanus who had an affair with Julia the Younger, and Marcus Junius Silanus who was consul in AD 15, were the sons of Gaius Junius Silanus, consul in AD 10. He is sometimes confused with Marcus Junius Silanus Torquatus, consul in AD 19. Although Syme claims his marriage to Domitia was childless, Judith Ginsburg identifies Silanus as the father of Marcus Junius Silanus, suffect consul in either 54 or 55. If this identification is correct, Marcus was almost certainly a son from a previous marriage, as a consul in 54 or 55 cannot have been born as late as 41 AD.

== In television ==
The 1976 television version of I, Claudius shows him carrying out an actual assassination attempt on Claudius with a dagger, and coming close to succeeding. He was played by Lyndon Brook.

== See also ==
- Junii Silani
- List of Roman consuls

== Bibliography ==
- Publius Cornelius Tacitus, Annales.
- Gaius Suetonius Tranquillus, De Vita Caesarum (Lives of the Caesars, or The Twelve Caesars).
- Lucius Cassius Dio Cocceianus, Roman History.
- Dictionary of Greek and Roman Biography and Mythology, William Smith, ed., Little, Brown and Company, Boston (1849).
- Alison E. Cooley, The Cambridge Manual of Latin Epigraphy, Cambridge University Press (2012).
- Ronald Syme, The Augustan Aristocracy, Clarendon Press (1989).

Political offices
| Preceded by Publius Cornelius Lentulus and Gaius Sallustius Crispus Passienus as Suffect consuls | Consul of the Roman Empire; 28 with Publius Silius Nerva | Succeeded by Lucius Junius Silanus and Gaius Vellaeus Tutor as Suffect consuls |
