= I Love N.Y. (1987 film) =

- Directed by: Gianni Bozzacchi (Note: Credited as Alan Smithee.)
- Written by: Gianni Bozzacchi (as Alan Smithee)
- Produced by: Andrew W. Garroni; Gianni Bozzacchi
- Starring: Scott Baio; Christopher Plummer
- Cinematography: Armando Nannuzzi
- Edited by: Roberto Silvi
- Music by: Bill Conti
- Production company: Manhattan Films
- Release date: May 4, 1987 (Cannes Film Festival)
- Running time: 100 minutes
- Country: United States
- Language: English
- Budget: $7 million

I Love N.Y. is a 1987 American semi-autobiographical comedy-drama film written and directed by fine-art photographer Gianni Bozzacchi as Alan Smithee.

== Plot ==
Mario Cotone is an American-Italian struggling photographer who meets and falls in love with Nicole Yeats, a pretty young debutante and the daughter of stage actor John R. Yeats.

== Cast ==
- Scott Baio as Mario Cotone
- Kelly Van der Velden as Nicole Yeats
- Christopher Plummer as John Robertson Yeats
- Jennifer O'Neill as Irene
- Virna Lisi as Anna Cotone, Mario's mother
- Jerry Orbach as Leo
- John Armstead as Charlie
- Lisanne Falk as Linda
- Jusak Bernhard as Kem
- Morgan Most as Veronica (credited as Morgan Hart)
- Cyrus Elias as Kurt Thompson
- Mickey Knox as Charles Mitchell
- Penny Brown as Katherine Mitchell
- John Karlsen as The Butler
- Larry Dolgin as The Mayor
