= Committed =

Committed may refer to:

== Media ==
- Committed, a 1992 album by the Jamaican reggae fusion band Third World
- Committed (comic strip), an American comic strip written and drawn by Michael Fry
- Committed (vocal group), an a cappella group of six male vocalists from Huntsville, Alabama
- Committed: A Skeptic Makes Peace with Marriage, a 2010 book written by Elizabeth Gilbert

=== Film ===
- Committed, a 1984 film created by Sheila McLaughlin
- Committed (1991 film), a film starring Jennifer O'Neill
- Committed (2000 film), a film directed and written by Lisa Krueger
- Committed, a 2014 Cypriot film by Stelana Kliris
- Committed: The Toronto International Film Festival, a 2010 one-hour documentary by Morgan Spurlock

=== Television ===
- "Committed" (CSI episode), a 2005 episode of the TV series CSI: Crime Scene Investigation
- "Committed" (Helstrom), an episode of Helstrom
- Committed, a 2011 television film starring Andrea Roth
- Committed (American TV series), an American television sitcom that aired on NBC
- Committed (Canadian TV series), a 2001 animated television series based on the comic strip

== Other ==
- Committed (horse) (1980–2009), American-bred, Irish-trained Thoroughbred racehorse and broodmare
- "Committed", a song by the Newsboys from Love Riot, 2016
- "Committed", a song by Rauw Alejandro and Pharrell Williams from Cosa Nuestra, 2024

== See also ==
- Commitment (disambiguation)
