= The Flower in His Mouth =

1975 Italian drama film by Luigi Zampa

- Theatrical release poster by Renato Casaro
- Directed by: Luigi Zampa
- Written by: Leonardo Benvenuti; Piero De Bernardi; Giuseppe Fava
- Produced by: Zev Braun; Carlo Ponti
- Starring: Jennifer O'Neill; Franco Nero; James Mason; Orazio Orlando; Claudio Gora; Franco Fabrizi; Carla Calò; Gino Pagnani; Gigi Bonos; Aldo Giuffrè
- Cinematography: Ennio Guarnieri
- Edited by: Franco Fraticelli
- Music by: Ennio Morricone
- Production company: Compagnia Cinematografica Champion
- Release date: 1975
- Running time: 113 minutes
- Country: Italy
- Language: Italian

The Flower in His Mouth (Italian: Gente di rispetto) is a 1975 Italian drama film directed by Luigi Zampa and starring Franco Nero, Jennifer O'Neill and James Mason.

== Plot ==
Teacher Elena Bardi transfers herself from Sondrio in a Sicilian town, where she is harassed by a man without anyone intervening. The next morning he is found executed. Elena finds lodging with a lawyer named Bellocampo, who is an enigmatic landowner who knows all the unmentionable secrets of the city. At school Elena clashes with the difficulties of school evasion, while her non-conformism prevents her from tying up with her colleagues, except with Professor Belcore, with whom she starts a relationship, which he does not dare to make public. One day Bellocampo leads her to the poor neighborhoods of the city where school evasion originates and informs her that the degradation could be eliminated with the approval of a law firm in Parliament.

When she is the victim of a second aggression whose executioners are also found dead, Elena realizes that everyone thinks she has a mysterious power. Although concerned by this notion, she decides to use it to ask the Mayor to bestow grants to the poorest families, which he immediately obtains. The consideration towards her increases so much that now everyone sends their children to school. She also meets the powerful Senator Cataudella and asks him to unblock the law for the rehabilitation of poor neighborhoods, which happens a short time later.

Nevertheless, a journalist tells her that in reality only a portion of the law was approved to intervene in areas that involve a speculation from Bellocampo. Faced with Elena's indignation, he tells her to hate the city because they killed his brother when he was a podestà. Elena realizes that she has been used, and even Belcore ends up being so cowardly. She then decides to leave, but the morning of departure does not go on the bus that would take her away.

== Cast ==
- Jennifer O'Neill as Elena Bardi
- Franco Nero as Professore Belcore
- James Mason as Bellocampo
- Orazio Orlando as Ispettore
- Aldo Giuffrè as Maresciallo
- Claudio Gora as Deputate Cataudella
- Luigi Bonos as Canaino
- Carla Calò
- Gino Pagnani as Profumo
- Franco Fabrizi as Dottore Sanguedolce
