= Eugène Cyrille Brunet =

French sculptor (1828-1921)

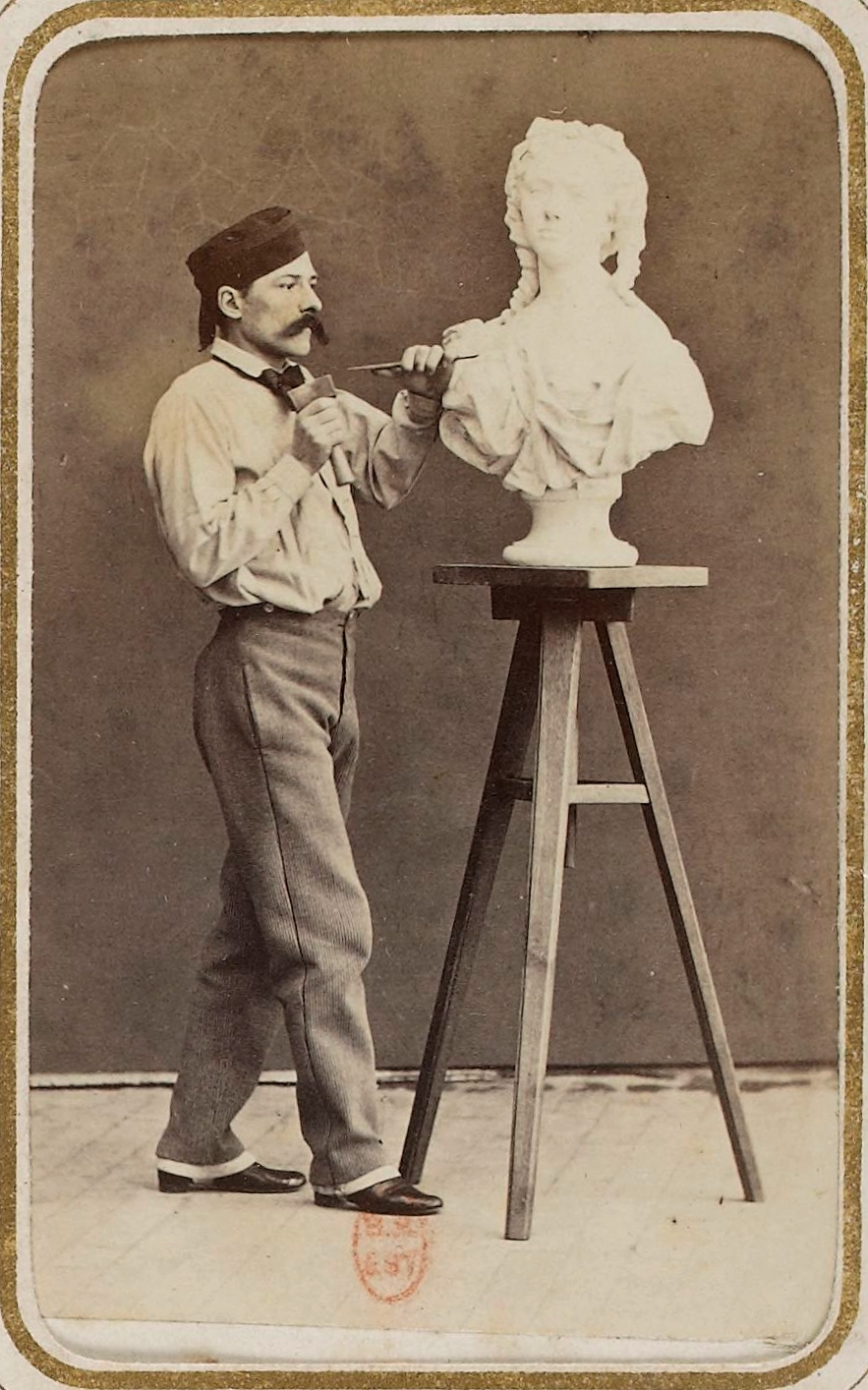
Eugène Cyrille Brunet (ca. 1875)

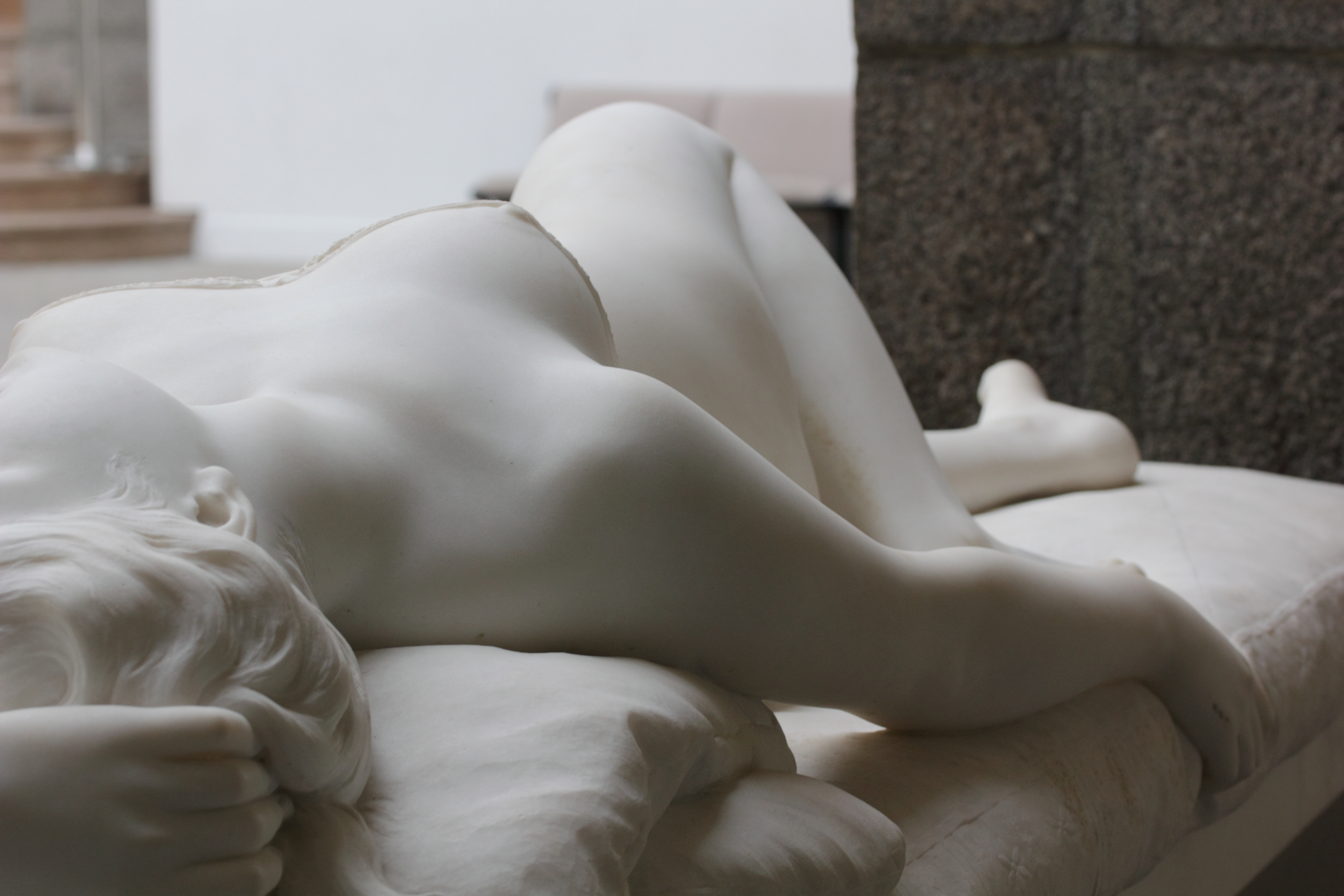
Messalina, detail

Eugène Cyrille Brunet was a French sculptor, born in Sarcelles in 1828 to André Brunet and Aglaé-Julie Drouet. He died in 1921. Brunet studied under Armand Toussaint at the École des beaux-arts. There he met Édouard Manet and the two made a study trip to Florence in 1857. In October 1861 he married Caroline de Pène, who was painted by Manet about that time. A mustached head and shoulders of the artist himself appears looking to one side in the left background of Manet's La Musique aux Tuileries (1862). In Manet's address book he is recorded as living in Brittany.

A sculptor of Classical subjects, Brunet is best known for his sensuous marble statue of the recumbent Messalina, exhibited at the 1884 Salon.
