= Commit =

Commit may refer to:

== Computing ==
=== Databases ===
- Commit (data management), a set of permanent changes in a database
- COMMIT (SQL), an SQL statement used to create such a changeset

=== Version control ===
- Changeset, list of differences between two successive versions in a repository
- Commit (version control), the operation of committing such a changeset to the repository

=== Microsoft Windows ===
- Commit charge, a concept in operating system-level memory management

== Others ==
- Materiel and IT Command (COMMIT), the defense procurement agency of the government of The Netherlands
- Commit (motion), a parliamentary motion
- Nicotine replacement therapy, by the trade name Commit
- Commit (card game), a 19th century American variant of the French card game, Comet

== See also ==
- Commitment (disambiguation)
