= The Stars from the Commitments =

Touring band members part-reprising their roles from a 1991 film

The Stars From The Commitments is a nine-piece Dublin based soul band, featuring original cast members and musicians from the BAFTA Winner, Golden Globe & Oscar nominated Sir Alan Parker film The Commitments and multimillion selling sound track.

== History of the band ==
The band was formed shortly after the release of the film, which itself was based on the Roddy Doyle novel of the same name. Since 1993 The Stars From The Commitments have toured extensively across Canada, USA, South America, Europe, Scandinavia, Africa, Asia and Australia.

Original Cast members: guitarist Kenneth McCluskey Aka Derek "The Meat Man" Scully, Piano Player Michael Aherne Aka "Steven The Soul Surgeon" Clifford, Ronan Dooney, Trumpet. The following members: Plus Sean Curtis (lead vocals), Andreas Nolan (bass), Sandra Hyland and Antoinette Dunleavy (lead & backing vocals), Abraham Hampton (keyboards & Organ), Carl Cliffton (Drums) and Serge Stavila – Saxophone, joined later. Their open air concert at the Party in the Park in São Paulo, Brazil were attended by over 100,000 people where they were performing with blues guitarist and singer B. B. King. The soundtracks to the Alan Parker film such as In The Midnight Hour, Try a Little Tenderness and Mustang Sally have sold over 12 million copies.

The original members of the group Dick Massey and Kenneth McCluskey have formed their own band called "The Commitments".

After the film's success Andrew Strong, the lead singer, performed with Elton John, Bryan Adams, Ray Charles and The Rolling Stones, and signed a solo record deal with MCA Records. He continued touring and lives in Denmark.

== Discography ==
List of albums
Year	Title	Recording company
1991	The Commitments (Original Motion Picture Soundtrack)	MCA Records
1992	The Commitments Vol. 2 (Music From The Original Motion Picture Soundtrack)	MCA Records
1995	The Commitments Vol. 2 (Music From The Original Motion Picture Soundtrack) (CD, Album, RP)	MCA Records, Altaya

Singles & EPs
Year	Title	Recording company	Notes
1991	I Never Loved A Man / In The Midnight Hour	MCA Records, Beacon Records	
1991	Destination Anywhere / I Can't Stand The Rain	MCA Records, Beacon Records	
1991	Try A Little Tenderness	MCA Records	
1991	Mustang Sally	MCA Records	
1991	Bye Bye Bye / Slip Away	MCA Records, Beacon Records	
1991	The Dark End Of The Street / Chain Of Foo	MCA Records, Beacon Records	
1991	Treat Her Right	MCA Records	
1991	Treat Her Right (CD, Single, Promo)	MCA Records	COM 1
1991	Medley (CD, Single, Promo)\\	MCA Records	CD45 2107
1992	Hard To Handle	MCA Records	
Unknown	I Never Loved A Man / Slip Away (7")	Collectables, MCA Special Markets & Products	COL-90077, MSS-35704
Unknown	Chain Of Fools / Treat Her Right (7", RE)	Collectables, MCA Special Markets & Products	COL-90119, MSS-35865

== See also ==
- The Commitments
