= Lady Ice =

1973 film by Tom Gries

- Theatrical release poster by Ron Lesser
- Directed by: Tom Gries
- Written by: Harold Clemens; Alan Trustman
- Produced by: Harrison Starr
- Starring: Donald Sutherland; Jennifer O'Neill; Robert Duvall
- Cinematography: Lucien Ballard
- Edited by: William Sands; Robert Swink
- Music by: Perry Botkin Jr.
- Production company: Tomorrow Entertainment
- Distributed by: National General Pictures
- Release date: July 13, 1973
- Running time: 94 min
- Country: United States
- Language: English
- Budget: $3 million

Lady Ice is a 1973 American crime film directed by Tom Gries, and starring Donald Sutherland, Jennifer O'Neill and Robert Duvall. The story concerns an insurance investigator who becomes involved with a wealthy young woman he suspects of fencing stolen jewelry.

== Plot ==
In a Miami hotel room, insurance agent Andy Hammon surprises Tony Lacava, a jewelry fence, at gunpoint and retrieves a diamond necklace that Lacava had concealed under his clothes.

While working at a garage, Hammon encounters Paula Booth, a wealthy young woman who leaves her car to be repaired. He makes a lewd comment toward Paula and is summoned to see the garage owner, Booth's father, who fires him. Hammon steals Paula's car and she pursues him until she loses him at a draw bridge. Later, at her home, Paula encounters Hammon again, who presents himself as criminal and proposes a partnership. Hammon later shows her the necklace that he took from Lacava. Paula reports the encounter to her father.

Department of Justice official Ford Pierce shows Hammon the body of Lacava, who has been killed, and reveals that Paula, her father Paul and their partner Eddie are all under investigation as Booth senior has a large amount of unexplained wealth. Eddie tells Paula he thinks Hammon is a threat to a future deal worth $3 million and suggests killing him, but Paula protests. Hammon is attacked in his home by the thugs who killed Lacava, but they leave when Paula arrives. Hammon reveals to Paula that he is an insurance investigator from Chicago and he knows that a further shipment of jewelry is arriving soon.

In Chicago, a jewelry store is robbed. Pierce and his agents separately follow Eddie and Paula but lose both of them. Hammon, however, successfully follows Paula to a meeting with Eddie and the Chicago robbers, where they buy the stolen jewelry, and eventually to Nassau. Hammon meets with Paula and her contact, Brinker, and offers them $500,000 for the jewels. Hammon deduces that the stolen gems are being recut and sold as new jewelry items. Brinker collects the jewelry, but he is robbed by a gang hired by Hammon and claims the insurance money for the jewels.

Hammon's employers meet him in the Bahamas and tell him to obtain a signed statement from Paula, stating that the recut jewels are the same as the stolen ones. Hammon meets Paula to negotiate the deal and offers her $600,000 and immunity from prosecution. Paula accepts, and they depart to retrieve the jewels but Eddie arrives and takes them for himself. The police pursue Eddie as Hammon and Paula look on.

== Cast ==
- Donald Sutherland as Andy Hammon
- Jennifer O'Neill as Paula Booth
- Robert Duvall as Ford Pierce
- Patrick Magee as Mr. Booth
- Jon Cypher as Eddie
- Eric Braeden as Brinker
- Perry Lopez as Carlos

== Production ==
The movie was made by a company called Tomorrow Entertainment, a subsidiary of General Electric. Tomorrow specialised in television production but had moved into features with Lady Caroline Lamb. The film was based on an original script by Alan Trustman called The Master. Richard Colla was the first director announced.

Terrence Malick wrote a version of the script. His agent, Mike Medavoy, sold for $50,000 to help finance his first film, Badlands. Malick chose to go uncredited on Lady Ice.

George Lucas was offered the chance to direct but he turned it down in favor of focusing on finding a studio for American Graffiti.

Filming started in Miami with Donald Sutherland and Susan George in the leads. Filming was chaotic. The first director was fired. A second director was brought on - original choice of Harrison Starr, the producer - but he insisted on stopping the production and rewriting the script which Tomorrow refused to do so so he quit. $500,000 was spent before the film was shut down. Tom Gries said he read the script Friday, agreed to do it Saturday and flew to Miami to work on Monday. Filming started two days later. Gries replaced the original female lead Susan George with Jennifer O'Neill.

The original budget was $1.5 million but it blew out to $3 million.

== Reception ==
Leonard Maltin awarded the film two stars.

== See also ==
- List of American films of 1973
