= Committed (1991 film) =

- Directed by: William A. Levy
- Screenplay by: Simon Last; Paul Mason
- Based on: Clock and Bell by Susan Claudia
- Produced by: Alan Amiel
- Starring: Jennifer O'Neill
- Cinematography: Hans Kuhle Jr.
- Edited by: Fima Noveck
- Distributed by: Trans World Entertainment
- Release date: April 18, 1991
- Running time: 90 minutes
- Country: United States
- Language: English

This page is about the 1991 film. For other films with the same title, see Committed (disambiguation)

Committed is a 1991 American thriller drama film directed by William A. Levey and starring Jennifer O'Neill. It is based on Susan Claudia’s novel Clock and Bell.

== Cast ==
- Jennifer O'Neill as Susan Manning
- Robert Forster as Dr. Desmond Moore
- William Windom as Dr. Magnus Quilly
- Ron Palillo as Ronnie
- Sydney Lassick as Gow
