= Gaius Vellaeus Tutor =

Roman senator and suffect consul during the reign of Tiberius

Gaius Vellaeus Tutor was a Roman senator, who was active during the reign of Tiberius. He was suffect consul in the second half of 26 as the colleague of Lucius Junius Silanus. The primary event known for their consulship was the promulgation of the Lex Junia Vellae, which concerned how an heir could be disinherited.

Little is known about Tutor, who is the only member of the gens Vellaeus to accede to the consulship, and only a little more about his gens. Less than half a dozen Vellaeii in total are attested: a Publius Vellaeus who in 21 was in command of the army in Thracia; and three freedmen known from inscriptions recorded in Canusium, whose existence suggest Tutor came from that city.

Political offices
Preceded by Gnaeus Cornelius Lentulus Gaetulicus, and Gaius Calvisius Sabinus as ordinary consuls	Suffect consul of the Roman Empire; 26 with Lucius Junius Silanus	Succeeded by Lucius Calpurnius Piso, and Marcus Licinius Crassus Frugi as ordinary consuls
