= The Commitments =

The Commitments may refer to:

- The Commitments (novel), a 1987 novel by Roddy Doyle
- The Commitments (film), a 1991 film adaptation of the book
- The Commitments (musical), 2013 stage musical adaptation of the book
- "The Commitments", a 2000 episode of Spin City
- "The Commitments", a 2008 episode of The Game
- "The Commitments", a 1992 episode of The Golden Girls

== See also ==
- The Stars from the Commitments, tribute band from the film
