= Jennifer O'Neill =

American actress and model (b. 1948)

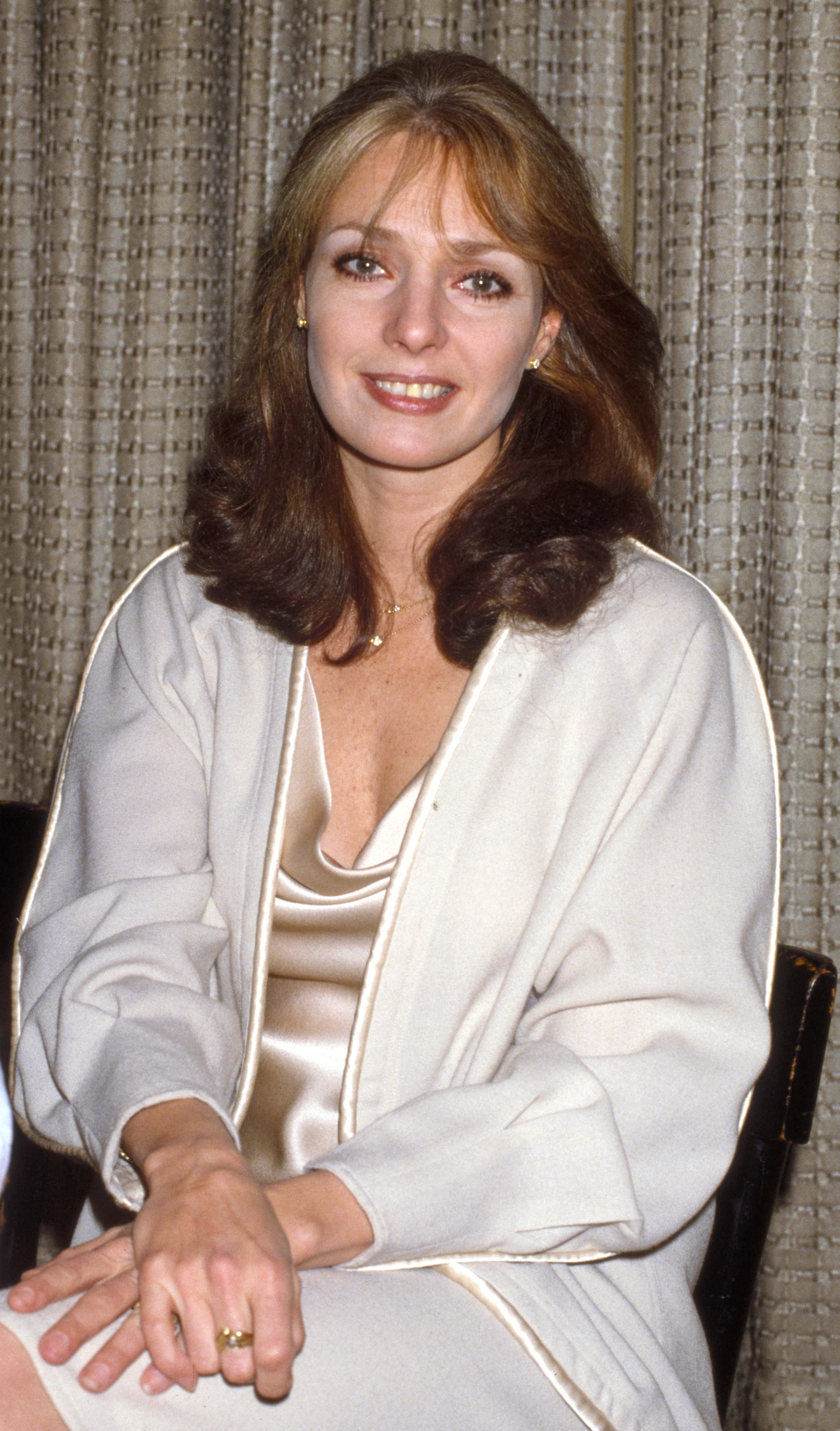
- O'Neill circa 1982
- Born: February 20, 1948 (age 78); Rio de Janeiro, Brazil
- Education: Dalton School
- Occupations: Actress; model; author
- Years active: 1968–present
- Known for: Summer of '42
- Height: 5 ft 8 in (1.73 m)
- Spouses: Deed Rossiter (m. 1965; div. 1971) Joseph Koster (m. 1972; div. 1974) Nick De Noia (m. 1975; div. 1976) Jeff Barry (m. 1978; div. 1979) John Lederer (m. 1979; div. 1983) Richard Alan Brown (m. 1986; div. 1989) (m. 1993; div. 1996) Neil L. Bonin (m. 1992; annul. 1993) Mervin Sidney Louque Jr. (m. 1996)
- Children: 3
- Website: www.jenniferoneill.com

Jennifer O'Neill (born February 20, 1948) is a Brazilian-born American author, model, and actress. After moving to the United States as an infant, she first came to prominence as a teenaged model, and for her spokesperson work for CoverGirl cosmetics, which began in 1963 and spanned three decades. She made her feature-film debut in the comedy film For Love of Ivy (1968), followed by a lead role in Howard Hawks's Western film Rio Lobo (1970).

O'Neill's breakthrough role came in Robert Mulligan's period drama Summer of '42 (1971), in which she portrayed the wife of an army serviceman during World War II who becomes the subject of a teenaged boy's romantic attraction. The same year, she starred in Otto Preminger's Such Good Friends. In the mid-1970s, she appeared in several Italian films, including Luchino Visconti's final feature, The Innocent (1976), and Lucio Fulci's giallo horror film The Psychic (1977). She later starred in David Cronenberg's cult horror film Scanners (1981), and in the short-lived television series Cover Up (1984–1985).

In 1988, O'Neill became a born-again Christian, and inspired by her feelings of regret over having an abortion at age 22, became active in the anti-abortion movement. She is the spokesperson for the Silent No More Awareness Campaign. She has since authored several books, including a memoir, Surviving Myself (1999), in which she detailed her career, marriages, experiences with anxiety and postpartum depression, and her religious faith. O'Neill founded the Hope and Healing at Hillenglade Foundation in Nashville, Tennessee, an equine-assisted therapy foundation that specializes in treating war veterans suffering from post-traumatic stress disorder.

Since the 1990s, O'Neill has occasionally appeared in film and television, including roles in the independent film Doonby (2013) and the Rachel Scott biopic I'm Not Ashamed (2016).

== Early life ==
O'Neill was born on February 20, 1948, in Rio de Janeiro, Brazil, to Irene Freda (née Pope), a native of London, and Oscar Delgado O'Neill, a Brazilian of Portuguese, and Irish ancestry. O'Neill's father, born in Puerto Rico, was a bomber pilot in World War II, and later owned a medical supply company. Her paternal great-grandfather, Oscar O'Neill Sr., was the president of the Bank of Rio de Janeiro. O'Neill's mother, one of seven children, was raised in a "poor but close-knit family."

When she was an infant, she relocated with her family to the United States, where she and her older brother Michael were raised in New Rochelle, New York, and Wilton, Connecticut. O'Neill began riding horses at age 9, and became an accomplished equestrienne, winning upwards of 200 ribbons at horse show competitions in her teens.

At age 14, after her parents informed her the family was relocating to New York City, O'Neill attempted suicide by overdosing on sleeping pills, and fell into a coma for about two weeks. Reflecting on this, she said: "I didn’t want to die, I just wanted to be heard. It was just a rebellion against my parents’ decisions. What seems like a bump in the road as we get older, to a teenager can seem catastrophic... [our moving meant] losing my ability to take care of a horse that I was able to ride. They wouldn't let me take our dog and took her to the pound." In a later interview, O'Neill said she lacked adequate role models as a child, and described her parents as "completely involved with themselves."

== Career ==
=== 1963–1971: Modeling and breakthrough ===
After her family's relocation to New York City, two of O'Neill's neighbors suggested that she model: "That appealed to me, because then I could buy my own horse and no one could take anything away from me again. So I strolled into Eileen Ford’s agency, and she signed me on the spot." By age 15, while attending the prestigious Dalton School in Manhattan, she began appearing on the covers of Vogue, Cosmopolitan, and Seventeen, earning $80,000 ($851,000 today) in 1962. Commenting on O'Neill in 1965, Diana Vreeland said: "O'Neill is a dream. She has great distinction."

O'Neill largely used her modeling income to fund her equestrian endeavors, which afforded her to purchase her own horse, named Alezon. When O'Neill was 15 years old, though, the horse balked before a wall at a horse show, throwing her, causing her to fracture her neck and lower spine in three places. The injury resulted in her suffering lifelong back pain. O'Neill eventually dropped out of the Dalton School at age 17 to wed her first husband, IBM executive Deed Rossiter.

In 1963, O'Neill signed a contract with CoverGirl cosmetics, marking the beginning of a 30-year career as a spokesperson for the company. O'Neill is listed in the Smithsonian Institution's National Museum of American History's Center for Advertising History for her long-standing contract with CoverGirl cosmetics as its model and spokesperson in ads and television commercials.

In 1968, O'Neill landed a small role in the comedy film For Love of Ivy. In 1970, she played her first lead role in the Howard Hawks film Rio Lobo co-starring John Wayne. She had a supporting role in Otto Preminger's Such Good Friends (1971) starring Dyan Cannon and Ken Howard.

In the 1971 film Summer of '42, O'Neill played Dorothy Walker, the early-20s wife of an airman who has gone off to fight in World War II. She stated in a 2002 interview that her agent had to fight to even get a reading for the part, since the role had been cast for an "older woman" to a "coming of age" 15-year-old boy, and the director was only considering actresses over the age of 30. The film was a box-office success and went on to attract a cult following.

=== 1972–1979: Italian films ===
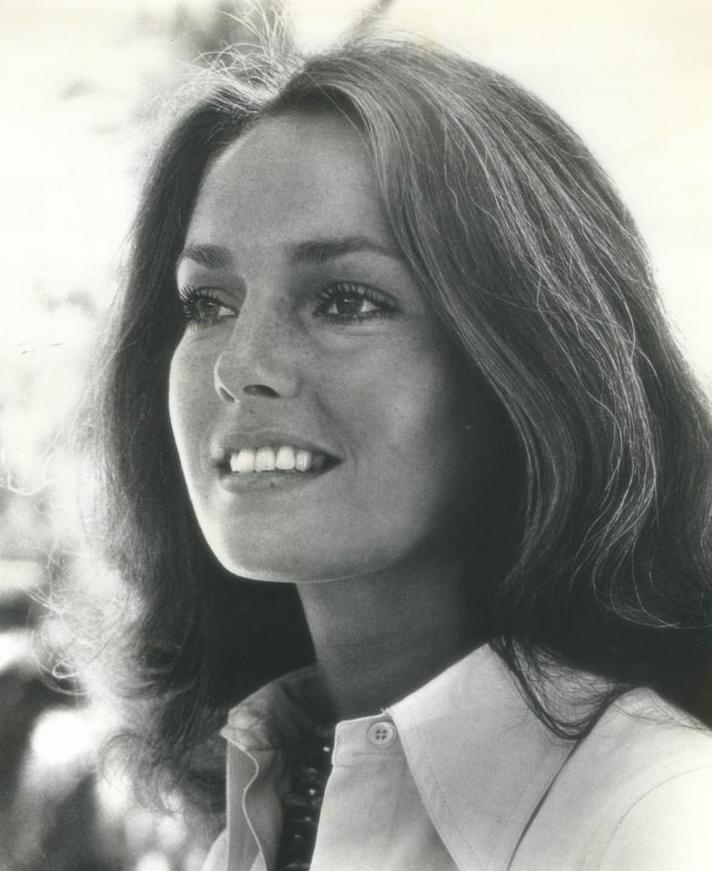
O'Neill in Lady Ice (1973)

In 1972, she co-starred with Tom Jones in David Winters's television special The Special London Bridge Special. The same year, she starred in the crime thriller The Carey Treatment (1972), and the drama Glass Houses, the latter of which was filmed in 1970. This was followed by a lead role in Lady Ice (1973) opposite Donald Sutherland and Robert Duvall.

O'Neill next had a leading role in the psychological horror film The Reincarnation of Peter Proud (1975), co-starring with Michael Sarrazin and Margot Kidder, and directed by J. Lee Thompson. The same year, she appeared opposite Elliott Gould in the Ted Post-directed comedy Whiffs.

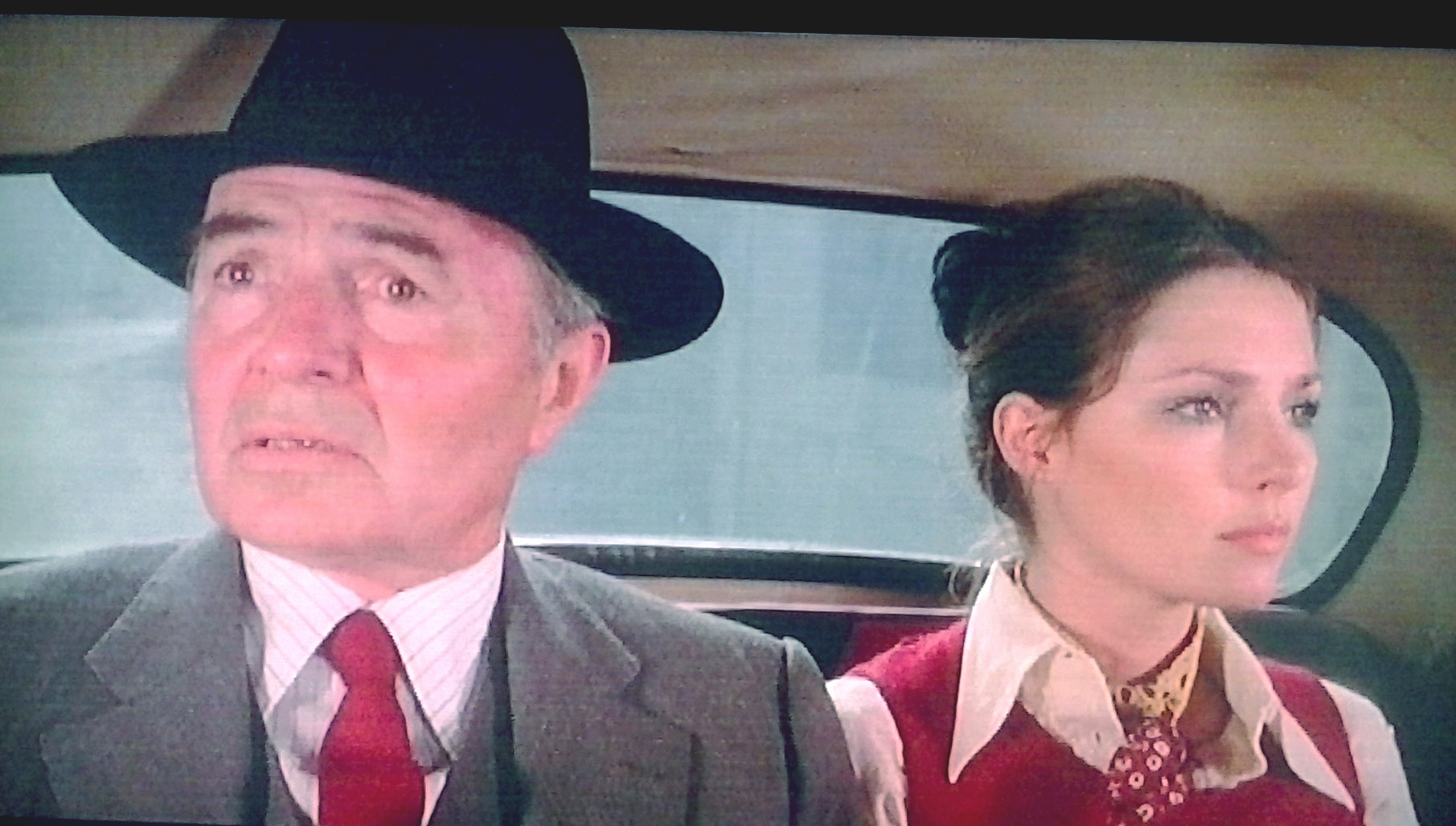
O'Neill and James Mason in The Flower in His Mouth (1975)

By the mid-1970s, O'Neill had forged a career in Italy, first starring in Luigi Zampa's drama The Flower in His Mouth (1975) opposite James Mason, which was shot on location in Sicily. The following year, she starred in Luchino Visconti's final directorial feature, The Innocent, and subsequently starred in Lucio Fulci's The Psychic (1977), portraying a clairvoyant whose visions lead to the discovery of a murder.

She was in the movie Caravans (1978) with Anthony Quinn, Christopher Lee and Michael Sarrazin.

She was originally cast in the Disney film The Black Hole (1979), but was told she needed to cut her hair because it would be easier to film the zero-G scenes. She gave in, drinking wine during the haircut and leaving noticeably impaired. She lost the part after a serious car crash on the way home. O'Neill was instead cast in the action martial arts film A Force of One (1979), co-starring with Chuck Norris.

=== 1980–1990: Subsequent film and television ===
O'Neill starred opposite David Carradine in the aviation-themed drama Cloud Dancer (1980), followed by a lead role in David Cronenberg's science-fiction horror film Scanners (1981), portraying a woman who leads an oppositional group against a malevolent private military company creating biokinetic and psychokinetic humans.

When her movie career slowed, O'Neill took roles in series television. She starred in NBC's short-lived 1982 primetime soap opera Bare Essence and played the lead female role on the 1984 television series Cover Up. On October 12, 1984, Jon-Erik Hexum, O'Neill's co-star in the Cover Up television series, mortally wounded himself on the show's set, unaware that a gun loaded with a blank cartridge could still cause extreme damage from the effect of expanding powder gases. He died six days later.

O'Neill continued to appear in film and television throughout the late 1980s, including in the drama film I Love N.Y. (1987) and in the Perry Mason television film Perry Mason: The Case of the Shooting Star (1986).

=== 1991–present: Later work ===
In 1991, O'Neill starred in the thriller film Committed, portraying a nurse who discovers the fellow staff at the psychiatric hospital where she has been hired are in fact inmates. She later starred opposite James Brolin in The Visual Bible: Acts (1994), which depicts the Acts of the Apostles in the New Testament.

== Personal life ==
O'Neill has been married nine times to eight men (remarrying her sixth husband), and had three children, one each with three of her husbands. After the birth of her first child, Aimee, O'Neill experienced undiagnosed postpartum depression and committed herself to a psychiatric hospital for treatment, which included electroshock therapy.

She was briefly married to Emmy award-winning television producer and choreographer Nick De Noia from 1975 to 1976. De Noia, who also served as O'Neill's manager at the time of their marriage, was a closeted homosexual. In 1987, de Noia was murdered by one of his former associates. O'Neill told journalists that she was "very upset" by the news of his death.

O'Neill's fifth husband, John Lederer, sexually abused her first daughter, Aimee. O'Neill initially disbelieved the accusation after Lederer passed several lie detector tests, and the abuse allegation strained her relationship with her daughter. Reflecting on the abuse in 2019, O'Neill said: "My daughter and I are very close today, but we were in court for a year and I didn't know whom to believe. He passed lie detector tests, so it tore my relationship with her apart. He remarried and did the same thing to his next teenaged stepchild. He was just a masterful liar. When I understood how much she needed me to recognize that she was telling the truth, and she recognized that I didn't have a clue. She was integral in helping bring him to justice. She was so brave, she put a wire on and got him to admit what he'd done."

On October 23, 1982, O'Neill suffered a gunshot wound in her home on McClain Street in Bedford, New York. Police officers who interviewed O'Neill determined that she had accidentally shot herself in the abdomen with a .38 caliber revolver at her 30-acre, 25-room French-style estate while trying to determine if the weapon was loaded. Her husband at the time, John Lederer, was not in the house when the handgun was discharged, but two other people were in the house. Detective Sgt. Thomas Rothwell was quoted as having said that O'Neill "didn't know much about guns." Reflecting on the incident, O'Neill said:

It was an accident ... I hate guns. I believe we all have the right to bear them, but they scare me. I went up to our bedroom and my son was having dinner with the nanny. I noticed that the safe kept in the closet was wide open. When I looked closer, there was [my husband’s] gun lying in a bowl of bullets. I was so furious because my son could have easily reached it. I picked up what turned out to be a 38-caliber and it went off. It shot through my hip and stomach ... But again, God saved my life. I could have been completely paralyzed.

In 1988, O'Neill became a born-again Christian. Commenting on her faith, she said: "I don't want to preach to anybody; I only want to say what happened to me.' In her 1999 autobiography Surviving Myself, O'Neill describes many of her life experiences, including her marriages, career, and her move to her Tennessee farm in the late 1990s. She has said that she wrote the autobiography (her first book) "... at the prompting of her children."

O'Neill has dual citizenship, being a Brazilian and U.S. citizen.

== Activism ==
In 2004, O'Neill wrote and published From Fallen to Forgiven, a book of biographical notes and thoughts about life and existence. O'Neill recounted how she underwent an abortion at age 22 in 1970 while dating a Wall Street socialite after the divorce from her first husband. Her regrets over the experience contributed to her becoming a Pro-Life activist and a born-again Christian in 1986 at age 38. She also began counseling abstinence to teens. Concerning her abortion, she writes:

I was told a lie from the pit of hell: that my baby was just a blob of tissue. The aftermath of abortion can be equally deadly for both mother and unborn child. A woman who has an abortion is sentenced to bear that for the rest of her life.

O'Neill continues to be active as a writer, working on her second autobiography, CoverStory, an inspirational speaker, and fundraiser for the benefit of crisis pregnancy centers across the United States. She has also served as the spokesperson for the Silent No More Awareness Campaign, an organization for people who regret that they or their partners had abortions.

She also founded Hope and Healing at Hillenglade, an equine-assisted therapy foundation in Nashville, Tennessee, that serves war veterans suffering from post-traumatic stress disorder.

== Filmography ==
=== Film ===
| Year | Title | Role | Notes | Ref. |
|---|---|---|---|---|
| 1968 | For Love of Ivy | Sandy | | |
| 1969 | Some Kind of a Nut | The Beauty | Uncredited | |
| 1970 | Rio Lobo | Shasta Delaney | | |
| 1971 | Summer of '42 | Dorothy Walker | | |
| 1971 | Such Good Friends | Miranda | | |
| 1972 | The Carey Treatment | Georgia Hightower | | |
| 1972 | Glass Houses | Jean | | |
| 1973 | Lady Ice | Paula Booth | | |
| 1975 | The Reincarnation of Peter Proud | Ann Curtis | | |
| 1975 | Whiffs | Lt. Scottie Hallam | | |
| 1975 | The Flower in His Mouth | Elena Bardi | Italian: Gente di rispetto | |
| 1976 | The Innocent | Teresa Raffo | Italian: L'innocente | |
| 1977 | The Psychic | Virginia Ducci | Italian: Sette note in nero | |
| 1978 | Caravans | Ellen Jasper | | |
| 1979 | A Force of One | Mandy Rust | | |
| 1979 | Steel | Cass Cassidy | | |
| 1980 | Cloud Dancer | Helen St. Clair | | |
| 1981 | Scanners | Kim Obrist | | |
| 1987 | I Love N.Y. | Irene | | |
| 1991 | Committed | Susan Manning | | |
| 1992 | Invasion of Privacy | Hillary Wayne | Direct-to-video | |
| 1994 | Discretion Assured | Paige | | |
| 1994 | The Visual Bible: Acts | Lydia of Thyatira | Direct-to-video | |
| 1997 | The Corporate Ladder | Irene Grace | | |
| 1997 | The Ride | Ellen Stillwell | | |
| 1999 | The Prince and the Surfer | Queen Albertina | | |
| 2002 | Time Changer | Michelle Bain | | |
| 2012 | Last Ounce of Courage | Dottie Revere | | |
| 2013 | Doonby | Barbara Ann | | |
| 2016 | I'm Not Ashamed | Linda | | |
| 2024 | Reagan | Older Nelle Reagan | | |

=== Television ===
| Year | Title | Role | Notes |
|---|---|---|---|
| 1979 | Love's Savage Fury | Laurel Taggart | TV movie |
| 1981 | The Other Victim | Nancy Langford | TV movie |
| 1983 | Bare Essence | Lady Bobbi Rowan | Main role (11 episodes) |
| 1984-1985 | Cover Up | Danielle Reynolds | Main role (22 episodes) |
| 1985 | A.D. | Messalina | TV miniseries |
| 1985 | Chase | Sandy Albright | TV movie |
| 1986 | Perry Mason: The Case of the Shooting Star | Alison Carr | TV movie |
| 1988 | The Red Spider | Stephanie Hartford | TV movie |
| 1988 | Glory Days | Scotty Moran | TV movie |
| 1989 | Full Exposure: The Sex Tapes Scandal | Debralee Taft | TV movie |
| 1989 | Miss Hollywood Talent Search | TV special | Co-Host |
| 1990 | Personals | Heather Moore | TV movie |
| 1992 | Perfect Family | Maggie | TV movie |
| 1993 | The Cover Girl Murders | Kate | TV movie |
| 1994 | Jonathan Stone: Threat of Innocence | Nan Stone | TV movie |
| 1995 | Silver Strand | Louellen Peterson | TV movie |
| 1996 | Voyeur II | Elizabeth (voice) | Video game |
| 1996 | Poltergeist: The Legacy | Lorraine Compton | Episode: "Revelations" |
| 1997 | Nash Bridges | Jenny | Episode: "Shake, Rattle & Roll" |
| 2000 | On Music Row | Linda Rodgers | TV movie |
| 2000 | Heroes and Sheroes | Self | Reality TV |

== Bibliography ==
- Surviving Myself, New York: William Morrow and Company, 1999.
- From Fallen to Forgiven, Thomas Nelson, 2002.
- You're Not Alone: Healing Through God's Grace After Abortion. Faith Communications, 2005.
- Remarkable Women, Insight Publishing Group, 2005.
- A Fall Together, B&H Publishing Group, 2006.
- A Winter of Wonders, B&H Publishing Group, 2007.
- A Late Spring Frost, B&H Publishing Group, 2007
- Faith Lessons, Insight Publishing Group, 2008.

== Sources ==
- Freeland, Cynthia (2018). The Naked And The Undead: Evil And The Appeal Of Horror. New York City, New York: Routledge. ISBN 978-0-429-96478-7.
- Monaco, James (1981). Who's Who in American Film Now. New York City, New York: New York Zoetrope. ISBN 978-0-918-43227-8.
- O'Neill, Jennifer (1999). Surviving Myself. Sevierville, Tennessee: Insight Publishing. ISBN 978-0-688-15992-4.
- Sweeney, Kevin (1999). James Mason: A Bio-Bibliography. Westport, Connecticut: Greenwood Publishing Group. ISBN 978-0-313-28496-0.
