= Gardens of Lucullus =

Ancient garden in Rome

Coordinates: 41.908°N 12.484°E

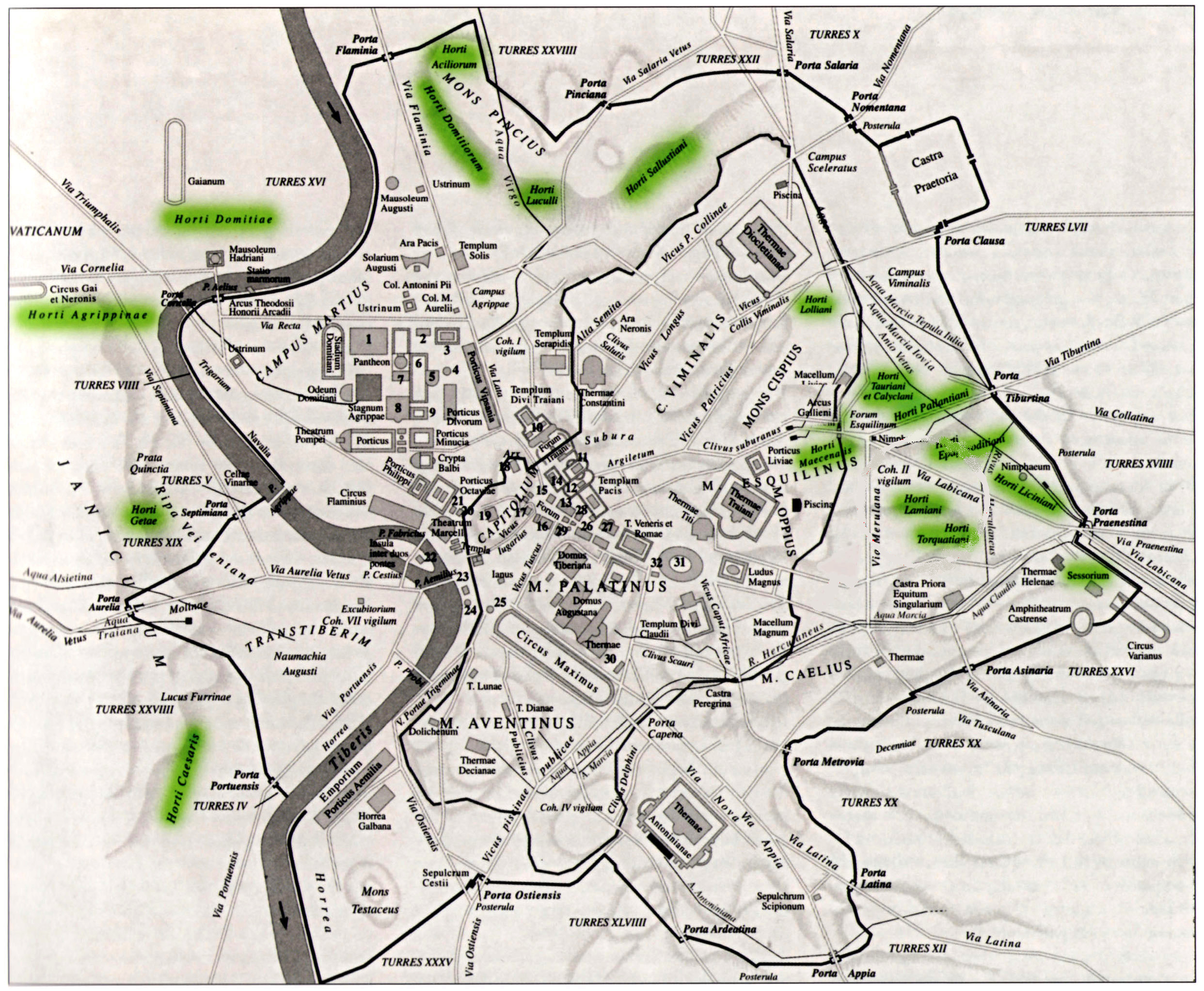
Horti of ancient Rome

The Gardens of Lucullus (Latin: Horti Lucullani) were the setting for an ancient villa on the Pincian Hill on the edge of Rome; they were laid out by Lucius Licinius Lucullus about 60 BC. The Villa Borghese gardens still cover 17 acres (6.9 ha) of green on the site, now in the heart of Rome, above the Spanish Steps.

== Description ==
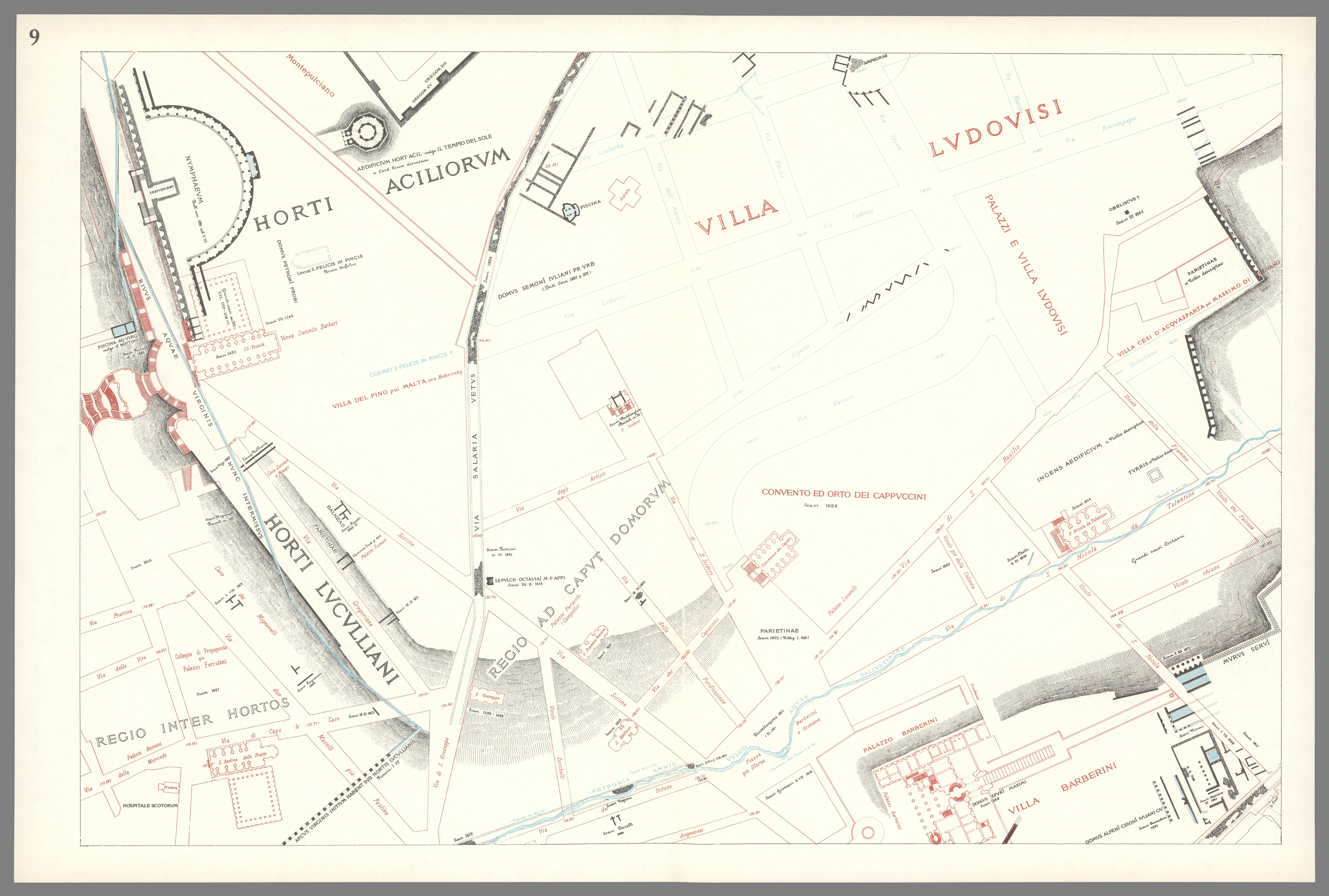
Plan from Forma Urbis Romae (Lanciani)

The fabled gardens of Lucullus were among the most influential in the history of gardening. Lucullus had first-hand experience of the Persian gardening style, in the satraps' gardens of Anatolia ("Asia" to the Romans) and in Mesopotamia and Persia itself. As Plutarch pointed out, "Lucullus [was] the first Roman who carried an army over Taurus, passed the Tigris, took and burnt the royal palaces of Asia in the sight of the kings, Tigranocerta, Cabira, Sinope, and Nisibis, seizing and overwhelming the northern parts as far as the Phasis, the east as far as Media, and making the South and Red Sea his own through the kings of the Arabians." These comments indicate that it was well understood in Rome that this new luxury of gardening originated in Persia.

Lucullus's rural villas in the hills at Tusculum, near modern Frascati, and at Naples were also set in lavish garden settings. Plutarch, in 'Lucullus' ch. 37, mentions "the chambers and galleries, with their sea-views, built at Naples by Lucullus, out of the spoils of the barbarians.", and Pliny writes of Lucullus cutting a channel through a mountain on his Naples estate to allow seawater to circulate in his fishpond, which recalled the channel that had been cut through the isthmus at Mount Athos by the Persian king. Because of the massive piles which he built in the sea at his villa in Naples, Pompey mockingly nicknamed Lucullus "the Roman Xerxes", and Tubero called him "Xerxes in a toga".

Plutarch, like most of Lucullus's Roman contemporaries, thought these occupations of Lucullus's retirement unbecoming to a Roman, and mere play:

For I give no higher name to his sumptuous buildings, porticos and baths, still less to his paintings and sculptures, and all his industry about these curiosities, which he collected with vast expense, lavishly bestowing all the wealth and treasure which he got in the war upon them, insomuch that even now, with all the advance of luxury, the Lucullan gardens are counted the noblest the emperor has. Tubero, the stoic, when he saw his buildings at Naples, where he suspended the hills upon vast tunnels, brought in the sea for moats and fish-ponds round his house, and pleasure-houses in the waters, called him Xerxes in a toga. He had also fine seats in Tusculum, belvederes, and large open balconies for men's apartments, and porticos to walk in, where Pompey coming to see him, blamed him for making a house which would be pleasant in summer, but uninhabitable in winter; whom he answered with a smile, "You think me, then, less provident than cranes and storks, not to change my home with the season."

Though a Lucullan feast has passed into proverb, Lucullus was not a mere conspicuous consumer. He formed a fine library and kept it open to scholars, wrote himself and supported writers. His garden was filled with works of art, particularly Greek sculpture, both originals and copies of “old masters”, and has thus been a rich archaeological source of ancient sculpture: for example, the statue of the Scythian knife sharpener (now thought to depict the executioner getting ready to flay Marsyas) which the Medici removed to Florence was found in this garden.

== Later history ==
The gardens became the favourite playground of Claudius's Empress Messalina (after she forced the then owner, Valerius Asiaticus, to commit suicide – Tac. Annals XI.1), and was the site of her execution in 48 AD on the orders of the Emperor Claudius, her husband. From shortly afterwards, in around 55 AD, mosaics excavated in the gardens have provided the earliest known use of tesserae made with the technique of gold sandwich glass, which was to remain an essential component of Byzantine and Western mosaics. In the 16th century they were owned by Felice della Rovere, daughter of Pope Julius II. The Villa Borghese portion was a vineyard in 160–5, when it was returned to be a grand garden.

== See also ==
- Roman gardens
