= Fernand Lematte =

French painter (1850–1929)

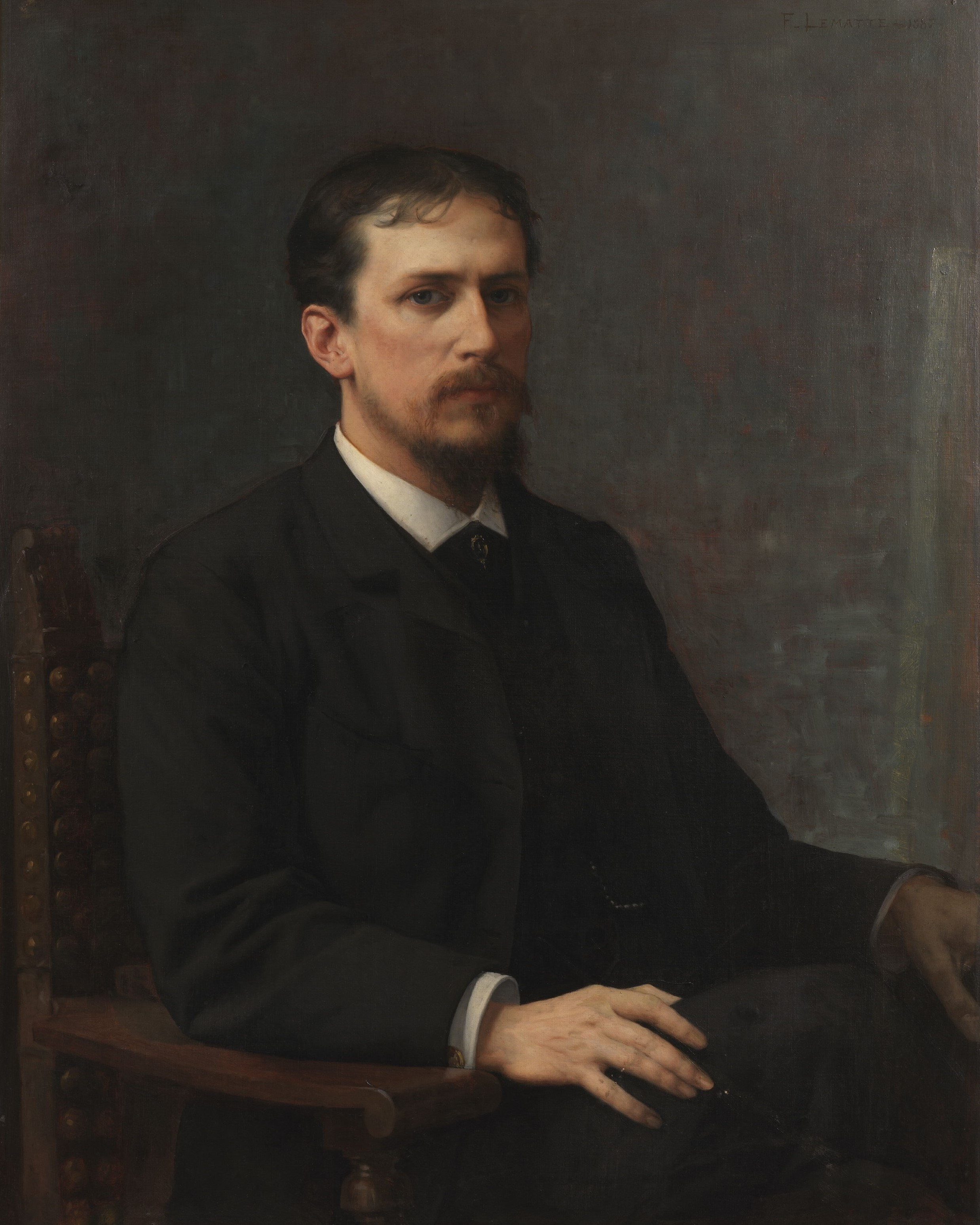
Self-portrait, 1887

Jacques François Fernand Lematte (26 July 1850 – 26 April 1929) was a French painter. He was born at Saint-Quentin, Aisne and studied in Alexandre Cabanel's studio at the École des beaux-arts de Paris, winning the Prix de Rome with The Death of Messalina (1870) and staying at the Villa Medici in Rome from 1871 to 1874.
