= Alfred Junge =

German art director (1886–1964)

- Born: 29 January 1886; Görlitz, Silesia, German Empire (present-day Görlitz, Germany)
- Died: 16 July 1964 (aged 78); Bad Kissingen, West Germany
- Occupation: Art director
- Years active: 1923–1957 (film)

Alfred Junge (29 January 1886, Görlitz, Silesia (now Saxony), Germany – 16 July 1964, Bad Kissingen, West Germany) was a German production designer who spent a large part of his career working in the British film industry.

== Biography ==
Junge had wanted to be an artist from childhood. Dabbling in theatre in his teenage years, he joined the Görlitz Stadttheater at eighteen and was involved in all areas of production. He worked in the theatre for over fifteen years. Junge began his career in film at Berlin's UFA studios, working there as an art director from 1920 until 1928, when he relocated to British International Pictures as part of the production team of director E.A. Dupont. He remained with BIP at Elstree Studios until 1930 when he returned briefly to the continent to work in Germany and then in France with Marcel Pagnol. From 1932 he remained in Britain.

Michael Balcon placed him in charge of the new Gaumont British art department where his organisational skills as well as talent came into their own, running a large staff of art directors and craftsmen who worked on any number of films at one time. After being Gaumont Britain's first real supervising art director, he moved to MGM-British where he continued until the outbreak of the Second World War.

After a brief spell spent interned as an enemy alien on the Isle of Man, Junge returned to film work. In 1939, he had worked with Powell and Pressburger on Contraband, the first of eight pictures he made with the partnership. The last of these was Black Narcissus (1947); his designs for the Himalayas-set film earned Junge the Oscar for Best Art Direction.

From 1947 to 1955, he was in charge of MGM-British's art department, working on transatlantic titles such as Ivanhoe (1952). During this period he received a second nomination for the Arthurian epic Knights of the Round Table (1954).

He was the first film production designer to have one of his pictures hung in the Royal Academy in London, a sketch of The Road to Estaminet du Pont which he created in preparation for his work on The Life and Death of Colonel Blimp (1943).

Michael Powell called him "probably the greatest art director that films have ever known".

== Filmography ==
- The Green Manuela (1923)
- Inge Larsen (1923)
- The Ancient Law (1923)
- Man Against Man (1924)
- The Man at Midnight (1924)
- Waxworks (1924)
- Athletes (1925)
- The Salesgirl from the Fashion Store (1925)
- An Artist of Life (1925)
- Den of Iniquity (1925)
- The Alternative Bride (1925)
- Variety (1925)
- The Battle Against Berlin (1926)
- Lace (1926)
- Aftermath (1927)
- The Tragedy of a Lost Soul (1927)
- Mata Hari (1927)
- Love Affairs (1927)
- Regine (1927)
- Make Up (1927)
- Moulin Rouge (1928)
- Docks of Hamburg (1928)
- The Favourite of Schonbrunn (1929)
- Piccadilly (1929)
- Three Around Edith (1929)
- Triumph of Love (1929)
- Two Worlds (1930, British)
- Menschen im Käfig (1930)
- Two Worlds (1930, German)
- Marius (1931)
- Salto Mortale (1931)
- Nights in Port Said (1932)
- The Magic Top Hat (1932)
- Eight Girls in a Boat (1932)
- The Midshipmaid (1932)
- After the Ball (1932)
- The Good Companions (1933)
- I Was a Spy (1933)
- The Constant Nymph (1933)
- Britannia of Billingsgate (1933)
- Sleeping Car (1933)
- Waltz Time (1933)
- Turkey Time (1933)
- Leave It to Smith (1933)
- Friday the Thirteenth (1933)
- A Cuckoo in the Nest (1933)
- Channel Crossing (1933)
- The Ghoul (1933)
- Orders Is Orders (1933)
- Waltz Time (1933)
- A Cup of Kindness (1934)
- Wild Boy (1934)
- The Iron Duke (1934)
- Evergreen (1934)
- The Fire Raisers (1934)
- Jack Ahoy (1934)
- My Song for You (1934)
- Evensong (1934)
- Jew Süss (1934)
- Lady in Danger (1934)
- Little Friend (1934)
- Red Ensign (1934)
- The Man Who Knew Too Much (1934)
- Dirty Work (1934)
- Road House (1934)
- The Clairvoyant (1935)
- The Night of the Party (1935)
- Me and Marlborough (1935)
- Bulldog Jack (1935)
- The Guv'nor (1935)
- Car of Dreams (1935)
- His Lordship (1936)
- Everything Is Thunder (1936)
- It's Love Again (1936)
- Head over Heels (1937)
- King Solomon's Mines (1937)
- Gangway (1937)
- Young and Innocent (1937)
- Sailing Along (1938)
- The Citadel (1938)
- Climbing High (1938)
- Goodbye, Mr. Chips (1939)
- Busman's Honeymoon (1940)
- Contraband (1940)
- He Found a Star (1941)
- The Life and Death of Colonel Blimp (1943)
- The Silver Fleet (1943)
- A Canterbury Tale (1944)
- The Volunteer (1944, short)
- I Know Where I'm Going! (1945)
- A Matter of Life and Death (1946)
- Black Narcissus (1947)
- Edward, My Son (1949)
- Conspirator (1949)
- The Miniver Story (1950)
- Calling Bulldog Drummond (1951)
- Ivanhoe (1952)
- The Hour of 13 (1952)
- Time Bomb (1953)
- Never Let Me Go (1953)
- Mogambo (1953)
- Knights of the Round Table (1953)
- Flame and the Flesh (1954)
- Seagulls Over Sorrento (1954)
- Betrayed (1954)
- Beau Brummell (1954)
- Bedevilled (1955)
- The Adventures of Quentin Durward (1955)
- That Lady (1955)
- Invitation to the Dance (1956)
- A Farewell to Arms (1957)
- The Barretts of Wimpole Street (1957)

== See also ==
- Art Directors Guild Hall of Fame
- List of German-speaking Academy Award winners and nominees
