= Buddy Bradley (choreographer) =

African-American dancer and choreographer (1905–1972)

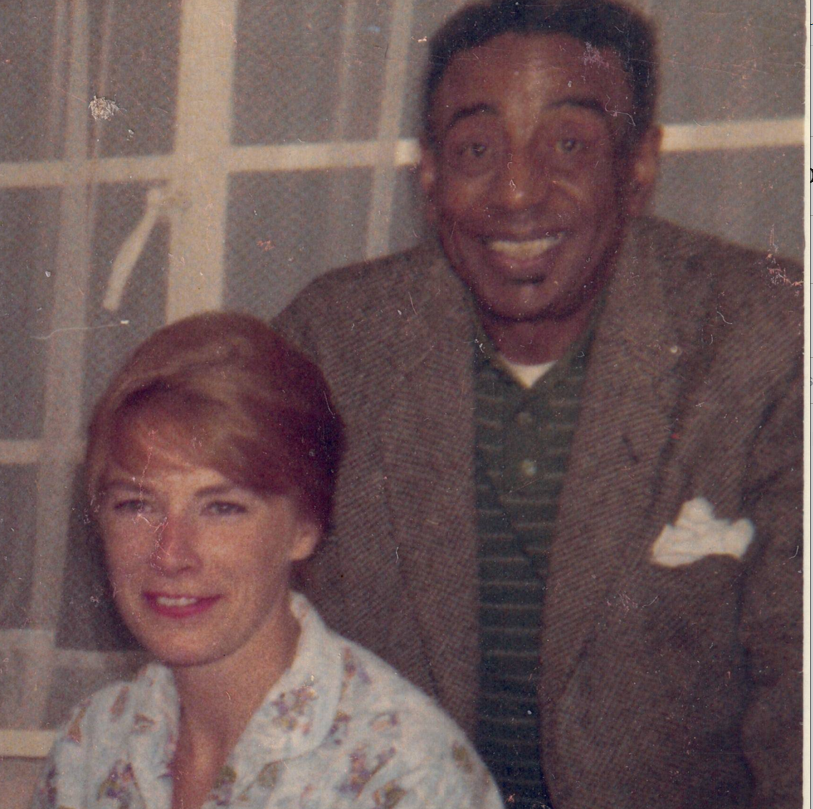
- Bradley and his wife Dorothy in 1963
- Born: Clarence Bradley Epps; July 24, 1905; Clarkesville, Georgia, USA
- Died: July 17, 1972 (aged 66); New York City, US
- Occupations: Dancer and choreographer, dance school owner and teacher
- Spouse: Dorothy Pitchford

Buddy Bradley (July 24, 1905 – July 17, 1972) was a transformative African-American choreographer who brought jazz and tap dance to new stages on both sides of the Atlantic from the Harlem Renaissance onwards, In the 1930s he relocated to London. He worked in the West End for more than 35 years as a choreographer and teacher. In addition to his role as the international disseminator of jazz dance, Bradley advanced the integration of dance into the book musical, was the go-to choreographer for British film in the 1930s, and, through collaborations with ballet choreographers George Balanchine and Frederick Ashton, contributed to the development of neoclassical ballet.

== Biography ==
Born as Clarence Bradley Epps in Clarkesville, Georgia, he began his career in the United States as a dancer in Harlem Renaissance nightclubs. In 1925, he began teaching jazz dance to theatre professionals at the Billy Pierce Studio, the first African American dance institution on Broadway. His successful reworking of The Greenwich Village Follies in 1926 launched his career as a theatre choreographer. Due to prevailing racism, he never received program credit for his work on Broadway.

Bradley first went to England in 1930 to choreograph Rodgers and Hart's Ever Green for producer Charles B. Cochran, starring a young Jessie Matthews. In the course of his career, he worked on nearly 89 Broadway and West End shows, including six which he co-choreographed with Frederick Ashton, and 25 films. He was the first black choreographer of an all-white show in London, He often worked with Andrée Howard, including 1935's Let's Go Gay.

Bradley also ran his own dance school.

He returned to the US in the late 1960s. He died in New York City on July 17, 1972, aged 66.

== Filmography ==
- Evergreen (1934), choreography
- It's Love Again (1936)
- Sailing Along (1938)
- Head over Heels (1937), as choreographer and dancer
- Gangway (1937)
- The Spider (1940)
- Brass Monkey (1948)
