= Brown on Resolution (film) =

1935 British film by Anthony Asquith and Walter Forde

- VHS cover of the re-issue
- Directed by: Walter Forde; Anthony Asquith
- Written by: J. O. C. Orton dialogue Michael Hogan; Gerard Fairlie
- Based on: novel by C. S. Forester
- Produced by: Michael Balcon
- Starring: John Mills; Betty Balfour; Barry MacKay; Jimmy Hanley
- Cinematography: Bernard Knowles
- Edited by: Otto Ludwig
- Music by: Louis Levy
- Distributed by: Gaumont British Picture Corporation
- Release dates: 15 May 1935 (UK); 19 October 1935 (USA)
- Running time: 70 minutes
- Country: United Kingdom
- Language: English

Brown on Resolution (US title: Born for Glory; UK re-issue title: Forever England) is a 1935 film directed by Walter Forde and Anthony Asquith and starring John Mills in his first lead role. It was written by J. O. C. Orton based on the 1929 C. S. Forester novel of the same title. The film is notable for being the first film to use actual Royal Navy ships. The plot is centred on the illegitimate son of a British naval officer helping to bring about the downfall of a German cruiser during World War I.

The novel was also later adapted as Sailor of the King (also titled Single-Handed in the US, and sometimes – though rarely – Brown on Resolution), in 1953. The 1935 version retains the novel's original World War I setting, but in the 1953 remake, the setting is realistically updated to the Second World War, as the Germans resumed commerce raiding with surface warships in 1939.

== Plot ==
In 1893, Betty Brown meets debonair young naval officer Lieutenant Summerville and falls in love with him. They have a brief affair until he has to rejoin his ship but as they part, Betty tells him they should not meet again because they are from different social classes and so a marriage would never succeed; however, he gives her a prized watch which is a family heirloom. Later, Betty discovers she is pregnant, but she conceals the pregnancy from him; she gives birth to a boy, Albert Brown, and raises him alone. He joins the Navy as soon as he is old enough, while Summerville, by then a captain but not recognizing the boy as his son, presents him with a sports cup for boxing on his graduation from a naval school.

Brown's ship, HMS Rutland, is posted to the Pacific, where in port they encounter and socialize with the crew of a German armoured cruiser, the SMS Zeithen. Shortly afterwards, the First World War begins, and at sea Rutland again encounters the much more powerful Zeithen, which it had been shadowing until a British battlecruiser HMS Leopard, can rendezvous with it so they can attack it together. Rutland is sunk, and Brown and a shipmate are rescued and taken prisoner aboard Zeithen. However, Rutland had succeeded in damaging Zeithen, so its captain plans to pull into an isolated anchorage at the remote Galápagos island of Resolution to repair the vessel. There, the resourceful Brown escapes, steals a rifle and a small amount of ammunition, and makes his way ashore. From there, he picks off exposed crewmen trying to repair the punctured hull plates on Zeithen, hoping to delay it until Leopard, which is commanded by Captain Summerville, arrives.

Zeithen's main battery bombards the island but Brown is able to hide in the rocks. A shore party is sent to the island and Brown is eventually hit by a German shot, from which he later dies, never learning that his actions did delay the repairs long enough for Leopard to arrive and destroy Zeithen in an exchange of fire. The German captain is taken prisoner and reveals what delayed him, but also that his son, who was serving with him, did not survive. Brown's body and belongings are recovered and he is buried on the island, where the British erect a cross on the highest point to commemorate him. Aboard Leopard, Captain Summerville looks through Brown's belongings and sees the watch that he had once given to Betty; he realizes that Albert Brown was his son, so both captains lost their sons in the battle.

== Cast ==
- Betty Balfour as Elizabeth Brown
- John Mills as Albert Brown
- Barry MacKay as Lt. Somerville
- Jimmy Hanley as Ginger
- Howard Marion-Crawford as Max
- H. G. Stoker as Captain Holt
- Percy Walsh as Kapitan von Lutz
- George Merritt as William Brown
- Cyril Smith as William Brown, Jr.
- Charles Childerstone (uncredited)

== Production ==
=== Development ===
In July 1933 Gaumont British announced they would make a film of the novel. Production was delayed as the studio negotiated with the Admiralty for co operation. In August 1933 it was announced as part of a two year slate of £1 million from Gaumont British.

In November the studio announced it would make the film as part of their next line up of projects. In January 1934 Walter Forde was announced as director.

By June 1934 the film had still not been made. The Admiralty had given some indication they would co operate, but William Fisher, Commander of the Mediterranean Fleet, was unhappy at the thought of British sailors playing Germans in the film, thinking it would be bad for morale.

In October the Admiralty agreed to cooperate. The "German raider Zeithen" was played by British C-class cruiser HMS Curacoa which sank after a collision with RMS Queen Mary, 2 October 1942; "Second-class cruiser HMS Rutland" was played by destroyer leader HMS Broke which sank after receiving shore battery fire in Algiers, 8 November 1942, and "Armoured Cruiser HMS Leopard" by the new Leander-class cruiser HMS Neptune which was sunk 19 December 1941 by mines off Tripoli. This was the first time that the Royal Navy had co-operated with a film company to this extent (though Sergei Eisenstein had had the use of Soviet Russian naval vessels for his film Battleship Potemkin in 1925).

=== Casting ===
In July Gaumont announced the role of the mother would be played by Betty Balfour, a silent film star who had recently made a comeback in Evergreen. The cast included war hero Henry Hugh Gordon Stoker. He had been in a production of Journey's End with Mills. John Mills recalled O went for the main part, but I was told I didn’t look enough like a sailor. The next day, I borrowed a sailor’s uniform, went back and got the job. This was the film that made me what is called ‘a star’."

=== Shooting ===
The battleship Iron Duke would be filmed at Portsmouth; the Curacoa at Mullion Cove Cornwall; the cruiser Neptune at Invergordon and at sea; Broke and the flotilla would be shot at sea. The Admiralty also allowed filming at the Gunnery School, Whale Island and the Boys Training Establishment at Gosport. Filming began in Portsmouth. John Mills, who had been in Britannia of Billingsgate was cast in the lead. His friend was played by Jimmy Hanley. Studio filming took place at Shepherd's Bush.

== Title ==
At one stage the title of the film was going to be "Forever England" based on a line from the Rupert Brooke poem "The Soldier". It was feared that "Brown on Resolution" might be too confusing. But this was the title eventually used.

However Michael Balcon in his memoirs claims that the film was called Forever England, a title he disliked, adding "the original title seemed a good and proper one. I can only imagine it was changed, after it left my hands, under pressure from cinema owners on the assumption that the title was ‘not box office’."

== Release ==
The film was shown privately to King George V.

== Reception ==
The New York Times called it "good hearty entertainment in the Rover Boy tradition."

Variety wrote Mills "gives a natural and sincere study of the hero and is a distinct find for British studios. Whole atmosphere is a tribute to Engllsh seamen, without any undue showing off. An attractive and interesting feature anywhere."
