= Barry MacKay =

Barry MacKay may refer to:

- Barry MacKay (tennis)
- Barry MacKay (actor)

== See also ==
- Barrie McKay, Scottish footballer
