= Dancing on the Ceiling (1930 song) =

1930 popular song by Rodgers and Hart

Song
- Published: 1930
- Composer: Richard Rodgers
- Lyricist: Lorenz Hart

"Dancing on the Ceiling" is a 1930 popular song composed by Richard Rodgers, with lyrics by Lorenz Hart for the 1930 London musical Ever Green when it was sung by Jessie Matthews. It was originally part of the musical Simple Simon, but it was cut from the production before the premiere. In the film of Evergreen (1934), "Dancing on the Ceiling" was again sung by Jessie Matthews.

An early popular recording in the USA in 1932 was by the British Jack Hylton and His Orchestra (with vocal by Pat O'Malley).

The song was identified correctly for a $100,000 grand prize on the game show Name That Tune in 1977.

== Recordings ==
- Frank Sinatra – In the Wee Small Hours (1955)
- Jo Stafford – A Gal Named Jo Columbia CL 2591 (1955)
- Ella Fitzgerald – Ella Fitzgerald Sings the Rodgers & Hart Songbook (1956)
- George Shearing – Velvet Carpet (1956) (instrumental arrangement by Dennis Farnon)
- Chet Baker – (Chet Baker Sings) It Could Happen to You (1958)
- Barbara Cook – Barbara Cook Sings from the Heart: The Best of Rodgers and Hart (1959)
- Jack Jones – Shall We Dance? (1961)
- Jessie Matthews – a single release in 1934.
- Johnny Mathis – The Rhythms and Ballads of Broadway (1960)
- June Christy – A Friendly Session, Vol. 3 (2000)
- Jeri Southern – You Better Go Now (1956)
- Peggy Lee – Dream Street (1957)
- Royce Campbell – Six by Six: A Jazz Guitar Celebration – with Bucky Pizzarelli (2004)
