= Climbing High =

1938 British film by Carol Reed

- Theatrical release poster
- Directed by: Carol Reed
- Written by: Lesser Samuels
- Based on: an original story by Lesser Samuels; Marion Dix
- Produced by: Michael Balcon
- Starring: Jessie Matthews; Michael Redgrave; Noel Madison; Margaret Vyner; Alastair Sim
- Cinematography: Mutz Greenbaum
- Edited by: Al Barnes; Michael Gordon
- Music by: Louis Levy
- Production company: Gaumont British Picture Corporation
- Distributed by: MGM (UK); Twentieth Century Fox Film Corporation (US)
- Release date: November 1938 (UK)
- Running time: 78 minutes
- Country: United Kingdom
- Language: English
- Budget: £94,018

Climbing High is a 1938 British comedy film directed by Carol Reed and starring Jessie Matthews, Michael Redgrave, Noel Madison, Margaret Vyner and Alistair Sim. It was written by Sonnie Hale, Marion Dix and Lesser Samuels and produced by Michael Balcon.

== Plot ==
Nicky Brooke is a wealthy young man who despite his engagement to the aristocratic (and broke) Lady Constance Westaker falls for hard-up model Diana Castles after nearly running her over with his car. In an effort to distance himself from 'tabloid' created tales of his playboy lifestyle, he changes his name and attempts to woo Diana by pretending to be poor.

== Cast ==
- Jessie Matthews as Diana Castles
- Michael Redgrave as Nicky Brooke
- Noel Madison as Gibson
- Alastair Sim as Max
- Margaret Vyner as Lady Constance Westaker
- Mary Clare as Lady Emily Westaker
- Francis L. Sullivan as madman
- Enid Stamp-Taylor as Winnie
- Torin Thatcher as Jim Castle
- Tucker McGuire as Patsey
- Basil Radford as Reggie Baird
- Athole Stewart as uncle
- Kathleen Byron as model
- Terry-Thomas as voice of cow
- Leslie Phillips as child

== Production ==
Climbing High was filmed at Pinewood Studios, Iver Heath, Buckinghamshire by Gaumont British Picture Corporation.

Indian filmmaker Bibhuti Mitra, then a student of cinematography, served as an assistant to Carol Reed during the film's production.

== Reception ==
The Monthly Film Bulletin wrote: "This conventional story is enlivened by some good slapstick. Otherwise the film is distinguished by laboured innuendos, both in situations and dialogue, and by general lack of taste: madness is treated as a hilarious joke. The stars perform their obvious roles efficiently, and a team of excellent supporting players manage to get down to the level of their parts."

Kine Weekly wrote: "Enthusiastic and resourceful team-work offsets to a considerable extent the obvious, and so do the many exuberant gags, but the film would have been better Jessie Matthews and, at the same time, better entertainment had the star been given an opportunity to sing and dance. Somehow this type of fare needs the encouragement of musical embellishment. Still, in spite of this, it is quite a sound light booking."

Variety wrote: "The most hardboiled picturegoer is bound to find lots in this production to laugh about. ... All nicely acted, staged and produced."
