= Glen MacWilliams =

American cinematographer

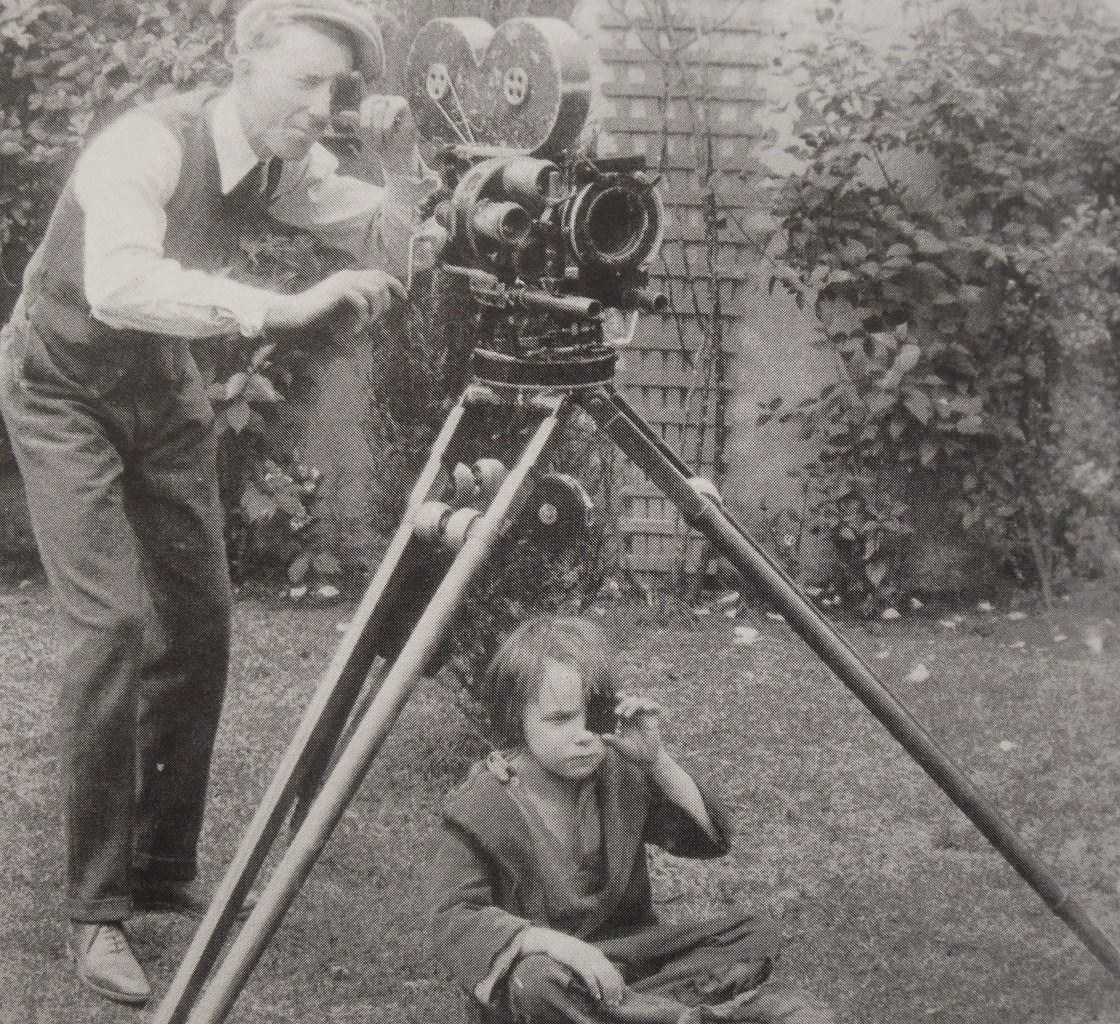
Glen MacWilliams (left) and Jackie Coogan, 1922

Glen MacWilliams (May 21, 1898 – April 15, 1984), was an American cinematographer.

== Biography ==
Born in California, MacWilliams started his career in the silent days. He worked in the United Kingdom for much of the 1930s, working on several musicals with Jessie Matthews. He returned to the US in the 1940s where he worked extensively for 20th Century Fox, filming Laurel and Hardy's first two films for the studio and also worked with Alfred Hitchcock on Lifeboat in 1944. He had previously worked with Hitchcock on one occasion in Britain, on Waltzes from Vienna (1934).

He later worked in television on such shows as Highway Patrol, Wanted: Dead or Alive, The Untouchables and My Living Doll before he retired in the mid-1960s.

== Selected filmography ==
- Headin' South (1918)
- The Poor Simp (1920)
- Wing Toy (1921)
- My Boy (1921)
- The Mother Heart (1921)
- Ever Since Eve (1921)
- The Lamplighter (1921)
- Lovetime (1921)
- Oliver Twist (1922)
- Quicksands (1923)
- The Spider and the Rose (1923)
- Rupert of Hentzau (1923)
- The Wheel (1925)
- Siberia (1926)
- The Return of Peter Grimm (1926)
- Pajamas (1927)
- The Secret Studio (1927)
- Win That Girl (1928)
- The Valiant (1929)
- The Front Page (1931)
- While Paris Sleeps (1932)
- Sleeping Car (1933)
- A Cuckoo in the Nest (1933)
- Waltzes from Vienna (1934)
- Evergreen (1934)
- The Clairvoyant (1935)
- First a Girl (1935)
- My Heart Is Calling (1935)
- Heat Wave (1935)
- The Night of the Party (1935)
- Things Are Looking Up (1935)
- It's Love Again (1936)
- Head Over Heels (1937)
- King Solomon's Mines (1937)
- Gangway (1937)
- The Great Barrier (1937)
- Sailing Along (1938)
- The Proud Valley (1940)
- Dressed to Kill (1941)
- Great Guns (1941)
- A-Haunting We Will Go (1942)
- Lifeboat (1944)
- Wing and a Prayer (1944)
- Winged Victory (1944)
- Shock (1946)
- It Shouldn't Happen to a Dog (1946)
- If I'm Lucky (1946)
- A Lust to Kill (1958)
- The Iron Men (TV Movie) (1966)
