= Catherine, Countess Grixoni =

British fashion model and actress (1935–2024)

Catherine, Countess Grixoni (née Catherine Hale-Monro; 4 January 1935 – 25 January 2024) was a British fashion model and actress. She became a countess through her marriage to the Italian count Donald Grixoni.

== Early life ==
Catherine was the adopted daughter of Jessie Matthews and her second husband Sonnie Hale. Catherine's surname came from her adoptive father, whose real name was John Robert Hale-Monro.

A Portrait of Jessie Matthews was painted in 1937 at the peak of her international screen fame by British artist Thomas Cantrell Dugdale. This artwork was given to Catherine by default. Due to an estranged relationship during the last years of Matthews' life, Catherine was left out of Matthews' 1981 will, which left the portrait to the Tate Gallery, who declined the bequest. Consequently, the portrait went to Catherine as next-of-kin. Catherine put up her mother's portrait at auction with Woolley & Wallis, and it sold in 2010.

== Career ==
Mr. J, a London artistic photographer, and good friend of Catherine's mother, Jessie Matthews, arranged to have Catherine pose as a teenage "flower-girl" in a gardening catalogue commercial. The success of her first work took Catherine to more photo sessions taken by a variety of local photographers in search of fresh and young talent. A few months later, the publication featured an article and images, declaring her the Spring girl. Her greatest influencers were the London fashion designers inviting her to participate in private fashion shows in the Belgravia area. She was eventually hired as a female model for Harrods House of London, and also worked with Italian photographer Enzo Sellerio.

Catherine followed her passion for the performing arts and complimented her modeling work with theatrical classes at various drama studios in London, and classes at Trinity Laban Conservatoire of Music and Dance. Catherine enjoyed a successful career as a model and actress, with a short film and television career. She was always measured under the shadow of her mother's superstar acting career.

== Personal life and death ==
The Italian count Donald Grixoni became interested in Catherine after seeing her modelling works for Harrods. On 15 November 1958, the two married. Although they eventually divorced, she remained known as Catherine, Countess Grixoni. She preserved her husband's alimonies and lived at his family properties in West London. The Grixoni are part of the old Italian nobility of the Savoy-Sardegna Kingdom and related to the House of Candia, of opera superstar count Giovanni Mario de Candia-Grixoni, with homes in Fulham and West Kensington.

Catherine Grixoni died on 25 January 2024, aged 89.
