= Who Killed John Savage? =

1937 film

- Barry MacKay and Kathleen Kelly in the film
- Directed by: Maurice Elvey
- Written by: Basil Dillon
- Based on: Rynox by Philip MacDonald
- Starring: Nicholas Hannen; Barry MacKay; Edward Chapman
- Cinematography: Robert LaPresle
- Edited by: Leslie Norman
- Production company: Warner Brothers-First National Productions
- Distributed by: Warner Brothers (UK)
- Release date: 22 November 1937 (London)
- Running time: 69 minutes
- Country: United Kingdom
- Language: English

Who Killed John Savage? is a lost 1937 British mystery film directed by Maurice Elvey and starring Nicholas Hannen, Barry MacKay, Kathleen Kelly, Henry Oscar and Edward Chapman. It was written by Basil Dillon based on the 1930 novel Rynox by Philip MacDonald. It is a remake of the 1932 Michael Powell-directed film Rynox.

== Preservation status ==
The British Film Institute has classed Who Killed John Savage? as a lost film. Its National Archive holds no ephemera, stills, film or video materials.

== Premise ==
A businessman is found dead, leaving police detectives to work out whether it was suicide or murder.

== Cast ==
- Nicholas Hannen as John Savage
- Barry MacKay as Anthony Benedict
- Edward Chapman as Inspector Chortley
- Kathleen Kelly as Kate Savage
- Henry Oscar as Woolrich
- Ross Landon as Smith
- George Kirby as Prout
- C. Denier Warren as Scruggs

== Critical reception ==
The Monthly Film Bulletin wrote: "Since the characters have no interest in themselves, it is important that the story should have interest. Unfortunately the solving of the mystery is a very dull affair, for only the most simple-minded could miss seeing that Marchetti and Savage were one and the same person. The cast recite their lines competently, and Denier Warren, as the deus ex America, manages to do a little more than that."

Kine Weekly wrote: "Ingnious, cleverly written mystery melodrama, one that can be depended upon fo set the majority guessing. The provocative, exciting plot is backed up by first-rate acting and resourceful direction, and flavoured by appealing romance. Just as the successful thriller of fiction compels the reader to keep his nose glued to every page, so will this, his kinematic counterpart, keep the average patron continually on tenterhooks. ... Nicholas Hannen is arresting in the dual role of Savage and Marchetti; Barry Mackay, Henry Oscar and Ross Landon lead one up the garden successfully as the principal suspects; ...Invention is the keystone of this 'spot the murderer' romantic 'melodrama. Although built on the shifting sands of improbability, it has in it much that is unexpected, cleverly cultivated by the principal players and directors."

The Daily Film Renter wrote: "'Who-done-it?' melodrama with ingenious denouement revealing fact alleged murder victim committed suicide. Plot unfolds in interesting fashion, several innocent characters coming under suspicion. Climax has quota of suspense, plus genuine 'surprise packet,' and romantic issues are duly introduced. Edward Chapman tops cast as scientist-cum-sleuth."

Picturegoer wrote: "Good type of mystery melodrama ... It is ingenious in deduction and generally holds the interest well, in spite of improbabilities. It also leads up to a really exciting climax. A very good performance is given in a dual role by Nicholas Hannen and the principal suspects, Barry Mackay, Henry Oscar and Ross Landon successfully lay red herring trails. Edward Chapman is well in character as the employee."

Picture Show wrote: "This entertaining melodrama may be relied on to keep you guessing. ... It is neatly worked out and well acted."

Variety wrote: "Another 'Who Killed Cock Robin' murder mystery that is properly cinematic and should furnish interesting entertainment. ... Camera work is unpretentious but effective, and there are several mechanically contrived excitements and interesting laboratory scenes full of intimate detail. Nicholas Hannen, one of England's standard actors, is starred in conjunction with Barry Mackay. Hannen acquits himself creditably, as always, and Mackay contributes a nebulous sort of leading role. Edward Chapman gives an effective character interpretation to what would normally be a minor part, and Henry Oscar is sinister throughout. Story good of its kind, but suffers mainly from lack of speed in its unfoldment."

TV Guide gave the film two out of four stars, writing: "though slow to develop, this is an interesting mystery with some nicely detailed moments. Some good thesping by the ensemble overcomes the directorial sluggishness to create an unusual whodunit."
