= Smuggled Cargo =

- Directed by: John H. Auer
- Screenplay by: Earl Felton; Michael Jacoby
- Produced by: John H. Auer
- Starring: Barry MacKay; Rochelle Hudson; George Barbier; Ralph Morgan; Cliff Edwards; John Wray
- Cinematography: Jack A. Marta
- Edited by: Ernest J. Nims
- Music by: Cy Feuer; William Lava; Floyd Morgan
- Production company: Republic Pictures
- Distributed by: Republic Pictures
- Release date: August 21, 1939
- Running time: 62 minutes
- Country: United States
- Language: English

Smuggled Cargo is a 1939 American drama film directed by John H. Auer and written by Earl Felton and Michael Jacoby. The film stars Barry MacKay, Rochelle Hudson, George Barbier, Ralph Morgan, Cliff Edwards and John Wray. The film was released on August 21, 1939, by Republic Pictures.

== Plot ==
A corrupt consortium of fruit growers exploit migrant workers out of their rightful wages, until Gerry Clayton, the son of one of the growers, decides to champion their cause.

== Cast ==
- Barry MacKay as Gerry
- Rochelle Hudson as Marian
- George Barbier as Franklin
- Ralph Morgan as Clayton
- Cliff Edwards as Professor
- John Wray as Chris
- Arthur Loft as Masterson
- Wallis Clark as Dr. Hamilton
- Robert Homans as Kincaid
