= John Jarvis (set decorator) =

- Occupation: Set decorator
- Years active: 1945-1976

John Jarvis was a set decorator. He was nominated for an Academy Award in the category Best Art Direction for the film Knights of the Round Table.

== Selected filmography ==
- Knights of the Round Table (1953)
