= Billy Pierce (choreographer) =

Billy Pierce (14 June 1890 – 11 April 1933) was an African American choreographer, dancer and dance studio owner who has been credited with the invention of the Black Bottom dance that became a national craze in the mid-1920s.

== Biography ==
The son of two freedmen, Dennis and Nellie (née Shorter) Pierce, William Joseph Pierce was born in Purcellville, Virginia. His parents were truck farmers, but Billy, an only child, went to college, matriculating first at Storer College and then attending Howard University.

Pierce started out as a journalist, eventually moving to Chicago to write for the Chicago Defender, the premier African American newspaper of its time. He also worked for two Washington, D.C.–based newspapers, the Dispatcher and the Washington Eagle. During World War I, he served with the 8th Infantry Regiment of the Illinois National Guard, an all-black unit commanded by Lieutenant Colonel Otis B. Duncan, the highest ranking black officer in the United States Army during the War to End All Wars.

As a journalist, Pierce wrote about the arts, but eventually left his typewriter for a life in the theater. Starting in Chicago, he made his bones as a dancer and trombonist in vaudeville and performed as a banjoist in Dr. Diamond Dick's Kickapoo Medicine Show on the Theater Owners Booking Association circuit of black vaudeville theaters, which took him to New York City. In Gotham, he re-entered the newspaper business. It was while soliciting advertising on Broadway, he decided to become a choreographer. He conceived the idea of a dance studio along with Leonard Harper, who soon lost heart. Pierce brought their idea to fruition when he opened a dance studio in one room on the top floor of the Navex building on 46th Street west of Broadway where he doubled as an elevator operator.

The Billy Pierce Dance Studio at 223 West 46th Street in New York flourished and became one of the incubators for the cultural flowering known to posterity as the Harlem Renaissance. By 1929, Pierce's studio—the "largest of its kind" according to the Afro American newspaper—occupied five rooms in the bottom two floors of the building, for which Pierce paid annually $6,000 in rent (equivalent to approximately $109,872 in 2024 dollars).

Pierce ran the studio and coached Broadway stars, but did not serve as an instructor for the 27 classes that were given to students in 1929. The Pierce Dance Studio was the professional home of his fellow African American choreographer Buddy Bradley, who devised dance routines for the eccentric dancer Tom Patricola, a white man. Patricola performed the Black Bottom with the Ann Pennington in the musical-comedy revue George White's Scandals of 1926 on Broadway, whereupon it became popular eventually supplanting Charleston on dance floors across America.

Along with the Black Bottom and the Charleston, among the specialities of the Billy Pierce Dance Studio were the Black Bottom with Taps, the Eccentric Buck and the Syncopated Buck, the Devil Dance, the Dirty Dig, the Flapper Stomp, the Harlem Hips, the Jungle Stomp, the Stair Dance, and the Zulu Stomp.

In the United States, African American choreographers like Pierce and Bradley generally worked uncredited. They also coached and developed routines for white performers, such as Bradley had coached Pericola. Before he became an Oscar-winning character actor, Clifton Webb was a song and dance man on Broadway, appearing in many musicals. He honed his dancing skills at Pierce's studio. Pierce developed the "Moaning Low" dance routine for "Cliff" Webb, as he was then known, and Libby Holman for The Little Show in 1931.

Along with Benny Rubin, Pierce did the choreography for the 1927 musical Half a Widow, one of the few Broadway shows for which he received credit. He also created "The Sugar Foot Strut" dance for the smash hit musical Rio Rita (1927) and developed a show-stopping routine for Norma Terris, who played Magnolia in the original 1927 production of Show Boat and its 1932 revival. He also got credit for choreographing the dances in the 1932 musical revue Walk a Little Faster.

In 1930, he spent eleven months in Europe, working with directors such as Max Rheinhardt.

== Personal life ==
Pierce married Nona Stovall in 1927, and they had two children, Billy Jr. (1928) and Denise (1930). His career was cut short when he died from mastoiditis in 1933 at the age of 42.
