= Gangway (film) =

1937 film

- Contemporary advertisement
- Directed by: Sonnie Hale
- Written by: screenplay: Lesser Samuels scenario: Sonnie Hale
- Story by: Dwight Taylor
- Starring: Jessie Matthews; Barry MacKay; Nat Pendleton
- Cinematography: Glen MacWilliams
- Edited by: Al Barnes
- Music by: music & lyrics: Samuel Lerner; Al Goodhart; Al Hoffman musical director: Louis Levy special orchestration: Bretton Byrd
- Production company: Gaumont British
- Distributed by: Gaumont British Distributors
- Release date: 21 January 1938 (UK)
- Running time: 90 minutes
- Country: United Kingdom
- Language: English

Gangway (Australian title: Sparkles) is a 1937 British musical film directed by Sonnie Hale and starring Jessie Matthews, Barry MacKay, Nat Pendleton and Alastair Sim. It was written by Lesser Samuels and Hale from a story by Dwight Taylor. A young reporter goes undercover to unmask a gang of criminals who are planning a jewel heist.

== Plot ==
Newspaper film critic Pat Wayne boards an ocean liner to New York to interview glamorous movie star Nedda Beaumont. Once aboard, Pat somehow gets mixed up with a gangster, and a Scotland yard inspector, who both mistake her for a female jewel thief called "Sparkle."

== Main cast ==
- Jessie Matthews as Pat Wayne
- Barry MacKay as Bob Deering
- Nat Pendleton as Smiles Hogan
- Alastair Sim as Detective Taggett
- Olive Blakeney as Nedda Beaumont
- Noel Madison as Mike Otterman
- Patrick Ludlow as Carl Freemason
- Liane Ordeyne as Greta Brand
- Graham Moffatt as Joe
- Danny Green as Shorty
- Edmon Ryan as Red Mike
- Lawrence Anderson as Tracy, press agent
- Blake Dorn as Benny the Gent
- Peter Gawthorne as Assistant Commissioner Sir Brian Moore
- Henry Hallett as Smithers, solicitor
- Warren Jenkins as foreign dancer
- Michael Rennie as ship's officer
- Doris Rogers as Mrs. Sherman Van Tuyl

== Critical reception ==
Kine Weekly wrote: "Spectacular musical comedy with a gangster theme, built liberally on box-office lines. There are two distinct locales. English and American, and the latter is possibly the brighter, but so good is the story and team work that the choice is not sufficiently apparent to disturb seriously the entertainment's equilibrium. Jessie Matthews is at her brightest and best in the lead while the supporting cast is cunningly reinforced by the great fooling of Nat Pendleton and Alastair Sim. As for the trimmings, the staging is lavish the songs tuneful and the culminating rough-house burlesque brilliant."

The Daily Film Renter wrote: "This latest Jessie Matthews confection is a light-hearted piece of entertainment, garnished with Lerner-Goodhart-Hoffman tunes that are obviously set to travel the popular rounds."

The Monthly Film Bulletin wrote, "There is less, and less elaborate, singing and dancing than in previous Jessie Matthews' films, but the slight story is amusingly developed, the dialogue is good, Jessie Matthews herself gives a very good light comedy performance and the film as a whole scores on its comedy, and on its burlesque of American gangsters rather than on its music. Nat Pendleton and Noel Maddison are good as the tough gangsters and Alistair Sim as a very secret detective walks away with the picture in the few short scenes in which he appears. Barry Mackay gives a pleasing light performance and keeps the romance in the right key".

Writing for Night and Day in 1937, Graham Greene gave the film a mixed review, complaining of the "pitiably amateurish direct[ion]" and the writing as "hardly distinguished". Greene praised the acting of Sim, but concluded that "the best one can say of Gangway is that it is better than [Hale's] previous picture".

Picturegoer wrote: "Jessie Matthews gives one of her sprightliest performances; she sings and dances quite admirably. The story is a little slow in starting, and it is when the action takes one to America that the real fun gets going, to end in a riotous spectacular climax, complete with gun play. Nat Pendleton is very good as Smiles, a gangster, and Nedda Beaumont is true to type as the temperamental star. Barry Mackay is fair and makes the most of a pleasing personality as the hero, and a very amusing supporting study comes from Alastair Sim."

Picture Show wrote: "Skilful blending of gangster burlesque, song, dance, and romance, this latest Jessie Matthews film will delight all her admirers. She is seen as a newspaper girl who, through a series of misadventures, is mistaken for a notorious jewel thief, and gives a sparkling performance. Barry Mackay is pleasant as her leading man, and excellent comedy work comes from Nat Pendleton, Alastair Sim, and Noel Madison. Delicious entertainment."

Variety wrote: "A disappointment. Gangway is a musical-gangster film. It's the third picture starring Jessie Matthews which Gaumont-British has brought over in a little over a year. Initialer, It's Love Again was by far the best, more recent two proving decided slippers. In this one Miss Matthews is overwhelmed by a badly prepared script and far from adroit direction and production. Sonnie Hale, Miss Matthews' husband and himself a vet London stage comedian, does not seem able to present the star as smartly as she deserves. Perhaps it would be best all around to stop making the Matthews films a family affair."

BFI Screenonline wrote, "it is one of the more enjoyable Matthews vehicles and is fast moving enough to please most audiences."
