= Ever Green =

1930 musical

Advertising flyer for Ever Green, Adelphi Theatre, London, 1930

Ever Green is a musical with music by Richard Rodgers, lyrics by Lorenz Hart and a book by Benn Levy. This was the last of three musicals written by Rodgers and Hart in London.

The musical premiered on 3 December 1930 at the newly renovated Adelphi Theatre, London. It was produced by Charles B. Cochran and directed by Frank Collins with choreography by Buddy Bradley and Billy Pierce. It starred dancer Jessie Matthews (who played both the mother and the daughter) and comedian Sonnie Hale, who married her the following year. It also featured Joyce Barbour, Jean Cadell and Albert Burdon.

The lavish production was noted for the setpiece "Dancing on the Ceiling" that used London's first revolving stage. In this, the two stars danced around a huge chandelier that was standing up from the floor, simulating the ceiling. Matthews subsequently adopted "Dancing on the Ceiling" (also known as "He dances overhead") as her signature tune. The show was Matthews' biggest stage success and led to her renowned film career.

The musical garnered critical and box office success, running for 254 performances. It was later adapted into a successful 1934 film also starring Matthews.

== Synopsis ==
Harriet Green, a music hall star of the Edwardian period, has given birth, out of wedlock, to a daughter. Harriet flees to South Africa to raise her daughter away from the spotlight. The years pass, and now her daughter, Harriet Hawkes, returns to London to try to enter showbusiness. A publicity man, Tommy, sees that young Harriet is a dead ringer for her famous mother and convinces a theatre producer to star her in a new revue as a miraculously youthful Harriet Green. The public believes the ruse, but also believes that Tommy is her son. This leads to complications, because Harriet and Tommy fall in love.

== Musical numbers ==
- "Harlemania"
- "Doing a Little Clog Dance"
- "Dear, Dear"
- "Nobody Looks at the Man"
- "Waiting for the Leaves to Fall"
- "No Place but Home"
- "The Lion King"
- "Quand Notre Vieux Monde Etait Tout Neuf"
- "La Femme a Toujours Vingt Ans!"
- "The Colour of Her Eyes"
- "In the Cool of the Evening"
- "Dancing on the Ceiling"
- "Je M'en Fiche du Sex Appeal!"
- "Hot Blues"
- "If I Give in to You"
