= Sailor of the King =

1953 film directed by Roy Boulting

- US release poster with overseas market name, Sailor of the King.
- Directed by: Roy Boulting
- Screenplay by: Valentine Davies
- Based on: Brown on Resolution by C. S. Forester
- Produced by: Frank McCarthy
- Starring: Jeffrey Hunter; Michael Rennie; Wendy Hiller
- Cinematography: Gilbert Taylor
- Edited by: Alan Osbiston
- Music by: Clifton Parker
- Production company: 20th Century Fox
- Distributed by: 20th Century Fox
- Release date: 11 June 1953
- Running time: 83 minutes
- Country: United Kingdom
- Language: English
- Budget: $1,220,000

Sailor of the King is a 1953 British war film directed by Roy Boulting and starring Jeffrey Hunter, Michael Rennie and Wendy Hiller. It is based on the 1929 novel Brown on Resolution by C. S. Forester. The film is set largely in the Pacific, and Hunter stars as a Canadian sailor serving on a British warship who battles single-handedly to delay a German World War II warship long enough for the Royal Navy to bring it to battle.

The film was released in Britain as Single-Handed.

It was filmed at Shepperton Studios near London and on location in the Mediterranean around Malta. The film's sets were designed by the art director Alex Vetchinsky. An earlier 1935 film Forever England was based on the same novel and starred John Mills under Walter Forde's direction.

== Plot ==
During the First World War, Lieutenant Richard Saville, a young Royal Navy officer on five days' leave, and Miss Lucinda Bentley, a merchant's daughter from Portsmouth, get talking on the train up to London. Halfway through their journey, they miss their rail connection and spend a romantic holiday in the countryside of southern England. When Saville proposes, she accepts, but on the day they are due to go back to Portsmouth, she changes her mind, asking Saville to realise that neither he nor she could bear being parted for the long periods he would be at sea. They part, seemingly forever.

Saville serves out the First World War and the inter-war years and, by the first years of the Second World War, he is in command of a squadron of three cruisers on convoy duty in the Pacific. He receives a message from a British merchantman just before it is sunk by the German raider Essen, but HMS Stratford, the flagship of Saville's squadron is too low on fuel for pursuit and the convoy cannot be left unguarded. Saville decides to remain with the convoy while his other two ships - HMS Amesbury and HMS Cambridge - chase after the raider. Cambridge then has to stop to pick up survivors from the merchantman, leaving the Amesbury on her own. Amesbury finds and attacks the Essen, scoring a major torpedo hit on the Essen’s bow, but is sunk with the loss of all but two hands, Petty Officer Wheatley and Signalman Andrew 'Canada' Brown. Brown is the son of a mother keen on the navy and thus knows more about naval tactics, strategy, and gunnery than most of his rank.

The Essen picks up the two survivors. Meanwhile, news of the Amesbury’s fate reaches Saville in the Stratford. Saville decides to take a risk and go after the Essen with Cambridge. While the Essen is anchored in a rocky lagoon for 36 hours to carry out repairs, Brown manages to escape to the heights around the lagoon with a rifle. Having won marksmanship prizes, he proceeds to pick off sailors working on the repairs, leading the Essen’s captain to use his ship's AA guns and then big guns in a vain attempt to dislodge Brown. Finally, he sends a party of marines to hunt Brown down, but just as they are about to kill him, they are recalled and the Essen departs. Brown collapses, seriously wounded.

As the Essen leaves the lagoon, she is caught and sunk by Saville's force. One of her survivors informs the British of Brown's exploits, which delayed repairs for 18 hours, thus enabling the British to catch up with them. A landing party is sent ashore from Saville's force to find him.

=== Alternative endings ===
The film is unusual for its period in that, for the American version, two different endings were filmed, one in which Brown survives and another in which he is killed. These were both shown in cinemas, and audiences were asked to choose which they preferred.

Both endings are also shown when the film is broadcast on British television (e.g. FilmFour).

==== First ending ====
The landing party searches the island for Brown, as the camera pans to his dead body. The action then cuts to London and an honours investiture, where Saville receives a knighthood for his actions. Brown was found dead by the landing party and was awarded a Victoria Cross posthumously, presented to his mother. She is revealed to be the former Lucinda Bentley, who had moved to Canada after her tryst with Saville. She and Saville meet before she goes to accept her son's medal.

==== Second ending ====
The action cuts straight from the German survivor to an honours investiture in London, where Brown, who has in this version survived to receive his VC, meets Saville. Brown tells Saville that his English mother - to whom he owes his joining the navy - is living in Montreal and unable to make it to the ceremony (though whether or not she is Lucinda is not revealed). Saville informs Brown that he is to be his signaller on their next posting, on the North Atlantic convoy routes. They will both probably get a chance to see his mother in Canada. The pair then stand to attention as the national anthem plays.

== Cast ==
- Jeffrey Hunter as Signalman Andrew 'Canada' Brown
- Michael Rennie as Lieutenant / Captain Richard Saville
- Peter van Eyck as Kapitän Ludwig von Falk
- Wendy Hiller as Lucinda Bentley
- Bernard Lee as Petty Officer Wheatley
- Victor Maddern as Signalman Willy Earnshaw
- John Horsley as Commander John Willis
- Patrick Barr as Captain Tom Ashley, HMS Amesbury
- Robin Bailey as Lieutenant John Stafford, HMS Stratford
- Joan Hickson as Hotel Manager
- Lockwood West as Lieutenant Marsh
- Guido Lorraine as German Officer
- James Copeland as Chief Engineer
- Sam Kydd as Second signalman
- Victor Hagan as Station Master
- Nicholas Bruce as Hesse
- Lowell Gilmore as Emissary of the King (American version)
- The officers and men of HMS Manxman, HMS Cleopatra, and HMS Glasgow.

=== Ships used ===
The Dido-class cruiser HMS Cleopatra plays both the fictional Royal Navy ships HMS Amesbury and HMS Stratford. As Amesbury she is sunk by the more powerful German raider Essen, and as Stratford she triumphs at the end of the story. HMS Cleopatra herself had a distinguished war record, as she was Admiral Vian's flagship at the Second Battle of Sirte, when she was one of four light cruisers which drove off the Italian battleship Littorio and two heavy cruisers in one of the major cruiser actions of the war. The film's battle sequences depict this light cruiser firing her guns and torpedoes in some detail.

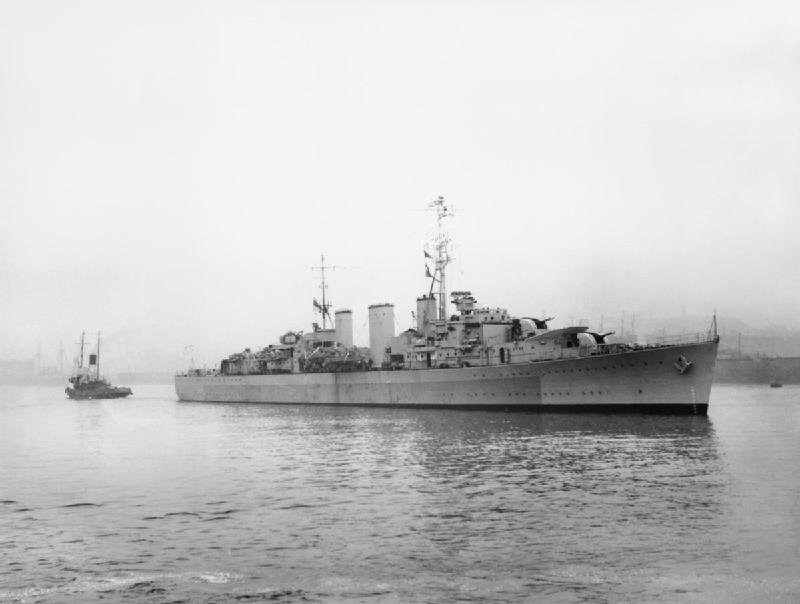
The German raider Essen was portrayed by the minelayer HMS Manxman

The raider Essen is portrayed by HMS Manxman, a fast minelaying cruiser, fitted for the film with large mock-up gun turrets over her 4" guns. The torpedo damage that forces her delay at Resolution Island is simply painted on the side of her port bow. With three enlarged raked funnels, she looks more like a First World War vessel than any of the German Second World War surface raiders, but she is sufficiently different in appearance not to be mistaken for the British ships. The scenes when she is holed up for repairs were filmed in the semi-circular Dwejra bay, guarded by Fungus Rock on the west coast of Gozo Island in Malta. The ship's captain, John Trevor Lean D.S.O., played the part of the navigator in the film as he had to be on the bridge at all times. Several of the ship's company also took part as extras, dressed in German uniforms.

The crew of HMS Glasgow is credited in the opening titles; she is seen in a few distant shots in company with two Dido-class cruisers, and her triple 6" guns are depicted when Essen fires her main armament at the island in an attempt to dislodge Brown.

== Production ==
In January 1952 it was announced Fox had brought the screenrights to Brown on Resolution from C.S. Forester.

The film was originally known as Able Seaman Brown. It was an early star role for Jeffrey Hunter, who was the only American in the cast. The lead character was changed to Canadian to accommodate his accent. British actors' union Equity opposed the casting of an American in a British film, raising a similar complaint for Rock Hudson in The Sea Devils.

The role of Hunter's mother was originally to have been played by Celia Johnson. She was replaced by Wendy Hiller.

Filming began in London on 22 September 1952 with location filming on Malta.

Producer Frank McCarthy knew Lord Mountbatten, which enabled him to secure the cooperation of the British admiralty, especially as Mountbatten admired the novel. It was the first American film shot on real British naval ships. They used the ships HMS Glasgow (C21), HMS Cleopatra (33) and HMS Manxman (M70) - the latter was disguised as the German raider. The studio had to cover the cost of fuel.

== Release ==
Single-Handed had its Royal World Premiere on June 11, 1953, at the Odeon Marble Arch attended by HRH Princess Margaret and Lord Mountbatten. On July 27 it went on general release on the Gaumont circuit paired with a revival of the 1950 film Your Witness.

== Reception ==
Variety called it a "reliable action drama which is tuned up for steady grosses" although it felt Hunter "plays his part in a single key."

FilmInk argued part of the reason the film was not that successful commercially might have been Hunter.

Bosley Crowther of The New York Times wrote: "This episode is the engagement of a German man-of-war by British cruisers in the Pacific early in World War II. This part of the picture is exciting as it is vividly and racily unreeled with almost documentary comprehension under Director Roy Boulting's practiced hand."
