= Noel Madison =

American actor (1897–1975)

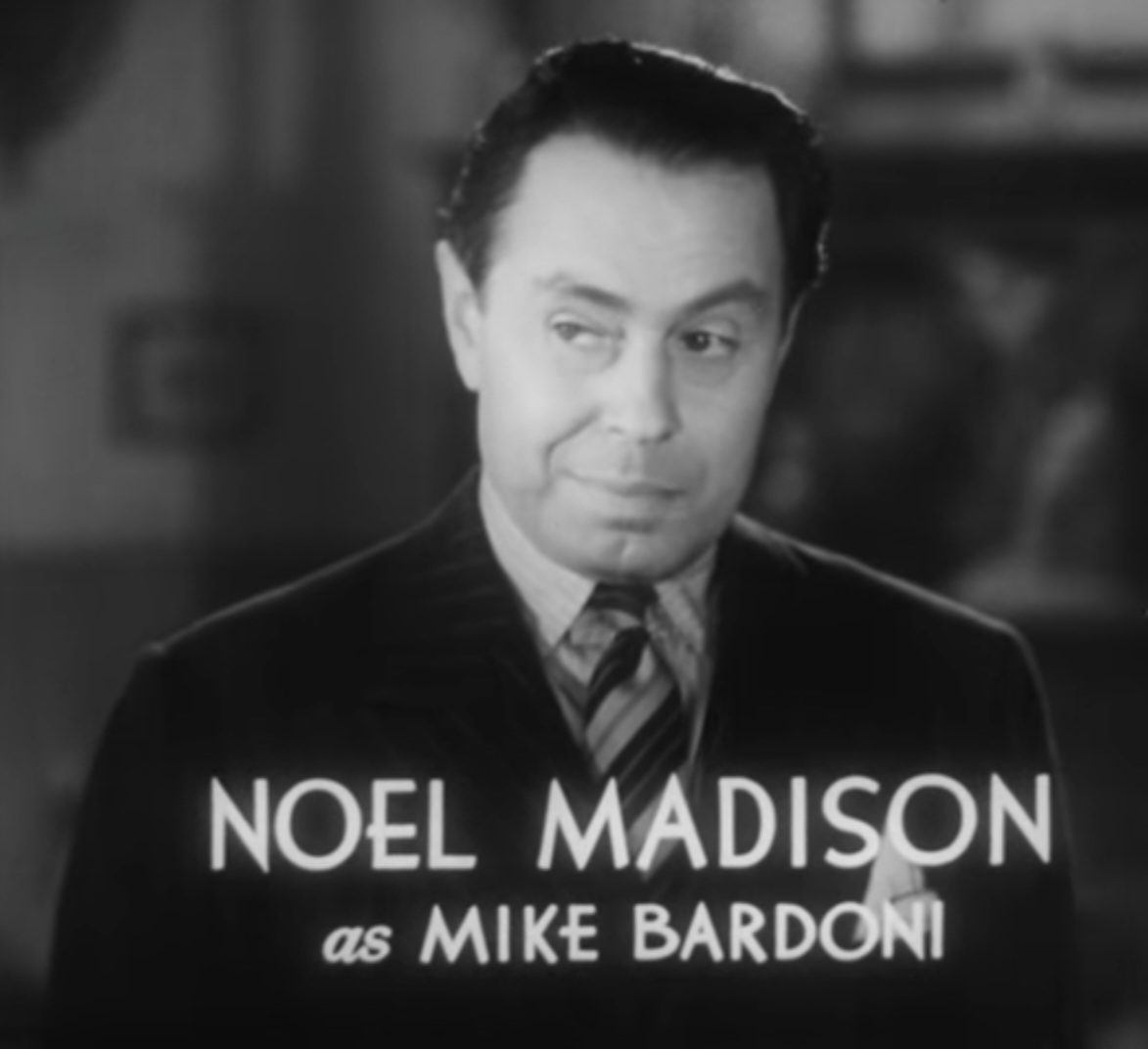
- Madison in The Black Raven (1943)
- Born: Noel Nathaniel Moscovitch; April 30, 1897; New York City, U.S.
- Died: January 6, 1975 (aged 77); Fort Lauderdale, Florida, U.S.
- Occupation: Actor
- Years active: 1930–1948
- Spouse: Marjorie Joyce Nathan (m. 1926)
- Children: 1
- Father: Maurice Moscovitch

Noel Madison (born Noel Nathaniel Moscovitch; April 30, 1897 – January 6, 1975) was an American character actor in the 1930s and 1940s and appeared in 75 films, often as a gangster.

Born in New York City, Madison was the son of actor Maurice Moscovitch and his wife Rose.

Besides his theatrical work in the United States, he acted on stage in England and Australia.

== Partial filmography ==
- Sinners' Holiday (1930) - Buck
- The Doorway to Hell (1930) - Rocco
- Little Caesar (1931) - Killer Peppi (uncredited)
- The Finger Points (1931) - Larry Hayes (scenes deleted)
- The Star Witness (1931) - Horan - Henchman (uncredited)
- The Hatchet Man (1932) - Charley Kee (uncredited)
- Play Girl (1932) - Martie Happ
- The Heart of New York (1932) - Mr. Farola - an Architect (uncredited)
- Symphony of Six Million (1932) - Magnus Klauber
- The Trial of Vivienne Ware (1932) - Angelo Paroni
- Man About Town (1932) - Tony (uncredited)
- Radio Patrol (1932) - Tony
- The Last Mile (1932) - D'Amoro - Cell 6
- Hat Check Girl (1932) - Dan McCoy (uncredited)
- Me and My Gal (1932) - Baby Face Castenega
- Laughter in Hell (1933) - Brownfield
- West of Singapore (1933) - Degama
- Humanity (1933) - Sam Bernstein
- Destination Unknown (1933) - Maxie
- The Important Witness (1933) - Gus Miranda
- Journal of a Crime (1934) - Costelli
- The House of Rothschild (1934) - Carl Rothschild
- I Like It That Way (1934) - Jimmy Stuart
- Manhattan Melodrama (1934) - Manny Arnold
- The Cat's-Paw (1934) - Gangster (uncredited)
- The Girl from Missouri (1934) - Mr. Miller (uncredited)
- Times Square Lady (1935) - (scenes deleted)
- Four Hours to Kill! (1935) - Anderson
- G Men (1935) - Durfee
- What Price Crime (1935) - Douglas Worthington
- The Girl Who Came Back (1935) - Brewster
- Woman Wanted (1935) - Joe Metz
- Three Kids and a Queen (1935) - Stanley
- The Pace That Kills (1935) - Nick - The Pusher
- The Morals of Marcus (1935) - Tony Pasquale
- My Marriage (1936) - Marty Harris
- Muss 'em Up (1936) - Tony Spivali - Gambler
- Murder at Glen Athol (1936) - Gus Colleti
- Champagne Charlie (1936) - Pedro Gorini
- Easy Money (1936) - 'Duke' Trotti
- Straight from the Shoulder (1936) - Trim
- Missing Girls (1936) - Ben Davis
- Our Relations (1936) - Second Gangster at Pirate's Club
- House of Secrets (1936) - Dan Wharton
- Man of the People (1937) - 'Dopey' Benny
- Her Husband Lies (1937) - Jackie Taylor (uncredited)
- The Man Who Made Diamonds (1937) - Joseph
- Gangway (1937) - Mike Otterman
- Nation Aflame (1937) - Frank Sandino
- Sailing Along (1938) - Windy
- Kate Plus Ten (1938, a.k.a. Queen of Crime) - Gregori
- Crackerjack (1938) - Sculpie
- Climbing High (1938) - Gibson
- Anything to Declare? (1938) - Dr. Klee
- Missing Evidence (1939) - Paul Duncan
- Charlie Chan in City in Darkness (1939) - Belescu
- The Great Plane Robbery (1940) - Joe Colson
- Footsteps in the Dark (1941) - Fissue
- Ellery Queen's Penthouse Mystery (1941) - Gordon Cobb
- A Shot in the Dark (1941) - Al Martin
- Highway West (1941) - Salvo - Henchman
- A Tragedy at Midnight (1942) - Ricci (uncredited)
- Joe Smith, American (1942) - Schricker
- Secret Agent of Japan (1942) - Saito
- A Desperate Chance for Ellery Queen (1942) - George Belden
- Bombs over Burma (1942) - Me-Hoi
- Miss V from Moscow (1942) - Police Chief Fritz Kleiss
- Forever and a Day (1943) - Mr. Dunkinfield (uncredited)
- Shantytown (1943) - 'Ace' Lambert
- The Black Raven (1943) - Mike Bardoni
- Jitterbugs (1943) - Tony Queen
- The Gentleman from Nowhere (1948) - Vincent Sawyer (final film role)
