= Henry Oscar =

English actor (1891–1969)

- Henry Oscar c. 1954
- Born: Henry Wale; 14 July 1891; Hornsey, London, England
- Died: 28 December 1969 (aged 78); London, England
- Occupation: Actor
- Years active: 1911–1965

Henry Wale (14 July 1891 – 28 December 1969), known professionally as Henry Oscar, was an English stage and film actor. He changed his name and began acting in 1911, having studied under Elsie Fogerty at the Central School of Speech and Drama, then based in the Royal Albert Hall, London. He appeared in a wide range of films, including The Man Who Knew Too Much (1934), Fire Over England (1937), The Four Feathers (1939), Hatter's Castle (1942), Bonnie Prince Charlie (1948), Beau Brummell (1954), The Little Hut (1957), Beyond This Place (1959), Oscar Wilde (1960), Lawrence of Arabia (1962), The Long Ships (1963) and Murder Ahoy! (1964).

== Selected filmography ==
- After Dark (1932) as Higgins
- Love, Life and Laughter (1934) (uncredited)
- Brides to Be (1934) as Laurie Randall
- Red Ensign (1934) as Raglan
- The Man Who Knew Too Much (1934) as George Barbor, Dentist (uncredited)
- The Case of Gabriel Perry (1935) as Gabriel Perry
- Night Mail (1935) as Mancini
- Me and Marlborough (1935) as Goultier
- The Tunnel (1935) as Grellier
- Father O'Flynn (1935) as Westmacott
- Sexton Blake and the Bearded Doctor (1935) as Dr. Gibbs
- Love in Exile (1936) as Dictator
- Seven Sinners (1936) as Axel Hoyt
- The Man Behind the Mask (1936) as Interpol Detective ("Voltaire")
- Spy of Napoleon (1936) as Hugo Blot
- Dishonour Bright (1936) as Blenkinsop
- No Escape (1936) as Cyril Anstey
- Sensation (1936) as Superintendent Stainer
- Fire Over England (1937) as Spanish Ambassador
- Dark Journey (1937) as Swedish Magistrate
- The Return of the Scarlet Pimpernel (1937) as Robespierre
- Who Killed John Savage? (1937) as Woolrich
- The Academy Decides (1937) as Kyle
- The Terror (1938) as Joe Connor
- Luck of the Navy (1938) as Commdr. Perrin
- Black Limelight (1939) as Inspector Tanner
- The Four Feathers (1939) as Dr. Harraz
- The Saint in London (1939) as Bruno Lang
- On the Night of the Fire (1939) as Pilleger
- Hell's Cargo (1939) as Liner captain
- Dead Man's Shoes (1940) as President of the Court
- Spies of the Air (1940) as Porter
- Tilly of Bloomsbury (1940) as Lucius Welwyn
- The Flying Squad (1940) as Sir Edward, Police Commissioner
- Two for Danger (1940) as Claude Frencham
- Atlantic Ferry (1941) as Josiah Eagles
- The Seventh Survivor (1942) as Goodenough
- Penn of Pennsylvania (1942) as Samuel Pepys
- Hatter's Castle (1942) as Grierson
- The Day Will Dawn (1942) as Newspaper Editor
- Squadron Leader X (1943) as Dr. Schultz
- The Upturned Glass (1947) as Coroner
- Mrs. Fitzherbert (1947) as William Pitt
- The Greed of William Hart (1948) as Moore
- It Happened in Soho as Inspector Carp
- The Idol of Paris (1948) as Lachman
- Bonnie Prince Charlie (1948) as King James II
- The Bad Lord Byron (1949) as Count Gamba
- The Man from Yesterday (1949) as Julius Rickman
- Prelude to Fame (1950) as Signor Mario Bondini
- The Black Rose (1950) as Friar Roger Bacon
- Martin Luther (1953)
- Knights of the Round Table (1953) as King Mark of Cornwall (uncredited)
- Diplomatic Passport (1954) as The Chief
- Beau Brummell (1954) as Dr. Willis
- It's a Great Day (1955) as Borough Surveyor
- Portrait of Alison (1955) as John Smith
- Private's Progress (1956) as Art Expert
- The Little Hut (1957) as Mr. Trollope
- The Spaniard's Curse (1958) as Fredericks
- The Secret Man (1959)
- The Adventures of William Tell as Dr Kein, "The Magic Powder" episode
- Beyond This Place : (Web of Evidence), US (1959) as Alderman Sharpe
- Oscar Wilde (1960) as Justice Wills
- The Brides of Dracula (1960) as Herr Lang
- Foxhole in Cairo (1960) as Col. Zeltinger
- Lawrence of Arabia (1962) as Silliam, Faisal's servant/Reciter (uncredited)
- The Long Ships (1964) as Auctioneer
- Murder Ahoy! (1964) as Lord Rudkin
- The City Under the Sea (1965) as Mumford

== Selected stage credits ==
- Flowers of the Forest (1934) by John Van Druten
- Thank You, Mr. Pepys! (1937) by W.P. Lipscomb
- The Assassin (1948) by Irwin Shaw
- The Shop at Sly Corner (1945) by Edward Percy
- The Moonraker (1952) by Arthur Watkyn
