= Brown on Resolution =

1929 nautical novel written by C. S. Forester

- Title page for Brown on Resolution (1946)
- Author: C. S. Forester
- Genre: Nautical fiction
- Publication date: 1929

Brown on Resolution is a 1929 nautical novel written by C. S. Forester, set during World War I. The hero of the novel, Leading Seaman Albert Brown, is the sole able-bodied survivor of a sunken Royal Navy warship, who single-handedly delays its attacker, a German cruiser, long enough to ensure its destruction by its pursuers.

== Plot ==
The novel opens with Brown, wounded and dying, on fictional Resolution Island in the Galápagos Islands. The story is then told in flashback.

The first part of the story tells of Brown's birth, as a result of a liaison between his mother, Agatha Brown, and a Royal Navy officer, Lieutenant Commander Richard Saville-Samarez. It describes his upbringing in late Victorian and Edwardian England, with Agatha as an unmarried mother pretending to be a widow, and her instilling into him a sense of duty to the Navy and to his country. As soon as he is old enough (fifteen years of age), Brown joins the Navy, and at the start of World War I is serving on the cruiser HMS Charybdis at Singapore.

In the second half of the story Charybdis is sunk by the fictional German armored cruiser SMS Ziethen in the eastern Pacific, and Brown, along with two severely-wounded men, is picked up as POWs by the German ship. As the Ziethen was damaged in the exchange, her captain postpones his commerce raiding mission to Australasian waters, and has to find a deserted anchorage to repair his ship. In the novel, he chooses the fictional Resolution Island in the Galápagos Islands. The resourceful Brown steals a rifle and a small amount of ammunition, water and food, escapes, and makes his way ashore, where he is able to pick off exposed crew members who are trying to repair the ship's damaged hull. As her captain has already careened his vessel, the Ziethen's guns cannot be brought to bear on Brown, and German landing parties are sent ashore to hunt him down. In Forester's description, Resolution Island is an almost-impenetrable tangle of sun-blasted sharp-edged lava blocks covered with cacti, making it extremely difficult for the Germans to locate Brown.

Brown is able to delay the repairs for two days, but is eventually mortally wounded by a lucky rifle shot from a German sailor as the crew is being recalled to the ship. He never learns that his actions delayed the Ziethen long enough to ensure that she is intercepted and destroyed by a pursuing Royal Navy force. Coincidentally, the senior officer of the British force is the now Captain Saville-Samarez, Brown's father, although they never know of each other's existence.

== Historical background ==
As so often with Forester's novels, the action takes place against a background of carefully researched historical fact. During the early part of World War I, Germany had a small squadron of modern vessels in the Far East. When war was declared, the larger vessels of the squadron set out to return to Europe. The light cruisers Nürnberg, Leipzig and Dresden, on detached duty, rejoined after brief periods of raiding, while SMS Emden was detached to serve as a commerce raider. The fictional Ziethen is supposed to be on a similar mission.

Most of the German squadron was eventually destroyed at the Battle of the Falkland Islands, but the British eventually found Dresden anchored and essentially non-operational at an isolated Pacific island. The British then fired on the anchored ship, and unable to effectively fight back, her crew scuttled her.

The German cruiser Ziethen described in the novel does not match any real German warship. She seems to more resemble the Austrian cruiser Kaiserin Elizabeth, which was deployed extensively in the Pacific in the years leading up to WWI. She is a quite good match for the German cruiser "Kaiserin Augusta" which had extensive service in the far east and pacific stations.

== Parallels in Forester's work ==
This novel has some parallels to Forester's Death to the French. In both novels the hero is an enlisted man, cut off from friendly forces and acting alone. In both, the protagonist's dogged and surprisingly effective actions stem from instinctive shrewdness rather than conscious planning.

== Film versions ==
The novel has been filmed twice. John Mills played the title role in the 1935 version, called Brown on Resolution. The 1953 version which starred Jeffrey Hunter as Brown, was called Single-Handed in the UK and Sailor of the King in the US, and was set during World War II.
