= It's Love Again =

1936 film

- Film poster
- Directed by: Victor Saville
- Written by: original screenplay: Marion Dix; Lesser Samuels scenario: Marion Dix additional dialogue: Austin Melford
- Produced by: John Findlay
- Starring: Jessie Matthews; Robert Young
- Cinematography: Glen MacWilliams
- Edited by: Al Barnes
- Music by: musical score: Louis Levy; Bretton Byrd music & lyrics: Sam Coslow; Harry Woods
- Production company: Gaumont British
- Distributed by: Gaumont British Distributors
- Release dates: 6 May 1936 (London, UK); 30 May 1936 (U.S.)
- Running time: 83 minutes
- Countries: United Kingdom; United States
- Language: English

It's Love Again is a 1936 British musical film directed by Victor Saville and starring Jessie Matthews, Robert Young and Sonnie Hale. In the film, a chorus girl masquerades as a big game hunter to try to boost her showbiz career.

The film was made at the Lime Grove Studios, with art direction by Alfred Junge.

== Plot ==
Under pressure to come up with a story, gossip columnist Peter Carlton (Robert Young) invents the imaginary socialite and big game hunter "Mrs. Smythe-Smythe"."" This glamorous lady spends her time hunting tigers, jumping out of airplanes and driving men wild with her beauty. Carlton is somewhat taken aback when the real lady turns up in person, impersonated by aspiring actress Elaine Bradford (Jessie Matthews), in search of her big break.

== Cast ==
- Jessie Matthews as Elaine Bradford/Mrs. Smythe-Smythe
- Robert Young as Peter Carlton
- Sonnie Hale as Freddie Rathbone
- Ernest Milton as Raymond
- Robb Wilton as Boys - Butler
- Sara Allgood as Mrs. Hopkins
- Anthony Holles as Headwaiter
- Cyril Wells as Gigolo
- Warren Jenkins as Woolf
- David Horne as Durland
- Athene Seyler as Mrs. Durland
- Glennis Lorimer as Montague's typist
- Robert Hale as Colonel Edgerton
- Cyril Raymond as Montague
- Graham Moffatt as Callboy
- Olive Sloane as Francine Grenoble (uncredited)

== Critical reception ==
In The New York Times, Frank Nugent wrote, "Gaumont-British has yet to do full justice to Miss Jessie Matthews, first lady of England's musical comedy screen. Her latest picture, "It's Love Again," which opened yesterday at the Roxy, imposes the entire burden of a cumbersome and unevenly paced comedy upon her shoulders and, although she rises to the task with her accustomed loveliness, gayety and talent, she is unable to convert the picture into anything more than what the gentlemen of the drama department would call 'a personal triumph'"; whereas Leonard Maltin noted a "Lighter-than-air musical-comedy vehicle for Matthews following her success with Saville on Evergreen," and found the film, "Funny, charming and imaginatively done, with several pleasant songs."

Writing for The Spectator in 1936, Graham Greene gave the film a good review, describing the direction as "with speed, efficiency, and a real sense of the absurd". Greene praised the acting of Matthews and described the double-entendre-filled scene of the "Oriental party" with the colonel and gossip-writer to be "memorable indeed".

== Bibliography ==
- Low, Rachael. Filmmaking in 1930s Britain. George Allen & Unwin, 1985.
- MacNab, Geoffrey. Searching for stars: stardom and screen acting in British cinema. Casell, 2000.
- Wood, Linda. British Films, 1927-1939. British Film Institute, 1986.
