= Victory Wedding =

1944 British film by Jessie Matthews

- Directed by: Jessie Matthews
- Screenplay by: Doreen Montgomery
- Produced by: Maurice Ostrer
- Starring: Jessie Matthews; John Mills; Dulcie Gray
- Production company: Gainsborough Pictures
- Release date: 1944
- Running time: 18 minutes
- Country: United Kingdom
- Language: English

Victory Wedding is a 1944 British short dramatic public information film directed by Jessie Matthews and starring Matthews, John Mills and Dulcie Gray. It was written by Doreen Montgomery. The film was produced by Gainsborough Pictures for the National Savings Committee "Salute the Soldier" campaign.

== Plot ==
Soldier Bill Clark arrives home on leave, and his mother suggests that he meets up with his onetime girlfriend Mary, with whom he has lost contact. They re-start their relationship and Bill proposes to her. Soon after they marry, Bill returns to his overseas posting. The film's commentary encourages women to save money to "help your man to win that better way of life we are all fighting for".

== Cast ==
- Jessie Matthews as narrator
- John Mills as Bill Clark
- Dulcie Gray as Mary
- Beatrice Varley as Mrs Clark
- Vincent Holman as Mr Clark

== Reception ==
In Blackout: Reinventing Women for Wartime British Cinema, Antonia Lant wrote: "As the film opens, the male narrator, in voice-over, calls up both men and women, alternately and together, as different pronouns are heard on the sound track. At first the voice describes the feelings of a man, Bill (Mills), who realizes that Mary (Gray) still loves him: Bill loves the simple things that 'millions of us like him' also love, says the voice. Here the term 'us' refers most unambiguously to men who love women, although the female audience is also being addressed here through the male form. As the film draws to a close, however, the voice-over gradually comes to speak directly to women".
