= Knights of the Round Table (film) =

1953 film by Richard Thorpe

- Theatrical release poster
- Directed by: Richard Thorpe
- Screenplay by: Talbot Jennings; Jan Lustig; Noel Langley
- Based on: Le Morte d'Arthur; 1485 book by Sir Thomas Malory
- Produced by: Pandro S. Berman
- Starring: Robert Taylor; Ava Gardner; Mel Ferrer
- Narrated by: Valentine Dyall
- Cinematography: F. A. Young, F.R.P.S.; Stephen Dade
- Edited by: Frank Clarke
- Music by: Miklós Rózsa
- Color process: Technicolor
- Production company: Metro Goldwyn-Mayer British Studios
- Distributed by: Metro-Goldwyn-Mayer
- Release dates: 22 December 1953 (Hollywood); 15 January 1954 (USA); 12 May 1954 (London)
- Running time: 115 minutes
- Country: United Kingdom
- Language: English
- Budget: $2.6 million
- Box office: $8.1 million

Knights of the Round Table is a 1953 British adventure historical film made by Metro-Goldwyn-Mayer in England and Ireland. Directed by Richard Thorpe and produced by Pandro S. Berman, it was the first film in CinemaScope made by the studio. The screenplay was by Talbot Jennings, Jan Lustig and Noel Langley from Sir Thomas Malory's Le Morte d'Arthur, first published in 1485 by William Caxton.

The film was the second in an unofficial trilogy made by the same director and producer and starring Robert Taylor, coming between Ivanhoe (1952) and The Adventures of Quentin Durward (1955). All three were made at MGM's British studios at Borehamwood, near London and partly filmed on location. The cast included Robert Taylor as Sir Lancelot, Ava Gardner as Queen Guinevere, Mel Ferrer as King Arthur, Anne Crawford as Morgan le Fay, Stanley Baker as Modred and Felix Aylmer as Merlin. The film uses the Welsh spelling for Arthur's nemesis, Modred, rather than the more common Mordred.

In addition to the same producer, director and star, the first two films in the trilogy had the same cinematographer (F. A. "Freddie" Young), composer (Miklós Rózsa), art director (Alfred Junge) and costume designer (Roger Furse). The costumes for this film were executed by Elizabeth Haffenden. In 1955, she would take over from Furse as costume designer for the final film in the trilogy, Quentin Durward. Alfred Junge remained as art director.

== Plot ==
With Britain in anarchy, warring overlords Arthur Pendragon and his half-sister Morgan LeFay meet as arranged by the sorcerer Merlin to discuss how to end the bloodshed. Merlin leads them to Excalibur, a sword embedded in an anvil and stone and says that according to legend, whoever can remove the sword shall be King of England. Morgan's lover Modred attempts to draw the sword from the anvil and stone and fails, while Arthur removes the sword easily.

French knight Sir Lancelot, on his way to join Arthur, encounters the siblings Percival and Elaine, and then Arthur, to whom he pledges himself after an epic duel. Modred assembles Arthur's enemies to challenge his legitimacy to the throne of England. Arthur goes to war against Modred and wins, earning him the crown. He forms a select group of knights, and England enjoys a period of peace and prosperity. During this time, Lancelot rescues Arthur's fiancée Guinevere from being kidnapped by a mysterious knight. Morgan and Modred, who continue to harbor ill feelings against Arthur, note with interest the growing warmth between Lancelot and Guinevere.

To distance himself from Guinevere, Lancelot marries Elaine and rides north to defend England's border with Scotland, while Percival, now a knight of the Round Table, goes in search of the Holy Grail. Modred urges Arthur's enemies in Scotland to make peace so that Lancelot will be exposed as Guinevere's lover, and Morgan assassinates Merlin, who is aware of the affair, to prevent him from vetoeing Lancelot's recall. After Elaine's death in childbirth and Arthur's summons, Lancelot returns to Camelot.

Late one night, feeling jealous after seeing Lancelot kiss Vivien, Guinevere goes to his quarters. Modred's men soon arrive to arrest them for high treason, but Lancelot and Guinevere manage to escape. They are tried in absentia and declared guilty. Lancelot later returns to surrender, and when he professes his chaste love for Guinevere, Arthur revokes their death sentence. Infuriated, Modred turns the other knights against Arthur, leading to a return of civil war. A truce is briefly agreed upon but collapses almost immediately when a knight draws his sword to kill a snake, sparking the Battle of Camlann.

Mortally wounded in the battle, Arthur asks Lancelot to destroy Modred and give Guinevere his love and forgiveness. Also at Arthur's bidding, Lancelot casts Excalibur into the sea from the cliff where Arthur first drew it from the stone. He goes to the nunnery at Amesbury and delivers Arthur's message, then rides on to Modred's castle and challenges him to mortal combat. Lancelot kills Modred and leaves his body in the hands of the grieving Morgan LeFay.

Lancelot and Percival return to Camelot and the empty chamber where the Knights of the Round Table had met. There, they are vouchsafed a vision of the Holy Grail, and the voice of God grants them forgiveness and a benediction for their actions.

=== Plot notes ===
In this film, Arthur's half-sister Morgan le Fay is portrayed as Mordred's lover. In most legends, Modred is the son of Morgause, another of King Arthur's half-sisters. Also, Percival is said to be brother of Elaine of Corbenic, a relationship not found in Arthurian literature.

== Cast ==
- Robert Taylor as Lancelot
- Ava Gardner as Guinevere
- Mel Ferrer as King Arthur
- Anne Crawford as Morgan le Fay
- Stanley Baker as Modred
- Felix Aylmer as Merlin
- Maureen Swanson as Elaine
- Gabriel Woolf as Percival
- Anthony Forwood as Gareth
- Robert Urquhart as Gawaine
- Niall MacGinnis as Green Knight
- Ann Hanslip as Nan
- Jill Clifford as Bronwyn
- Stephen Vercoe as Agravaine
- Howard Marion-Crawford as Simon *
- John Brooking as Bedivere *
- Peter Gawthorne as Bishop *
- Alan Tilverne as Steward *
- John Sherman as Lambert *
- Dana Wynter as Morgan le Fay's servant [as Dagmar Wunter] *
- Mary Germaine as Brigid *
- Martin Wyldeck as John *
- Barry MacKay as Green Knight's first squire *
- Derek Tansley as Green Knight's second squire *
- Roy Russell as Leogrance *
- Gwendoline Evans as Enid *
- Michel de Lutry as Dancer *

All names with an asterisk (*) are credited on the "Cast" page (p62) of Knights of the Round Table: A Story of King Arthur - Text based on the Metro-Goldwyn-Mayer film (Ward, Lock • London and Melbourne) [1954]

=== Cast notes ===
Some performers - the first two here appearing in several scenes and with several lines to speak - were uncredited. These include: Ralph Truman as King Marr of the Picts, Henry Oscar as King Mark of Cornwall, Desmond Llewelyn as a herald, and Patricia Owens as Lady Vivien. Valentine Dyall spoke the opening narration.

== Production ==
The film had some sequences shot near Tintagel Castle, Cornwall, with local people as extras. Scenes for the first battle were shot at Luttrellstown Castle Estate in Co. Dublin, Ireland. Woodland scenes and the hawking scenes were shot at Ashridge Forest, Herts. The Torquilstone Castle set designed by Alfred Junge for Ivanhoe (1952) was expanded and re-dressed as Camelot. Most of the indoor filming was at MGM-British Studios, Borehamwood, Herts. George Sanders was originally cast as Modred but fell ill prior to shooting and was replaced by Stanley Baker, who had just made an impression in The Cruel Sea. There is a scene at the (recreated in studio) Stonehenge Circle when Robert Taylor easily topples over one of the gigantic stones!.

The film was apparently shot on Eastmancolor stock, like Quentin Durward (1955), but it was advertised only as being 'in COLOR magnificence'. The film itself credits no color process. IMDb attributes the prints to Technicolor's laboratory, but it is not listed as one of the corporation's film prints in Fred E Basten's book Glorious Technicolor.

Production was interrupted by labor disputes when two hundred extras (all members of the British extras' union) struck, demanding a pay increase. After a month-long strike that affected other productions, MGM finally agreed to meet the union's demands.

MGM was sued for $5 million for plagiarism in 1956 with a claim that the film was based on a script submitted to them in the 1930s. The judge ruled that both the film and the earlier script were based on Le Morte d'Arthur and Alfred, Lord Tennyson's Idylls of the King and "they did not use identical angles in developing the story", and rejected the claim.

== Film reception ==
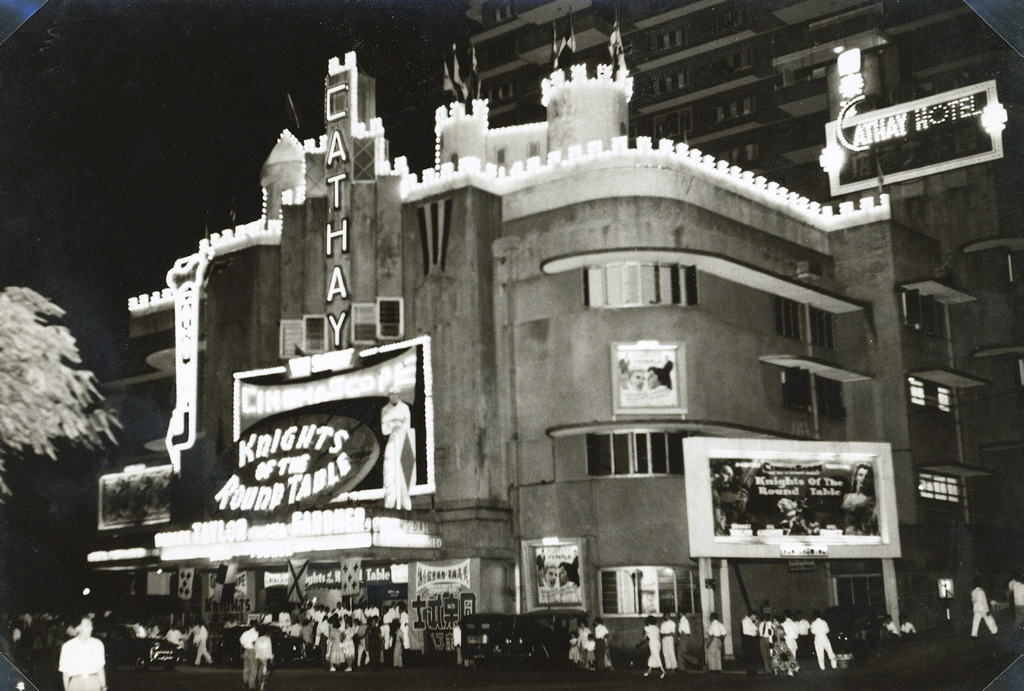
The film being shown in Singapore in 1954.

=== Box office ===
According to MGM records, the film earned $4,518,000 in the US and Canada and $3,578,000 elsewhere, resulting in a profit of $1,641,000.

According to Kinematograph Weekly the film was a "money maker" at the British box office in 1954.

=== Responses ===
Review aggregator Rotten Tomatoes reports that 67% of six surveyed critics gave Knights of the Round Table a positive review; the average rating was 6/10.

Moreover, Knights of the Round Table has received mixed reviews from the majority of critics. Bosley Crowther of The New York Times found Knights of the Round Table to be a refreshing, enjoyable film that resembled "a spectacular, richly costumed Western film", stating that the new CinemaScope technology brought the film to life. Decent Films Guide reviewer Steven D. Greydanus gave the film a "B", writing that "a solid adaptation of the King Arthur legend, Knights of the Round Table benefits from its colorful pageantry and strongly Christian milieu, including a royal Catholic wedding and a transcendent moment of revelation involving the Holy Grail". Filmink argued Maureen Swanson's "subplot is one of the best things about the (not very good) movie".

=== Awards and nominations ===
Knights of the Round Table was nominated for two Academy Awards for Best Art Direction-Set Decoration, Color (Alfred Junge, Hans Peters, John Jarvis) and Sound Recording (A. W. Watkins). It was also nominated for the Grand Prix at the 1954 Cannes Film Festival.

== Bibliography ==
Knights of the Round Table: A Story of King Arthur - Text based on the Metro-Goldwyn-Mayer CinemaScope film (Ward, Lock • London and Melbourne) [1954]

Both the crew and cast credits published at the front (crew) and back (cast) of the book are much fuller than those in the U.S. prints. They appear to come from variant U.K. prints prepared for British cinemas.

== Soundtrack ==
Contractual obligations required that Miklos Rozsa's score had to be recorded in England (by the London Symphony Orchestra conducted by Muir Mathieson) as well as being recorded in Hollywood by Rozsa himself. This version of the score may have been used in British prints. Currently only a U.S. print is available on DVD.

== Comic book adaptation ==
- Dell Four Color #540 (March 1954). Full-color photo-cover • 34 pages, 33 in full-color • Drawn by Dick Rockwell • Copyright 1954 by Loew's Incorporated [Authorised movie tie-in]
