= The Clairvoyant (1935 film) =

1935 film by Maurice Elvey

- Film poster
- Directed by: Maurice Elvey
- Written by: Ernst Lothar (novel); Charles Bennett; Bryan Edgar Wallace
- Produced by: Michael Balcon (uncredited)
- Starring: Claude Rains; Fay Wray; Jane Baxter
- Cinematography: Glen MacWilliams
- Edited by: Paul Capon
- Music by: Arthur Benjamin
- Production company: Gaumont British
- Distributed by: Gaumont British (UK); Fox Film Corporation (US)
- Release date: 15 July 1935 (US)
- Running time: 81 minutes
- Country: United Kingdom
- Language: English

The Clairvoyant (US title: The Evil Mind) is a 1935 British drama film directed by Maurice Elvey and starring Claude Rains, Fay Wray, and Jane Baxter. It was written by Charles Bennett and Bryan Edgar Wallace based on the novel of the same title by Ernst Lothar, and made at Islington Studios with sets were designed by the German art director Alfred Junge.

Bennett called it "a very good picture indeed".

== Plot ==
An American going by the stage name of Maximus, "King of the Mind Readers", travels to England with his parents and his wife Rene to perform a music hall mind-reading act. During the act, Rene works as his assistant, using a secret code to help sell the illusion. However, when he sees a woman named Christine Shawn in the audience, and his act becomes reality. He is able to tell what is in a sealed letter without Rene's assistance.

Maximus does not think much of it, until he and Christine meet by chance on a train and he foresees an impending crash. He pulls the emergency cord to stop the train, but very few people believe him. He, his family and Christine disembark, and, minutes later, the train crashes. Christine tells her father, who owns a newspaper. He publishes the story, making Maximus famous.

Maximus realizes that his power only works when Christine is near. As they spend more time together, Christine falls in love with him and Rene becomes jealous. Maximus' mother believes that no good can come of this new gift, but Maximus pays little attention, enjoying his well-paid success.

Another of his well-publicized predictions comes true: a 100-to-1 long shot wins The Derby. He chooses to ignore his own prophecy of his mother's death; when it comes true, he is so distraught that he decides to follow her wishes and abandon his ability. He feels compelled to act, however, when he foresees a great mining disaster. However, he is unable to convince the mining company to evacuate the mine. When the disaster occurs, hundreds are killed and more are missing and presumed dead.

He is publicly accused of causing the accident and is brought to trial. The prosecution claims that Maximus himself caused both tragedies, by delaying the train and by panicking the miners into making a mistake. Maximus predicts in the courtroom that the missing miners will be found alive. When this becomes true, he is released. Maximus decides to give up his gift, and he and Rene slip away into obscurity.

== Cast ==
- Claude Rains as Maximus
- Fay Wray as Rene
- Jane Baxter as Christine Shawn
- Mary Clare as Maximus's mother
- Ben Field as Simon
- Athole Stewart as Lord Southwood
- C. Denier Warren as James J. Bimeter
- Felix Aylmer as prosecutor
- Donald Calthrop as derelict
- Margaret Davidge as lodging housekeeper
- Carleton Hobbs as racing commentator
- Graham Moffatt as page boy
- Jack Raine as customs officer
- D.J. Williams as juror

== Reception ==
The Monthly Film Bulletin wrote: "The film fails because it is not sufficiently melodramatic to be just entertainment nor sufficiently thought out to offer any solution of the problem it chooses to raise, so that while it contains many excellent sequences and many dramatic incidents, particularly the shaft sequence, and while Claude Rains gives an excellent performance and almost carries the film through, the film often drags and does not grip the attention as it is obviously intended to. The human interest ... needed better acting than that provided by Fay Wray and Jane Baxter."

Kine Weekly wrote: "Cleverness in direction permits every dramatic step in the thematic development to be clearly defined, and the most gripping situations to be in corporated with good showmanship into the denouement. There is, in fact, no doubt as to the ability of this film to make good at the box-office, it has a little of everything, great story, fascinating subject matter, strong cast, an attractive title and star values. In brief, it is an excellent general booking; grand entertainment for all classes."

Variety wrote: "The Clairvoyant is an effort to fit material to Claude Rains but a mild excuse as screen entertainment. It is an absurdly fanciful story ... Rains has done better than in this one, part is against him. Fay Wray is satisfactory as his wife, and Jane Baxter fits as the other girl. Dialog is ordinary but undoubtedly handicapped by motive of the story."
