= A Cuckoo in the Nest (film) =

1933 British film by Tom Walls

- Opening title card
- Directed by: Tom Walls
- Written by: A. R. Rawlinson; Ben Travers (screenplay)
- Based on: A Cuckoo in the Nest; 1925 play by Ben Travers
- Produced by: Ian Dalrymple; Angus MacPhail
- Starring: Tom Walls; Ralph Lynn; Yvonne Arnaud; Robertson Hare
- Cinematography: Glen MacWilliams; Freddie Young
- Edited by: Helen Lewis
- Music by: Louis Levy
- Production company: Gaumont British Picture Corporation
- Distributed by: Woolf and Freedman
- Release date: November 1933
- Running time: 85 minutes
- Country: United Kingdom
- Language: English

A Cuckoo in the Nest is a 1933 British film directed by Tom Walls and starring Walls, Ralph Lynn and Yvonne Arnaud. It was written by Ben Travers and A.R. Rawlinson based on the 1925 Aldwych farce of the same title by Travers, and was made at Lime Grove Studios with sets designed by Alfred Junge. The film was remade in 1954 as Fast and Loose.

== Plot ==
Peter and Barbara Wyckham plan to travel by railway from London to a country house in Somerset, but Peter misses the train. Another intending traveller in a similar plight is Marguerite Hickett, an old friend of Peter's from the days before their marriages. They decide to hire a motor car and drive to Somerset, but the car breaks down and they seek refuge at the local inn. Only one bedroom is available, and as it is very clear that the landlady, Mrs Spoker, will not admit an unmarried couple, Peter and Marguerite check in as husband and wife.

Barbara jumps to the conclusion that Peter and Marguerite have run away together. First her parents, Major and Mrs Bone, and then Marguerite's husband and finally Barbara descend on the inn. It becomes clear to everyone that Peter and Marguerite are blameless, and both couples are reconciled.

== Cast ==
Cast members marked * were the creators of the roles in the original stage production.

- Tom Walls* as Major Bone
- Ralph Lynn* as Peter Wyckham
- Yvonne Arnaud* as Marguerite Hickett
- Mary Brough* as Mrs Spoker
- Robertson Hare* as the Rev. Cathcart Sloley-Jones
- Gordon James* as Noony
- Veronica Rose as Barbara Wyckham
- Grace Edwin* as Mrs Bone
- Mark Daly as Pinhorn
- Cecil Parker as Claude Hickett
- Roger Livesey* as Alfred
- Norah Howard as Gladys
- Frank Pettingell as landlord
- Joan Brierley as Kate

== Reception ==
Kine Weekly wrote: "This picture never escapes from the canons of conventional farce nor has full advantage been taken of the greater scope offered by the sereen, but an spite of this the film builds up humour of an essentially English and popular character. A few dull paiches are met betore the story gets fully into its stride, bit once the angle is complete the complexion changes and the fun, cunningly spiced, remains smooth until the neat chimax as reached."

The Daily Film Renter wrote: "Riotous farce in best Ben Travers tradition, giving scope for stars and familiar stage team to put over generous helping of their characteristic nonsense, with Walls immense as alcoholic old major. Situations, gags and dialogue cut to well-tried pattern, with backgrounds and incidentals emphasising farce element. Bull's-eye for the hordes of Walls-Lynn fans and all who enjoy purely British humour."

Reviewing the re-issue of the film in 1942, The Monthly Film Bulletin wrote: "Though this film was originally made in 1933, age certainly has not withered its entertainment value. Only the feminine garments and hair styles give it away. Tom Walls, as director and in his part of Barbara's alcoholic father, does not lose the smallest opportunity of getting every ounce of fun from it."
