= Barry MacKay (actor) =

English actor (1906–1985)

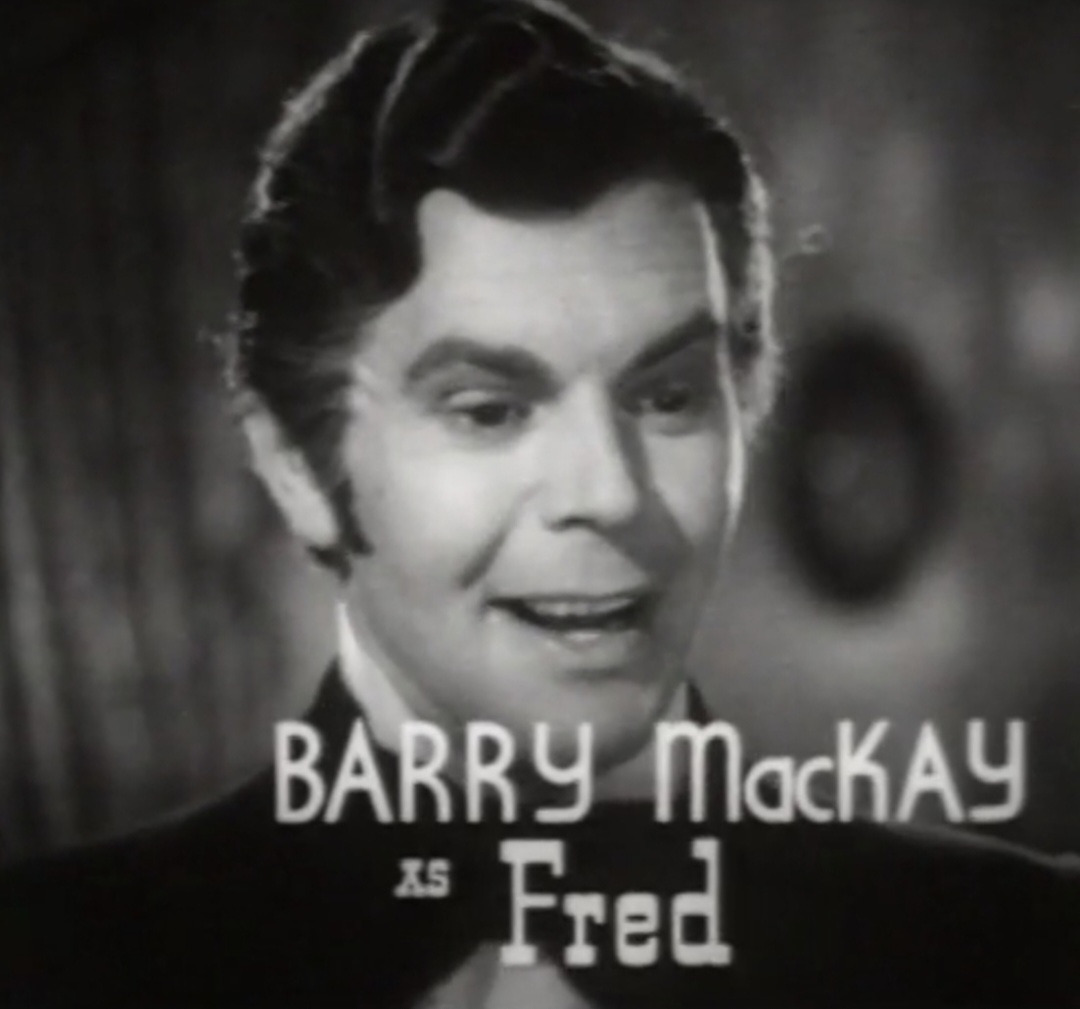
- MacKay in the trailer for A Christmas Carol (1938)
- Born: Barry Leonard Graham Reay-Mackey; 8 January 1906; London, England
- Died: 12 December 1985 (aged 79); Chelsea, London, England
- Occupation: Actor
- Years active: 1933–1955
- Spouse: Natalie Hall

Barry MacKay (born Barry Leonard Graham Reay-Mackey; 8 January 1906 – 12 December 1985) was an English actor.

He was most prominently seen in light comedic roles in the British cinema of the 1930s and is perhaps best known as Jessie Matthews' leading man in Evergreen (1934), Gangway (1937) and Sailing Along (1938). On stage he performed at the Comedy Theatre, London, in the Green Room Rags of 2 December 1934, opposite Ann Todd in the sketch Every Twenty Thousand Years.

Other notable roles include Lieutenant Somerville in Brown on Resolution (1935) and as Fred, Scrooge's nephew, in MGM's A Christmas Carol (1938), the latter being one of two films he made in the US; the other was the lead role in a B-picture, Smuggled Cargo (1939). After these films and serving in the Canadian navy during World War II, followed by stage work, there was a long gap in his film career, until he reappeared as a character actor in the 1950s, making his last film (Timeslip a.k.a. The Atomic Man) in 1955.

MacKay also appeared in the 1954 Sheldon Reynolds-produced Sherlock Holmes television series. He portrayed Reggie "Sardines" Taunton in episode 17; "The Case of the Laughing Mummy".

== Filmography ==
Year	Film	Role	Notes
1933	The 1002nd Night	Ganem	Film debut, Voice
1934	Evergreen	Tommy Thompson	
1934	Passing Shadows	Jim Lawrence	
1934	The Private Life of Don Juan	Rodrigo	
1934	Forbidden Territory	Michael Farringdon	
1935	Oh, Daddy!	Jimmy Ellison	
1935	Me and Marlborough	Dick Welch	
1935	The Private Secretary	Douglas Cattermole	
1935	Brown on Resolution	Lieutenant Somerville	
1937	The Great Barrier	Steve	
1937	Glamorous Night	Anthony Allan	
1937	Gangway	Bob Deering	
1937	Who Killed John Savage?	Anthony Benedict	
1938	Sailing Along	Steve Barnes	
1938	A Christmas Carol	Fred	
1939	Smuggled Cargo	Gerry Clayton	
1952	The Pickwick Papers	Mr. Snubbins	
1953	Grand National Night	Sergeant Gibson	
1953	Knights of the Round Table	Green Knight's Squire	Uncredited
1955	Orders are Orders	R. S. M. Benson	
1955	Sherlock Holmes	Reggie Taunton	Episode: The Case of the Laughing Mummy
1955	Timeslip	Inspector Hammond	Final film, Uncredited
