= Nation Aflame =

1937 film directed by Victor Halperin

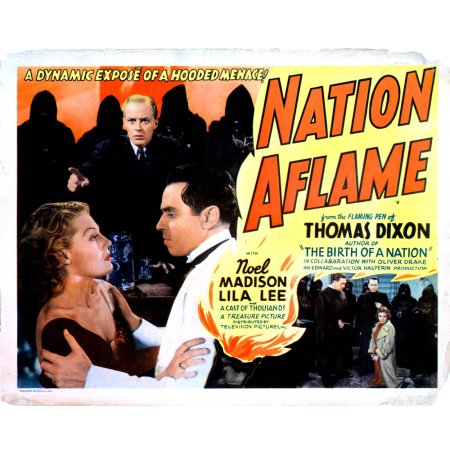
- Poster for the film
- Directed by: Victor Halperin
- Screenplay by: Oliver Drake; William Lively
- Story by: Thomas Dixon; Oliver Drake; Victor Halperin; Leon d'Usseau
- Produced by: Edward Halperin
- Starring: Noel Madison; Norma Trelvar; Lila Lee
- Cinematography: Arthur Martinelli
- Edited by: Holbrook Todd; Frank Bayes
- Music by: Edward Kilenyi
- Production company: Treasure Pictures
- Distributed by: Treasure Pictures; Television Pictures
- Release date: October 16, 1937 (US)
- Running time: 76 minutes
- Country: United States
- Language: English

Nation Aflame is a 1937 American drama film. Directed by Victor Halperin, the film stars Noel Madison, Norma Trelvar, and Lila Lee. It was released on October 16, 1937.

== Cast ==
- Noel Madison as Frank Sandino, aka Sands
- Norma Trelvar as Wynne Adams
- Lila Lee as Mona Burtis
- Douglas Walton as Tommy Franklin
- Harry Holman as Roland Adams
- Arthur W. Singley as Bob Sherman
- Snub Pollard as Wolfe
- Earle Hodgins as Wilson
- Si Wills as Walker
- Roger Williams as Dave Burtis
