= Dwight Taylor (writer) =

American journalist (1903–1986)

- Born: Dwight Oliver Taylor; January 1, 1903; New York City, U.S.
- Died: December 31, 1986 (aged 83); Woodland Hills, California, U.S.
- Occupations: Playwright; screenwriter; author; journalist
- Years active: 1928–1967
- Spouses: Marigold Lockhart Langworthy (m. 1929 – 19??); Natalie Visart (m. 1946; died 1986)
- Children: 4
- Parent(s): Laurette Taylor (mother); J. Hartley Manners (stepfather)

Dwight Oliver Taylor (January 1, 1903 – December 31, 1986) was an American author, playwright, and film/television screenwriter.

== Background ==
Dwight Oliver Taylor was the son of actress Laurette Taylor and her husband, Charles A. Taylor. Dwight Taylor attended Lawrenceville School in Lawrence Township, New Jersey where he began drawing and painting and wrote a book of poetry.

After refusing an opportunity to work as a cub reporter for The New York World, he began his career as a journalist for The New Yorker magazine, serving as one of the first editors for their "Talk of the Town". He began screenwriting for Hollywood films in 1930 and for television in 1953. His first produced play was Don't Tell George (1928). Other plays included such as Lipstick and Gay Divorce.

Taylor's first screenplay was Jailbreak. First National Pictures bought the project in 1929 while it was still in manuscript form and had Alfred A. Cohn and Henry McCarty adapt it to become the 1930 film Numbered Men starring Conrad Nagel and Bernice Claire. Gay Divorce was adapted into a Broadway musical by Cole Porter.

In 1934, RKO Studios, which renamed it The Gay Divorcee to appease the censors, filmed it with Fred Astaire and Ginger Rogers. He was a founding member, and had served one term as president, of the Writers Guild of America, West.

== Death ==
On December 31, 1986, one day before his 84th birthday, Dwight Taylor died of a heart attack at the Motion Picture and Television Hospital in Woodland Hills, California where he had resided since 1981, thus achieving a rare feat of being born on New Year's Day and dying on New Year's Eve.

He had been widowed three months earlier by his second wife, former Hollywood costume designer Natalie Visart (born Natalie Visart Schenkelberg; 1910–1986), with whom he had a daughter, Laurel. His first wife was Marigold Lockhart Taylor (née Langworthy; born July 22, 1901 – died 1951?), whom he married on May 25, 1929, and by whom he had three children (Andrew, Audrey, and Jeffrey).

== Filmography ==
=== Film ===
- Numbered Men (1930)
- Secrets of a Secretary (1931)
- Are You Listening? (1932)
- If I Were Free (1933)
- Today We Live (1933)
- Lady by Choice (1934)
- The Gay Divorcee (1934)
- Stingaree (1934)
- Long Lost Father (1934)
- Top Hat (1935)
- Paris in Spring (1935)
- Follow the Fleet (1936)
- Gangway (1937)
- Head over Heels (1937)
- The Amazing Mr. Williams (1939)
- When Tomorrow Comes (1939)
- Rhythm on the River (1940)
- I Wake Up Screaming (1941)
- Kiss the Boys Goodbye (1941)
- Nightmare (1942)
- Conflict (1945)
- The Thin Man Goes Home (1945)
- We're Not Married! (1952)
- Something to Live For (1952)
- Pickup on South Street (1953)
- Vicki (1953)
- Special Delivery (1955)
- Boy on a Dolphin (1957)
- Interlude (1957)
- The Cape Town Affair (1967)

=== Television ===
- The Loretta Young Show (1 episode, 1953), "Trial Run"
- Schlitz Playhouse (1 episode, 1957), "The Girl in the Grass" (1957)
- The Thin Man (2 episodes, 1957), "Fatal Cliche", "Angels in Paradise"
- 77 Sunset Strip (1 episode, 1959), "A Check Will Do Nicely"
- Batman (1 episode, 1967), "Louie, the Lilac"

=== Theatre ===
- Don't Tell George (1928)
- Phyllis Feels Frlghtened (1928)
- Trevelyn's Ghost (1929)
- Lipstick (1929)
- Gay Divorce (1932)
- Paris in Spring (1935)
- Where Do We Go from Here? (1938)
- Out of this World (1950) (co-written with Cole Porter)
- Billie: a play in three acts (1960)

== Bibliography ==
- Some Pierrots Come from Behind the Moon (1923) (Poetry)
- Joy Ride (1959) (novel)
- What Sank the Dreamboat
- Blood and Thunder (1962) (novel)
