= Sailing Along =

- Directed by: Sonnie Hale
- Written by: Sonnie Hale (scenario); Lesser Samuels (adaptation & dialogue)
- Based on: original story by Selwyn Jepson
- Produced by: Michael Balcon (uncredited)
- Starring: Jessie Matthews; Barry MacKay; Jack Whiting; Roland Young
- Cinematography: Glen MacWilliams
- Edited by: Al Barnes
- Music by: music & lyrics: Arthur Johnston; Maurice Sigler musical director: Louis Levy
- Production company: Gaumont British Picture Corporation
- Distributed by: General Film Distributors (UK)
- Release dates: 17 April 1938 (London, UK)
- Running time: 97 minutes
- Country: United Kingdom
- Language: English

Sailing Along is a 1938 British musical comedy film directed by Sonnie Hale and starring Jessie Matthews, Barry MacKay, Jack Whiting, Roland Young, Frank Pettingell, Noel Madison and Alastair Sim. It was written by Lesser Samuels and Hale based on an original story by Selwyn Jepson.

The film includes song and dance routines set either on barges or on the dock edge. It was the final musical film to feature Matthews in a lead role.

== Plot ==
Kay Martin works on a Thames barge with her adopted father, Skipper Barnes and his son Steve, a would-be commodities analyst. She is singing and dancing on deck as they sail past soup millionaire Anthony Gulliver; he at once offers to put her name in lights and introduces her to star/producer Dicky Randall and his flirtatious wife Stephanie, who sneers at her and quarrels with Dicky before leaving with Steve, who has turned up on Kay's trail.

Anthony and his sister Victoria train Kay in social graces; she and Dicky enjoy themselves at clubs. When Kay and Andrew turn up for the Skipper's birthday party on the barge, Steve is angered to see her with furs and champagne; he plans to make enough money to buy a schooner and sail away, so Andrew hires him as an analyst. He does get rich, and Andrew finances Barging In, a revue with Kay and Dicky. It is a hit, but after the first night, mistakenly convinced she loves Dicky, Steve leaves for the docks. Finding out, Kay hands over her role to her understudy and rushes off to join Steve on board.

== Cast ==
- Jessie Matthews as Kay Martin
- Barry MacKay as Steve Barnes
- Jack Whiting as Dicky Randall
- Roland Young as Anthony Gulliver, the rich father
- Noel Madison as Windy
- Frank Pettingell as Skipper Barnes
- Alastair Sim as Sylvester, the artist
- Athene Seyler as Victoria Gulliver
- Margaret Vyner as Stephanie
- William Dewhurst as Winton
- Peggy Novak as Jill
- Patrick Barr as seaman at birthday party
- Arthur Denton as man auditioning chorus girls

== Production ==
Sailing Along was filmed at Pinewood Studios from August to December 1937. For the last big dance number, which lasted seven minutes on screen, the camera followed Whiting and Matthews for nearly a mile, and the set was so large that it had to be built across two studios. Including rehearsals, the pair danced an estimated twenty miles to complete that single scene.

== Release ==
The film opened at the Gaumont Haymarket on 17 April 1938, and was generally released on 29 August 1938.

== Critical reception ==
In a contemporary review, The Monthly Film Bulletin wrote, "The best features of the film are the songs and the dances which are cleverly treated, particularly in the final sequence where Kay and Dicky perform a really original and brilliantly executed tap ballet. Jessie Matthews acts Kay with unrestrained gaiety and fire, sings adequately and dances superbly. Jack Whiting, as Dicky, matches her in dancing ability and outshines her in singing and acting, Barry Mackay tries hard not to make Steve too imbecile, while Roland Young (Gulliver) and Athene Seyler, as his prim sister, serve up a banquet of laughs from the few crumbs that fall their way."

In his review for The Era on 27 January 1938, R.B. Marriott applauded Hale's direction as "swift, gay and witty", and added that "Sailing Along was certainly the most polished romantic comedy with music ever made in our studios: and for vitality, deftness and general entertainment value it equals any, and is superior to, many that have come from that over-rated motion picture making town across the Atlantic Ocean."
