= Head over Heels (1937 film) =

1937 film

- Directed by: Sonnie Hale
- Written by: scenario: Marjorie Gaffney adaptation: Dwight Taylor & Fred Thompson dialogue: Dwight Taylor
- Based on: play by Francis de Croisset
- Produced by: S.C. Balcon
- Starring: Jessie Matthews; Robert Flemyng; Louis Borel; Romney Brent
- Cinematography: Glen MacWilliams
- Edited by: Al Barnes
- Music by: words & music: Mack Gordon & Harry Revel musical director: Louis Levy
- Production company: Gaumont British
- Distributed by: Gaumont British Distributors
- Release dates: 15 January 1937 (London, England)
- Running time: 78 minutes
- Country: United Kingdom
- Language: English

Head over Heels (U.S. title: Head over Heels in Love) is a 1937 British musical film directed by Sonnie Hale and starring Jessie Matthews, Robert Flemyng and Louis Borel. It was written by Marjorie Gaffney, Fred Thompson and Dwight Taylor, adapted from the 1931 play Pierre ou Jack by Francis de Croisset.

== Production ==
The film was made at the Lime Grove Studios in London with sets designed by Alfred Junge.

== Plot ==
In Paris, nightclub entertainer Jeanne falls in love with her dance partner, the idle, womanising Marcel. When Marcel runs off with rich and glamorous film star Norma, Jeanne's true love Pierre comes to her aid, and helps find her work on the radio. After becoming a successful radio star, Jeanne becomes attractive once more to Marcel, but the faithful Pierre cannot risk losing her again.

== Cast ==
- Jessie Matthews as Jeanne Colbert
- Robert Flemyng as Pierre
- Louis Borel as Marcel Larimour
- Romney Brent as Matty
- Whitney Bourne as Norma Langtry
- Paul Leyssac as Max
- Eliot Makeham as Martin
- Fred Duprez as Norma's manager
- Edward Cooper as Charles

== Critical reception ==
The Monthly Film Bulletin wrote: "This picture, set in Paris, but strongly British in characterisation, is treated too heavily for its type. The hero is gloomy, the heroine has a brave smile and a lump in her throat, while Marcel, on whose conquering charm so much of the story hangs, produces an effect which is purely fatuous. There are half a dozen good jokes, the broadcasting scenes are amusing and Jessie Matthews sings some very attractive songs, but there is a definite lack of the sparkle and gaiety which this class of picture needs."

Kine Weekly wrote: "Although actual story appeal is not its strong point, this production goes all out to exhibit the popular star in a sympathetic role which fits her personality like a glove."

Writing for The Spectator in 1937, Graham Greene called the film "a moribund tale of poor young people with ambitions in Parisian garrets, concluding that that the film was one of the "worst English film[s] of the quarter".

The Radio Times wrote, "Having made her movie name under the direction of Victor Saville, Jessie Matthews went to work for her four-time co-star and then husband Sonnie Hale, whose first outing behind the camera this was," but concluded, "Hale's inexperience shows away from the musical numbers. But it's engaging enough, and Alfred Junge's sets give the film a sophistication too often missing from British musicals of the period."
