= Sonnie Hale =

English actor and director (1902–1959)

- Cigarette card, 1934
- Born: John Robert Hale-Monro; 1 May 1902; London, England
- Died: 9 June 1959 (aged 57); London, England
- Occupations: Actor; screenwriter; director
- Spouses: Evelyn Laye (m. 1926; div. 1930) Jessie Matthews (m. 1931; div. 1944) Mary Kelsey (m. 1947; div. 1957)
- Children: 5, including Joanna Monro
- Relatives: Binnie Hale (sister)

John Robert Hale-Monro (1 May 1902 – 9 June 1959), known as Sonnie Hale, was an English actor, screenwriter, and director.

== Early life ==
John Robert Hale-Monro was born in Kensington, London, the son of Belle Reynolds and actor Robert Hale. His sister, Binnie Hale, was also an actress. Hale was educated at Beaumont College.

== Career ==
He worked chiefly in musical and revue theatre, but also acted in several films with occasional screenwriting or directing credits. He first performed on stage at the London Pavilion in 1921 in the chorus of the revue Fun of the Fayre. A major personal investment in a show to tour the country planned for late 1939 proved financially ruinous due to the outbreak of war and the subsequent closure of most theatres. His slight acquaintance Evelyn Waugh advised him against such an investment. His reply was reported to be the sardonic "War is good for business, don't you know!"

Hale's play The French Mistress premiered at the Prince of Wales Theatre, Cardiff in May 1955. It later enjoyed a long West End run, before being adapted into the film A French Mistress.

== Personal life and death ==
He was married three times, to:

- The actress Evelyn Laye (1926–1930).
- The actress and dancer Jessie Matthews (1931–1944).
- Mary Kelsey (1945–1957)

He left his first marriage to Laye for Matthews, which led to a backlash among the British public and caused a scandal.

By his second marriage, he had one son (who died at birth) and one adopted daughter Catherine, Countess Grixoni (1935–2024); by his third marriage he had one son, John Robert Hale-Monro (1946–2013) and a daughter. He also had a daughter, Joanna Monro (born 1956), from a subsequent relationship with the actress Frances Bennett.

Hale died on 9 June 1959 in London from myelofibrosis, aged 57.

== Selected theatre performances ==
- Little Nellie Kelly (London production) - 1923 (as Sidney Potter)
- Mercenary Mary - 1925 (as Jerry Warner)
- One Dam Thing After Another (revue) - 1927
- This Year of Grace (revue) - 1928
- Wake Up and Dream (revue) - 1929
- Ever Green - 1930 (as Tommy Thompson)
- Hold My Hand - 1931 (as Pop Curry)
- Come Out to Play (revue) - 1940
- Maid of the Mountains - 1942 (as Tonio)
- One, Two, Three (revue) - 1947
- The Perfect Woman - 1948 (as Freddie Cavendish)
- Rainbow Square - 1951 (as Peppi)
- Lady Be Good - 1955
- The French Mistress - 1959 (as John Crawley)

== Filmography ==
=== Actor ===
- Happy Ever After (1932)
- Tell Me Tonight (1932)
- Early to Bed (1933)
- Friday the Thirteenth (1933)
- Evergreen (1934)
- Wild Boy (1934)
- Are You a Mason? (1934)
- My Song for You (1934)
- Mon coeur t'appelle (1934)
- My Heart Is Calling (1935)
- Marry the Girl (1935)
- First a Girl (1935)
- It's Love Again (1936)
- The Gaunt Stranger (1938)
- Let's Be Famous (1939)
- Fiddlers Three (1944)
- London Town (1946)

=== Director ===
- Head Over Heels (1937)
- Gangway (1937)
- Sailing Along (1938)
