= Me and Marlborough =

1935 film

- Opening title card
- Directed by: Victor Saville
- Written by: Marjorie Gaffney; Ian Hay; W. P. Lipscomb; Reginald Pound
- Produced by: Michael Balcon
- Starring: Cicely Courtneidge; Tom Walls; Barry MacKay
- Cinematography: Curt Courant; Charles Van Enger
- Edited by: Michael Gordon
- Music by: Louis Levy; Jack Beaver
- Production company: Gaumont British
- Distributed by: Gaumont British Distributors
- Release date: 25 July 1935
- Running time: 84 minutes
- Country: United Kingdom
- Language: English

Me and Marlborough is a 1935 British comedy film, directed by Victor Saville, and starring Cicely Courtneidge, Tom Walls, Barry MacKay, Peter Gawthorne, Henry Oscar and Cecil Parker.

== Plot ==
Sergeant Cummings searches Kit Ross's pub for a deserter drummer boy. When he finds the lad, Kit leads the pub patrons in attacking the sergeant's men, and the young man gets away, for which she is put in stocks. While there, she plans her impending wedding to Dick Welch. However, Cummings gets his revenge. On the night of the wedding, he tricks Dick into taking a shilling, which means he has enlisted in the army. She watches as a ship takes him to the fighting. Undaunted, she disguises herself as a man named Simon and joins up with the Duke of Marlborough's army in Flanders to find her missing husband.

== Cast ==
- Cicely Courtneidge as Kit Ross
- Tom Walls as Duke of Marlborough
- Barry MacKay as Dick Welch
- Alfred Drayton as Sergeant Bull
- Iris Ashley as Josephine
- Ivor McLaren as Sergeant Cummings
- Gibb McLaughlin as Old soldier
- Peter Gawthorne as Staff Colonel
- Cecil Parker as Colonel of the Greys
- George Merritt as Harley
- Cyril Smith as Corporal Fox
- Mickey Brantford as Ensign Coke
- Randle Ayrton as King Louis XIV
- Henry Oscar as Goultier
- Percy Walsh as Naylor
- Donald Calthrop as Drunken Yokel

== Reception ==
Writing for The Spectator, Graham Greene criticised the theatrical qualities of Courtneidge's performance, claiming that "I found myself too embarrassed by Miss Courtneidge's facial contortions to appreciate their share. Miss Courtneidge is used to throwing her effects to the back row of a theatre gallery, and the camera is not kind to her exaggerations".
