= Friday the Thirteenth (1933 film) =

1933 film

- Directed by: Victor Saville
- Written by: Sidney Gilliat; Emlyn Williams; George Moresby-White
- Produced by: Michael Balcon
- Starring: Jessie Matthews; Ralph Richardson; Max Miller; Robertson Hare
- Cinematography: Charles Van Enger
- Edited by: R. E. Dearing
- Music by: Bretton Byrd
- Production company: Gainsborough Pictures
- Distributed by: Gaumont British Distributors
- Release dates: November 1933 (London, England)
- Running time: 89 minutes
- Country: England
- Language: English

Friday the Thirteenth (also known as Friday the 13th) is a 1933 British drama film directed by Victor Saville and starring Jessie Matthews, Sonnie Hale and Muriel Aked. It was written by Sidney Gilliat, Emlyn Williams and George Moresby-White.

== Plot ==
The film depicts the lives of several passengers in the hours before they are involved in a bus crash.

== Cast ==
- Jessie Matthews as Millie
- Sonnie Hale as Alf the conductor
- Muriel Aked as Miss Twigg
- Cyril Smith - Fred the sriver
- Richard Hulton as Johnny
- Max Miller as Joe
- Alfred Drayton as the detective
- Hartley Power as American tourist
- Percy Parsons as American tourist
- Ursula Jeans as Eileen Jackson
- Eliot Makeham as Henry Jackson
- D. A. Clarke-Smith as Max
- Gibb McLaughlin as florist
- Edmund Gwenn as Mr Wakefield
- Mary Jerrold as Flora Wakefield
- Gordon Harker as Hamilton Briggs
- Emlyn Williams as William Blake
- Frank Lawton as Frank Parsons
- Belle Chrystall as Marry Summers
- O. B. Clarence as Clerk
- Robertson Hare as Ralph Lightfoot
- Martita Hunt as Agnes Lightfoot
- Leonora Corbett as Dolly
- Ralph Richardson as Horace Dawes
- Donald Calthrop as Hugh Nicholls
- Ivor McLaren as dancing instructor
- Winifred Poole as Martha
- Wally Patch as bookmaker

== Critical reception ==
The Daily Film Renter wrote: "Majority of action is told in series of flashback episodes, revealing how chance made victims share catastrophe. Episodic narrative deftly unified by Victor Saville's painstaking direction, which results in highly diverting canvas of comedy, drama, and suspense. First-class technical details, wide range of settings, and fine photography. Excellent acting by talented cast, in which Jessie Matthews, Max Miller, Robertson Hare, Gordon Harker, and Edmund Gwenn stand out. Exceptionally entertaining feature for most patrons."

Picturegoer wrote: "It is very discursive and the lives of the passengers concerned are not particularly interesting or vital; they lack dramatic import, while the humour is of the broad music-hall variety. Continuity is weak and the general impression is one of a series of interdependent sketches, none of which is really dramatically holding. The cast is a strong one, but the artistes as a whole have little or no opportunity to show to their best advantage."

== Home media ==
On 6 April 2015, Friday the Thirteenth was released on DVD as part of Volume 1 of The Jesse Matthews Revue.
