= Jessie Matthews =

English actress (1907–1981)

Jessie Matthews OBE
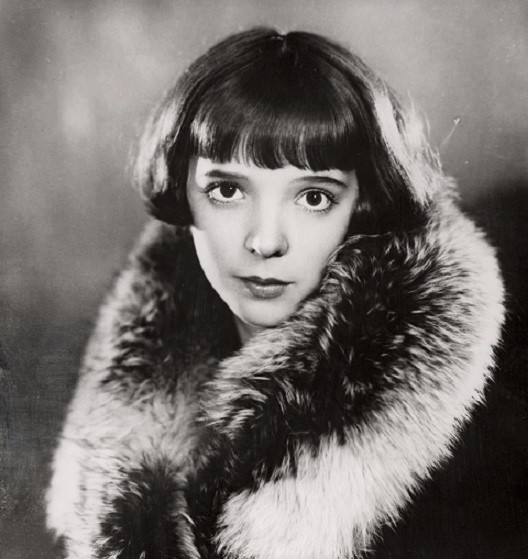
- Matthews in the 1920s.
- Born: Jessie Margaret Matthews; 11 March 1907; Soho, London, England
- Died: 19 August 1981 (aged 74); Eastcote, London, England
- Occupations: Actress; singer; dancer
- Years active: 1919–1981
- Spouses: Henry Lytton Jr. (m. 1926; div. 1930) Sonnie Hale (m. 1931; div. 1944) Brian Lewis (m. 1945; div. 1959)
- Children: Catherine, Countess Grixoni

Jessie Margaret Matthews (11 March 1907 – 19 August 1981) was an English actress, dancer and singer who rose to fame in the 1920s and 1930s, with her career continuing into the post-war period.

After a string of hit stage musicals and films in the mid-1930s, such as Evergreen, Matthews developed a following in the United States, where she was dubbed "The Dancing Divinity". Her British studio was reluctant to let go of its biggest name, however, which resulted in offers for her to work in Hollywood being repeatedly rejected.

After the decline of her film career, Matthews achieved a comeback in her native Britain when she took over the role of Mary Dale in the popular BBC Radio serial The Dales (previously known as Mrs Dale's Diary).

== Early life ==
Jessie Margaret Matthews was born on 11 March 1907 to Jane Matthews (née Townshend) in a flat above a butcher's shop at 94 Berwick Street, Soho, London, in relative poverty, the seventh of sixteen children (of whom eleven survived). Jessie's father, George Ernest Matthews, was a fruit-and-vegetable seller.

Shortly after her birth, the family moved around the corner to 5 Livonia Street. Aged five, the family again moved, this time to 11 Carlos Street, Camden Town, where she attended St Matthew's School. In 1915, Matthews and her family returned to live in Soho, at 9 William and Mary Yard, a flat above stables, which was at the top of Great Windmill Street; the buildings were later demolished. She then attended Pulteney Street London County Council School for Girls.

== Career ==
=== Beginnings ===
Matthews took dancing lessons as a child in a room above a local public house at 22 Berwick Street. She first went on stage on 29 December 1919, aged 12, in Bluebell in Fairyland, by Seymour Hicks, with music by Walter Slaughter and lyrics by Charles Taylor, at the Metropolitan Music Hall, Edgware Road, London, as a child dancer.

She made her cinema debut in 1923 in the silent film The Beloved Vagabond. She also had a small part in Straws in the Wind, released the following year, in which her sister Rosie also appeared. 1923 also saw Jessie make her West End debut when she appeared in C. B. Cochran's production of Irving Berlin's Music Box Revue at the Palace Theatre. This was followed by a part in the chorus of London Calling!, a revue by Noël Coward and Ronald Jeans presented by André Charlot.

Matthews was then in the chorus in Charlot's Review of 1924 in London. She went with the show to New York, where she was also understudy to the star, Gertrude Lawrence. The show moved to Toronto, and when Lawrence fell ill, Matthews took over the role, and received glowing reviews.

=== Early fame ===
Matthews in 1926

Matthews first achieved star status in The Charlot Show of 1926, a show which saw her dance in ballet with Anton Dolin, and in musical comedy with Henry Lytton Jr. Matthews and Lytton married the same year, but they were divorced after only a few years. During this period, she was given a £25,000 contract with Cochran, equivalent to over £1m in 2022. She made her debut as a leading lady on Broadway in The Charlot Show of 1927, a production coupled with Earl Carroll's Vanities.

In 1927, Matthews starred in One Dam Thing After Another by Ronald Jeans, a West End revue with music by Richard Rodgers and Lorenz Hart, which featured Matthews introducing their hit song "My Heart Stood Still". It was in this show that she first met her co-star Sonnie Hale. The following year, they introduced Coward's romantic duet "A Room with a View" in This Year of Grace, and her performance in the revue was acclaimed by critics. She was similarly successful in another revue Wake up and Dream (1929), in which she and Hale introduced Cole Porter's "Let's Do It, Let's Fall in Love".

Matthews' fame reached its initial height with her lead role in Cochran's 1930 stage production of Ever Green, which premiered at the Alhambra Theatre Glasgow. The musical, by Rodgers and Hart, was partly inspired by the life of music hall star Marie Lloyd and her daughter's tribute act resurrection of her mother's acclaimed Edwardian stage show as Marie Lloyd Junior. At its time, Ever Green, which included the first major revolving stage in Britain, was the most expensive musical ever mounted on a British stage. The show saw Matthews introduce another Rodgers and Hart standard, "Dancing on the Ceiling".

=== Film star ===
Matthews' first major film role was in the musical Out of the Blue (1931), but it was a commercial failure. However, the following year, she starred in There Goes the Bride, directed by Albert de Courville, which was a success. This was followed by The Man from Toronto, released the same year, and another film for de Courville, The Midshipmaid.

Matthews enjoyed great success with her appearance in the ensemble film The Good Companions (1933), an adaptation of J. B. Priestley's novel and play directed by Victor Saville. 1933 also saw her starring in Waltzes from Vienna, an operetta telling the story behind the production of "The Blue Danube" by Johann Strauss II, directed by a young Alfred Hitchcock. This was followed by another ensemble film, Friday the Thirteenth (1933), in which she appeared on screen with Hale, who was by then her husband, for the first time.

She then starred in the film version of Evergreen (1934), which featured the newly composed song "Over My Shoulder"; it would to go on to become Matthews' personal signature song, later giving its title to her autobiography and to a 21st-century musical stage show of her life.

This was followed by First a Girl (1935), in which she appears as a cross dresser, and then It's Love Again (1936), where she had an American co-star, Robert Young. Exhibitors voted her the sixth biggest star in the country that year.

Matthews then began to appear in films directed by husband: Gangway (1937), Head over Heels (1937) and Sailing Along (1938). Following the end of Hale's contract with Gaumont British, she starred in her last film for the studio, Climbing High (1938) directed by Carol Reed. In 1938, she was the fourth biggest British star at the box office.

Matthews and Hale returned to the stage in 1939 in their own musical production, I Can Take It, which had a successful provincial tour. It was due to open at the London Coliseum on 12 September, but the outbreak of the war on 3 September meant the show was cancelled.

=== World War II ===
Her warbling voice and round cheeks made her a familiar and much-loved personality to British theatre and film audiences at the beginning of World War II. She was one of many British-born stars in the Hollywood film Forever and a Day (1943) (in whose cast Matthews was virtually unique, by virtue of not being an expat: while in New York City preparing for a Broadway role, Matthews had been recruited to film a role originally intended for Greer Garson in Hollywood over three days). She returned to the West End stage in Jerome Kern's Wild Rose, a revival of Sally, in 1942.

Matthews' popularity waned in the 1940s after several years' absence from the screen, followed by an unsatisfactory thriller, Candles at Nine (1944). She directed and featured in the short film Victory Wedding (1944), starring John Mills and Dulcie Gray.

During the war, Matthews entertained troops in Continental Europe as a member of ENSA.

=== Post-war career ===
Post-war audiences associated Matthews with a world of hectic pre-war luxury that was now seen as obsolete in austerity-era Britain. She appeared in variety tours, and returned to musical theatre in Maid to Measure, which began touring in 1947 before coming to the Cambridge Theatre in London's West End. However, it closed after only four and a half weeks. Matthews began to venture into straight theatre, and appeared in a two-week run of Terence Rattigan's Playbill at the King's Theatre in Hammersmith in 1949. This was a double bill in which she took parts in Harlequinade and The Browning Version. Matthews then starred in the revue Sauce Tartare at the Cambridge Theatre, which ran for several months and would prove to be her last West End role until 1966. In 1950, she undertook a tour of Britain playing Eliza Doolittle in Pygmalion.

Matthews toured Australia from 1952 to 1953 in Larger Than Life, a play adapted from Somerset Maugham's novel Theatre. Back in the UK, 1954 saw her touring the country in Noël Coward's Private Lives, playing the leading female role of Amanda. The following year, she was reunited with Sonnie Hale to star in a comedy, Nest of Robins, which toured British theatres. The duo also went on tour with the play in 1957, in what would be their final appearance on stage together.

Matthews was back on cinema screens when she played Tom Thumb's mother in the 1958 children's film tom thumb. Following the completion of the film, she moved to Melbourne, where she opened a drama school. She continued to work as an actress, appearing in Dinner with the Family (1959), made for Australian television. Matthews returned to live in the UK in 1960.

In the 1960s, Matthews found new fame when she took over the leading role of Mary Dale in the BBC's long-running daily radio serial The Dales, formerly known Mrs Dale's Diary. Despite a campaign by the show's fans, who included the Queen Mother, the series ended in 1969 after 21 years on air.

=== Later career ===
In January 1970, it was reported that Matthews had turned down a "substantial salary" to co-star with Hermione Gingold in Noël Coward's Fallen Angels in apartheid-era South Africa. "I cannot visit a country where human beings are not treated as such," she was quoted as saying. "I was shocked by the treatment of coloured people there." In the mid-1950s, she had clashed with her third husband over the policy.

She continued to make cabaret and occasional film and television appearances throughout the 1970s, including a one-off guest role in the BBC television drama series Angels. Her final appearance in a stage musical was playing Mrs Doasyouwouldbedoneby in The Water Babies (1973), an adaptation of the Charles Kingsley children's novel The Water-Babies, A Fairy Tale for a Land Baby.

She also played Wallis Simpson's "Aunt Bessie" Merriman in the 1978 Thames Television series Edward & Mrs. Simpson, which told the story of Edward VIII's abdication. The same year, she returned to the theatre in Lady Windermere's Fan.

She took her one-woman stage show to Los Angeles in 1979 and won the United States Drama-Logue Award for the year's best performance in concert. Matthews' last appearance was in Night of One Hundred Stars at London's Royal National Theatre, on 14 December 1980.

== Honours ==
Matthews was awarded an OBE in 1970.

== Personal life and death ==
Portrait of Jessie Matthews by Thomas Cantrell Dugdale, 1937

On 17 February 1926, aged 18, Matthews married the first of her three husbands, the 19-year-old actor Henry Lytton, Jr. at Hammersmith Register Office. He was the son of singer and actress Louie Henri and Sir Henry Lytton, the doyen of the Savoy Theatre. Matthews and Lytton Jr. lived in Warwick Close in Kensington, but the marriage did not last, and they divorced in 1930. Following this, she moved to Adelaide Road in South Hampstead.

Matthews had several romantic relationships conducted in the public eye, often causing controversy in the newspapers. The most notorious was her relationship with the married actor Sonnie Hale. A high-court judge denounced her as an "odious" individual when her love letters to Hale were used as evidence in the case of his divorce from his wife, actress/singer Evelyn 'Boo' Laye. Hale and Matthews were married on 24 January 1931 at Hampstead Register Office, and they lived in The Old House, a farmhouse in Hampton, Middlesex.

It took some time for Matthews' popularity to recover from the scandal of her affair with Hale. "If I ceased to be a star", she wrote in a piece for Picturegoer in 1934, "all that interest in my home life would evaporate, I believe. Perhaps it is the price one has to pay for being a star". During the filming of Evergreen, she suffered the first of her nervous breakdowns. On 18 December that year, she prematurely gave birth to a son, John Robert Hale Monro III, who survived for only four hours. She had another serious breakdown in 1936, and was hospitalised in New York during World War II.

In 1944, after thirteen years of marriage, Sonnie Hale and Jessie Matthews were divorced. She subsequently moved to Chelsea. On 9 August 1945, she was married for the third and last time to military officer Lt. Brian Lewis, a man thirteen years her junior. In December that year, she miscarried a child. Matthews and Lewis separated in 1956, and were subsequently divorced. However, because the divorce was in South Africa, it was not recognised in England. Consequently, the decree nisi was not granted until December 1980, over twenty years since they had last seen each other. With Hale she had one adopted daughter, Catherine Hale-Monro, who married Count Donald Grixoni on 15 November 1958; they eventually divorced, but she remained known as Catherine, Countess Grixoni.

Matthews latterly lived in Hatch End, north west London. She died of cancer, aged 74, on 19 August 1981.

== Legacy ==
A posthumous documentary on Matthews, Catch A Fallen Star, part of the BBC's 40 Minutes strand, was broadcast in 1987.

A memorial plaque above the venue for her childhood dance classes, 22 Berwick Street, Soho, was unveiled on 3 May 1995 by Andrew Lloyd Webber and stage actress Ruthie Henshall.

== Theatre credits ==
- Bluebell in Fairyland (1919)
- Dick Whittington (1920)
- Babes in the Wood (1921)
- Red Riding Hood (1922)
- Music Box Revue (1923)
- London Calling! (1923)
- Charlot's Revue of 1924 (1924)
- The Charlot Show of 1926 (1926)
- Earl Carroll's Vanities/The Charlot Show of 1927 (1927)
- One Dam Thing after Another (1927)
- Jordan (1928)
- This Year of Grace (1928)
- Wake Up and Dream (1929)
- Ever Green (1930)
- Hold My Hand (1931)
- Sally Who? (1933)
- I Can Take It (1939)
- Come Out to Play (1940)
- Aladdin (1940)
- The Lady Comes Across (1941)
- Wild Rose (1942)
- Maid to Measure (1948)
- Sweethearts and Wives (1949)
- Don't Listen Ladies (1949)
- Playbill (1949), consisting of Harlequinade and The Browning Version
- Sauce Tartare (1949)
- Pygmalion (1950)
- Castle in the Air (1950)
- Merely Players (1951)
- Larger Than Life (1952, 1955 and 1962)
- Love in Idleness (1953)
- Private Lives (1954)
- Dear Charles (1955)
- Nest of Robins (1955 and 1957)
- Janus (1956)
- Five Finger Exercise (1960)
- Dick Whittington (1960)
- The Sacred Flame (1961)
- Port in a Storm (1961)
- What a Racket! (1962)
- A Share in the Sun (1966)
- Cockles and Champagne (1969)
- Puss in Boots (1969)
- Hay Fever and Night Must Fall (1970)
- The Killing of Sister George (1971 and 1978)
- Hay Fever (1972)
- The Circle (1972)
- The Water Babies (1973)
- The Jessie Matthews Show (1976)
- Lady Windermere's Fan (1978)

Source (up to 1973):

== Filmography ==
- The Beloved Vagabond (1923) – Pan
- This England (1923) – Edward, Prince of Wales
- Straws in the Wind (1924) – The Village Maiden (uncredited)
- Out of the Blue (1931) – Tommy Tucker
- There Goes the Bride (1932) – Annette Marquand
- The Midshipmaid (1932) – Celia Newbiggin
- The Good Companions (1933) – Susie Dean
- Friday the Thirteenth (1933) – Millie the Non-Stop Variety Girl
- The Man from Toronto (1933) – Leslie Farrar
- Waltzes from Vienna (aka Strauss's Great Waltz) (1934) – Resi Ebezeder
- Evergreen (1934) – Harriet Green
- First a Girl (1935) – Elizabeth
- It's Love Again (1936) – Elaine Bradford aka Mrs. Smythe-Smythe
- Head Over Heels (aka Head Over Heels in Love) (1937) – Jeanne Colbert
- Gangway (1937) – Pat Wayne
- Sailing Along (1938) – Kay Martin
- Climbing High (1938) – Diana
- Forever and a Day (1943) – Mildred Trimble
- Candles at Nine (1944) – Dorothea Capper – Heiress
- Victory Wedding (1944) (Director) – Narrator
- Tom Thumb (1958) – The Parent: Anne
- The Hound of the Baskervilles (1978) – Mrs. Tinsdale

== Box office ranking ==
For a number of years, British film exhibitors voted her among the top ten stars in Britain at the box office via an annual poll in the Motion Picture Herald.

- 1936 – 6th most popular star, 2nd most popular British star
- 1937 – 3rd
- 1938 – 4th

== Home video ==
Matthews' 12 starring films from There Goes the Bride to Sailing Along have been released on DVD in the UK by Network. The same films, except for Waltzes from Vienna and Evergreen, have also been released on DVD in the US by VCI Entertainment. In France, Waltzes from Vienna has been released on DVD under its local title, Le Chant du Danube by Universal, who paired it with another Hitchcock-directed film, Downhill (1927). Climbing High has also been released on French DVD by Elephant Films, as La Grande escalade.

Three of the four remaining films Matthews made after the end of her leading lady period (Forever and a Day, Tom Thumb and The Hound of the Baskervilles) have been released on DVD in various countries.

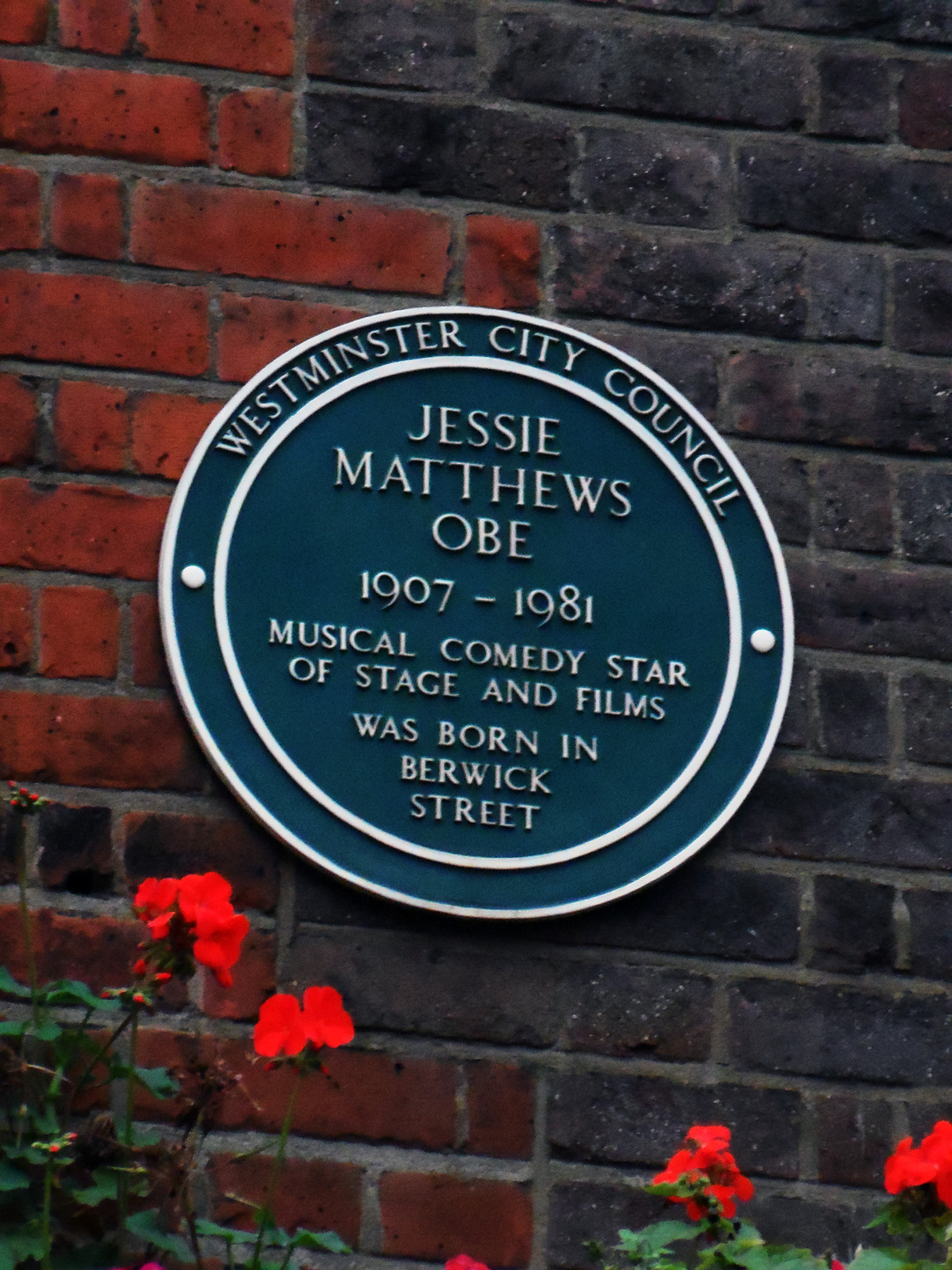
Jessie Matthews OBE 1907–1981 musical comedy star of stage and films was born in Berwick Street

== Bibliography and sources ==
- Over My Shoulder, by Jessie Matthews and Muriel Burgess, W.H. Allen Publisher, 1974 (ISBN 0-491-01572-0)
- Jessie Matthews – A Biography, by Michael Thornton, Hart-Davis Publisher, 1974 (ISBN 0-246-10801-0)
- Oxford Companion to Popular Music, Peter Grimmond, Oxford University Press, 1991 (ISBN 0-19-280004-3)
