= Lesser Samuels =

American screenwriter (1894–1980)

Lesser Samuels (26 July 1894 – 22 December 1980) enjoyed a 20-year career as a Hollywood screenwriter.

He is best known for back-to-back Oscar nominations for the racial drama No Way Out in 1950 and Billy Wilder's lacerating critique of tabloid journalism Ace in the Hole the following year.

Samuels also wrote and served as associate producer on the notorious Biblical flop The Silver Chalice - a film which its star Paul Newman deemed one of the low points of his career - in 1954.

Samuels co-authored the book for the 1960 Frank Loesser musical Greenwillow.

== Selected filmography ==
- It's Love Again (1936)
