= Evergreen (film) =

1934 British musical film

- Directed by: Victor Saville
- Written by: Marjorie Gaffney; Emlyn Williams
- Based on: Ever Green by Benn Levy
- Produced by: Michael Balcon
- Starring: Jessie Matthews; Sonnie Hale; Barry MacKay; Betty Balfour
- Cinematography: Glen MacWilliams
- Edited by: Ian Dalrymple
- Music by: Richard Rodgers; Lorenz Hart; Harry M. Woods
- Production company: Gaumont British Pictures
- Distributed by: Gaumont British Distributors
- Release date: April 1934 (United Kingdom): 31 December 1934 (USA)
- Running time: 90 minutes
- Country: United Kingdom
- Language: English

Evergreen is a 1934 British musical film directed by Victor Saville starring Jessie Matthews, Sonnie Hale and Barry MacKay. The film is based on the 1930 musical Ever Green, also starring Matthews, who plays a dual role as mother and daughter.

The film was produced at Gaumont British by Michael Balcon and shot at the Lime Grove Studios in London. The film's sets were designed by art director Alfred Junge. The music was written by Rodgers and Hart.

== Plot ==
In the Edwardian era music halls of London, popular singing star Harriet Green delights audiences with her coy rendition of "Daddy Wouldn't Buy Me a Bow Wow". Harriet, who has an illegitimate baby daughter that she keeps secret from the public, is blackmailed into leaving the stage, so she moves to South Africa to raise her daughter quietly.

Years later, her daughter, Harriet Hawkes, who strongly resembles her mother, returns to London to break into showbusiness. Handsome young publicity man Tommy Thompson convinces a theatre producer to feature Harriet Hawkes in a new revue as the "remarkably preserved" original Harriet Green. The ruse works, but when Harriet Hawkes and Tommy fall in love, the public believes that Harriet is her 50-year-old mother and that Tommy is her son.

The masquerade is revealed when the younger Harriet performs a strip-tease dance to the Harry M. Woods song "Over My Shoulder."

== Cast ==
- Jessie Matthews as Harriet Green
- Sonnie Hale as Leslie Benn
- Betty Balfour as Maudie
- Barry MacKay as Tommy Thompson
- Ivor McLaren as Marquis of Staines
- Hartley Power as Treadwell
- Patrick Ludlow as Lord Shropshire
- Betty Shale as Mrs Hawkes
- Marjorie Brooks as Marjorie Moore
- Stewart Granger as Audience Member
- Charles Mortimer as Butler
- Cyril Smith as Stage Manager

Matthews, a popular English actress, dancer and singer of the 1930s, performs a dual role as music-hall star Harriet Green and her daughter Harriet Hawkes. Hale was Matthews' real-life husband.

== Production ==
Capitalising on the success of Jessie Matthews' performance in the 1930 West End production of Rodgers and Hart's Ever Green musical, and on film with The Good Companions. producer Michael Balcon engaged her for Emlyn Williams' film adaptation of Benn W. Levy's stage play. Harry M. Woods added four songs, dropping a number of the original Rodgers and Hart numbers.

RKO, Fred Astaire's Hollywood studio, prevented Balcon from engaging Astaire, who was then appearing in The Gay Divorce at London's Palace Theatre and wanted to appear with Matthews. Contemporary reviews commented that such a partnership would be popular with critics and public.

Even though Matthews was at the peak of her popularity at the time, she was close to a mental breakdown during the making of the film. In her autobiography, Over My Shoulder, Matthews credited director Victor Saville with providing her the support that she had needed to complete the filming.

== Reception ==
When the movie premiered at the Radio City Music Hall, critic Andre Sennwald of The New York Times praised the film and Matthews' performance: "Evergreen is the most pleasurable musical comedy yet offered us by the ambitious British screen industry. Both in its suave and expert technical arrangement and in its superb Rodgers and Hart songs, this Gaumont-British screen edition of Benn W. Levy's London play is a considerable joy. In addition it is fortunate in the presence of Jessie Matthews, a nimble and winning dryad of song and dance, who deserves to be better known to American film audiences. A joyous and captivating nymph, she is the feminine counterpart of Fred Astaire. If Hollywood has the welfare of its customers at heart, it will immediately team her with Mr. Astaire in what should certainly be the perfect partnership."

Following the film's success in the U.S., MGM extended an offer of a major Hollywood role to Matthews, but Gaumont British refused to release her.
