= Beyond This Place =

Beyond This Place may refer to:

- Beyond This Place (novel), a 1950 novel by A. J. Cronin
- Beyond This Place (1959 film), a British crime mystery film based on the novel
- Beyond This Place (2010 film), a documentary film
- Beyond This Place (DuPont Show of the Month), a 1957 American television adaptation of the novel
