= En Annan =

1970 film by P. Neelakantan

- Theatrical release poster
- Directed by: Pa. Neelakandhan
- Screenplay by: Sornam
- Story by: Mullapudi Venkata Ramana
- Produced by: T. Govindarajan
- Starring: M. G. Ramachandran; Jayalalithaa
- Cinematography: V. Ramamoorthy
- Edited by: C. P. Jambulingam
- Music by: K. V. Mahadevan
- Production company: Venus Pictures
- Release date: 21 May 1970
- Running time: 170 minutes
- Country: India
- Language: Tamil

En Annan (transl. My Elder Brother), is a 1970 Indian Tamil-language crime thriller film, directed by P. Neelakantan, starring M. G. Ramachandran and Jayalalithaa. The film is a remake of the 1955 Bengali film Sabar Uparey, previously remade into Tamil as Nalla Theerpu in 1959. The film was released on 21 May 1970, and ran for 100 days in theatres.

== Plot ==
Ranga is the son of Velappan, a manager at a mill. Velappan is framed for the murder of one of the partners, Karunagaran. He is sent to jail for a crime he didn't commit. Ranga works hard to get his sister Thangam educated. She marries a doctor, Murali, who happens to be Karunagaran's son. When he finds out that she is Velappan's daughter, he leaves her. Ranga is enraged and beats his lover Valliammal's brother Nagappan, who informs Murali. Ranga is sent to jail. There he meets his father, learns about his innocence and vows to get him out. Once Ranga is released, he earns the goodwill of the other two partners, Nayagam and Dharmaraj, and finally exposes their hand in Karunagaran's murder. Velappan is released, Ranga marries his lover Valli and Murali takes Thangam back.

== Cast ==
- M. G. Ramachandran as Ranga (alias Rangan)
- R. Muthuraman as Dr. Murali
- J. Jayalalithaa as Valliammal
- M. N. Nambiar as Nayagam
- S. A. Ashokan as Dharmaraj
- Cho Ramaswamy as Poochi
- T. K. Bhagavathi as Velappan
- Thengai Srinivasan as Nagappan
- Ennatha Kannaiya as Ponnaiya
- Master Sekhar as young Ranga
- Vijaya Nirmala as Thangam, Ranga's sister
- Geethanjali as Geetha
- Sundari Bai as Baby
- S. N. Lakshmi as Murali's mother
- Shanmugasundari as Ponnaiya's wife
- Baby Sridevi as young Thangam
- S. M. Thirupadhisamy as Karunagaran

== Production ==
The film was a remake of the Telugu film, Poola Rangadu (1967), which itself was loosely based on A. J. Cronin's novel, Beyond This Place (1953). The song "Nenjam Undu Nermai Undu" was shot in different areas such as Besant Nagar, Central Station, Ripon Building, LIC Building and Anna statue.

== Soundtrack ==
The soundtrack was composed by K. V. Mahadevan.

Track listing
No.	Title	Lyrics	Singer(s)	Length
1.	"Nenjam Undu" (Solo)	Kannadasan	T. M. Soundararajan	3:27
2.	"Neela Niram"	Kannadasan	T. M. Soundararajan & S. Janaki	4:24
3.	"Kannukku Theriyada"	Vaali	P. B. Srinivas & L. R. Eswari	4:06
4.	"Kondai Oru Pakkam"	Kannadasan	T. M. Soundararajan & P. Susheela	4:09
5.	"Kadavul Yen Kallanar"	Kannadasan	T. M. Soundararajan	3:19
6.	"Aayiram Ennam Kondu"	Kannadasan	T. M. Soundararajan & P. Susheela	5:51
7.	"Aasai Iruku"	Kannadasan	T. M. Soundararajan & L. R. Eswari	3:36
8.	"Nenjam Undu"	Kannadasan	T. M. Soundararajan & P. Susheela	3:27
Total length:				32:19

== Release and reception ==
En Annan was released on 21 May 1970. The Indian Express wrote on 23 May, "There is nothing new in the story and nothing new is attempted. [..] The pace is slow but the photography makes up for it".

== Legacy ==
A film titled Nenjamundu Nermaiyundu Odu Raja was taken from one of the songs of this film as a tribute to Ramachandran. Apart from naming the title, the said song is also returned for the film.
