= The Stars Look Down (disambiguation) =

The Stars Look Down is a 1935 British novel by A. J. Cronin.

The Stars Look Down may also refer to:

- The Stars Look Down (film), a 1940 British film adaptation of the novel
- E le stelle stanno a guardare, an adaptation for Italian television in 1971
- The Stars Look Down (TV serial), a 1975 adaptation for British television
- "The Stars Look Down", a song named for the book, from the 2002 Rush album Vapor Trails
- "The Stars Look Down", the opening number of the 2005 musical Billy Elliot the Musical
