= The Stars Look Down =

1935 novel by A. J. Cronin

- First UK edition
- Author: A. J. Cronin
- Language: English
- Publisher: V. Gollancz (UK); Little, Brown (US)
- Publication date: 1935
- Publication place: United Kingdom
- Media type: Print (hardback & paperback)
- Pages: 701 p. (UK hardback edition)

The Stars Look Down is a 1935 novel by A. J. Cronin that chronicles two decades in an English coal mining community. A film version was released in 1940, and television adaptations include both Italian (1971) and British (1975) versions. The Stars Look Down is generally regarded among Cronin's best novels along with The Citadel and The Keys of the Kingdom.

The story is set in 'Sleescale', a coal mining town on the coast of Northumberland, as well as in 'Tynecastle' (Newcastle upon Tyne). While 'Sleescale' is a fictional locale, it was patterned after actual towns throughout the UK. Cronin, a Scottish physician, had served as Medical Inspector of Mines in the South Wales Valleys during the 1920s, and wrote from his observations of mine conditions and mining families.

== Plot summary ==
The novel begins in the early 20th century before World War I. The narration follows the careers and fates of multiple persons, principally, a miner's son who aspires to be a political champion for his people, a former miner who becomes a successful businessman, and a mine owner's son in conflict with his domineering father:

- David (Davey) Fenwick comes from a mining family but is drawn towards politics. He initially teaches at a school for the children of miners. He wins a series of political postings and uses his platform to argue for nationalisation of the coal industry.
- Joe Gowlan starts out as a miner, drifts for a while, and then grows prosperous as a bookie's assistant. Through unscrupulous maneuvering, he takes control of one of the region's largest factories, repurposes it as a weapons manufacturer during WWI, and accumulates enormous wealth via war-profiteering.
- Arthur Barras is the son of Richard Barras, the owner of the Neptune Colliery. Arthur is unhappy with what he regards as his father's ruthless practices and eventually runs the family business in the late 1920s after Richard suffers a debilitating stroke.

Jenny Sunley is David's indifferent wife who craves social status. Other characters, such as David's dour, strong-willed mother Martha Fenwick, have short but distinct tales of their own. Cronin exhibits a broad sympathy for the workers and a dislike of the bosses, who nevertheless are not shown as one-dimensional villains but rather more nuanced.

A key incident in the novel is a flood in the Neptune coal mine that kills over 100 men, including David's father and older brother Hughie. Arthur had witnessed his father Richard Barras being warned earlier about the potential for such a catastrophe, but choosing to not take the warning seriously. The Neptune flood proves to be a pivotal event for David and Arthur, who each in his own way devotes his life to improving mine safety.

The Great War provides narrative tension as characters must decide whether to fight, volunteer for non-military duties (David enlists as an ambulance driver in France), use trickery to evade service (like Joe Gowlan does), or defy the system by refusing call-up. The novel depicts the tribunal for Arthur, a conscientious objector. His father sits as one of the tribunal judges; they reject Arthur's moral opposition to killing as a valid exemption from service, and sentence the young man to prison.

Joe Gowlan is the triumphant figure in the end. He wins a head-to-head election contest against David, unseating the latter as MP from Sleesdale. Joe and his business partner buy out the Neptune mine from Arthur, who had become overextended and could no longer keep the family enterprise solvent.

== Publication ==
Coinciding with the book's UK publication by Victor Gollancz Ltd, The Stars Look Down was serialized in the pro-Labour Party newspaper, Daily Herald, starting in late April 1935. On 20 September 1935, the novel was published in the U.S. by Little, Brown and Co. of Boston.

== Reception ==
Although sometimes categorized as merely a competent middlebrow novelist, Cronin was praised for creating in The Stars Look Down "a classic work of 20th-century British fiction". The novel was favorably reviewed in dozens of British and American newspapers, with many calling it a major achievement after Cronin's popular first novel Hatter's Castle (1931). For instance, the Hartford Courant reviewer began:

It is hard to keep enthusiasm within bounds when writing of such a book as Dr. Cronin's The Stars Look Down. It is, of course, easy to pick flaws in its construction, and it is undoubtedly true that, after the overwhelming chapter describing the plight of the doomed men trapped in the flooded coal mine, which occurs not quite midway in the book, all that follows carries, inevitably, a sense of anti-climax. Yet granting all this, the power, the insight, the strength and sympathy of Dr. Cronin's picture of life in a great mining center comprise a book calling for superlatives, in any attempt to give an idea of the impression made upon the reader.

Other reviewers singled out Cronin's insightful portrayals of female characters as one of the novel's best qualities.

In a mixed review in The Observer, Hugh Massingham said that Cronin is most effective when he uses his eye for realistic detail to write compelling scenes that describe miners' lives, but that Cronin the "sentimental socialist" too often intrudes and "as the story continues he becomes more and more of a propagandist and less and less of a novelist."

The novel was soon translated into Russian where Cronin was criticized in Soviet literary journals for an "abstract humanism" that fell short of a rigorous revolutionary philosophy: "Cronin sees that the world of capitalism is one of social evil and injustice. Like his hero [David Fenwick], he wants justice to triumph. But he does not and will not see the real truth." Slavic scholar Samuel Hazzard Cross noted that from the Soviet point of view, "Cronin's novel shows nothing but middle-class myopia and narrowness, however accurate his portrayal of the life of the miners.... The Stars Look Down exemplifies precisely the static quality with which bourgeois realism is often reproached. The objectiveness of Dr. Cronin's description of social conditions is admitted. But his conclusions are faulty. He has omitted 'the genealogy of revolution'."

== Adaptations ==
The novel was first adapted for the screen in 1940. Co-scripted by Cronin and directed by Carol Reed, the film stars Michael Redgrave as the idealistic Davey Fenwick and Margaret Lockwood as his wife Jenny Sunley. Their troubled marriage, which is a secondary plot element in the novel, is foregrounded in the film. The American release of the film includes narration by Lionel Barrymore. It was a New York Times Critics' Pick and was subsequently listed in The New York Times Guide to the Best 1,000 Movies Ever Made.

Radiotelevisione Italiana adapted the novel as a miniseries in 1971 under the title E le stelle stanno a guardare. The dramatisation stars Orso Maria Guerrini as Davey Fenwick, Andrea Checchi as Robert Fenwick, Giancarlo Giannini as Arthur Barras and Anna Maria Guarnieri as Jenny Sunley. This version was written and directed by Anton Giulio Majano.

In 1975, Granada Television produced The Stars Look Down as a 13-episode series. It was written by Alan Plater and directed by Roland Joffé and Alan Grint.

In 2004, Tyneside playwright Alex Ferguson adapted the novel for the stage. Ferguson's version was produced several times, including a 2019 revival by the Northumberland Theatre Company that toured Northern England.

== References in other works ==
In Dorothy Sayers' Busman's Honeymoon, published two years after Cronin's book, Lord Peter Wimsey's mother starts reading The Stars Look Down, but finds it "very depressing and preachy, and not what I expected from the title."

The opening song in Billy Elliot The Musical is titled "The Stars Look Down"; an homage to Cronin's book.

The 1954 Japanese film An Inn in Osaka (大阪の宿） shows the cover of a Japanese translation of the novel.

William Trevor's story "The Children", contained in the collection Cheating at Canasta, has the child reading her dead mother's copy of The Stars Look Down while her father attempts to remarry.

Rush’s 2002 album Vapor Trails features a song called “The Stars Look Down” based on Cronin’s novel.

== See also ==
- Coal Industry Nationalisation Act 1946
