= Max Adrian =

Irish actor (1903–1973)

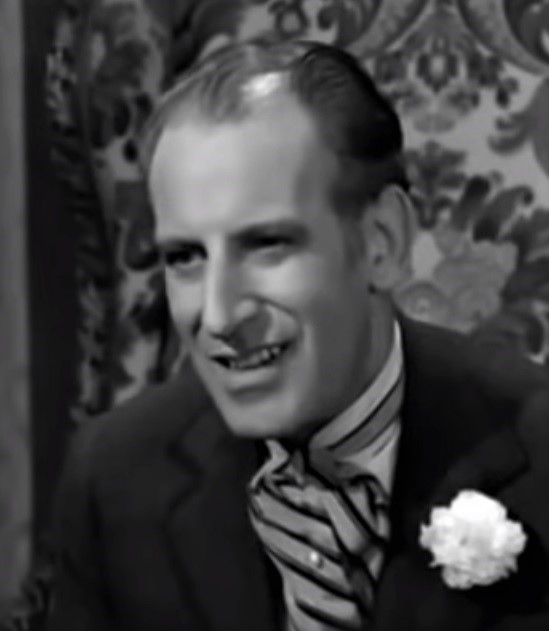
- Adrian in the TV series One Step Beyond, episode "Image of Death" (1959)
- Born: Guy Thornton Bor; 1 November 1903; Kilkenny, County Kilkenny, Ireland
- Died: 19 January 1973 (aged 69); Shamley Green, Surrey, England
- Resting place: Woking Crematorium, Woking, Surrey, England
- Occupation: Actor
- Years active: 1925–1973

Max Adrian (born Guy Thornton Bor; 1 November 1903 – 19 January 1973) was an Irish actor and singer. He was a founding member of both the Royal Shakespeare Company and the National Theatre.

In addition to his success as a character actor in classical drama, Adrian was known for his work as a singer and comic actor in revue and musicals, and in one-man shows about George Bernard Shaw and Gilbert and Sullivan, and in cinema and television films, notably Ken Russell's Song of Summer, in which he played the ailing composer Frederick Delius.

== Early years ==
Adrian was born Guy Thornton Bor in Kilkenny, County Kilkenny, Ireland, the son of Edward Norman Cavendish Bor and Mabel Lloyd Thornton. He was born in the provincial Bank of Ireland branch in Kilkenny, where his father was the bank manager, into a Church of Ireland family, the seventh of eight children. His paternal ancestry was Dutch, from settlers who arrived in Ireland with William of Orange in 1689. His elder brother was the botanist Norman Loftus Bor. Another brother, Lieutenant Thomas Humphrey Bor, RNR, was killed when his E-class submarine struck a mine in the North Sea in 1916. His younger brother, Fetherston Briscoe Bor, remained a farmer in Ireland until his death in 1965.

Adrian was educated at the Portora Royal School, Enniskillen, whose past pupils also included Oscar Wilde and Samuel Beckett.

== Career ==
=== Early work ===
Adrian began his career as a chorus boy at a silent moving-picture house, coming on as part of the chorus line while the reels were being changed. He made his stage debut in the chorus of Katja the Dancer in 1925. He then toured with Lady Be Good and The Blue Train. He made his West End debut in The Squall at the Globe Theatre in December 1927. After working with Tod Slaughter's company at Peterborough, he joined the weekly rep in Northampton, where he took some forty roles a year. He made further West End appearances in The Best of Both Worlds at the Players' Theatre in 1930, The Glass Wall at the Embassy Theatre in 1933, First Episode by Terence Rattigan and Philip Heimann at the Comedy Theatre in 1934 (later toured in the UK and then transferred to Broadway, This Desirable Residence at the Embassy in 1935, and England Expects, also at the Embassy in 1934.

=== Classical roles and revue ===
Adrian first achieved wide public notice in a nine-month season at the Westminster Theatre from September 1938, as Pandarus in a modern dress Troilus and Cressida and Sir Ralph Bloomfield Bonnington in The Doctor's Dilemma, winning enthusiastic notices from the critics: "Mr Max Adrian triumphantly turns Pandarus into a chattering and repulsive fribble of the glossily squalid night-club type"; "The egregious 'B.B.'... is a great piece of fun, and Mr. Max Adrian rightly draws him with all possible exuberance of line."

Adrian joined the Old Vic company in 1939, playing the Dauphin in Shaw's Saint Joan, "a beautifully malicious study in slyness, effeminacy, meanness, and a curious lost, inverted dignity." He continued classical work with John Gielgud's company at the Haymarket Theatre (1944–45), where he appeared as Puck in A Midsummer Night's Dream, Osric in Hamlet, and Tattle in William Congreve's Love for Love.

Away from the classics, Adrian played the Scarecrow in The Wizard of Oz at the Phoenix Theatre in 1943. In 1947, at the Lyric Theatre, Hammersmith, Adrian began performing in a series of revues (Tuppence Coloured, Oranges and Lemons, Penny Plain, Airs on a Shoestring, From Here to There, and Fresh Airs) in which he played more than 2,000 performances, and established himself, in Sheridan Morley's words, "as a superlative – if eccentric – light comedian." Fellow performers in the revues included Joyce Grenfell, Rose Hill and Elisabeth Welch. Contributors included Michael Flanders, Donald Swann and Alan Melville, and the producer was Laurier Lister, who became Adrian's lifelong partner. Adrian's musical numbers included "Prehistoric Complaint" (as a misfit caveman), "Excelsior" (as a put-upon Sherpa), "Guide to Britten" (as a manic conductor), "In the D'Oyly Cart [sic]" (as a jaded Gilbert and Sullivan performer), and "Surly Girls" (as headmistress of St. Trinian's).

When revue became less popular in the mid-1950s, Adrian went to America in 1956 to appear as Dr. Pangloss and Martin in Leonard Bernstein's operetta Candide on Broadway. The original production was a failure, but the original cast recording has rarely been out of the catalogues in the subsequent half century. He remained in the U.S., working in summer stock in roles as varied as Doolittle in Pygmalion, Jourdain in Le Bourgeois Gentilhomme, Shylock in The Merchant of Venice, and Sir Peter Teazle in The School for Scandal. He returned to London in 1959 to appear in Noël Coward's play Look After Lulu! in which he also later played on Broadway.

In 1960, Adrian joined Peter Hall's newly formed Royal Shakespeare Company (RSC) in Stratford-upon-Avon, together with such actors as Peggy Ashcroft, Peter O'Toole and Diana Rigg. He played Jaques in As You Like It, Feste in Twelfth Night, Pandarus in Troilus and Cressida, the Cardinal in John Webster's The Duchess of Malfi, and Father Barré in The Devils, as well as a range of smaller parts. He also starred with Dorothy Tutin, Richard Johnson and John Barton in The Hollow Crown, an anthology of prose and verse about the monarchs of England, devised by Barton and frequently revived in later years.

Adrian was one of the original members of Laurence Olivier's National Theatre Company at the Old Vic from 1963, and appeared as Polonius in the opening production of Hamlet, in which Peter O'Toole played the Prince. The Guardian called his performance, "sly, dry, and not quite stuffy enough, but every sally from this character was touched with a look of great complicity towards the audience which made something special of this sometimes over-charged part." He then played the Inquisitor in Saint Joan, Serebryakov in Uncle Vanya, Balance in The Recruiting Officer and Brovik in The Master Builder.

=== Solo shows and screen work ===
In the late 1960s, Adrian toured as George Bernard Shaw in the one-man show An Evening with GBS, which played in London, on Broadway, and in Asia, Africa and Australia. The Times said that the show "presented a deeply understanding portrait... impish, malicious, playful, outrageous, affectionate, angry and almost always eloquent." His later one-man show about Gilbert and Sullivan was a lesser, but real, success.

Adrian's first film was in 1934. He appeared in several British films in the 1940s, before playing the Dauphin in the Laurence Olivier production of Henry V (1944). He also appeared in Dr. Terror's House of Horrors (1965) as the vampire Dr Blake, The Deadly Affair (1966), and in several Ken Russell films: The Music Lovers (1970; as Anton Rubinstein), The Boy Friend (1971) and The Devils (1971).

Adrian was also featured in Russell's acclaimed award-winning 1968 Omnibus television film Song of Summer, as the blind and paralysed composer Frederick Delius. Adrian once said that, of all the roles he had ever played, he had never had such difficulty in ridding himself of involvement in a character as that of Delius in Song of Summer.

Also on television, Adrian appeared in a 1957 adaptation of A. J. Cronin's novel Beyond This Place, which was directed by Sidney Lumet. His other television work included the role of Senator Ludicrus Sextus in the first season of Up Pompeii! with Frankie Howerd (1969), Fagin in the 1962 dramatisation of Oliver Twist, and parts in The Baron, Adam Adamant Lives! and in 1959, in the Case of the Deadly Toy Perry Mason. He also appeared in the Doctor Who story The Myth Makers as King Priam. He played the part of the Baron de Charlus in the BBC radio plays Six Proust Reconstructions by Pamela Hansford Johnson.

Adrian's voice and acting style were distinctive. The Times referred to his "Osric-like elaborations of manner", and his voice "like no other heard on the English stage of his day, vestigially Irish and harshly attractive." The Times also described his 1934 performance in England Expects (Embassy Theatre) as "a gilded habitué of the backstairs" as outstanding.

=== Death ===
Adrian died at the age of 69, from a heart attack, at his and Lister's home after returning from the television studio where he had been taking part in a recording of Bertolt Brecht's The Caucasian Chalk Circle for the BBC. At his memorial service, at which, according to the Oxford Dictionary of National Biography, the great names of British theatre paid tribute to Max Adrian's style and professionalism, the lessons were read by Alec Guinness and Laurence Olivier, and the eulogy was given by Joyce Grenfell.

Adrian's partner Lister outlived him by 13 years, dying on 30 September 1986 at the age of 79.

== Filmography ==
Year	Title	Role	Notes
1934	The Primrose Path	Julian Leigh	
1936	A Touch of the Moon	Francis Leverton	
1936	The Cardinal	Barber	Uncredited
1936	To Catch a Thief	Salesman	
1936	The Happy Family	Noel Hutt	
1936	Nothing Like Publicity	Bob Wharncliffe	
1937	Why Pick on Me?	Jack Mills	
1937	When the Devil Was Well	David	
1938	Macushla	Kerry Muldoon	
1938	Merely Mr. Hawkins	Mr. Fletcher	
1941	Kipps	Chester Coote	
1941	Jeannie		
1941	Penn of Pennsylvania	Elton	
1942	The Young Mr. Pitt	Sheridan	
1942	Talk About Jacqueline	Lionel	
1944	Henry V	The Dauphin	
1950	Her Favourite Husband	Catoni	
1951	Pool of London	Charlie Vernon, acrobat / George	
1952	The King and the Mockingbird	The King	English version, voice
1952	The Pickwick Papers	Aide	
1959	Alfred Hitchcock Presents	Robert Stone	Season 4 Episode 29: "Banquo's Chair"
1963	Uncle Vanya	Professor Alexander Serebryakov	
1965	Dr. Terror's House of Horrors	Dr. Blake	(segment "Vampire")
1967	The Deadly Affair	Morton, Adviser	
1967	The Terrornauts	Dr. Henry Shore	
1968	Song of Summer	Frederick Delius	
1971	The Music Lovers	Nicholas Rubinstein	
1971	The Devils	Ibert	
1971	The Boy Friend	Max Mandeville aka Mr. Max / Lord Hubert Brockhurst	
