= Thing of Beauty =

Thing of Beauty may refer to:

- Thing of Beauty (album), a 1989 album by Volcano Suns
- Thing of Beauty (short story), a science fiction short story by Damon Knight
- A Thing of Beauty, a 1956 novel by author A. J. Cronin
- Things of Beauty, an album by Loituma
- A thing of beauty is a joy forever, first line of the 1818 poem Endymion by John Keats
