= Ben Stahl (artist) =

American artist and illustrator

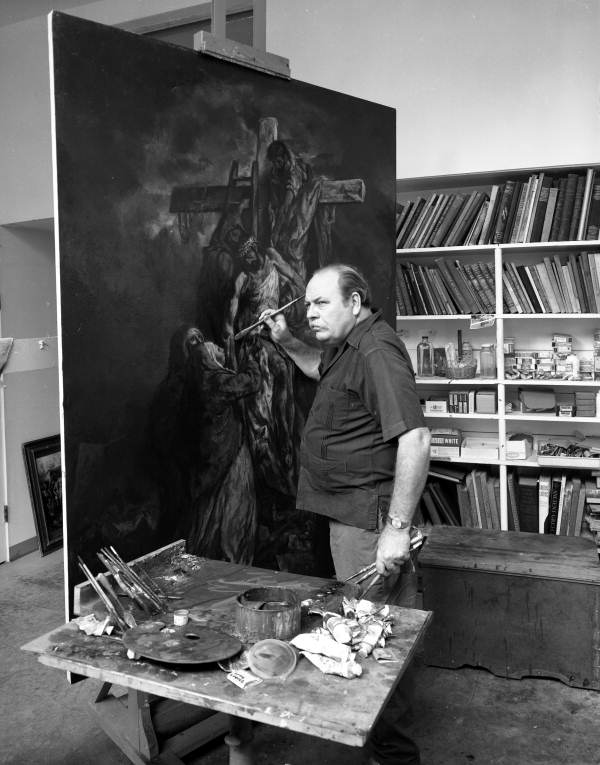
Stahl at work in Florida, 1966

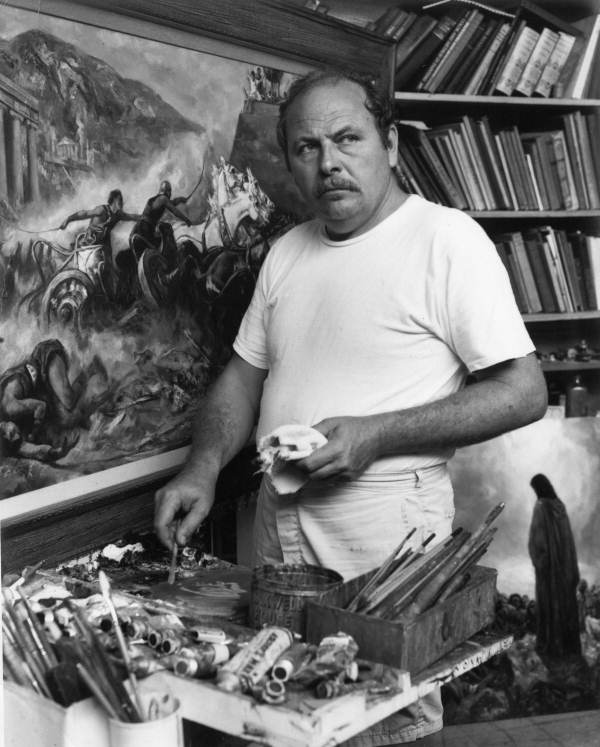
Ben Stahl painting Ben-Hur movie scenes for MGM.

Benjamin Albert Stahl (September 7, 1910 – October 19, 1987) was an American artist, illustrator and author. He showed precocious talent, winning a scholarship to the Art Institute of Chicago at age twelve. His artwork appeared in the International Watercolor Show at the Art Institute when he was sixteen. He later taught at the Art Institute, as well as at the American Academy of Art, the Art Students League of New York, Brooklyn's Pratt Institute and at various universities.

Stahl won many prizes, including the Saltus Gold Medal of the National Academy of Design. His work appeared in Women's Home Companion, Cosmopolitan, American Artist, North Light, Esquire, the Chicago Tribune Magazine, Picture Post, Southwest Art and in some 750 stories in The Saturday Evening Post. He was featured in the 1976 television series Journey into Art with Ben Stahl, 26 half-hour programs consisting of lectures and painting demonstrations by the artist. Stahl was one of the founding faculty for the Famous Artists School. In 1986, he guest-starred on Season 7 of The Joy of Painting wherein artist Bob Ross referred to him as, "a fantastic painter. He's one of the best painters in the country."

Stahl also produced advertising artwork for various companies, and posters for several movies, including Ben-Hur. He illustrated a number of books, including The Innkeeper's Wife by A.J. Cronin, a limited edition of Madame Bovary, and the 25th anniversary edition of Gone with the Wind. Stahl wrote two novels: Blackbeard's Ghost was published in 1965 by Houghton Mifflin, and made into a movie by The Walt Disney Company in 1968; The Secret of Red Skull, a sequel to Blackbeard's Ghost, was also published by Houghton Mifflin, with illustrations by Stahl's eldest son, Ben F. Stahl. His daughter Gail Stahl is also a painter.

Ben Stahl also served as an official U.S. Air Force artist and as an officer in the U.S. Air Force Reserve.

== Art theft ==
Stahl painted a series of fifteen paintings in the 1950s, commissioned by the Catholic Press. Modeled after the fourteen Stations of the Cross with a fifteenth titled Resurrection, because he wanted the series to end positively, each oil painting was six feet by nine feet (1.8 × 2.7 m).

Stahl opened The Museum of the Cross, which featured all fifteen paintings, his The Moment of Silent Prayer, and others of his work, some on loan from other museums, and gold rosaries.

Norman Rockwell sent Stahl a letter dated June 3, 1968, which read, "Those Museum of the Cross pictures are absolutely fabulous. The rest of us are just illustrators, but you are among the masters and I am filled with admiration."

Early on April 16, 1969, all the artwork from the museum, except two paintings, including The Moment of Silent Prayer, which Stahl called a "miracle picture", as it had already survived a 1967 fire that destroyed Chicago's convention center, were stolen from the museum and never recovered.

Stahl had invested most of his money into the museum.

In 1993, a television episode of Unsolved Mysteries featured the theft. The investigation into the theft was reopened in 2013 by the Sarasota County sheriff's department and Interpol Washington, but as of 2023 it had yielded no success.
