= Pocketful of Rye =

Pocketful of Rye or pocket full of rye may refer to:

- A Pocket Full of Rye, a 1953 detective novel by Agatha Christie
- "A pocket full of rye", a lyric from the nursery rhyme, "Sing a Song of Sixpence"
- A Pocketful of Rye, a 1969 novel by A. J. Cronin
