= Novi asistent =

- Based on: Dr. Finlay by A. J. Cronin
- Directed by: Mirjana Samardžić
- Starring: Dejan Dubajić; Ljiljana Jovanović; Nikola Simić; Milan Srdoč
- Country of origin: Yugoslavia
- Original language: Serbo-Croatian

Original release
- Release: 1964

Novi asistent (Serbo-Croatian Cyrillic: Нови асистент, lit. 'New Assistant') is a 1964 Yugoslavian television series based on A. J. Cronin's stories about the fictional physician Dr. Finlay. The series was directed by Mirjana Samardžić and starred Dejan Dubajić, Ljiljana Jovanović, Nikola Simić, and Milan Srdoč.
