= Poola Rangadu (1967 film) =

- Theatrical release poster
- Directed by: Adurthi Subba Rao
- Written by: Ranganayakamma (dialogues)
- Screenplay by: Adurthi Subba Rao
- Story by: Mullapudi Venkata Ramana
- Based on: Beyond This Place by A. J. Cronin
- Produced by: D. Madhusudhana Rao
- Starring: Akkineni Nageswara Rao; Jamuna; Sobhan Babu; Vijaya Nirmala
- Cinematography: P. S. Selvaraj
- Edited by: T. Krishna
- Music by: S. Rajeswara Rao
- Production company: Annapurna Pictures
- Release date: 24 November 1967
- Running time: 165 minutes
- Country: India
- Language: Telugu

Poola Rangadu is a 1967 Indian Telugu-language crime drama film, produced by D. Madhusudhana Rao under Annapurna Pictures and directed by Adurthi Subba Rao. It stars Akkineni Nageswara Rao, Jamuna, Sobhan Babu, Vijaya Nirmala, with music composed by S. Rajeswara Rao. The film is a remake of the 1955 Bengali film Sabar Uparey, which itself is based on A. J. Cronin's 1950 novel Beyond This Place. It was released on 24 November and became a box office success.

== Plot ==
Ranga Rao is a carefree jovial person and is better known as Poola Rangadu. He makes a living pulling horse carts and is in love with Venkatalakshmi. When both he and his sister were children, their father Veerayya used to work as a manager at a mill, owned by Purushotham. Purushotham was murdered by his business partners Dharma Rao and Chalapathi. Veerayya is framed by them and is sentenced to life imprisonment leaving his children completely helpless. Despite hardships, Ranga has managed to raise his sister Padma with great care and loves her very much. Venkatalakshmi's no-good brother, Narasimhulu, has an eye for Padma, but she falls in love with Dr. Prasad. Ranga gets her married to the doctor. However, he happens to be the son of Purushotham. A vengeful Narasimhulu uses the fact that Padma is Purushotham's alleged murderer Veerayya's daughter to poison her mother-in-law against her who promptly throws the now pregnant Padma out of the house. Ranga becomes furious at this and beats up Narasimhulu. This ends up getting Ranga arrested and he is sent to prison for a year. In jail, Ranga bumps into his father who tells him about how he was framed. Once his one-year sentence is up, Ranga decides to prove his father's innocence at all cost. With this intention, he makes his way into Dharma Rao's house where he cleverly stirs up trouble between Dharma Rao and Chalapathi. Through various schemes, Ranga finally manages to prove his father's innocence. Padma is reunited with her husband and Ranga marries Venkatalakshmi.

== Cast ==
- Akkineni Nageswara Rao as Ranga Rao
- Jamuna as Venkata Lakshmi
- Sobhan Babu as Dr. Prasad
- Vijaya Nirmala as Padma
- V. Nagayya as Veeraiah
- Gummadi as Dharma Rao
- Allu Ramalingaiah as Police Punaiah
- Padmanabham as Bujji
- Chalam as Narasimhulu
- Bhanu Prakash as Chalapathi
- Suryakantham as Baby
- Malathi as Prasad's mother
- Geetanjali as Lilly
- Radha Kumari as Punaiah's wife

== Production ==
Producer D. Madhusudhana Rao sought to work on the adaptation of the A. J. Cronin novel Beyond This Place, on the suggestion of Gollapudi Maruti Rao. He hired Mullapudi Venkata Ramana to write the story taking a basic plot point from the novel while Ranganayakamma provided the dialogues. Prisons scenes were shot at real locations at Chanchalguda and Musheerabad Central Prisons in Hyderabad with the permission of the state government. Though the film was predominantly shot in black-and-white, the "Nee Jilugu Paita" song sequence alone was in colour.

== Soundtrack ==
The music was composed by S. Rajeswara Rao.

Song title	Lyrics	Singers	length
"Neetiki Nilabadi Nijayiteega"	Kosaraju	Ghantasala	4:13
"Neevu Raavu Nidura Raadu"	Dasaradhi	P. Susheela	3:49
"Nee Nadumupaina Cheyi Vesi"	C. Narayana Reddy	Ghantasala, P. Susheela	3:50
"Chigurulu Vesina Kalalannee"	C. Narayana Reddy	P. Susheela, Mohan Raju	4:11
"Chillara Rallaku Mokkutu"	Kosaraju	Ghantasala, V. Nagayya	3:24
"Misamisalade Chinadana"	C. Narayana Reddy	Ghantasala, P. Susheela	3:59
"Siggenduke Pilla"	C. Narayana Reddy	Madhavapeddi Satyam, Vasantha	3:18
"Eyra Sinnodeyra"	C. Narayana Reddy	P. Susheela	3:49
"Burrakatha"	C. Narayana Reddy	Ghantasala, P. Susheela	6:08

== Release and reception ==
Griddaluru Gopalrao of Zamin Ryot, in his review dated 1 December 1967, criticised the film for its poor direction and performances. The film ran for more than 100 days in 11 centres in Andhra Pradesh.

== Awards ==
Mullapudi Venkata Ramana won the Nandi Award for Second Best Story Writer (1967).
