= Emlyn Williams =

Welsh writer, dramatist and actor (1905–1987)

Emlyn Williams CBE
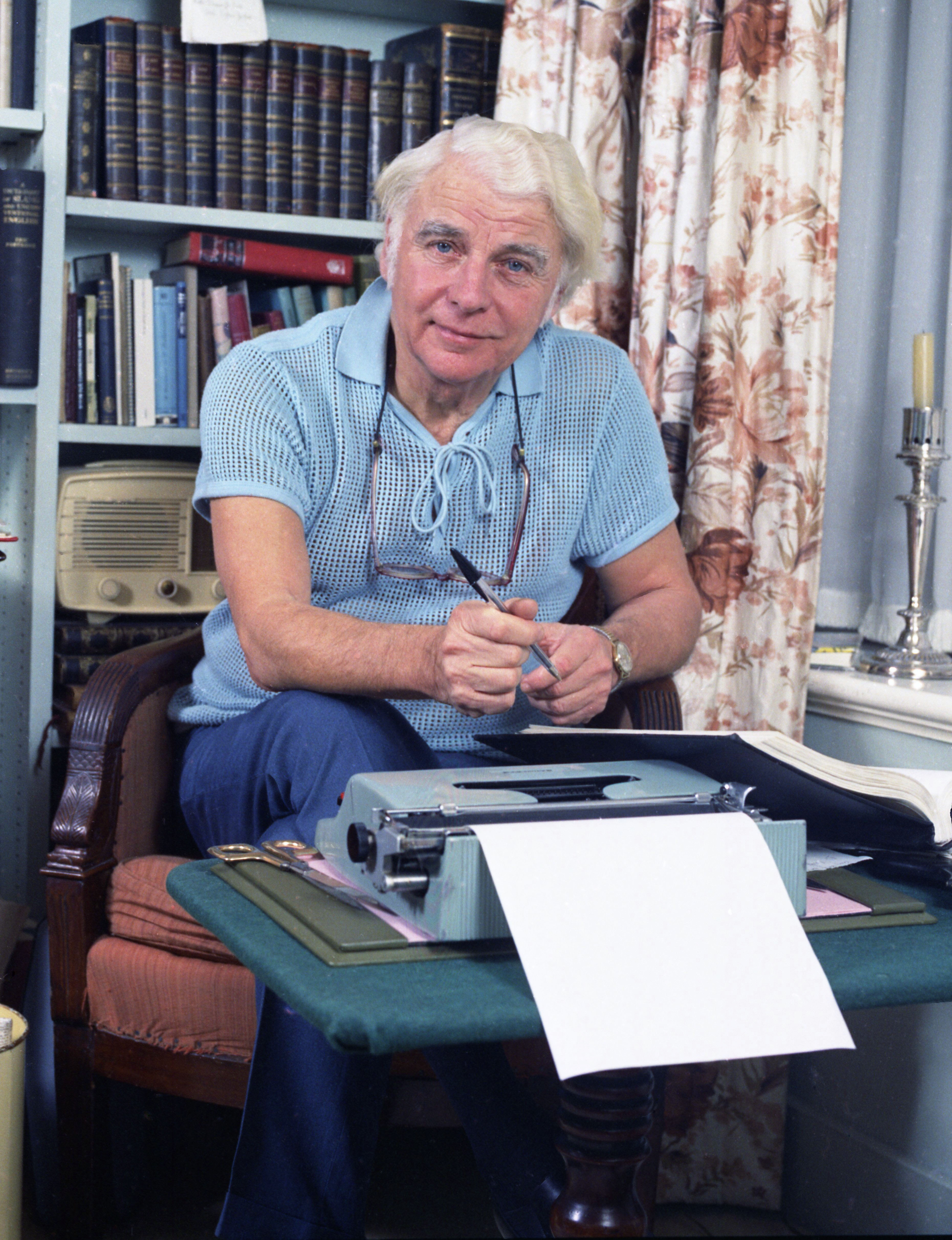
- Williams in 1974, portrait by Allan Warren
- Born: George Emlyn Williams; 26 November 1905; Mostyn, Flintshire, Wales
- Died: 25 September 1987 (aged 81); Chelsea, London, England
- Occupations: Writer, dramatist, actor
- Years active: 1927–1985
- Spouse: Mary Shann (m. 1935; died 1970)

George Emlyn Williams (26 November 1905 – 25 September 1987) was a Welsh writer, dramatist and actor.

== Early life ==
Williams was born into a Welsh-speaking working class family at 1 Jones Terrace, Pen-y-ffordd, Ffynnongroyw, Flintshire. He was the eldest of the three surviving sons of Mary (née Williams), a former maidservant, and Richard Williams, a greengrocer. He spoke only Welsh until the age of eight. Later, he said he would probably have begun working in the mines at the age of 12 if he had not caught the attention of Sarah Grace Cooke, the model for Miss Moffat in The Corn Is Green. She was a teacher of French at the grammar school in Holywell, Flintshire, where Williams had gone on a scholarship. Over the course of seven years from 1915 onwards she encouraged him in his studies, and she also helped to pay for him to stay with a French friend of hers in Haute-Savoie in France, where he spent three months perfecting his French. When he was 17 she helped him to win a scholarship to Christ Church, Oxford, where he studied French and Italian.

In 1926, during his studies at university, Williams had a nervous breakdown, which was blamed largely on a failed friendship with another undergraduate. As a means of recovery Miss Cooke encouraged him to write. However, Williams intended to enter the theatrical world too and joined the Oxford University Dramatic Society (OUDS).

== Professional career ==
Aged 22, Williams performed with OUDS in his first full-length play, Full Moon, at the original Oxford Playhouse in 1927. Later that year he joined a London-based repertory company and began his stage career. By age 25 (1930), he had expanded his writing with works such as A Murder Has Been Arranged and The Late Christopher Bean. The same year he appeared in Edgar Wallace's hit thriller On the Spot in the West End.

Over the next few years Williams took on roles on stage and in films, including the first film version of Edgar Wallace's mystery, The Frightened Lady. At the age of 30 he became an overnight star with his thriller Night Must Fall (1935), in which he also played the lead role of a psychopathic murderer. The play was noted for its exploration of the killer's complex psychological state, a step forward for its genre.

His other highly successful play was very different: The Corn Is Green, written in 1938 when he was 33), was partly based on his own childhood in Wales. He starred as a Welsh schoolboy in the play's London premiere. The play came to Broadway in 1940 with Ethel Barrymore as the schoolteacher Miss Moffat. A 1950 Broadway revival starred Eva La Gallienne. The play was turned into a very successful film starring Bette Davis, and again into a made-for-television film starring Katharine Hepburn, under the direction of Williams's close friend George Cukor. An attempt to turn the play into a musical in the 1970s, with Davis again in the role of the schoolteacher with lyrics by Williams, failed. So did a Broadway revival in 1983 starring Cicely Tyson and Peter Gallagher. But a 1985 London revival at the Old Vic with Deborah Kerr was successful, as was a 2007 production at the Williamstown Theatre Festival in Massachusetts. That production starred Kate Burton. Williams was a close friend of Kate's parents, Richard Burton and Burton's first wife, Sybil. In the Williamstown production, the schoolboy – the role created by and modelled on Williams himself – was played by Kate Burton's son, Morgan Ritchie. The Corn is Green was revived at the National Theatre in London in 2022 with Nicola Walker playing Miss Moffat. Emlyn Williams included this story in his early autobiography George covering the years 1905-1927 and published in 1961. A sequel, Emlyn, covering the years 1927–1935, was published in 1973.

Emlyn Williams's autobiographical light comedy, The Druid's Rest, was first performed at the St Martin's Theatre, London, in 1944. It saw the stage debut of Richard Burton, whom Williams had spotted at an audition in Cardiff. The play has been revived at Clwyd Theatr Cymru in both 1976 and 2005, and received its first London revival in sixty years at the Finborough Theatre in London in 2009.

In addition to stage plays, Emlyn Williams wrote a number of film screenplays, working with Alfred Hitchcock (on The Man Who Knew Too Much), Carol Reed and other directors. He acted in and contributed dialogue to various films based on the novels of A. J. Cronin, including The Citadel (1938), The Stars Look Down (1939), Hatter's Castle (1942) and Web of Evidence (1959). He played the mad Roman emperor Caligula in the uncompleted 1937 film version of Robert Graves's novel I, Claudius (with Charles Laughton); a kindly veterinarian who accidentally causes the death of a murderess (played by Bette Davis) in the 1952 suspense drama Another Man's Poison; and the fool Wamba in the 1952 Ivanhoe (with Robert Taylor and Elizabeth Taylor).

Other screen credits include Hitchcock's adaptation of Daphne du Maurier's Jamaica Inn (with Charles Laughton), Gabriel Pascal's film version of Bernard Shaw's Major Barbara (with Wendy Hiller and Rex Harrison), José Ferrer's I Accuse! (playing Émile Zola), The Wreck of the Mary Deare (with Gary Cooper), The L-Shaped Room (with Leslie Caron), and a made-for-TV adaptation of Charles Dickens's David Copperfield (with an all-star cast including Laurence Olivier, Michael Redgrave, Ralph Richardson and Edith Evans). In 1941 Williams starred in the film You Will Remember, directed by Jack Raymond and written by Sewell Stokes and Lydia Hayward. The film is based on the life of the popular late Victorian songwriter Leslie Stuart, played here by Robert Morley, with Williams as Stuart's best friend. Also in 1941, he had a principal supporting part (as Snobby Price) in Pascal's filming of Major Barbara.

Williams's only film as a director, The Last Days of Dolwyn (1949), which he also wrote and starred in, marked the screen debut of Richard Burton. Williams often appeared in his own plays, and was famous for his one-man shows, with which he toured the world, playing Charles Dickens in an evening of excerpts from Dickens's novels. This "one man show" was the start of a whole new theatrical genre. He followed up his Dickens performance with one man shows based on the works of Dylan Thomas, Dylan Thomas Growing Up, and Saki. His post-war acting credits included The Winslow Boy by Terence Rattigan and The Deputy aka The Representative by Rolf Hochhuth on Broadway. He also was the "voice" of Lloyd George in the seminal BBC documentary The Great War (1964).

Among Williams's other books was the bestseller Beyond Belief: A Chronicle of Murder and its Detection (1968), a semi-fictionalised account of the Moors murderers, Ian Brady and Myra Hindley. His 1980 novel Headlong, a story of the unexpected death of the entire British royal family in a freak accident in 1930, and the ascent of a most unlikely heir to the British throne as a result, was the loose basis of the 1991 motion picture King Ralph.

On Monday 17 February 1975, Williams was Roy Plomley's guest on Desert Island Discs on BBC Radio 4. The author's book choice was a dictionary with a typewriter, pen and paper combined as his luxury.

== Personal life ==
Williams was married in 1935 to actress Mary Margery Carus-Wilson (née Shann), who died in 1970. They had two sons, Alan, a writer, and Brook, an actor. Brook became a close friend of Richard Burton, working as his personal assistant and appearing in many of his films. Williams was godfather to Kate Burton.

Both during his marriage and following his wife's death, Williams was bisexual throughout his adult life. He maintained a relationship from 1981 to 1986 with American theatre journalist Albert N. Williams, whom he met while he was appearing at the Northlight Theatre in the Chicago area with his one-man Charles Dickens show. Albert Williams served as Emlyn Williams's personal assistant during a 1982 tour of England, Wales and Ireland with the Charles Dickens and Dylan Thomas solo shows.

== Death ==
Emlyn Williams died on 25 September 1987 at his flat in Dovehouse Street, Chelsea, London, from complications from bowel cancer. He was 81 years old. He was cremated at Golders Green Crematorium, London.

== Honours ==
- Emlyn Williams was awarded an honorary degree by the University of Wales in 1949.
- Emlyn Williams was appointed a Commander of the Order of the British Empire (CBE) in 1962.

== Bibliography ==
=== Plays ===
- Full Moon
- A Murder Has Been Arranged
- Spring 1600
- Night Must Fall
- He was Born Gay (1937) a play about the Dauphin son of Louis XVI
- The Corn Is Green
- The Light of Heart
- The Morning Star
- A Month in the Country (Adapted from the play by Turgenev)
- The Druid's Rest
- The Wind of Heaven
- Trespass
- Accolade
- Someone Waiting
- Beth, later revised under the title Cuckoo

=== Filmography ===
- Night Must Fall, directed by Richard Thorpe (1937, based on the play Night Must Fall)
- Life Begins at Eight-Thirty, directed by Irving Pichel (1942, based on the play The Light of Heart)
- The Corn Is Green, directed by Irving Rapper (1945, based on the play The Corn Is Green)
- Time Without Pity, directed by Joseph Losey (UK, 1957, based on the play Someone Waiting)
- Life Begins at Eight, directed by Michael Kehlmann (West Germany, 1962, based on the play The Light of Heart)
- Night Must Fall, directed by Karel Reisz (UK, 1964, based on the play Night Must Fall)
- The Corn Is Green, directed by George Cukor (TV film, 1979, based on the play The Corn Is Green)
- King Ralph, directed by David S. Ward (1991, based on the novel Headlong)

=== Actor ===
- The Frightened Lady (1932) as Lord Lebanon (film debut)
- Men of Tomorrow (1932) as Horners
- Sally Bishop (1932) as Arthur Montague
- Friday the Thirteenth (1933) as William Blake
- My Song for You (1934) as Theodore Bruckner
- Evensong (1934) as George Leary
- Road House (1934) as Chester
- The Iron Duke (1934) as Bates
- The Dictator (1935) as King Christian VII
- City of Beautiful Nonsense (1935) as Jack Grey
- Broken Blossoms (1936) as Chen
- I, Claudius (1937) as Caligula (the film was never completed, but footage is preserved)
- Dead Men Tell No Tales (1938) as Dr. Headlam
- Night Alone (1938) as Charles Seaton
- The Citadel (1938) as Owen
- They Drive by Night (1938) as Shorty Matthews
- Jamaica Inn (1939) as Harry the Peddler - Sir Humphrey's Gang
- The Stars Look Down (1940) as Joe Gowlan
- The Girl in the News (1940) as Tracy
- You Will Remember (1941) as Bob Slater
- Major Barbara (1941) as Snobby Price
- This England (1941) as Appleyard
- Hatter's Castle (1942) as Dennis
- The Last Days of Dolwyn (1949) as Rob
- Three Husbands (1951) as Maxwell Bard
- The Scarf (1951) as Dr. David Dunbar
- Another Man's Poison (1951) as Dr. Henderson
- The Magic Box (1951) as Bank Manager
- Ivanhoe (1952) as Wamba/Narrator
- The Deep Blue Sea (1955) as Sir William Collyer
- I Accuse! (1958) as Émile Zola
- Beyond This Place (1959) as Enoch Oswald
- The Wreck of the Mary Deare (1959) as Sir Wilfred Falcett
- The L-Shaped Room (1962) as Dr. Weaver
- The Epic That Never Was (1965, TV) as Himself
- Eye of the Devil (1966) as Alain de Montfaucon
- David Copperfield (1969, TV Movie) as Mr. Dick
- The Walking Stick (1970) as Jack Foil
- The Deadly Game (1982, TV Movie) as Bernard Laroque
- Past Caring (1985, TV Movie) as Edward (final film)

=== Screenwriter ===
- Friday the Thirteenth (1933)
- Evergreen (1934)
- The Divine Spark (1935)
- Broken Blossoms (1936)
- The Last Days of Dolwyn (1949)

=== Director ===
- The Last Days of Dolwyn (1949)

=== Novels ===
- George (1961)
- Beyond Belief: A Chronicle of Murder and its Detection (1968)
- Emlyn (1973)
- Headlong (1980)
