= Adventures in Two Worlds =

1951 book by Archibald Joseph Cronin

- First UK edition
- Author: A. J. Cronin
- Language: English
- Genre: Autobiography
- Publisher: Gollancz (UK); Little, Brown (US)
- Publication date: 1952
- Publication place: United Kingdom
- Media type: Print (Hardback & Paperback)
- Pages: 288 pp (UK hardback edition)
- ISBN: 0-450-03195-0 (UK hardback edition)

Adventures in Two Worlds is the 1952 autobiography of Dr. A. J. Cronin, in which he relates, with much humour, the exciting events of his dual career as a medical doctor and a novelist.
