= The Minstrel Boy (novel) =

1975 novel by A. J. Cronin

- First UK edition
- Author: A. J. Cronin
- Language: English
- Publisher: Gollancz (UK); Little, Brown (US)
- Publication date: 1975
- Publication place: United Kingdom
- Media type: Print (Hardback & Paperback)
- Pages: 285 pp. (UK hardback edition)
- ISBN: 0-575-01972-7

The Minstrel Boy (also published under the title Desmonde) is a 1975 novel by A. J. Cronin.

== Plot ==
The story concerns the life of a young priest called Desmonde Fitzgerald. In his seminary he is noted for his magnificent singing voice, his practical jokes and his good looks which make him inordinately attractive to women. In his first clerical posting in Ireland, the lady of the manor falls in love with him, but he is seduced by her niece, whom he later marries. He becomes a musician and lives in poverty in Dublin, where his wife deserts him and later dies in Switzerland. After a period in Spain he is given a second chance and becomes a missionary to India, where he again risks becoming involved with a rich local woman but this time escapes. The book contains the classic Cronin features of human weakness and failure with ultimate redemption.

== Autobiographical references ==
The story's narration is by a character "Alec Shannon" who bears a close resemblance to Cronin himself. In the novel, reference is clearly made to his own alma mater, St Aloysius' College, as the description of the fictional school, St Ignatius', is clearly a description of the buildings and environs of the school Cronin attended. Reference is also made to his footballing exploits as Cronin was reputedly an excellent footballer and played in the College First XI . Cronin never specifically mentioned his own school in his books but does refer to another Jesuit school, Stonyhurst and a combination of Stonyhurst and Ampleforth called "Amplehurst". He also never refers directly to Glasgow, but to the fictional locale of "Winton", which often stands in for Glasgow in Cronin's novels.
