= The Valorous Years =

2010 novella by A. J. Cronin

- Author: A. J. Cronin
- Language: English
- Genre: Novella
- Published: February 2010 A. J. Cornell Publications (US)
- Publication place: United States
- Media type: Print (Paperback)
- Pages: 168 pp.
- ISBN: 0-9727439-7-9

The Valorous Years is a serial novella by A. J. Cronin, initially published in 1940 in Good Housekeeping magazine. It is the moving story of a young man, Duncan Stirling, who, though his left arm is crippled by polio, is determined to become a physician. Woven into Stirling’s life are three women — Margaret, whose charm and beauty cast a spell over him; Anna, a brilliant surgeon who wants to heal his useless limb; and Jean, the compassionate daughter of a kindly country doctor, whom he later successes. The story was also printed in book form by various international publishers. The novella was adapted in 1977 for French television as a miniseries in 6 episodes entitled Les Années d'Illusion and starring Josephine Chaplin.
