= Balipeetam =

1975 film

- Theatrical release poster
- Directed by: Dasari Narayana Rao
- Based on: Balipeetam by Ranganayakamma
- Produced by: Y. Sunil Chowdary
- Starring: Sobhan Babu; Sarada; Murali Mohan
- Music by: K. Chakravarthy
- Production company: Ravi Shankar Art Pictures
- Release date: 1975
- Country: India
- Language: Telugu

Balipeetam is a 1975 Indian Telugu-language drama film directed by Dasari Narayana Rao. The film stars Sobhan Babu and Sarada in the lead roles. It is produced by Y. Sunil Chowdary. It is based on the popular socialist novel Balipeetam written by Ranganayakamma.

== Plot ==
Bhaskar (Sobhan Babu) is a Dalit Social worker. Aruna (Sarada) is a Brahmin child-widow with consumption on her deathbed. Fulfilling her last wish to die a "Sumangali" (as someone's wife) Bhaskar marries her after telling her that he is a Dalit, which she gratefully accepts. Aruna recovers after operation and the couple lives a happy married life and they have a daughter. Bhaskar's sister (Nirmalamma) and nephew come to live them. Aruna finds it unable to accustom in Bhaskar's household. She finds them very much unlike Bhaskar. Their dialect, dressing sense and practices makes her feel the cultural distance. One of the major themes of Dalit Literature, Intercaste marriage is the leitmotif in this movie. Aruna insults Bhaskar on the basis of his lower caste and goes back to her aunt (Hemalatha) and uncle (Allu Ramalingaiah). There she sees that her relatives are more interested in her money than her and her children's well-being. Surprisingly, her cousin Kamala (Roja Ramani) marries a man (Raja Babu) of different religion. She takes care of her family becoming a housewife. She becomes an instrument in Aruna's comprehension of human nature. In the end when Aruna is ill again due to consumption, she finds that she and her children need a safer abode than her own home. She goes to Bhaskar's family, and she sees that outward appearances do not account for inner purity. The Dalit In-law family takes care of Aruna and her two children. Bhaskar comes to her and Aruna dies in his arms apologizing for sacrificing so many lives with her decisions and thus the title, Balipeetam: The pedestal of sacrifice. The core issues of inter-caste marriages and interpersonal relations are woven into the movie.

== Cast ==
- Sobhan Babu
- Sarada
- Nirmalamma
- Roja Ramani
- Raja Babu
- Hemalatha
- Allu Ramalingaiah
- Murali Mohan
- Sri Vidya
- Baby Rani

== Soundtrack ==
- "Chandamama Rave Jabilli Rave" (Lyrics: Dasarathi; Singers: V. Ramakrishna and P. Susheela; Cast: Shobhan Babu and Sharada)
- "Kusalama Neeku Kusalamena" (Lyrics: Devulapalli Krishnasastri; Singers: S. P. Balasubrahmanyam and P. Susheela; Cast: Shobhan Babu and Sharada)
- "Maarali Maarali Manushula Nadavadi Maarali" (Lyrics: C. Narayana Reddy; Singers: S. P. Balasubrahmanyam and P. Susheela)
- "Kalasi Padudam" (Lyrics: Srirangam Srinivasa Rao; Singers: S. P. Balasubrahmanyam and P. Susheela)
- "Takku Tikku Takkuladi Bandira" (Lyrics: Kosaraju Raghavaiah; Singers: S. P. Balasubrahmanyam and S. Janaki)
- "Yesukundam Buddoda" (Lyrics: Kosaraju Raghavaiah; Singers: Pithapuram Nageswara Rao and Madhavapeddi Satyam)

== Box office ==
- The film ran for more than 100 days in two centers: Vijayawada and Guntur.
