= Grand Canary (film) =

1934 film by Irving Cummings

- Directed by: Irving Cummings
- Written by: Ernest Pascal
- Based on: Grand Canary by A. J. Cronin
- Produced by: Jesse L. Lasky
- Starring: Warner Baxter; Madge Evans; Marjorie Rambeau; Zita Johann; H.B. Warner
- Cinematography: Bert Glennon
- Edited by: Jack Murray
- Music by: Louis De Francesco; Hugo Friedhofer; Arthur Lange; Cyril J. Mockridge
- Production company: Fox Film Corporation
- Distributed by: Fox Film Corporation
- Release date: July 20, 1934
- Running time: 78 minutes
- Country: United States
- Language: English

Grand Canary is a 1934 American drama film directed by Irving Cummings and starring Warner Baxter, Madge Evans and Marjorie Rambeau. It is an adaptation of A. J. Cronin's 1933 novel of the same title. It was produced and distributed by the Fox Film Corporation.

== Plot ==
A British doctor is forced to leave England after three of his patients die during experimental treatment. He boards a freighter from Liverpool and lands in the Canary Islands. He encounters Lady Mary Fielding, the wife of one of the wealthiest landowners in the area, and explains to her that the patients died before he could administer his new serum to them, and he has been falsely scapegoated by the medical profession. When a yellow fever outbreak threatens the health of many on the island, including Lady Fielding, he takes a key role in quelling the disease. In this time he bonds with Suzan Tranter, running a medical mission, whom he has known for some years. Lady Fielding returns to her husband and the doctor finds happiness with Susan.

== Cast ==
- Warner Baxter as Dr. Harvey Leith
- Madge Evans as Lady Mary Fielding
- Marjorie Rambeau as Daisy Hemingway
- Zita Johann as Suzan Tranter
- Roger Imhof as Jimmy Corcoran
- H.B. Warner as Dr. Ismay
- Barry Norton as Robert Tranter
- Juliette Compton as Elissa Baynham
- Gilbert Emery as Captain Renton
- John Rogers as Trout
- Carrie Daumery as the Marquesa
- Desmond Roberts as Purser
- Keith Hitchcock as Michael Fielding
- George Regas as El Dazo
- Sam Appel as Miguel
- Rosa Rey as Manuella
- Harrington Reynolds as Quartermaster
- Rodolfo Hoyos as Singer

== Bibliography ==
- Goble, Alan. The Complete Index to Literary Sources in Film. Walter de Gruyter, 1999. ISBN 978-3-11-095194-3.
- Solomon, Aubrey. The Fox Film Corporation, 1915-1935: A History and Filmography. McFarland, 2011. ISBN 978-0-7864-6286-5.
