= A Murder Has Been Arranged =

1930 play written by Emlyn Williams

- Original language: English
- Written by: Emlyn Williams
- Genre: Thriller

Premiere
- Date: 26 November 1930
- Place: St James's Theatre, London

A Murder Has Been Arranged is a 1930 thriller play by the British writer Emlyn Williams.

It ran for 77 performances at the St James's Theatre in London's West End between 26 November 1930 and 31 January 1931. The cast included Henry Kendall, Margaretta Scott and Amy Veness. It then went on an extended national tour with Donald Wolfit in the cast. In 1932 it was staged on Broadway and at the Pasadena Playhouse. The Broadway production featured Joseph Cotten in one of his earliest roles.

== Sources ==
- Kabatchnik, Amnon. Blood on the Stage, 1925-1950: Milestone Plays of Crime, Mystery, and Detection : an Annotated Repertoire. Scarecrow Press, 2010.
- Wearing, J.P. The London Stage 1930-1939: A Calendar of Productions, Performers, and Personnel. Rowman & Littlefield, 2014.
