= Kaleidoscope in "K" =

1939 novella by A. J. Cronin

- 1939 German book cover
- Author: A. J. Cronin
- Language: English
- Genre: Novella
- Publisher: Zsolnay Germany
- Publication date: 1939
- Publication place: United Kingdom
- Media type: Print (Hardback & Paperback)

"Kaleidoscope in "K"" is a novella by author A. J. Cronin, initially published in 1933 in Cosmopolitan magazine. All of the action unfolds within twelve hours in a London hospital, and the story centres around the conflict between a young surgeon, Dr. Barclay, and the hospital chief, Dr. Selby. A subplot is the rivalry between Barclay and a playboy physician, Dr. Preston, as they vie for the attentions of Miss Fanshawe, an attractive nurse. The story comes to a tense climax as Barclay prepares for a delicate brain operation, a revolutionary procedure to which Selby is opposed. The story was also printed in book form by various publishers, and it was also adapted into a 1934 film, Once to Every Woman.
