= Once to Every Woman (1934 film) =

1934 film by Lambert Hillyer

- Lobby card
- Directed by: Lambert Hillyer
- Written by: Jo Swerling
- Based on: "Kaleidoscope in 'K'" by A. J. Cronin
- Produced by: Robert North
- Starring: Ralph Bellamy; Fay Wray; Walter Connolly; Mary Carlisle
- Cinematography: John Stumar
- Edited by: Richard Cahoon
- Music by: David Klatzkin
- Distributed by: Columbia Pictures
- Release date: March 24, 1934
- Running time: 70 minutes
- Country: United States
- Language: English

Once to Every Woman is a 1934 American pre-Code film adaptation of A. J. Cronin's 1933 short story Kaleidoscope in "K". The film was made by Columbia Pictures and stars Ralph Bellamy and Fay Wray.

== Plot ==
Mary Fanshawe is a dedicated, professional supervising nurse in an urban hospital. She is very friendly with one resident, Dr. Preston, although it is clear that she is not his sole object of attention. Fanshawe reprimands one young nurse, Doris Andros for her careless attitude, but she is unaware that Andros and Preston are seeing one another in secret. Fanshawe is far less friendly with young Dr. Jim Barclay despite his attentions toward her. Barclay, though, is also distracted by tensions with his superior, Dr. Walter Selby, who rejects the younger man's suggestions of trying more modern medical and surgical techniques.

During a crucial operation that Selby had insisted on performing himself, he finds himself unable to continue and hands the procedure to Barclay, who succeeds with a radically new technique, calmly observed by Fanshawe, who is acting as head nurse. Selby is forced to concede that his own time as a lead surgeon and hospital head has passed. Later, when a patient nearly commits suicide because of a mistake made by Andros, Barclay discovers the nurse with Preston, who was supposed to be on rounds in the ward, together on the hospital's rooftop.

Barclay attempts to cover for his fellow doctor, but when Andros learns she is to be fired, she threatens to expose the deceit. In the end, both Andros and Preston are forced to leave, with Fanshawe and Barclay now ready to collaborate both professionally and personally.

== Cast ==
- Ralph Bellamy as Dr. Jim Barclay
- Fay Wray as Mary Fanshawe
- Walter Connolly as Dr. Walter Selby
- Mary Carlisle as Doris Andros
- Walter Byron as Dr. Preston
- J. Farrell MacDonald as Flannigan
- Billie Seward as No. 5
- Georgia Caine as Jeff
- Katherine Clare Ward as Mrs Flannigan
- Ben Alexander as Joe
- Nora Cecil as Baxter's sister
- Sheila Darcy as Gail Drake
- Jane Darwell as Mrs. Wood
