= A Song of Sixpence =

1964 novel by A. J. Cronin

- First US edition with design of a thistle, the Scottish national flower
- Author: A. J. Cronin
- Language: English
- Publisher: Gollancz (UK); Little, Brown (US)
- Publication date: 1964
- Publication place: United Kingdom
- Media type: Print (Hardback & Paperback)
- Pages: 344 pp. (US hardback edition)
- ISBN: 0-450-03312-0

A Song of Sixpence is a novel by A. J. Cronin about the coming to manhood of Laurence Carroll and his life in Scotland. It was published in 1964. Its sequel is A Pocketful of Rye.

As with several of his other novels, Cronin drew on his own experiences growing up in Scotland for this book. The titles of both novels come from the children's nursery rhyme, "Sing a Song of Sixpence".
