= Hatter's Castle (film) =

1942 film by Lance Comfort

- Directed by: Lance Comfort
- Written by: Rodney Ackland (additional dialogue)
- Screenplay by: Paul Merzbach; Rudolf Bernauer
- Based on: novel by A. J. Cronin
- Produced by: Isadore Goldsmith
- Starring: Robert Newton; Deborah Kerr; Emlyn Williams; James Mason
- Cinematography: Mutz Greenbaum
- Edited by: Douglas Robertson
- Music by: Horace Shepherd
- Production company: Grafton Films
- Distributed by: Paramount British Pictures
- Release dates: 2 February 1942 (UK); 19 April 1948 (US)
- Running time: 102 minutes
- Country: United Kingdom
- Language: English
- Budget: $320,000

Hatter's Castle is a 1942 British film noir based on the 1931 novel Hatter's Castle by A. J. Cronin, which dramatizes the ruin that befalls a Scottish hatter set on recapturing his imagined lost nobility. The film was made by Paramount British Pictures and stars Robert Newton, Deborah Kerr, James Mason, and Emlyn Williams. It is believed to be the only film that depicts the Tay Bridge disaster.

It was shot at Denham Studios with sets designed by the art director James A. Carter.

== Plot ==
James Brodie is an authoritarian haberdasher in late 19th-century Scotland who maintains a strict household while keeping barmaid Nancy as his mistress. When her former lover Dennis visits, they conspire to set him up as her stepbrother working as a salesman in Brodie's shop. Dennis intoxicates and seduces Brodie's daughter Mary, leaving her pregnant and disconsolate when he abandons her after discovering Brodie is insolvent. Brodie forces Dennis to leave town when he surprises his mistress and Dennis together; during the confrontation Dennis reveals Mary's pregnancy to Brodie, leading him to kick her out of the house, suggesting she find Dennis before he boards the train out of town. Dennis rejects her, causing her to leave the train, presumably to throw herself from the Tay Bridge, just before the train itself plunges off the collapsing structure.

Brodie's debts jeopardize both his business, which faces competition from a large clothing chain that moves into the adjacent unit following mischief from Dennis, and his home, a grand structure that locals call "Hatter's Castle" after his pretensions that he is related to local aristocrats with the same name who nonetheless deny him as a relation. His wife receives a letter from Mary, who survived the bridge collapse but has lost her baby; she burns it in fear that Brodie will see it, not noting the location of the farm where she is working. She shares the letter's contents with Dr. Renwick, a young man who had been attracted to Mary but who her father forbade her to see, thinking him an interloper in his family's affairs. Renwick, who has discovered Mrs. Brodie is dying of cancer and has been treating her in secret, rejoices in the news that Mary is alive but has no way to find her.

As he sees his wife unable to keep his home, Brodie brings Nancy in to assist her. Humiliated, Mrs. Brodie collapses and dies, and Brodie rejects an offer from his competitor to buy his business, leaving his creditors to call in his debts. Exposed as penniless, Brodie loses Nancy and destroys his shop and inventory rather than allow it to leave his hands. His last hope is his son Angus, who is facing intense pressure to earn a scholarship and sneaks a look at the exam, costing him his chance to take it until the following year. Despondent, Angus shoots himself rather than face the wrath of his father, who rebukes himself for the tragedy but quickly transfers blame to the "Hatter's Castle" itself, denouncing it as a symbol of the ridicule and ruin he has endured. He burns the house to the ground, perishing along with it, and at his funeral Mary is reunited with Dr. Renwick, who presumably had been unable to locate her.

== Cast ==
- Robert Newton as James Brodie
- Deborah Kerr as Mary Brodie
- James Mason as Dr. Renwick
- Emlyn Williams as Dennis
- Henry Oscar as Grierson
- Enid Stamp-Taylor as Nancy
- Beatrice Varley as Mrs. Brodie
- Anthony Bateman as Angus Brodie
- June Holden as Janet
- George Merritt as Gibson
- Laurence Hanray as Dr. Lawrie
- Claude Bailey as Paxton
- Ian Fleming as Sir John Latta
- Mary Hinton as Lady Winton
- Roddy Hughes as Gordon
- David Keir as Perry
- Stuart Lindsell as Lord Winton
- Aubrey Mallalieu as Clergyman
- Brefni O'Rorke as Foyle
- Vi Kaley as Old Lady In 'The Winton Arms'
- John Slater as Card Player
- Robert Brooks Turner as Engine Driver

== Differences between novel and film ==
In the novel, Dennis is a traditional suitor of Mary's and not an opportunist or cuckolder of Brodie. Mary loses her baby when Brodie attacks her, and the Tay Bridge collapse kills Dennis on his way back to save her, not on his way out of town to abandon her and escape Brodie. Brodie has a larger family, including a son who takes Nancy from him, and the child who commits suicide is not a son but a daughter, who hasn't cheated but instead has learned she lost the scholarship. Also, while Brodie has the same volatile temper in the novel, he does not physically destroy his business or home.

== Box office ==
The film was a surprise hit. According to Kinematograph Weekly the film was one of the most popular at the British box office in 1942, after Mrs. Miniver, First of the Few, How Green was My Valley, Reap the Wild Wind, Holiday Inn, Captains of the Clouds, Sergeant York, One of Our Aircraft is Missing and before Young Mr Pitt.

== Critical reception ==
Variety wrote, "Here is a film, if ever there was one, that is best indicative of one player’s superlative performance. The player, Robert Newton, disregards tradition and enacts the featured male role without bombast or any sort of vocal pyrotechnics. There is little in the picturized version of A.J. Cronin’s bestseller that is not already stale and the plot travels along stereotyped lines to an obvious conclusion. It is, however, artistically produced, photographed and acted...The leading lady is Deborah Kerr, lovable and sincere as the daughter; the juvenile lead of Doctor Renwick is restrainedly played by James Mason." while more recently, Time Out called it "An entertaining slice of Victorian melodrama adapted from AJ Cronin's novel. Not quite Gothic, but edging that way through Newton's performance (one of his more controlled efforts) as the social-climbing Glasgow hatter...Damped down by flat direction, but the sets and camerawork are excellent."
