= Grand Canary (novel) =

1933 novel by A. J. Cronin

- First US edition
- Author: A. J. Cronin
- Language: English
- Publisher: Gollancz (UK); Little, Brown (US)
- Publication date: 1933
- Publication place: United Kingdom
- Media type: Print (Hardback & Paperback)
- Pages: 330 pp. (USA hardback edition)
- ISBN: 0-450-02047-9 (UK hardback edition)

Grand Canary is the fourth novel by British author A. J. Cronin, initially published in 1933. Compared with his other novels, it was unsuccessful.

== Plot ==
Set in Spain, the novel tells the story of Dr. Harvey Leith, an English physician who is wrongfully blamed for the deaths of three patients and leaves his country in disgrace, ultimately finding redemption when thrust into the middle of a yellow fever epidemic in the Canary Islands.

Lady Mary Fielding, who is to join her husband in the Canaries, and Dr. Leith, who plans to drown his sorrows in drink, engage in a romance on the steamship en route to their destination. She eventually comes down with the deadly fever after following the doctor into the heart of the fever area as he tends to the sick. Dr. Leith returns to England a hero, and on his arrival, learns that Lady Fielding, who was saved by the doctor's newly discovered serum, has left her husband and is coming to join him.

== Adaptation ==
A Fox film of the novel, released in 1934, was produced by Jesse L. Lasky and directed by Irving Cummings.
