= The Innkeeper's Wife =

1958 story by A. J. Cronin

"The Innkeeper's Wife" is a 1958 Christmas story, written by A. J. Cronin for The American Weekly. The story is about the wife of the innkeeper in Bethlehem who had no room for Mary and Joseph to spend the night. It originally appeared in the 21 December issue before being printed in book form by Hearst Publishing and is accompanied by Ben Stahl's illustrations.

== Characters ==
- The Innkeeper
- His wife
- Mary & Joseph
- Gabriel
- Shepherds
- Angels
- Stars
- Sheep
- Cows
- The Kings
- Pages of the Kings
- Travellers
- Criers
