= The Northern Light (novel) =

Book by Archibald Joseph Cronin

- First US edition
- Author: A. J. Cronin
- Language: English
- Publisher: Gollancz (UK); Little, Brown (US); Angus & Robertson (Aus); McClelland and Stewart (Can)
- Publication date: 1958
- Publication place: United Kingdom
- Media type: Print (Hardback & Paperback)
- Pages: 254 pp. (UK hardback edition)

The Northern Light is a 1958 novel by A. J. Cronin. In the story, The Northern Light is a respected local newspaper which has just resisted a takeover bid from a London conglomerate. The book is about the London company's unsuccessful attempt to ruin the paper by running a sensationalist rival paper.
