= Beyond This Place (2010 film) =

- Directed by: Kaleo La Belle
- Written by: Kaleo La Belle; Patrick M. Müller
- Produced by: Patrick M. Müller; Sebastian Zembol
- Cinematography: Kaleo La Belle; Simon Weber
- Edited by: Tania Stöcklin
- Music by: Sufjan Stevens; Raymond Raposa
- Release date: April 2010
- Running time: 95 minutes
- Countries: Switzerland; Germany
- Language: English

Beyond This Place is a 2010 Swiss documentary film directed by Kaleo La Belle about his relationship with his father, Cloud Rock La Belle. It won awards at Visions du Réel and the Krakow Film Festival, and was screened at other international film festivals.

== Synopsis ==
Filmmaker Kaleo La Belle sets out on a cycling trip through Oregon with his eccentric father, Cloud Rock La Belle. As he seeks answers about their failed father-son relationship, the film also asks whether the hippie ideal of freedom has failed.

== Reception ==
=== Awards ===
The film won the Grand Prix SSA/Suissimage for best Swiss feature-length film at Visions du Réel in 2010 and the Golden Horn for Best Documentary Film Over 60 Minutes at the Krakow Film Festival in 2010.

=== Critical response ===
Filmdienst described the film as an unusual self-experiment in which father and son embark on an emotional journey to work through their family history and grow closer to one another. SRF wrote that the film shows Kaleo La Belle trying to understand his father and forgive his absence, and that it brings back memories of the social upheavals of the 1960s and 1970s. Variety described the film as “uncomfortable and compelling” and called it an instructive example of personal filmmaking, adding that its strength lay in La Belle’s patience with his father.

== Festival screenings ==
In 2010, the film was screened at festivals including Visions du Réel, Hot Docs, the Krakow Film Festival, Silverdocs AFI/Discovery Documentary Film Festival, and DOK Leipzig. In 2011, it was also shown at festivals including the Solothurn Film Festival and the Göteborg International Film Festival.
