= A. J. Cronin =

Scottish physician and novelist (1896–1981)

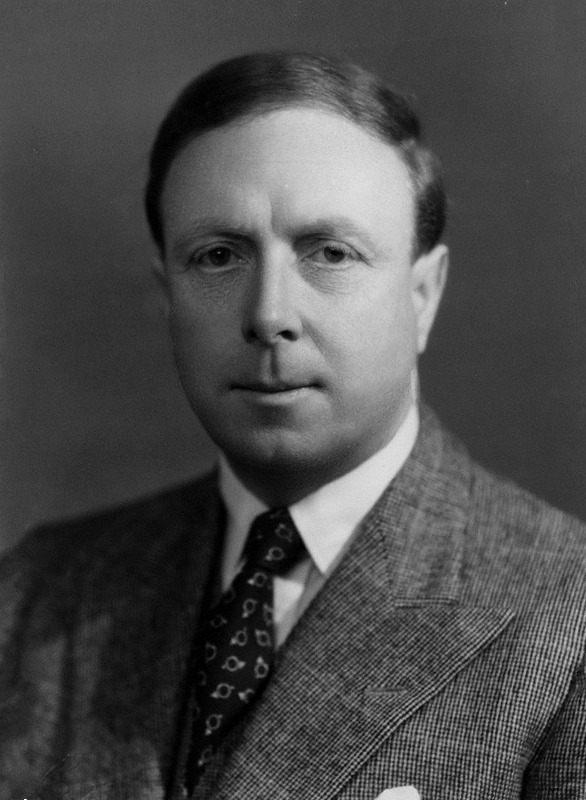
- Cronin in 1939
- Born: Archibald Joseph Cronin (Cronogue); 19 July 1896; Cardross, Dunbartonshire, Scotland
- Died: 6 January 1981 (aged 84); Montreux, Switzerland
- Resting place: Cimetière de La Tour-de-Peilz, La Tour-de-Peilz, Vaud, Switzerland
- Occupations: Physician; novelist
- Spouse: Agnes Gibson (m. 1921)
- Children: 3, including Vincent and Patrick

Archibald Joseph Cronin (Cronogue) (19 July 1896 – 6 January 1981) was a Scottish physician and novelist. His best-known novel is The Citadel (1937), about a Scottish physician who serves in a Welsh mining village, and then moves into a highly paid private practice in London where he becomes disillusioned with the greed and incompetence of some doctors. In writing the book, Cronin utilised his experiences both as a medical inspector of mines, and a physician on Harley Street. The Citadel exposed unfairness in British medicine and helped inspire the National Health Service.

The Stars Look Down, set in the North East of England, is another of his best-selling novels that used his first-hand knowledge of mining communities. The book's success prompted a film adaptation, as did The Citadel, Hatter's Castle, The Keys of the Kingdom and The Green Years. Cronin's 1935 novella Country Doctor was turned into a long-running BBC radio and TV series, Dr. Finlay's Casebook (1962–1971), set in the 1920s. There was a follow-up series in 1993–1996.

== Early life ==
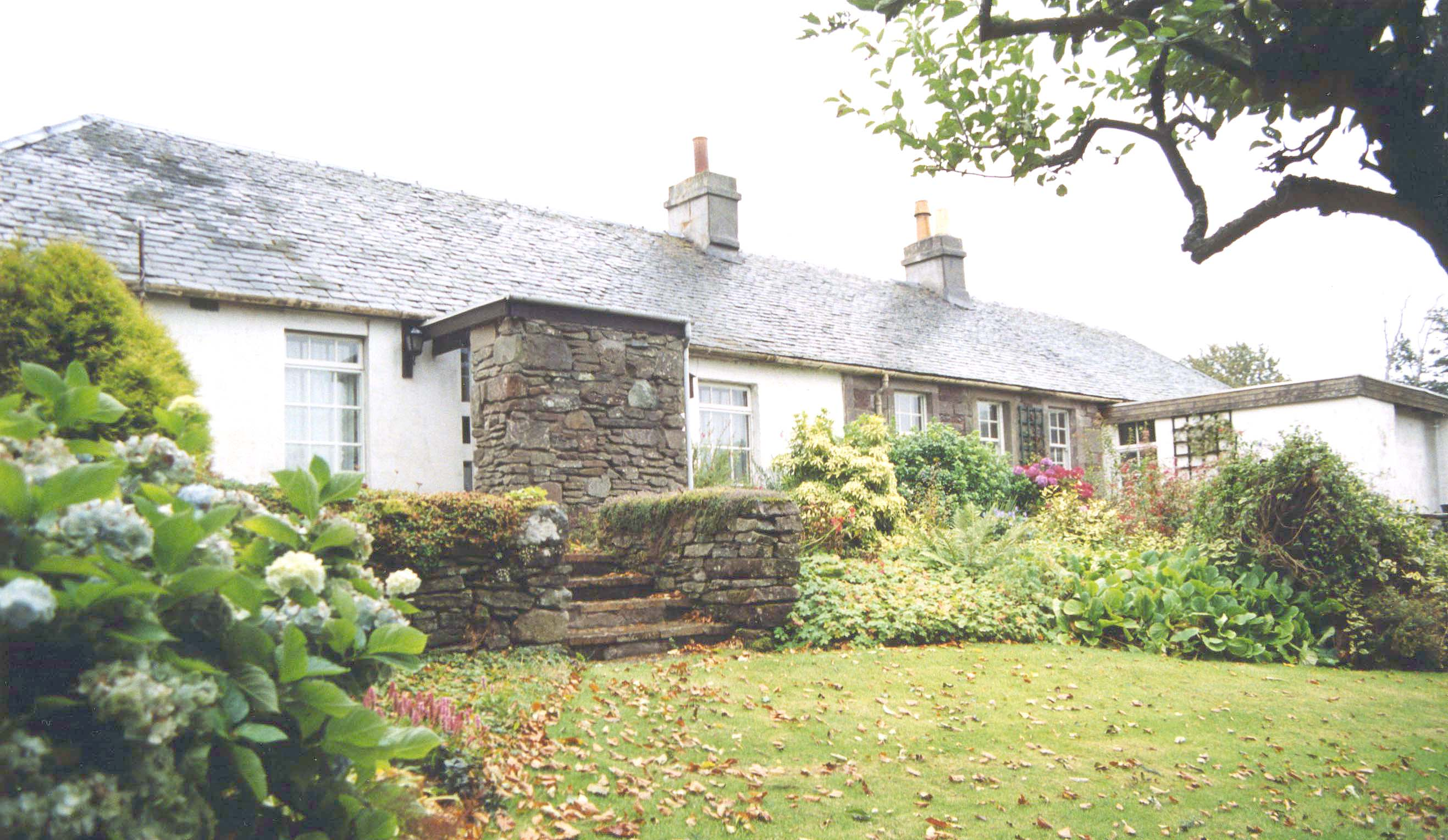
Rosebank Cottage, Cronin's birthplace

Archibald Joseph Cronin was born in Cardross, Dunbartonshire, Scotland, the only child of a Presbyterian mother, Jessie Cronin (née Montgomerie), and a Catholic father, Patrick Cronin. The future novelist often wrote of young men from similarly mixed backgrounds. His maternal grandfather, Archibald Montgomerie, was a hatter who owned a shop in Dumbarton. His paternal grandparents had emigrated from County Armagh, Ireland, and become glass and china merchants in Alexandria. His grandfather Owen Cronin (Cronogue) had his surname changed from Cronogue in 1870. Not long after their marriage, Cronin's parents settled in Helensburgh, where their son attended Grant Street School. When A. J. was seven years old, his father, an insurance agent and commercial traveller, died of tuberculosis. His mother moved the family to her parents' home in Dumbarton, and she later became the first female public health inspector in Glasgow.

Cronin was not only a precocious student at Dumbarton Academy, who won prizes in writing competitions, but an excellent athlete and association footballer. From an early age he was an avid golfer, and he enjoyed the sport throughout his life. His family then moved to Yorkhill, Glasgow, where he attended St Aloysius' College in the Garnethill area of the city. He played football for the St Aloysius' First XI, an experience he included in one of his last novels, The Minstrel Boy.

A family wish that Cronin should either study for the priesthood or practise medicine was decided by him when he chose "the lesser of two evils". He won a Carnegie scholarship to study medicine at the University of Glasgow in 1914. Having been absent in 1916–1917 for naval service, he graduated in 1919 with highest honours when obtaining the degree of MBChB. Later that year he visited India as ship's surgeon on a liner. Cronin went on to earn additional qualifications, including a Diploma in Public Health (1923) and Membership of the Royal College of Physicians (1924). In 1925 he gained an MD at the University of Glasgow with a dissertation titled "The History of Aneurysm".

== Medical career ==
During the First World War, Cronin served as a surgeon sub-lieutenant in the Royal Navy Volunteer Reserve before graduating from medical school. After the war he trained at hospitals that included Bellahouston Hospital and Lightburn Hospital in Glasgow and the Rotunda Hospital in Dublin. He undertook general practice at Garelochhead, a village on the River Clyde, and in Tredegar, a mining town in South Wales.

In 1924 he was appointed Medical Inspector of Mines for Great Britain. His survey of medical regulations in collieries and his reports on the correlation between coal-dust inhalation and pulmonary disease were published over the next few years. He later drew on his medical experiences and his research into the occupational hazards of the mining industry when writing The Stars Look Down set in Northumberland, and The Citadel set in Wales. Cronin subsequently moved to London, where he practised on Harley Street before opening a busy medical practise in Notting Hill. He was also working as medical officer for Whiteleys department store. During this time he showed an increasing interest in ophthalmology, and considered specializing in ophthalmic surgery.

== Writing career ==
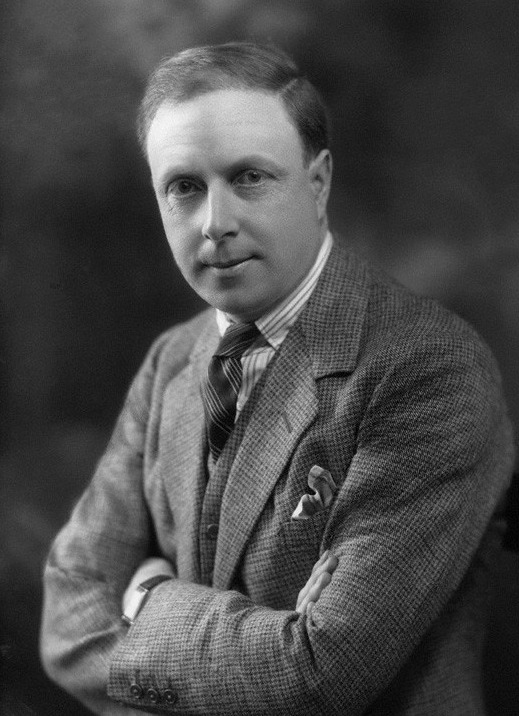
A. J. Cronin in 1931

In 1930 Cronin was diagnosed with a chronic duodenal ulcer and told to take six months' complete rest in the country on a milk diet. At Dalchenna Farm near Loch Fyne he was finally able to indulge a lifelong desire to write a novel, having previously "written nothing but prescriptions and scientific papers." He travelled to Dumbarton to conduct research for his first novel, using files from Dumbarton Library, which still has a letter from him requesting advice. He composed Hatter's Castle in three months and quickly had it accepted by Gollancz, the only publisher to which he submitted it, apparently after his wife had randomly stuck a pin in a list of publishers. It was an immediate success and launched Cronin's career as an author. He never returned to medicine.

Many of Cronin's novels were best-sellers that were translated into multiple languages. His works often dramatically mix realism, romance and social criticism, in which protagonists pursue justice for the common man, and in so doing reveal moral conflicts between the individual and society. For example, The Stars Look Down (1935) chronicles transgressions in a mining community in north-east England and an idealistic miner's rise to be a Member of Parliament (MP).

A prodigiously fast writer, Cronin liked to average 5,000 words a day, meticulously planning the details of his plots in advance. He was known to be tough in business dealings, although in private life he was a person whose "pawky humour... peppered his conversations," according to one of his editors, Peter Haining.

Cronin also contributed stories and essays to various international publications. During the Second World War he worked for the British Ministry of Information, writing articles as well as participating in radio broadcasts to foreign countries.

== Influence of The Citadel ==
The Citadel (1937), a tale of a doctor's struggle to balance scientific integrity with social obligations, helped to promote the establishment of the National Health Service (NHS) in the United Kingdom by exposing the inequity, incompetence and corruption in the medical system. In the novel, Cronin advocated a free public health service to defeat the wiles of doctors who "raised guinea-snatching and the bamboozling of patients to an art form." Cronin and Aneurin Bevan had both worked at the Tredegar Cottage Hospital in Wales, which served as one of the models for the NHS. Cronin made enemies in the medical profession, and there was a concerted effort by one group of specialists to get The Citadel banned. Nevertheless, the novel became the highest-selling book ever published by Gollancz, and eventually led to healthcare reform. Not only were the author's pioneering ideas instrumental in creating the NHS, but according to historian Raphael Samuel, the popularity of Cronin's novels played a role in the Labour Party's landslide victory in 1945.

By contrast, one of Cronin's biographers, Alan Davies, called the book's reception mixed. A few of the more vociferous medical practitioners of the day took exception to one of its many messages: that a few well-heeled doctors in fashionable practices were unethically extracting large amounts of money from their equally well-off patients. Some pointed to a lack of balance between criticism and praise for hard-working doctors. The majority accepted it for what it was, a topical novel. The press tried to incite passions within the profession in an attempt to sell copy, while Victor Gollancz followed suit in an attempt to promote the book – both overlooking that it was a work of fiction, not a scientific piece of research, and not autobiographical.

In the United States The Citadel won the National Book Award, Favorite Fiction of 1937, voted by members of the American Booksellers Association. According to a Gallup poll taken in 1939, The Citadel was voted the most interesting book readers had ever read.

== Religion ==
In several of Cronin's novels, the protagonists attempt to integrate their religious faith with the 20th century world of science and medicine. In his most overtly religious novel, The Keys of the Kingdom, an idealistic Catholic priest struggles to establish a mission in war-torn China. During his own medical career, Cronin had moved away from his religious upbringing, but he found himself drawn to religion again in the 1930s. At medical school, as he recounts in his autobiography, he had become an agnostic: "When I thought of God it was with a superior smile, indicative of biological scorn for such an outworn myth." During his practice in Wales, however, the deep religious faith of the people he worked among made him start to wonder whether "the compass of existence held more than my text-books had revealed, more than I had ever dreamed of. In short I lost my superiority, and this, though I was not then aware of it, is the first step towards finding God."

Cronin also came to feel, "If we consider the physical universe... we cannot escape the notion of a primary Creator.... Accept evolution with its fossils and elementary species, its scientific doctrine of natural causes. And still you are confronted with the same mystery, primary and profound. Ex nihilo nihil, as the Latin tag of our schooldays has it: nothing can come of nothing." This was brought home to him in London, where in his spare time he had organised a working boys' club. One day he invited a distinguished zoologist to deliver a lecture to the members. The speaker, adopting "a frankly atheistic approach", described the sequence of events leading to the emergence, "though he did not say how," of the first primitive life-form from lifeless matter. When he concluded, there was polite applause. Then, "a mild and very average youngster rose nervously to his feet," and with a slight stammer asked how there came to be anything in the first place. The naïve question took everyone by surprise. The lecturer "looked annoyed, hesitated, slowly turned red. Then, before he could answer, the whole club burst into a howl of laughter. The elaborate structure of logic offered by the test-tube realist had been crumpled by one word of challenge from a simple-minded boy."

== Family ==
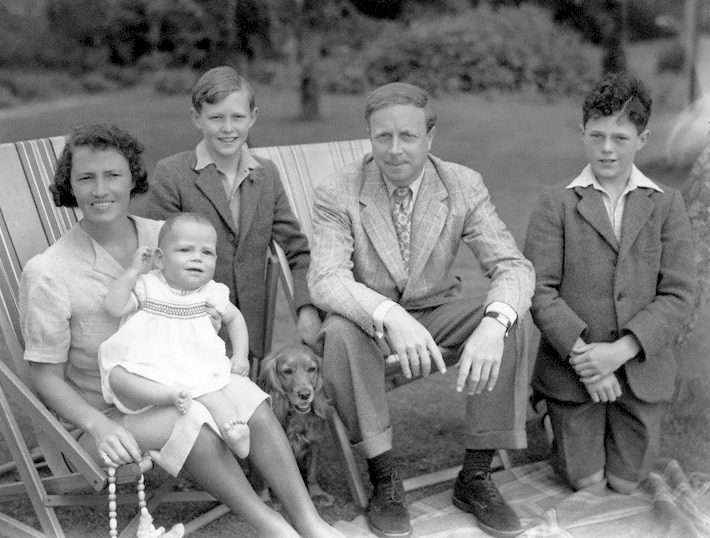
Cronin with family in 1938

It was at university that Cronin met his future wife, Agnes Mary Gibson (May, 1898–1981), who was also a medical student. She was the daughter of Robert Gibson, a master baker, and Agnes Thomson Gibson (née Gilchrist) of Hamilton, Lanarkshire. The couple married on 31 August 1921. As a physician, Mary worked with her husband briefly in the dispensary while he was employed by the Tredegar Medical Aid Society. She also assisted him with his practice in London. When he became an author, she would proofread his manuscripts. Their first son, Vincent, was born in Tredegar in 1924. Their second, Patrick, was born in London in 1926, and Andrew, their youngest, in London in 1937.

With his stories being adapted for Hollywood films, Cronin and his family moved to the U.S. in 1939, living in Bel Air, California, Nantucket, Massachusetts, Greenwich, Connecticut, and Blue Hill, Maine. In 1945, the Cronins sailed back to England aboard the RMS Queen Mary, staying briefly in Hove and then in Raheny, Ireland, before returning to the U.S. the following year. They took up residence at the Carlyle Hotel in New York City and then in Deerfield, Massachusetts, before settling in 1947 in New Canaan, Connecticut. They also frequented summer homes in Bermuda and Cap-d'Ail, France.

== Later years ==
Cronin eventually returned to Europe, to reside in Lucerne and Montreux, Switzerland, for the last 25 years of his life. He continued to write into his eighties. He included among his friends Laurence Olivier, Charlie Chaplin and Audrey Hepburn, to whose first son he was a godfather. Richard E. Berlin was the godfather of his son Andrew.

Although the latter part of his life was spent entirely abroad, Cronin retained great affection for the district of his childhood, writing in 1972 to a local teacher: "Although I have travelled the world over I must say in all sincerity that my heart belongs to Dumbarton.... In my study there is a beautiful 17th-century coloured print of the Rock.... I even follow with great fervour the fortunes of the Dumbarton football team." Further evidence of Cronin's lifelong support of Dumbarton F.C. comes from a framed typewritten letter hanging in the foyer of the club's stadium. The letter, written in 1972 and addressed to the club's then secretary, congratulates the team on its return to the top division after a gap of 50 years. He recalls his childhood support for it, and on occasion being "lifted over" the turnstiles (a common practice in times past so that children did not have to pay).

Cronin died on 6 January 1981 in Montreux. His family members said the cause of death was acute bronchitis. He is interred at La Tour-de-Peilz. Many of his writings, including published and unpublished literary manuscripts, drafts, letters, school exercise books and essays, and laboratory books and his M.D. thesis, are held at the National Library of Scotland and at the Harry Ransom Center in the University of Texas.

Cronin's widow Agnes died five months later on 10 June 1981, and after cremation, her ashes were buried next to him.

== Honours ==
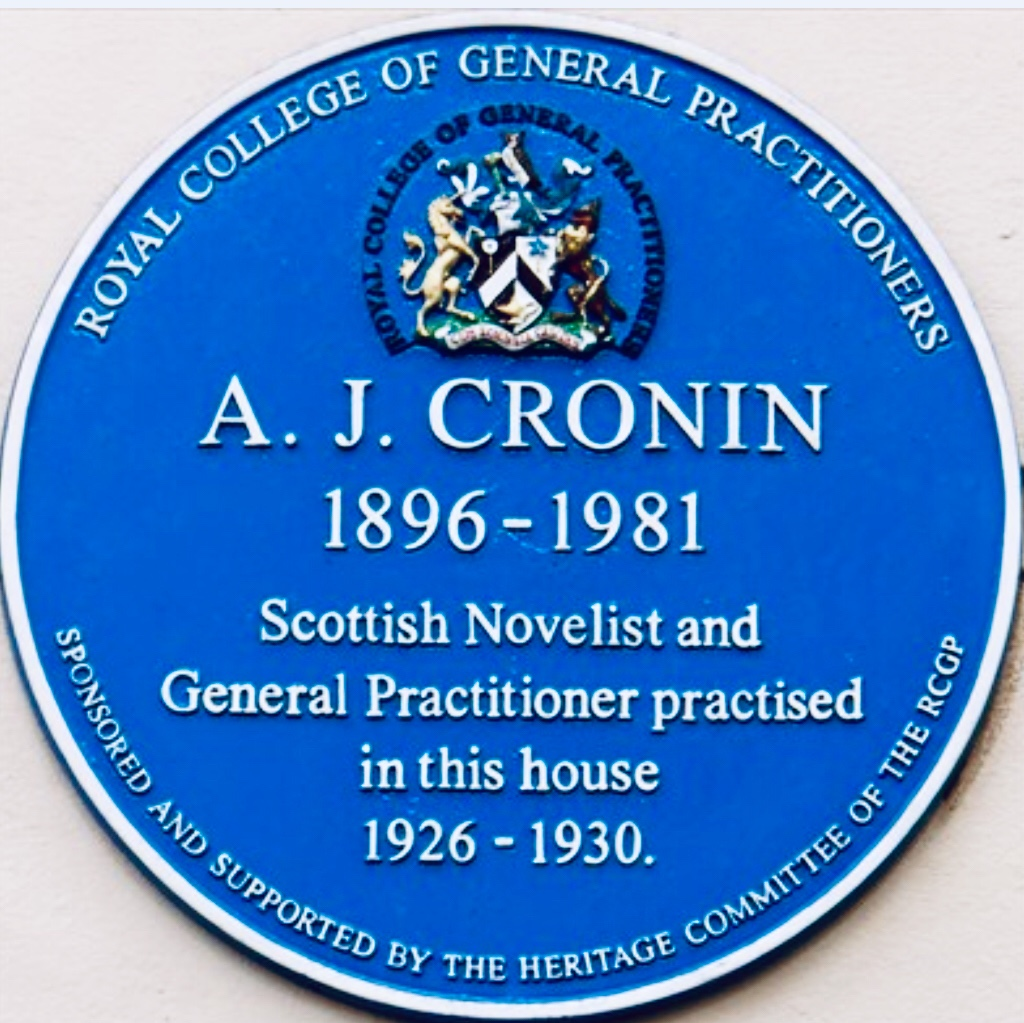
Cronin blue plaque

- National Book Award (U.S.), Favorite Novel of 1937, for The Citadel
- Litt.D. from Bowdoin College (1942) and Lafayette College (1954)
- On 27 March 2015 a blue plaque commemorating Cronin was unveiled by the RCGP at 152 Westbourne Grove in Notting Hill

== Bibliography ==
- Hatter's Castle (novel, 1931), ISBN 0-450-03486-0
- Three Loves (novel, 1932), ISBN 0-450-02202-1
- Kaleidoscope in "K" (novella, 1933)
- Grand Canary (novel, 1933), ISBN 0-450-02047-9
- Woman of the Earth (novella, 1933) ISBN 978-1543185812
- Country Doctor (novella, 1935) ISBN 978-1523347100
- The Stars Look Down (novel, 1935), ISBN 0-450-00497-X
- Lady with Carnations (serial novel, 1935), ISBN 0-450-03631-6
- The Citadel (novel, 1937), ISBN 0-450-01041-4
- Vigil in the Night (serial novella, 1939) ISBN 978-0-9727439-6-9
- Jupiter Laughs (play, 1940), ISBN B000OHEBC2
- Child of Compassion (novelette, 1940), ISBN 978-1530135349
- Enchanted Snow (novel, 1940), ISBN 978-1523950119
- The Valorous Years (serial novella, 1940) ISBN 978-0-9727439-7-6
- The Keys of the Kingdom (novel, 1941), ISBN 0-450-01042-2
- Adventures of a Black Bag (short stories, 1943, rev. 1969), ISBN 0-450-00306-X
- The Green Years (novel, 1944), ISBN 0-450-01820-2
- The Man Who Couldn't Spend Money (novelette, 1946), ISBN 978-1530135349
- Shannon's Way (novel, 1948; sequel to The Green Years), ISBN 0-450-03313-9
- Gracie Lindsay (serial novel, 1949), ISBN 0-450-04536-6
- The Spanish Gardener (novel, 1950), ISBN 0-450-01108-9
- Beyond This Place (novel, 1950), ISBN 0-450-01708-7
- Adventures in Two Worlds (autobiography, 1952), ISBN 0-450-03195-0
- Escape from Fear (serial novella, 1954), ISBN 978-1523326921
- A Thing of Beauty (novel, 1956), ISBN 0-515-03379-0; also published as Crusader's Tomb (1956), ISBN 0-450-01394-4
- The Northern Light (novel, 1958), ISBN 0-450-01538-6
- The Innkeeper's Wife (short story republished as a book, 1958), ISBN 978-1543220940
- The Cronin Omnibus (three earlier novels, collected in 1958), ISBN 0-575-05836-6
- The Native Doctor; also published as An Apple in Eden (novel, 1959), ISBN 978-1523392537
- The Judas Tree (novel, 1961), ISBN 0-450-01393-6
- A Song of Sixpence (novel, 1964), ISBN 0-450-03312-0
- Adventures of a Black Bag (short stories, 1969), ISBN 0-450-00306X
- A Pocketful of Rye (novel, 1969; sequel to A Song of Sixpence), ISBN 0-450-39010-1
- Desmonde (novel, 1975), ISBN 0-316-16163-2; also published as The Minstrel Boy (1975), ISBN 0-450-03279-5
- Doctor Finlay of Tannochbrae (short stories, 1978), ISBN 0-450-04246-4
- Dr. Finlay's Casebook (omnibus edition, combining Adventures of a Black Bag and Doctor Finlay of Tannochbrae, 2010), ISBN 978-1-84158-854-4
- Further Adventures of a Country Doctor (twelve late-1930s short stories, collected in 2017), ISBN 978-1543289190

== Selected periodical publications ==
- "Lily of the Valley", Hearst's International-Cosmopolitan, (February 1936), ISBN 978-1543220940
- "The Citadel..." The Australian Women's Weekly, (9 October 1937) Vol.5 # 18, begin serialization.
- "Mascot for Uncle", Good Housekeeping, (February 1938), ISBN 978-1530135349
- "The Most Unforgettable Character I Ever Met: The Doctor of Lennox", Reader's Digest, 35 (September 1939): 26–30.
- "The Portrait", Hearst's International-Cosmopolitan, (December 1940), ISBN 978-1543220940
- "Turning Point of My Career", Reader's Digest, 38 (May 1941): 53–57.
- "Diogenes in Maine", Reader's Digest, 39 (August 1941): 11–13.
- "Reward of Mercy", Reader's Digest, 39 (September 1941): 25–37.
- "How I Came to Write a Novel of a Priest", Life, 11 (20 October 1941): 64–66.
- "Drama in Everyday Life", Reader's Digest, 42 (March 1943): 83–86.
- "Candles in Vienna", Reader's Digest, 48 (June 1946): 1–3.
- "Star of Hope Still Rises", Reader's Digest, 53 (December 1948): 1–3.
- "Johnny Brown Stays Here", Reader's Digest, 54 (January 1949): 9–12.
- "Two Gentlemen of Verona", Reader's Digest, 54 (February 1949): 1–5.
- "Greater Gift", Reader's Digest, 54 (March 1949): 88–91.
- "The One Chance", Redbook, (March 1949), ISBN 978-1543220940
- "An Irish Rose", Reader's Digest, 56 (January 1950): 21–24.
- "Monsieur le Maire", Reader's Digest, 58 (January 1951): 52–56.
- "Best Investment I Ever Made", Reader's Digest, 58 (March 1951): 25–28.
- "Quo Vadis?", Reader's Digest, 59 (December 1951): 41–44.
- "Tombstone for Nora Malone," Reader's Digest, 60 (January 1952): 99–101.
- "When You Dread Failure", Reader's Digest, 60 (February 1952): 21–24.
- "What I Learned at La Grande Chartreuse", Reader's Digest, 62 (February 1953): 73–77.
- "Grace of Gratitude", Reader's Digest, 62 (March 1953): 67–70.
- "Thousand and One Lives", Reader's Digest, 64 (January 1954): 8–11.
- "How to Stop Worrying", Reader's Digest, 64 (May 1954): 47–50.
- "Don't Be Sorry for Yourself!", Reader's Digest, 66 (February 1955): 97–100.
- "Unless You Deny Yourself", Reader's Digest, 68 (January 1956): 54–56.
- "Resurrection of Joao Jacinto", Reader's Digest, 89 (November 1966): 153–157.

== Film adaptations ==
- 1934 – Once to Every Woman (from short story, Kaleidoscope in "K"), directed by Lambert Hillyer, featuring Ralph Bellamy, Fay Wray, Walter Connolly, Mary Carlisle, and Walter Byron
- 1934 – Grand Canary, directed by Irving Cummings, featuring Warner Baxter, Madge Evans, Marjorie Rambeau, Zita Johann, and H. B. Warner
- 1938 – The Citadel, directed by King Vidor, featuring Robert Donat, Rosalind Russell, Ralph Richardson, and Rex Harrison
- 1940 – Vigil in the Night, directed by George Stevens, featuring Carole Lombard, Brian Aherne, Anne Shirley, and Robert Coote
- 1940 – The Stars Look Down, directed by Carol Reed, narrated by Lionel Barrymore (US version), featuring Michael Redgrave, Margaret Lockwood, Emlyn Williams, Nancy Price, and Cecil Parker
- 1941 – Shining Victory (from play, Jupiter Laughs), directed by Irving Rapper, featuring James Stephenson, Geraldine Fitzgerald, Donald Crisp, Barbara O'Neil, and Bette Davis
- 1942 – Hatter's Castle, directed by Lance Comfort, featuring Robert Newton, Deborah Kerr, James Mason, Emlyn Williams, and Enid Stamp Taylor
- 1944 – The Keys of the Kingdom, directed by John M. Stahl, featuring Gregory Peck, Thomas Mitchell, Vincent Price, Rose Stradner, Edmund Gwenn, Benson Fong, Cedric Hardwicke, Jane Ball, and Roddy McDowall
- 1946 – The Green Years, directed by Victor Saville, featuring Charles Coburn, Tom Drake, Beverly Tyler, Hume Cronyn, Gladys Cooper, Dean Stockwell, Selena Royle, and Jessica Tandy
- 1953 – Ich suche Dich ("I Seek You" – from play, Jupiter Laughs), directed by O. W. Fischer, featuring O. W. Fischer, Anouk Aimée, Nadja Tiller, and Otto Brüggemann
- 1955 – Sabar Uparey (from novel, Beyond This Place), directed by Agradoot, featuring Uttam Kumar, Suchitra Sen, Chhabi Biswas, Pahari Sanyal and Nitish Mukherjee
- 1957 – The Spanish Gardener, directed by Philip Leacock, featuring Dirk Bogarde, Jon Whiteley, Michael Hordern, Cyril Cusack, and Lyndon Brook
- 1958 – Kala Pani ("Black Water" – from novel, Beyond This Place)–directed by Raj Khosla, featuring Dev Anand, Madhubala, Nalini Jaywant, and Agha
- 1959 – Web of Evidence (from novel, Beyond This Place), directed by Jack Cardiff, featuring Van Johnson, Vera Miles, Emlyn Williams, Bernard Lee, and Jean Kent
- 1967 – Poola Rangadu (from novel, Beyond This Place), directed by Adurthi Subba Rao, featuring ANR, Jamuna, and Nageshwara Rao Akkineni
- 1971 – Tere Mere Sapne ("Our Dreams" – from the novel The Citadel), directed by Vijay Anand, featuring Dev Anand, Mumtaz, Hema Malini, Vijay Anand, and Prem Nath
- 1972 – Jiban Saikate (from novel, The Citadel)–directed by Swadesh Sarkar, featuring Soumitra Chatterjee and Aparna Sen
- 1975 – Mausam ("Seasons", from the novel The Judas Tree), directed by Gulzar, featuring Sharmila Tagore, Sanjeev Kumar, Dina Pathak, and Om Shivpuri
- 1982 – Madhura Swapnam (from the novel The Citadel), directed by K. Raghavendra Rao, featuring Jaya Prada, Jayasudha, and Krishnamraju

== Selected television credits ==
- 1955 – Escape From Fear (CBS), featuring William Lundigan, Tristram Coffin, Mari Blanchard, Howard Duff, and Jay Novello
- 1957 – Beyond This Place (CBS), featuring Farley Granger, Peggy Ann Garner, Max Adrian, Brian Donlevy, and Shelley Winters
- 1958 – Nicholas (TV Tupi), featuring Ricardinho, Roberto de Cleto, and Rafael Golombeck
- 1960 – The Citadel (ABC), featuring James Donald, Ann Blyth, Lloyd Bochner, Hugh Griffith, and Torin Thatcher
- 1960 – The Citadel, featuring Eric Lander, Zena Walker, Jack May, Elizabeth Shepherd, and Richard Vernon
- 1962–1971 – Dr. Finlay's Casebook (BBC), featuring Bill Simpson, Andrew Cruickshank, and Barbara Mullen
- 1962 and 1963 – The Ordeal of Dr Shannon (NBC & ITV), featuring Rod Taylor, Elizabeth MacLennan, and Ronald Fraser
- 1963–1965 – Memorandum van een dokter, featuring Bram van der Vlugt, Rob Geraerds, and Fien Berghegge
- 1964 – La Cittadella (RAI), featuring Alberto Lupo, Anna Maria Guarnieri, Fosco Giachetti, Loretta Goggi and Eleonora Rossi Drago
- 1964 – Novi asistent, featuring Dejan Dubajić, Ljiljana Jovanović, Nikola Simić and Milan Srdoč
- 1967 – O Jardineiro Espanhol (TV Tupi), featuring Ednei Giovenazzi and Osmano Cardoso
- 1971 – E le stelle stanno a guardare (RAI), featuring Orso Maria Guerrini, Andrea Checchi, and Giancarlo Giannini
- 1975 – The Stars Look Down (Granada), featuring Ian Hastings, Susan Tracy, Alun Armstrong, and Christian Rodska
- 1976 – Slečna Meg a talíř Ming (Československá Televise), featuring Marie Rosulková, Eva Svobodová, Petr Kostka, and Svatopluk Beneš
- 1977 – Les Années d'illusion (TF1), featuring Yves Brainville, Josephine Chaplin, Michel Cassagne, and Laurence Calame
- 1983 – The Citadel (BBC and PBS), featuring Ben Cross, Clare Higgins, Tenniel Evans, and Gareth Thomas
- 1989 — Angel's Choice (MBC)” was featured as a storyline by mixing “The Citadel” and “The Green Years”.
- 1993–1996 – Doctor Finlay (ITV and PBS), featuring David Rintoul, Annette Crosbie, Ian Bannen, Jessica Turner, and Jason Flemyng
- 2003 – La Cittadella (Titanus), featuring Massimo Ghini, Barbora Bobuľová, Franco Castellano, and Anna Galiena

== Selected radio credits ==
- 1940 – The Citadel (The Campbell Playhouse CBS), featuring Orson Welles, Geraldine Fitzgerald, Ernest Chappell, Everett Sloane, George Coulouris, and Ray Collins
- 1970–1978 – Dr. Finlay's Casebook (BBC Radio 4), featuring Bill Simpson, Andrew Cruickshank, and Barbara Mullen (rebroadcast in 2003 on BBC 7)
- 2001–2002 – Adventures of a Black Bag (BBC Radio 4), featuring John Gordon Sinclair, Brian Pettifer, Katy Murphy, and Celia Imrie
- 2007–2009 – Doctor Finlay: The Further Adventures of a Black Bag (BBC Radio 7), featuring John Gordon Sinclair, Brian Pettifer, and Katy Murphy

== See also ==
- Physician writer
