= Hatter's Castle =

1931 novel by A. J. Cronin

- First UK edition
- Author: A. J. Cronin
- Language: English
- Publisher: Gollancz (UK); Little, Brown (US)
- Publication date: 1931
- Publication place: United Kingdom
- Media type: Print (hardback and paperback)
- Pages: 637 pp. (UK hardback edition)
- ISBN: 0-450-03486-0

Hatter's Castle (1931) is the first novel of author A. J. Cronin. The story is set in 1879, in the fictional town of Levenford, on the Firth of Clyde. The plot revolves around many characters and has many subplots, all of which relate to the life of the hatter, James Brodie, whose narcissism and cruelty gradually destroy his family and life. The book was made into a successful film in 1942 starring Robert Newton, Deborah Kerr, and James Mason.

== Characters ==
The main characters are James Brodie (the hatter and tyrannical patriarch of the Brodie family), Mary Brodie (James's elder daughter, also one of the central characters, appearing throughout the first and last section of the novel), Matthew Brodie (James's only son and oldest child in the family who also plays a significant role in the novel), Nessie Brodie (James's younger daughter and favourite, who remains one of the background characters until the end of the story), Mrs. Brodie (James's fragile wife who is never treated as anything more than a servant by her husband), Grandma Brodie (James's mother who lives with the Brodie family), Dennis Foyle (A young Irishman who has a relationship with Mary), Nancy (James's mistress) and Dr. Renwick (a character who becomes more involved in the Brodies' family life towards the end of the novel).

== Plot summary ==
The book is in three sections.

=== Part 1 ===
The novel begins with some insight into the life of the Brodie household, where James Brodie seems to have everyone under his thumb. The main event that triggers the events in the novel is Mary Brodie's relationship with her first love, Dennis. Early in the story, Mary, who has occasionally met Dennis at the library, is invited by him to go to the fair in the town. She sneaks out without her family's knowledge and not only goes to the fair, but later on that night kisses and eventually has sex with Dennis, which we later learn, results in pregnancy.

This event of her unwanted pregnancy is the main plot in the first third of the novel, titled "Section One". We realise that Mary is pregnant, and when she is six months pregnant she makes a plan with Dennis to elope. Even though Mary was only seventeen, there would have been no legal problem with her marriage since the English law which, until 1970, generally required people under twenty-one to have parental consent to marry, did not apply in Scotland. But three days before Dennis is due to whisk Mary away, there is a massive storm, and she begins to go into labour. Mrs. Brodie stumbles into Mary's room and begins to scream at the fact that her daughter is with child, and calls James himself to sort it out. After being kicked in the stomach repeatedly by her father and thrown out on her face into the pouring rain (while in labour), she tries to reach safety. Mary nearly drowns in a river before finding a barn where she gives birth to her premature child, which dies. Dennis, who was travelling on a train to rescue Mary, is killed when the train derails in a massive storm and plunges into the River Tay below, a retelling of the actual Tay Bridge disaster of 1879.

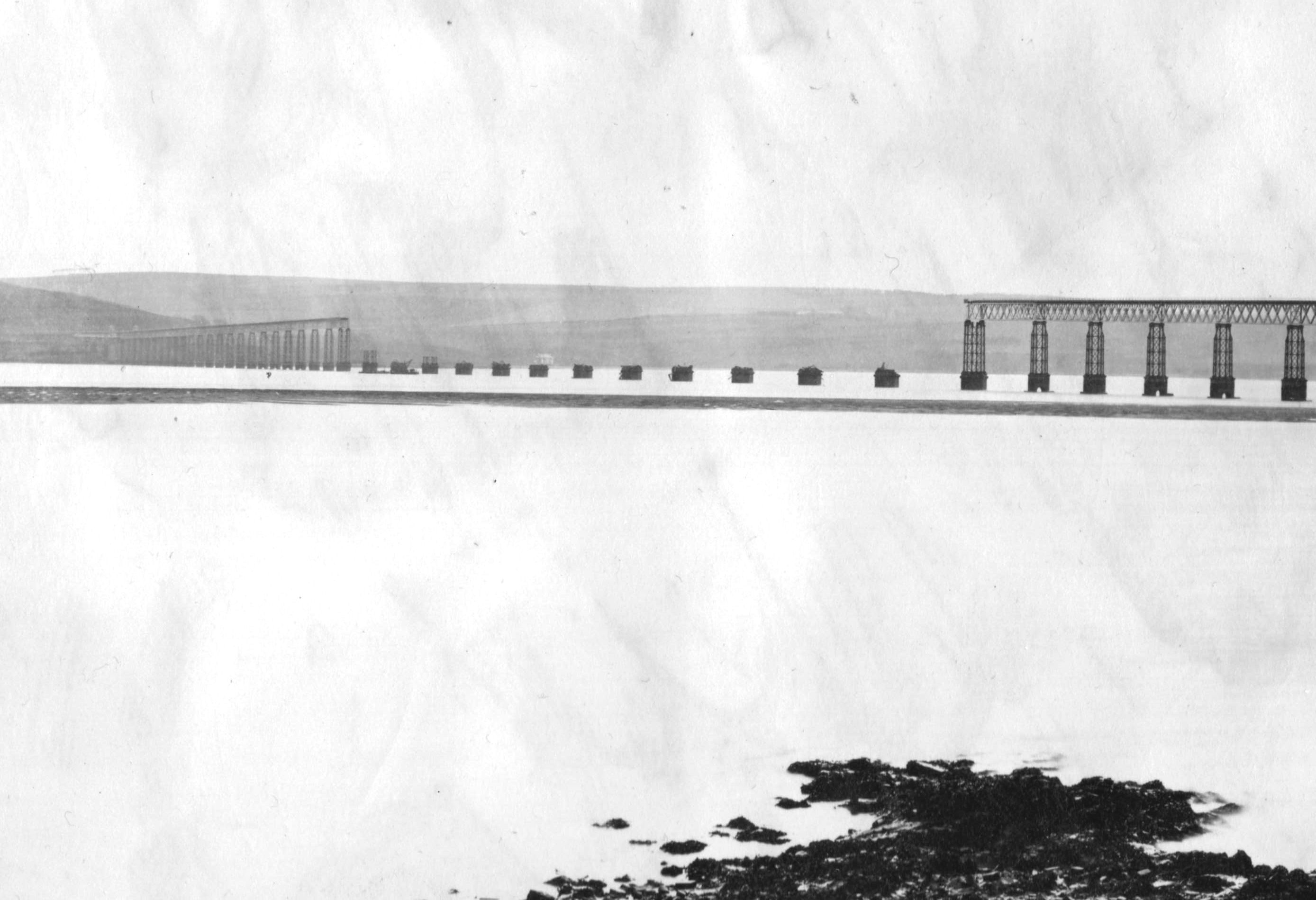
Fallen Tay Bridge from the north

=== Part 2 ===
In the second part of the book, James Brodie's business as a hatter is destroyed. A rival company moves next door and attracts all his customers. Part of this is due to Brodie's pride, as the customers are driven away by his delusions of superiority. As his profits decrease, so does the weekly salary, so Mamma is left to deal with making the most of what little they have left for the family. Her illness (cancer of the womb) and the chronic stress of living with James Brodie hasten her death. After her death, Brodie's mistress, Nancy, moves in. Later she goes off abroad with Brodie's son Matt, and Brodie is left with only his younger daughter Nessie, and his aged mother, Grandma Brodie.

=== Part 3 ===
In the third part of the book, Brodie forces Nessie to study hard so as to win the "Latta", a valuable bursarship. He wants this not so much to provide a good future for his daughter, as to show that she is better than his rival's son, who is also entered for it. Under his threats and the dreadful fear of failure, she labours on with it, making herself mentally and physically ill. Nessie secretly writes to Mary asking her to come back, so she will have her company and comfort. Under pretext of coming to help with housework, Mary writes to her father, who initially refuses her return. After discovering that Nancy has deserted him, he writes again permitting Mary to come back, so she does.

Nessie obtains notice of the Latta result before her father sees it. Finding that her rival has won it and fearing her father, she sends Mary out to the chemist on the pretext of getting some medicine, then dresses up and hangs herself.

The story concludes with Dr. Renwick, who has been seeing Mary, taking her away with him to marry her.

== The novel in other countries ==
- In Russian "Hatter's Castle" was first published in 1955 under the name "Brodie's Castle", which has not changed since then.

== See also ==
- Gretna Green
- Tay Bridge disaster
