= A Thing of Beauty =

1956 novel by A. J. Cronin

- First US edition
- Author: A. J. Cronin
- Cover artist: George Salter
- Language: English
- Publisher: Gollancz (UK); Little, Brown (US)
- Publication date: 1955, 1956 By A.J. Cronin
- Publication place: United Kingdom
- Media type: Print (Hardback & Paperback)
- Pages: 440 pp. (US hardback edition)
- ISBN: 0-515-03379-0 (US hardback edition)

A Thing of Beauty is a novel by author A. J. Cronin, initially published in 1956, with the alternate title of Crusader's Tomb. It tells the story of Stephen Desmonde, an English painter who struggles for recognition in a conventional world, sacrificing everything for his passion for art. The title is a reference to John Keats' 1818 poem, Endymion, which begins with "A thing of beauty is a joy for ever."

The novel was listed on The New York Times’ 100 Outstanding Books list in 1956.
