= Beyond This Place (DuPont Show of the Month) =

- DuPont Show of the Month episode
- Episode no.: Season 1 Episode 3
- Directed by: Sidney Lumet
- Written by: Vance Bourjaily; A. J. Cronin
- Original air date: November 25, 1957

Guest appearances
- Farley Granger; Peggy Ann Garner; Torin Thatcher; Max Adrian; Brian Donlevy; Shelley Winters

Episode chronology
← Previous "The Prince and the Pauper"	Next → "Junior Miss"

"Beyond This Place" is a 1957 American television adaptation from A. J. Cronin's 1950 novel Beyond This Place. It is a live television production, possibly preserved on kinescope. The show was directed by Sidney Lumet and produced by David Susskind. It was the third episode of the first season of The DuPont Show of the Month, which was broadcast on CBS. The dramatization starred Farley Granger, Peggy Ann Garner, Torin Thatcher, Max Adrian, Brian Donlevy, and Shelley Winters.

== Cast ==
- Farley Granger as Paul Burgess
- Peggy Ann Garner as Lena Anderson
- Hurd Hatfield as Oswald
- Ruth White as Mrs. Burgess
- Torin Thatcher as Rees Mathry
- Max Adrian as Sir Matthew Sprott
- Brian Donlevy as Constable Dale
- Shelley Winters as Louisa Burt
- Farrell Pelly as Prusty
- Eduard Franz as Dunn
- Fritz Weaver as Charlie Castle
