= Ranganayakamma =

Indian Telugu language Marxist writer and critic

- రంగనాయకమ్మ
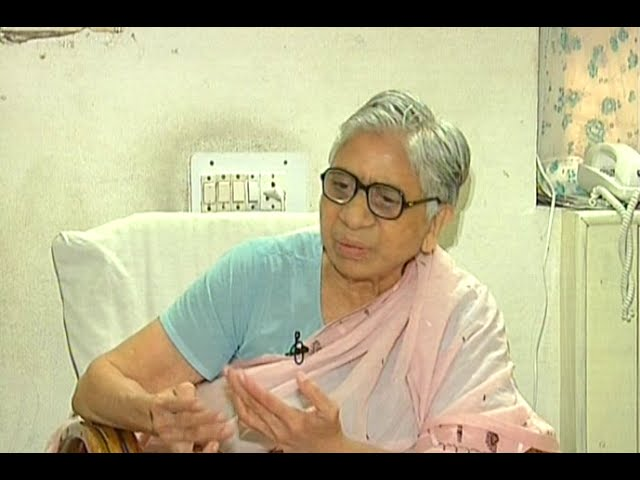
- Ranganayakamma in an interview with TV9
- Born: 21 September 1939; Bommidi village near Tadepalligudem, West Godavari district, Andhra Pradesh, India
- Occupations: Novelist, short story writer, critic, essayist
- Writing career
- Language: Telugu

Ranganayakamma (Telugu: రంగనాయకమ్మ) (also known as Muppala Ranganayakamma; born 1939) is an Indian Marxist writer and critic. The main theme in her works is gender equality and the depiction of women's family life in India.

She has been writing since 1955. To date, she has written about 15 novels, 70 short stories, and many essays. She published about 60 volumes in all. She is a leading proponent of communism and feminism. She won the Andhra Pradesh Government Sahitya Akademi Award for the novel Balipeetam in 1965.

== Early life ==
Ranganayakamma was born in Bommidi village near Tadepalligudem in West Godavari district of Andhra Pradesh on September 21, 1939. Her maiden name is Daddanala. In her early days of writing (before her marriage) she wrote some stories in her maiden name . She have six siblings — one elder brother (deceased), one elder sister, and four younger sisters. She is well educated and clever among her siblings. She passed SSLC (Secondary School Leaving Certificate) examination in 1955. She could not continue her studies because her parents could not financially afford to send her to a far-off college.

== Personal life ==
Her marriage was a traditionally arranged one. Due to incompatibility, she left the first marriage after 12 years (1958–1970) and came to be known as "Ranganayakamma" ("Muppala" was the surname of her first husband).

== Career ==
She has been writing since 1955. To date, she has written about 15 novels, 70 short stories, and many essays. She published about 60 volumes in all. The main theme in her works is gender equality and the depiction of women's family life in India.

Her novels were some of the first to use language closer to colloquial speech rather than the former Telugu literary standard (granthika bhasa).

Her first novel, Krishnaveni, was published in the late 1950s and discusses gendered expectations in relationships through the portrayal of two strained marriages that are interconnected through the titular character's liaison with the other husband; there are two endings, an idealized, "happy" one for the expectations of Indian audiences and a more "realistic" gloomy one. She wrote Balipeetam (Sacrificial Altar), a popular novel that was serialized in Andhra Prabha in 1962. The novel is about a Brahmin widow, Aruna, who marries a Dalit social worker, Bhaskar, exploring the stigma placed on intercaste marriages and widows in society.

She came into contact with Marxism in 1973 and began to write from that perspective since then. She is best known for her work Ramayana Vishavruksham (transl. Ramayana: The Poisonous Tree), published in 1974, criticizing the Hindu epic Ramayana from Marxist point of view. This book was a three-volume series and is now (since March 2005) available as a single volume with 746 pages in Royal size. This book is now (since August 2004) available in English.

Another important writing of hers is the Marx Capital parichayam, an introduction to Marx's Das Kapital in 3 volumes. The first volume was published in 1978 and there were no Telugu translations of Das Kapital available at that time. She wrote a three-volume novel Janaki Vimukti (meaning "Emanicipation of Janaki"), arguing that Marxism is the correct path to gender equality.

The most outstanding feature of Ranganayakamma's writings is that she writes in the most lucid manner, and even her opponents acknowledge this fact.

In 2001, she wrote For the solution of the ‘Caste’ question Buddha is not enough Ambedkar is not enough either Marx is a Must in which she made a critical analysis of Ambedkar's movement and pointed out the inconsistencies in his writings. In the book she describes the need for understanding Marxism to bring solution to the issue of caste.

She won the Andhra Pradesh Government Sahitya Akademi Award for Balipeetam in 1965, and it was made into a film in 1975. However, since she came into contact with Marxism, she started opposing awards, whether governmental or non-governmental. She minimised writing novels as she felt there is a lot of work to do for Marxism and preaching Marxism to Telugu people. She emphasised the fact that unless the Proletariat knows the basic ideology of Communism, any revolution will not sustain. Her point of view is well reflected in her works like China lo Em Jarugutundi (What's happening in China) and Soviet Russia lo em jarigindi (What happened in Soviet Russia). Both books are introduction to Charles Bethalham's works.

== Literary works ==
- Janaki Vimukti (జానకి విముక్తి)
- Kallu Terichina Sita (కళ్ళు తెరిచిన సీత)
- Rachayitri (రచయత్రి)
- Balipeetham (బలిపీఠం)
- Krishnaveni (క్రిష్ణవేణి)
- Pekamedalu (పేకమేడలు)
- Koolina Godalu (కూలిన గోడలు)
- Stree (స్త్రీ)
- Poola Rangadu (movie dialogues)
- Chaduvukunna Kamala (చదువుకున్న కమల)
- Kala Enduku? (కళ ఎందుకు?)
- Sweet Home (స్వీట్ హోం)
- Andhakaaramlo (అంధకారంలో)
- Ramayana Vishavruksham (రామాయణ విషవృక్షం)
- Vedalu Em Chepthunnayi? (వేదాలు ఏం చెప్తున్నాయి?)
- Donga Thallithandrulu Untaru Jagratha (దొంగ తల్లిదండ్రులు ఉంటారు జాగ్రత్త!)
- Idandee Mahabharatam (ఇదండీ మహాభారతం)
- For the solution of the ‘Caste’ question Buddha is not enough Ambedkar is not enough either Marx is a Must

=== Marxism related works ===
- Capital Parichayam (Part 1 and Part 2) (కాపిటల్ పరిచయం [1,2 భాగాలు])
- Chinalo Em Jarugutundi (చైనాలో ఏం జరుగుతోంది?)
- Soviet Russia lo Em Jarigindi (సోవియెట్ రష్యాలో ఏం జరిగింది?)
- Communist party Ela undakudadu (కమ్యూనిస్టు పార్టీ ఎలా ఉండకూడదు?)
- China lo Samskrithika Viplavam (చైనా లో సాంస్కృతిక విప్లవం)
- Paris Commune (పారిస్ కమ్మ్యూన్)
- Communist party manifesto (కమ్మ్యూనిస్ట్ పార్టీ మానిఫెస్టో)
- Pillala Kosam Arthasastram (పిల్లల కోసం అర్థశాస్త్రం)
