= Beyond This Place (1959 film) =

Film by Jack Cardiff

- UK release poster
- Directed by: Jack Cardiff
- Written by: Ken Taylor
- Story by: A. J. Cronin
- Based on: Beyond This Place by A. J. Cronin
- Produced by: Maxwell Setton; John R. Sloan
- Starring: Van Johnson; Vera Miles; Emlyn Williams; Bernard Lee
- Cinematography: Wilkie Cooper
- Edited by: Ernest Walter
- Music by: Douglas Gamley
- Distributed by: Renown Pictures
- Release date: 18 October 1959
- Running time: 90 minutes
- Country: United Kingdom
- Language: English

Beyond This Place (released in the United States as Web of Evidence) is a 1959 British crime mystery film directed by Jack Cardiff and starting Van Johnson and Vera Miles. It was written by Ken Taylor based on the 1950 novel of the same title by A. J. Cronin.

== Plot ==
The opening credits roll over images of a father playing with his young son in a wood and sailing a toy yacht on a pond. We then jump to Liverpool during the Blitz in the Second World War. A woman (it is implied she is a prostitute) tells a man she is pregnant, then he goes home to see his wife and children. The police arrive at his door and ask what he knows of the murder of the prostitute.

The story jumps to 1959 and the man's son (Paul) is sailing back into Liverpool "to clear things up". He is shocked when a local shopkeeper tells him that Mr Oswald saved his father's life: "that is why he wasn't hanged... for the murder". He knows nothing of any of this.

He heads to the library and starts reading through old newspapers from 1941. Eventually he finds "Liverpool Girl Murdered: Man Questioned". He then finds an article linked "Man Charged". The librarian has to usher him out as the library closes.

When he eventually gets to the core of the story it appears that the police have covered up the truth. But when he goes to see his father in prison at the point of release he is deeply disappointed in his character: he wants whisky and a prostitute as soon as possible. Paul says he is ashamed of him.

But Paul is determined to help him, and the film ends on a hopeful note.

== Cast ==
- Van Johnson as Paul Mathry
- Vera Miles as Lena Anderson
- Emlyn Williams as Enoch Oswald
- Bernard Lee as Patrick Mathry
- Jean Kent as Louise Burt
- Moultrie Kelsall as Chief Inspector Dale
- Leo McKern as McEvoy
- Ralph Truman as Sir Matthew Sprott
- Geoffrey Keen as prison governor
- Jameson Clark as Swann
- Rosalie Crutchley as Ella Mathry
- Oliver Johnston as Prusty
- Joyce Heron as Catherine, Lady Sprott
- Anthony Newlands as Dunn
- Vincent Winter as Paul Mathry (as a child)
- Henry Oscar as Alderman Sharpe
- John Glyn-Jones as magistrate
- Hope Jackman as Mrs. Hanley
- Michael Collins as Detective Sergeant Trevor
- Danny Green as Roach
- Josephine Bell as woman passing by
- Jacky Bell as little boy passing by

== Reception ==
The Monthly Film Bulletin wrote: "Beyond This Place attempts some fairly strong criticisms of the English legal system, and explores the effect of long-term imprisonment upon the individual. But stripped of the particular social and moral climate of Cronin's novel, the film's early promise of a detailed investigation into the shortcomings of legal procedure is unrealised. This failure to establish a specific target, or to take a stand on the many issues raised, is largely due to the rigidly conventional treatment ... Jack Cardiff's direction is rather lifeless, with some ragged location shooting and typically drooping performances by Van Johnson and Vera Miles."

Variety wrote: "This straightforward plot is given a fair amount of bite by Cardiff's direction. Though the ending rather falls apart unconvincingly, Kenneth Taylor's screenplay moves doggedly and interestingly towards the payoff. Wilkie Cooper's lensing heips to capture the Liverpool atmosphere."

In British Sound Films: The Studio Years 1928–1959 David Quinlan rated the film as "average", writing: "Rather lackadaisical sentimental mystery."

The Radio Times Guide to Films gave the film 2/5 stars, writing: "Cameraman-turned-director Jack Cardiff was still finding his feet with this, his second film. It's a rather turgid tale about a grown-up wartime evacuee who returns to England to clear his dad of murder. Anglophile Van Johnson is not an ideal lead, though he furrows his brow nicely, but there's a fine British supporting cast. The budget limitations are obvious, despite the presence of US import Vera Miles and a brief location shoot in Liverpool."
