= The Keys of the Kingdom =

1941 novel by A. J. Cronin

- First US edition
- Author: A. J. Cronin
- Language: English
- Genre: Religious fiction Historical novel
- Publisher: Victor Gollancz Ltd (UK); Little, Brown and Company (US)
- Publication date: 1941
- Publication place: United Kingdom
- Media type: Print (hardback and paperback)
- Pages: 344
- OCLC: 364263

The Keys of the Kingdom is a 1941 novel by A. J. Cronin. Spanning six decades, it tells the story of Father Francis Chisholm, an unconventional Scottish Catholic priest who struggles to establish a mission in China. Beset by tragedy in his youth, as a missionary Chisholm endures many years of hardship, punctuated by famine, plague and war in the Chinese province to which he is assigned. Through a life guided by compassion and tolerance, Chisholm earns the respect of the Chinese—and of fellow clergy who would mistrust him—with his kindly, high-minded and courageous ways.

== Synopsis ==
The novel has six parts, the first (The Beginning of the End) taking place in Scotland in 1938. Father Francis Chisholm is an old man, living with a housekeeper and a young orphan. Due to his unconventional views, he is being investigated by Monsignor Sleeth. The second section (Strange Vocation) focuses on Chisholm's youth. His father is a Catholic and his mother a non-denominational Protestant. After the father is beaten by an anti-Catholic mob, Chisholm's mother tries to lead him home to safety, only for them both to drown after falling off a bridge into a strong current, leaving young Francis an orphan. Initially, his kindly Aunt Polly wishes to adopt him, but his maternal grandmother, Mrs Glennie, intervenes and adopts him, thereby receiving any money in the Chisholm's estate. Francis's maternal grandfather, a baker by trade, is also a preacher of his own branch of Christianity focused on universal tolerance, and plays a large role in the development of Francis's ideologies. While his grandfather is kind, Mrs Glennie and her son Malcolm are resentful and exploitative. Francis is forced to quit school and work in a shipyard.

Things take a turn for the better when Francis befriends Willie Tulloch and his family. Tulloch's father is the local doctor and the family are the town's free-thinkers. Willie aids Francis in his attempt to run away. When the attempt fails, Willie's father contacts Aunt Polly, who takes Francis home to live with her and her daughter, Nora. Francis falls in love with Nora, but is afraid to act on it. Nora later has a child out of wedlock, and, rather than marry a man she doesn't love, commits suicide. This cements Francis's decision to join a seminary with childhood friend Anselm Mealey, where Francis's humanistic views cause problems for him. However, he befriends the seminary director, Bishop Hamish McNabb, who comes to his assistance when Francis is nearly expelled from the seminary for having spent a night at a whore's house.

The third section (An Unsuccessful Curate) focuses on Father Chisholm's first two assignments and his struggles to do what he feels is right in the face of bureaucracy, tradition, and obstinance. At his second appointment, a local girl claims to have come across a previously dry well that had now burst forth anew with healing properties, accompanied by visions of the Blessed Virgin Mary, drawing comparisons to Saint Bernadette. Francis is shunned for doubting the girl's claims but is vindicated when it is discovered that she had lied. Francis's faith is rewarded when he finds a gravely ill boy who is cured by the spring water.

In the fourth section (The China Incident) Father Chisholm takes a position at a mission in Pai-tan, China. When he arrives, the mission is in ruins and no converts are to be found. Much of this section deals with the superficial and detrimental aspects of the mission systems, which focus only on official numbers and not on improving spiritual lives. With supplies from Willie Tulloch (now a doctor himself) Father Chisholm opens a free clinic, gaining the support of the villagers. He saves the life of a wealthy local's son, who gives him land and builds him a new mission. With the aid of an isolated Christian village nearby and three nuns sent to him, he starts a school and the mission flourishes. When a flood hits and destroys the mission, the lead nun, astonished by Chisholm's moral quality, seeks assistance from her brother, a rich German, to rebuild it. Then a plague hits Pai-tan. Willie Tulloch comes to help, and is among the last to perish from the disease. He learns that Nora's daughter Judy died in childbirth, and sends money for the care of her son, Andrew. The mission is caught in a battle between two warlords, and Father Chisholm is forced out of his pacifism. Decades later, the warlord he worked against kidnapped Chisholm, one of his mission workers, and two Methodist missionaries. They manage to escape, but one of the Methodist missionaries is killed. Chisholm soon returns to Scotland (in section five, The Return) and asks Bishop Anselm Mealey for an appointment in his home town, but Bishop Mealey refuses it and assigns Father Chisholm to another town. He finds and adopts Andrew. The story ends with section six (The End of the Beginning), in which Monsignor Sleeth is convinced of Chisholm's ideologies and recommends he not be removed from his position.

== Adaptations ==
The book was made into a 1944 film The Keys of the Kingdom starring Gregory Peck as Father Francis Chisholm and Vincent Price as Anselm "Angus" Mealey. This role earned Peck his first Oscar nomination for Best Actor.

The Keys of the Kingdom was adapted as a radio play on 19 November 1945 episode of Lux Radio Theater featuring Ronald Colman and Ann Harding. It was also adapted on 21 August 1946 episode of Academy Award Theater with Gregory Peck reprising his leading role.
