= The Stars Look Down (film) =

1940 film by Carol Reed

- UK DVD cover
- Directed by: Carol Reed
- Screenplay by: A. J. Cronin; J.B. Williams
- Based on: The Stars Look Down by A. J. Cronin
- Produced by: Isadore Goldsmith; Maurice J. Wilson
- Starring: Michael Redgrave; Margaret Lockwood; Emlyn Williams; Nancy Price
- Narrated by: Lionel Barrymore (US version)
- Cinematography: Mutz Greenbaum; Ernest Palmer
- Edited by: Reginald Beck
- Music by: Hans May
- Production company: Grafton Films
- Distributed by: Metro-Goldwyn-Mayer (US); Grand National Pictures (UK)
- Release date: 22 January 1940 (UK)
- Running time: 110 minutes
- Country: United Kingdom
- Language: English

The Stars Look Down is a British drama film from 1940, based on A. J. Cronin's 1935 novel of the same title, about injustices in a mining town in North East England. The film, co-scripted by Cronin and directed by Carol Reed, stars Michael Redgrave as Davey Fenwick and Margaret Lockwood as Jenny Sunley. The film is a New York Times Critics' Pick and is listed in The New York Times Guide to the Best 1,000 Movies Ever Made.

== Plot ==
Coal miners, led by Robert "Bob" Fenwick, go on strike, refusing to work in a particular section of the mine due to the great danger of flooding, despite their own union supporting Neptune Colliery's owner, Richard Barras. Tensions rise as the strikers go hungry. Finally, some of them break into a butcher's shop and loot it. Bob Fenwick tries to stop it, but ends up being arrested himself. The miners give in and go back to work. Bob's son "Davey" wins a scholarship and moves away to attend university.

While studying, Davey runs into an old friend, Joe Gowlan, now a bookmaker and philanderer. They go to a restaurant together with one of Gowlan's girlfriends, Jenny Sunley, the daughter of Gowlan's landlady. She tries to make Gowlan jealous by pretending to be smitten with Davey, but he is not taken in. He obtains a much better job from Stanley Millington through the influence of Millington's wife Laura. In the process he deserts Jenny who easily courts Davey, getting him to abandon his university career for a teaching job.

Jenny is dissatisfied with her life as a housewife on Davey’s low wages and is profligate. Davey has unconventional modern teaching methods which are not appreciated by his seniors and he is sacked. While tutoring Barras’s son he finds Gowlan making a secret deal with Barras to mine in the dangerous section of the pit. Outraged he tries to persuade the trade union to call a strike, but his motives are questioned after it becomes known that Gowlan has renewed acquaintance with Jenny.

The new contract proceeds and disaster strikes at the mine.

== Cast ==
- Michael Redgrave as David "Davey" Fenwick
- Margaret Lockwood as Jenny Sunley
- Emlyn Williams as Joe Gowlan
- Nancy Price as Martha Fenwick
- Allan Jeayes as Richard Barras
- Edward Rigby as Robert "Bob" Fenwick
- Linden Travers as Mrs. Laura Millington
- Cecil Parker as Stanley Millington
- Milton Rosmer as Harry Nugent, MP
- George Carney as Slogger Gowlan
- Ivor Barnard as Wept
- Olga Lindo as Mrs. Sunley
- Desmond Tester as Hughie Fenwick
- David Markham as Arthur Barras
- Aubrey Mallalieu as Hudspeth
- Kynaston Reeves as Strother
- Clive Baxter as Pat Reedy
- James Harcourt as Will
- Frederick Burtwell as Union Official
- Dorothy Hamilton as Mrs. Reedy
- Frank Atkinson as Miner
- David Horne as Mr. Wilkins
- Edmund Willard as Mr. Ramage
- Ben Williams as Harry Brace
- Scott Harrold as Schoolmaster Strother (as Scott Harold)

== Production ==
A week of filming was undertaken at Great Clifton, and at St Helens Colliery, Siddick, in Cumberland, followed by seven weeks of shooting at Denham and Twickenham Studios in London, where an elaborate pithead was simulated. There is also a shot at Derwent Crossings, looking towards Mossbay pig-iron works in Workington. The railway station used was Workington Central on the Cleator & Workington Junction Railway. Several shots of Middle Row and Back Row in Northside, a village at the northern end of the town of Workington, are also included.

Later the set was moved to Shepperton Studios for another week of shooting. The original set of the pithead was used to make up a huge composite set of 40,000 square yards, then the largest exterior set ever constructed for a British film. The set consisted of a replica of the Workington pit where the location work had been done, including the pithead complete with cage, ramp and outer buildings, and rows of miners' cottages. Pit ponies from the Cumberland mines were used and the miners' costumes consisted of clothes purchased from colliery workers.

The film provided a rare character role for Margaret Lockwood. She was unhappy that her character was unfaithful and asked for it to be changed. Carol Reed disagreed but Maurice Ostrer backed Lockwood. Then Reed got together with Ted Black and they managed to keep the character as originally written.

Indian filmmaker Bibhuti Mitra, then a student of cinematography, served as an assistant to Reed during the film's production.

== Differences between the British and U.S. versions ==
The film was released in the United States a year and a half after the British premiere. The opening and end credits were changed, and were supplemented with a voiceover narration by Lionel Barrymore. In addition, the departing scenes and dialogue at the end between Davey and his mother were cut.

In the original version the opening credits appear against establishing shots of the pithead, and the men emerging from underground and walking down towards the pit owner to begin their strike. The U.S. version uses a plain background for the main title and an explanatory voiceover that lessens the graphic impact of the original.

The U.S. version ends with the camera rising above the pit as the Lord's Prayer is spoken after the disaster, with verses added and a final shot of heavenly clouds and a longer voiceover. The original version has the first line of the Lord's Prayer as the camera rises to the black sky above the pit. It then fades in to the final scenes as Davey's mother is downstairs preparing her son's sandwiches for his return to work at the pit. Davey emerges down the stairs dressed, not in work clothes, but in a suit. He tells his mother that he is going to work for the union. His mother says, "You are all I have left now ..." and gives him an apple for the train journey. He goes to the front door and turns back to his mother, who stands at the hearth. The final shot is an exterior of the cottage with Davey leaving while his mother watches from the window.

== Reception ==
According to Kinematograph Weekly the film did well at the British box office in February 1940.

== See also ==
- E le stelle stanno a guardare
- The Stars Look Down, a TV serial

== Bibliography ==
- Jerry Vermilye, The Great British Films (Citadel Press, 1978) pp 49–51 ISBN 0-8065-0661-X
