= A Pocketful of Rye =

1969 novel by A. J. Cronin

- First US edition
- Author: A. J. Cronin
- Language: English
- Publisher: Little, Brown and Company
- Publication date: 1969 June 1
- Publication place: United Kingdom
- Media type: Print (Hardback)
- Pages: 254 pp.
- ISBN: 0-316-16175-6
- Preceded by: A Song of Sixpence

A Pocketful of Rye is a 1969 novel by A. J. Cronin about a young Scottish doctor, Carroll, and his life in Switzerland. It is a sequel to A Song of Sixpence.

As with several of his other novels, Cronin drew on his own experiences as a doctor for this book. The titles of both novels come from the children's nursery rhyme, Sing a Song of Sixpence.
