= Beyond This Place (novel) =

1950 novel by A. J. Cronin

- First US edition
- Author: A. J. Cronin
- Cover artist: George Salter
- Language: English
- Publisher: Gollancz (UK); Little, Brown (US)
- Publication date: 1950
- Publication place: United Kingdom
- Media type: Print (Hardback & Paperback)
- Pages: 304 pp. (UK hardback edition)
- ISBN: 0-575-00618-8 (UK hardback edition)

Beyond This Place is a novel by Scottish author A. J. Cronin first published in 1950. The first edition for Australia and New Zealand was in 1953. A serial version appeared in Collier's under the title of To Live Again.

== Plot summary ==
Paul Mathry, a student about to graduate and embark upon a teaching career, finds out that his father was convicted for murder, a secret that his mother had hidden from him since his childhood.

Driven by an intense desire to see his father, Paul sets out to visit him in prison, only to find out that visitors are never allowed there.

From there, he meets the primary witnesses in the case that convicted his father, not all of whom are supportive to Paul's cause. He encounters several dead ends but he persists, with the help of a store girl named Lena and a news reporter.

His persistent campaign finally bears fruit. Rees Mathry, Paul's father, goes on appeal and is vindicated. The novel ends with Paul's father, a hardened, cynical man, seeing a fleeting hope for self-renewal and a purposeful life.

== Adaptations ==
The novel has been adapted for both film and television. In Bengali, Sabar Uparey starring Uttam Kumar, Suchitra Sen and Chhabi Biswas was made in 1955. A Bollywood version of this novel, Kala Pani (1958), was directed by Raj Khosla and starred Dev Anand and Madhubala. Suhaag (a 1994 film), directed by Kuku Kohli, starring Ajay Devgn, Akshay Kumar, Karishma Kapoor and Nagma, seemed to be inspired from that novel. The British version film version (1959) was directed by Jack Cardiff and featured Van Johnson and Vera Miles. A television adaptation was broadcast on CBS in 1957, and was produced by David Susskind and directed by Sidney Lumet. It starred Farley Granger, Peggy Ann Garner, Torin Thatcher, Brian Donlevy, and Shelley Winters. A Telugu version, Poola Rangadu (1967), loosely based on the novel, was directed by Adurthi Subba Rao and starred ANR and Jamuna. The 1970 Tamil movie En Annan starring MGR was also based on this movie.
