= Ljiljana Jovanović =

Serbian actress

- Born: 16 February 1930; Kruševac, Kingdom of Yugoslavia
- Died: 27 January 2012 (aged 81); Belgrade, Serbia
- Occupation: Actor
- Years active: 1948–2012

Ljiljana Jovanović (16 February 1930 – 27 January 2012) was a Serbian actress. She appeared in more than sixty films from 1948 to 2012.

== Selected filmography ==
Year	Title	Role	Notes
1984	Balkan Spy		
1977	The Dog Who Loved Trains		
1968	U raskoraku		
1967	The Rats Woke Up		
1965	Man Is Not a Bird		
