= Hans-Peter =

Hans-Peter is a German masculine given name. Notable people with the name include:

- Hans Peter Aglassinger (born 1963), Austrian industrial designer
- Hans Peter Anvin (born 1972), Swedish computer programmer, contributor to Free and open source software projects
- Hans-Peter Bartels (born 1961), German politician of the SPD and member of the Bundestag for Kiel
- Hans-Peter Berger (born 1981), Austrian football goalkeeper
- Hans Peter Boerresen (1825–1901), Danish missionary to India from Gossner mission
- Hans-Peter Briegel (born 1955), German former football player and manager
- Hans Peter Duerr (born 1943), German anthropologist, author of ten books on the subject
- Hans-Peter Dürr (1929–2014), German physicist
- Hans-Peter Durst (born 1958), German para cyclist
- Hans-Peter Feldmann (born 1941), German visual artist
- Hans-Peter Ferner (born 1956), (West) German former middle-distance runner
- Hans Peter Fischnaller (born 1985), Italian luger
- Hans-Peter Friedländer (1920–1999), Swiss football forward
- Hans-Peter Friedrich (born 1957), German politician, representative of the Christian Social Union
- Hans Peter Mareus Neilsen Gammel (1854–1931), author and bookseller
- Hans Peter Geerdes or H.P. Baxxter (born 1964), German entertainer, frontman of the techno group Scooter
- Hans-Peter Gies (born 1947), retired East German shot putter
- Hans Peter Hallwachs (born 1938), German television actor
- Hans Peter Hammel (born 1947), Swiss journalist
- Hans Peter Christian Hansen (1851–1910), New Zealand farmer, hotel-keeper and community leader
- Hans Peter Hansen (1829–1899), Danish xylographer who specialized in portraits
- Hans Peter Hansen (politician) (1872–1953), Danish journalist and politician
- Hans Peter Haselsteiner (born 1944), Austrian industrialist and former politician
- Hans Peter Helander (born 1951), Swedish retired hockey player
- Hans Peter Holm (1772–1812), Danish naval officer
- Hans-Peter Kaul (1943–2014), German judge, international law scholar and former diplomat
- Hanspeter Keiser (1925–2007), Swiss artist known as César Keiser
- Hans Peter Keller (1915–1988), German poet who authored several poem collections
- Hans Peter Kerkeling (born 1964), German actor, presenter and comedian
- Hans-Peter Knaust (1906–1983), highly decorated Oberstleutnant in the Wehrmacht during World War II
- Hans-Peter Koppe (born 1958), German rower who competed for East Germany in the 1980 Summer Olympics
- Hans Peter Kraus (1907–1988), Austrian-born book dealer
- Hans-Peter Kriegel (born 1948), German computer scientist, professor at LMU Munich
- Hans Peter Kürten, mayor of Remagen from 1964 to 1994
- Hans-Peter Lanig (born 1935), German alpine skier
- Hans-Peter Lehnhoff (born 1963), retired German football player
- Hans-Peter Liese or Peter Liese (born 1965), German politician and Member of the European Parliament
- Hans-Peter Lindstrøm (born 1973), Norwegian producer
- Hans Peter Elisa Lødrup (1885–1955), Norwegian journalist, newspaper editor, non-fiction writer and politician for the Conservative Party
- Hans Peter L'Orange (academic) (1903–1983), Norwegian art historian and classical archaeologist
- Hans Peter L'orange (officer) (1835–1907), Norwegian military officer
- Hans Peter Luhn (1896–1964), German-American computer scientist
- Hans-Peter Makan (born 1960), German retired football player
- Hans Peter Manz (born 1955), Austrian diplomat
- Hans-Peter Martin (born 1957), Austrian journalist and politician
- Hans Peter Matthiae, German chef and restaurant owner
- Hans-Peter Mayer (born 1944), German politician and Member of the European Parliament
- Hans Peter Minderhoud (born 1973), Dutch dressage rider
- Hans Petter Moland (born 1955), Norwegian film director
- Hans Peter Murer (1897–1947), Alsatian politician
- Hans-Peter Neuhaus (born 1945), West German former handball player
- Hanspeter Pfister, German-American computer scientist
- Hans-Peter Pohl (born 1965), German former Nordic combined skier
- Hans-Peter Reinecke (1941–2005), German actor
- Hans-Peter Repnik (1947–2025), German politician
- Hans Peter Richter (1925–1993), German author
- Hans-Peter Schaller (born 1962), Austrian football manager
- Hans-Peter Schulze (born 1939), German fencer
- Hans-Peter Seidel, German computer graphics researcher
- Hans Peter Sørensen (1886–1962), Lord Mayor of Copenhagen
- Hans-Peter Steinacher (born 1968), Austrian sailor and Olympic champion
- Hans-Peter Stenzl (born 1960), German classical pianist and music educator
- Hans Peter Jørgen Julius Thomsen (1826–1909), Danish chemist
- Hans-Peter Tschudi (1913–2002), Swiss politician and member of the Swiss Federal Council (1959–1973)
- Hans-Peter Uhl (born 1944), German politician
- Hans-Peter Vietze (1939–2008), German Mongolist
- Hans-Peter Wild (born 1941), German entrepreneur and lawyer
- Hans-Peter Zaugg, (born 1952), Swiss former footballer, current manager of the Liechtenstein national football team
- Hans-Peter Zimmer (1936–1992), German painter and sculptor
- Hans-Peter Zwicker (born 1960), retired football striker

== See also ==
- MV Hans Peter (1933), a West German cargo ship in service 1956–70
- Hans Peters
- Hans Peterson
