= Minu =

Minu may refer to:

- Minu Island, Khuzestan province, southwestern Iran
- Minu District, an administrative subdivision of Iran
- Minu, Lorestan, a village in Lorestan Province, Iran
- Min-woo, Korean given name also transcribed as "Minu"
- -minu (born 1947), pen name of Swiss newspaper columnist Hans-Peter Hammel
- Minal "Minu" Panchal, one of the victims of the Virginia Tech Massacre
- Minu, a Genie Fairy in Shimmer and Shine
- Minod Moktan, human rights activist
