= Mary Miller (actress) =

English actress (1929–2020)

- Born: Mary Elizabeth Spinks; 27 December 1929; Gorleston-on-Sea, Norfolk, England
- Died: 11 July 2020 (aged 90); Northwood, London, England
- Occupation: Actress
- Years active: 1959–2005
- Spouse: Bill Simpson (m. 1965; div. 1969)

Mary Elizabeth Miller (née Spinks; 27 December 1929 – 11 July 2020) was an English television and stage actress, who was a founding member of the National Theatre Company in 1963.

== Career ==
=== Early years ===
Mary Miller first appeared on television in 1959 as Alice Chandler in episode one of the 6-part series The Golden Spur, with Ronald Fraser and Oliver Reed. In the same year, she took the role of Ann Elsden in "The Talking Doll", the first instalment of the UK TV police drama, No Hiding Place.

In 1961, the playwright and novelist Peter Wildeblood was commissioned by Granada Television to produce an 11-part series featuring "up-and-coming acting talent, in plays by young authors, each actor or actress taking the lead role in turn". It was called The Younger Generation, and Miller appeared in eight of the plays. In 1963, Miller became one of the 77 performers to be founding members of the National Theatre Company in its inaugural season under artistic director Sir Laurence Olivier.

The Protectors was a British television series, made by ABC (and not to be confused with the later British series from the 1970s, which began a run of 14 episodes in March 1964. It starred Andrew Faulds and Michael Atkinson as an ex-insurance investigator and ex-policeman who start up their own security firm to tackle crime. Miller appeared in May during the eighth instalment called "Freedom!", as Tamara.

When the BBC made a series, The Indian Tales of Rudyard Kipling, set in the days of the British Raj and based partly on his book which had originally been "[a] set of Indian tales that first appeared in Macmillan's Magazine", Miller portrayed Mrs. Denville in episode 23, "A Second-Rate Woman", in 1964. She then played a comedy role in the BBC's The Dick Emery Show on 4 December 1964.

In 1965, she played Diana Gibbs in "Other People's Lives", an instalment of the popular BBC Television police drama Dixon of Dock Green, which starred Jack Warner as Sergeant George Dixon. Later that year, she appeared in the BBC serial drama called Mogul (subsequently renamed The Troubleshooters), set in the oil industry. She played Lizzie, in a storyline called "Tosh and Nora".

That same year, 1965, she made her first appearance with Casey Hodgkiss, her best friend, and they starred together in the performance of The Night Thoreau Spent in Jail. Also in 1965, she appeared in Dr. Finlay's Casebook, alongside her soon-to-be husband Bill Simpson. She played Molly Spalding in "Beware of the Dog", episode 20 in season 3 of the BBC series about a doctors' surgery in Scotland.

=== The later 1960s ===
After four appearances in 1966 (in the anthology-style programmes Mystery and Imagination and The Wednesday Play, in Thirteen Against Fate, and for a second time in No Hiding Place. she was given the role of Maggie Hobson in a 3 part BBC production of Hobson's Choice, the play by Harold Brighouse set in Salford in the late 19th century".

Turning her hand once more to comedy, she appeared with Marty Feldman in his madcap series Marty (1968–69). She also made appearances in "The Photographer", part of Kenneth Jupp's Chelsea Trilogy; The Mock Doctor, a Rediffusion production based on a comedy by Molière; and another Wednesday Play, called "Mrs. Lawrence Will Look After It", as Freda Wills. 1968 also saw her second appearance in Dr. Finlay's Casebook, this time playing Sister Brown in the episode "A Moral Problem".

In 1969, she played Anna in Barrister at Law, a legal drama play from the BBC. She would make two more series with Feldman – Marty Amok in 1970, and Marty Abroad in 1971.

In 1969 she co-starred with Patrick Macnee in the William Douglas-Home comedy, The Secretary Bird, at the Palace Theatre, Castlereagh Street, Sydney. It was presented by Harry M Miller Attractions. Other cast members were Jan Kingsbury, Fredric Abbott, and Betty Dyson. It was directed by Philip Dudley.

In the next few years she appeared in such productions as Tales of Piccadilly, ITV Playhouse, Sykes, Space: 1999, and Old Times, the Harold Pinter play.

=== Crown Court ===
She was chosen to portray the strong female personality that was Angela Dunwoody QC, in Crown Court, the courtroom drama series made by various ITV network television companies between 1972 and 1984. Miller took up the role in 1976, and played the barrister until 1977, in four storylines over ten episodes beginning with "Accepted Standards" in 1976, which featured a cast including Ben Kingsley, Patricia Routledge and Liz Smith, and involved a GP who is accused of libel against a PVC factory over their claims regarding safe practice. In "Those in Peril", a trawler boat captain is accused of negligence when a deckhand is swept overboard and killed. Two men are charged with conspiring to smuggle arms to Lebanon in "Death for Sale", the last of her 1976 Crown Court appearances. Her final appearance in the series, called "A Matter of Faith" and broadcast in February 1977, told the story of a man, charged with libel against a spiritual healer, whose wife had committed suicide after a session with the healer failed to cure her paralysis.

=== The late 1970s ===
Miller did not restrict herself to just the medium of television. She continued to perform in the theatre, appearing as Beth (with Alan Bates and Nigel Hawthorne) in Simon Gray's Otherwise Engaged at the Queen's Theatre in London on 30 July 1975 under the direction of Harold Pinter, and repeated this performance in New York City in 1977.

Also in 1977, Miller appeared as Denise Collins in the BBC television mini-series, Fathers and Families, and then played Fay Passmore in eleven instalments of the Thames Television production Rooms, a long-running series charting the lives of tenants in a block of bed-sits. And in 1978, appearing in an episode of Scottish Television's The Prime of Miss Jean Brodie (the title role being played by Geraldine McEwan), she took the part of Irene Cibelli.

All Quiet on the Western Front (1979) is a TV film about the First World War from the perspective of the German troops. Filmed in Czechoslovakia, it starred Richard Thomas and Ernest Borgnine, and was adapted from the novel Im Westen nichts Neues by Erich Maria Remarque. Miller played Frau Kemmerich.

According to Jacqueline Pearce, the actress who played Servalan in the BBC sci-fi TV series Blake's 7 (1978–81), Miller turned down the role when offered it, and Pearce was cast.

=== The 1980s ===
Miller returned to London's Covent Garden in April 1981 to fulfil one half of a Royal Ballet production portraying the legendary artistic dancer Isadora Duncan in Kenneth MacMillan's ballet Isadora. She provided the voice of the subject, reading from Duncan's memoirs, along with Merle Park who danced the moves. She transferred to the United States with the production in July of that year, when Sandra Conley shared the dance interpretation with Park.

Miller continued with her stage career, appearing in such productions as the 1983 run of the play Pack of Lies at the Lyric Theatre in London in October 1983, alongside Frank Windsor.

She was part of a strong cast list assembled by Anglia Television in 1985 for the making of the fantasy puppet/live action feature Alice in Wonderland, based on the famous novel by Lewis Carroll. She provided the voices for the Mouse, Duck, Parrot, Longbeaked Bird, Pigeon, Cook and Baby.

In the 1987 Screen Two production "After Pilkington", the Prix Italia winner written by Simon Gray and starring Miranda Richardson, Miller played Deirdre Pilkington, the wife of a missing archaeologist. After appearing in two episodes of Fay Weldon's The Heart of the Country for BBC Pebble Mill in the same year, she became a regular member of the cast of the Anglia Television fantasy role-playing game format called Knightmare, usually playing the parts of Lilith or Mildread, in a total of 27 shows and finishing in 1988 (although the programme itself continued until 1994).

=== Later years ===
In 1990, Miller appeared for two episodes in the popular BBC soap opera EastEnders, as Frank Butcher's older sister, Joan Garwood, who turns up in Walford at Frank's request when their mother Mo develops Alzheimer's disease, and it is then decided that Mo should go and live with Joan and her husband in Colchester, Essex. The character would re-appear in the programme for one more episode in 1995, still being played by Miller.

Before that return, she went on to take parts in The Inspector Alleyn Mysteries (1993), Casualty (1993), and Cadfael (1995). Then, in 1997, she appeared in two instalments of the Yorkshire Television drama series Trial & Retribution, playing Mrs. Gillingham.

Her last recorded work was in the 2005 "updating" of Trial & Retribution by Lynda La Plante, in which Miller played a different character, Felicity Harper, in added on episodes.

== Personal life ==
Miller married the Scottish actor Bill Simpson (Dr. Finlay's Casebook) on 24 July 1965 at Callander near Menteith, Scotland. The couple had no children, and divorced in March 1969.

Miller spent the last eleven years of her life as a resident of Denville Hall, the actors’ retirement and nursing home in Northwood, Hillingdon, where she died on 11 July 2020, at the age of 90.

== Filmography ==
=== Television ===
Year	Title	Role	Notes
1959	The Golden Spur	Alice Chandler	2 episodes
1961	The Younger Generation	Various	8 episodes
1962	ITV Play of the Week	Ruth Hanwell	Episode: "The Casualties"
1962	Harpers West One	Carol Gaskell	Episode: #2.8
1963	Armchair Theatre	Joan Culver	Episode: "The Hot Potato Boys"
1963	24-Hour Call	Claire Hammond	Episode: "The Trunker"
1964	The Protectors	Tamara Petrovna	Episode: "Freedom!"
1964	The Indian Tales of Rudyard Kipling	Mrs. Denville	Episode: "A Second-Rate Woman"
1965	Dixon of Dock Green	Diana Gibbs	Episode: "Other People's Lives"
1965	Front Page Story	Jessie Langdon	Episode: "Official Opening"
1965	The Troubleshooters	Lizzie	Episode: "Tosh and Nora"
1966	Theatre 625	Beatie Bryant	Episode: "The Wesker Trilogy, Part 2: Roots"
1966	Mystery and Imagination	Lucy	Episode: "The Fall of the House of Usher"
1959–1966	No Hiding Place	Ann Elsden Anne Harrington	2 episodes
1966	Thirteen Against Fate	Alice	Episode: "The Suspect"
1967	Jackanory	Storyteller	5 episodes
1967	Hobson's Choice	Maggie Hobson	3 episodes
1967	Thirty-Minute Theatre	Lady Torrance	Episode: "Come Death"
1965–1968	Dr. Finlay's Casebook	Molly Spalding Sister Brown	2 episodes
1968	The Mock Doctor	Martine	2 episodes
1966–1968	The Wednesday Play	Freda Wills Vera	2 episodes
1968–1969	Marty	Various	8 episodes
1969	Barrister at Law	Anna	Television film
1970	Marty Amok	Various	Television film
1971	Marty Abroad		Television film
1971	ITV Sunday Night Theatre	Jean	Episode: "A Windmill in the Windows"
1972	The Befrienders	Anne Griffith	Episode: "Odds Against"
1972	Sykes	Miss Jones	Episode: "Stranger"
1968–1972	ITV Playhouse	Various	4 episodes
1973	The Gordon Peters Show	Regular	Episode: "The Prize"
1973	Away from It All	Lou	Episode: "The Quiet Half Hour"
1973	Late Night Theatre	Hannah	Episode: "The Old Days"
1973	Thinking Man As Hero	Jenny Duncan	Television film
1974	Sister's Day	Jean Slater	Television film
1974	Sing the Lady Out of Bed		Television film
1975	Nightingale's Boys	Sheila Taylor	Episode: "Big Sid"
1975	Space: 1999	Freda	Episode: "Death's Other Dominion"
1975	Shades of Greene	Trevor's Mother	Episode: "The Destructors"
1975	Old Times	Anna	Television film
1976	Couples	Mrs. Partridge	3 episodes
1976–1977	Crown Court	Angela Dunwoody QC	10 episodes
1977	Fathers and Families	Denise Collins	Episode: "Family Party"
1977	Rooms	Fay Passmsore	12 episodes
1978	The Prime of Miss Jean Brodie	Irene Cibelli	Episode: "Giulia"
1979	All Quiet on the Western Front	Mrs. Kemmerich	Television film
1984	Missing from Home	Mrs. Annan	Episode: #1.3
1985	Alice in Wonderland	Various	4 episodes
1987	Screen Two	Deirdre Pilkington	Episode: "After Pilkington"
1987	Heart of the Country	Sally Rains	3 episodes
1987–1988	Knightmare	Lillith Mildread	25 episodes
1990	Making Out	Events Organiser	Episode: #2.8
1990	EastEnders	Joan Garwood	4 episodes
1993	The Inspector Alleyn Mysteries	Mrs. Freeman	Episode: "Death at the Bar"
1993	Casualty	Hilary Kingston	3 episodes
1994	Cadfael	Richildis	Episode: "Monk's Hood"
1997–2005	Trial & Retribution	Felicity Harper Mrs. Gillingham	3 episodes
