= Bram van der Vlugt =

Dutch actor (1934–2020)

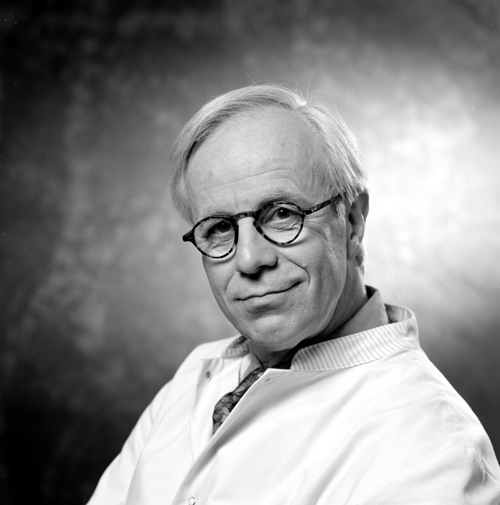
- Bram van der Vlugt (1991)
- Born: Abraham Rutger van der Vlugt; 28 May 1934; The Hague, Netherlands
- Died: 19 December 2020 (aged 86); Nieuwegein, Netherlands

Bram van der Vlugt (28 May 1934 – 19 December 2020) was a Dutch actor. He is known for playing the role of Sinterklaas for over two decades. He died on 19 December 2020, at the age of 86, after contracting COVID-19 during the COVID-19 pandemic in the Netherlands.

== Career ==
=== Sinterklaas ===
He is known for playing the role of Sinterklaas between 1986 and 2010, most notably the annual arrival of Sinterklaas in the Netherlands as well as in the television series De Club van Sinterklaas. He also made many appearances as Sinterklaas in many other television shows, such as Goede tijden, slechte tijden (2006), Life & Cooking (2004 and 2006), De Wereld Draait Door (2008 and 2010), MaDiWoDoVrijdagShow (2010) and Sint & De Leeuw (2005 – 2011, 2018). As of 2011, Stefan de Walle is his successor to play the role of Sinterklaas. Van der Vlugt did appear as Sinterklaas on several occasions after that, most notably in the 2019 film De Brief voor Sinterklaas and the 2020 film De Grote Sinterklaasfilm, which premiered two months before his death. The film became the tenth highest-grossing Dutch film of 2020. Both films were directed by Lucio Messercola. In the 2021 film De Grote Sinterklaasfilm: Trammelant in Spanje, also directed by Messercola, the role of Sinterklaas is played by Robert ten Brink.

=== Television ===
Between 1963 and 1965 he played the role of Dr. Finlay in Memorandum van een dokter.

Between 2005 and 2008 he played the role of attorney Marius de Boer in the television series Keyzer & De Boer Advocaten. Between 2013 and 2014 he played the role of Onno Kremer in the television series Moordvrouw.

== Personal life ==
Van der Vlugt was born in The Hague, Netherlands, the son of Ellen (Stokvis) and Abraham Rutger van der Vlugt. His mother was Jewish, and was killed in the Holocaust.

Van der Vlugt was the father of musician and former model Marijne van der Vlugt.

== Filmography ==
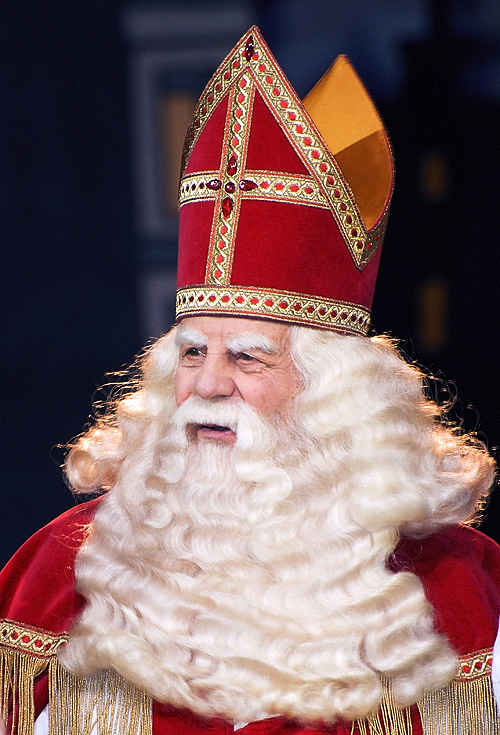
Bram van der Vlugt as Sinterklaas in 2007.

=== Film ===
- 1976: Alle dagen feest – Chef–redacteur
- 1978: Pastorale 1943 – van Dale
- 1981: Het verboden bacchanaal – Frits van der Laan
- 1982: A Question of Silence – Psychiater
- 1982: De smaak van water – Hospital Director
- 1982: Knokken voor twee – Vader Saskia en Joris
- 1985: Tracks in the Snow – Hein van Oyen
- 1992: Flodders in America – Nederlandse ambassadeur
- 1995: Filmpje! – Dokter Lozig
- 1997: Tropic of Emerald – Herman
- 2001: Family – Jan
- 2002: Peter Bell – Sinterklaas
- 2003: Young Kees – Heer 1 Schoolprijs
- 2009: Anubis en de wraak van Arghus – Manus
- 2011: Bennie Stout – Sinterklaas
- 2014: Secret of War – Viccar
- 2014: Gift from the Heart – Niek sr.
- 2017: Het Verlangen – Alfred Goudemondt
- 2019: De Brief voor Sinterklaas – Sinterklaas
- 2020: Rundfunk: Jachterwachter – Nestor
- 2020: De Grote Sinterklaasfilm – Sint Nicolaas

=== Television ===
- 1963–1965: Memorandum van een dokter – Dokter Alan Finlay
- 1975: Klaverweide – van Amerongen
- 1979: Pommetje Horlepiep – Langpoot
- 1983–1984: Herenstraat 10 – Gerard van Laar
- 1991–1994: Medisch Centrum West – Victor Brouwer
- 1996–1999: Unit 13 - Winfried Bilderdijk
- 1999–2009: De Club van Sinterklaas – Sinterklaas
- 2005–2008: Keyzer & De Boer Advocaten – Atty. Marius de Boer
- 2013–2014: Moordvrouw – Onno Kremer
- 2015: Rundfunk – Bernard
- 2016–2018: Dokter Deen – Bart Vos
