= Hanspeter =

Given name

Hanspeter is a given name. Notable people with the name include:

- Hanspeter Bellingrodt (born 1943), Colombian former sports shooter
- Hanspeter Bennwitz (born 1930), German musicologist
- Hanspeter Hasler (born 1953), Swiss retired slalom canoeist
- Hanspeter Keiser (1925–2007), Swiss cabarettist, comedian, radio personality, actor
- Hanspeter Knobel (born 1963), Swiss biathlete
- Hanspeter Kriesi (born 1949), professor of political science at the European University Institute in Florence
- Hanspeter Kyburz (born 1960), contemporary Swiss composer of classical music
- Hanspeter Lanig (1935–2022), German alpine Olympic skier
- Hanspeter Latour (born 1947), Swiss football manager and former goalkeeper
- Hanspeter Lüthi (born 1944), Swiss rower
- Hanspeter Lutz (born 1954), Swiss handball player
- Hanspeter Pfister (born 1964), Swiss computer scientist
- Hanspeter Schild (born 1950), Swiss former footballer
- Hanspeter Seiler (born 1933), Swiss politician and President of the National Council
- Hanspeter Stocker (born 1936), Swiss footballer
- Hanspeter Vogt (born 1927), Swiss speed skater
- Hanspeter Würmli (born 1953), Swiss former freestyle swimmer
- Hanspeter Zaugg (born 1952), Swiss football manager and former player
- Hanspeter Ziörjen (born 1958), Swiss sports shooter

== See also ==
- Hanns Peters
- Hans-Peter
- Hans Peters
