= VriendenLoterij Miljonairs =

Dutch television game show

- Genre: Game show
- Created by: David Briggs; Steven Knight; Mike Whitehill
- Presented by: Robert ten Brink (1999-2008, 2019-2025); Jeroen van der Boom (2011)
- Country of origin: Netherlands
- Original language: Dutch
- No. of seasons: 22
- No. of episodes: 512

Production
- Running time: 60 minutes
- Production companies: Endemol (1999-2008); Mas Media and Tuvalu Media (2011); Vincent TV Producties (2019-2025)

Original release
- Network: SBS6 (February 6, 1999 - February 18, 2006; March 12, 2011 - October 15, 2011); RTL 4 (March 4, 2006 - May 24, 2008; May 25, 2019-March 15, 2025)
- Release: February 6, 1999 – May 24, 2008
- Release: March 12 – October 15, 2011
- Release: May 25, 2019 – March 15, 2025

Titles of Lotto Weekend Miljonairs (2006–2008)

Logo of Lotto Weekend Miljonairs (2000–2006)

Titles of Lotto Weekend Miljonairs (2000–2006)

VriendenLoterij Miljonairs (May 25, 2019 - March 6, 2021 - BankGiro Miljonairs, December 31, 1999 - October 15, 2011 - Lotto Weekend Miljonairs, until December 24, 1999 - Weekend Miljonairs) is a Dutch game show based on the original British format of Who Wants to Be a Millionaire?. The show is hosted by Robert ten Brink. In 2011 the show was hosted by Jeroen van der Boom. It was first shown on 6 February 1999 on SBS6, and in March 2006 it moved to RTL 4. In 2011 it returned on SBS 6.

== Airing history ==
=== As (Lotto) Weekend Miljonairs (1999–2008; 2011) ===
Sponsorship deal with Lotto

From the onset, Dutch lottery Lotto was the main sponsor of the programme. However, in the first seasons (from about 1999 to 2001) the show was simply known as Weekend Miljonairs. The title was changed later to Lotto Weekend Miljonairs. The sponsorship deal with Lotto meant that the weekly Lotto drawing was aired during the programme. Lotto balls were also prominently featured in the programme's opening sequences and studio decoration during this period. Apart the sponsor's name being included in the show's title and logo, the money tree and ending-credit graphics, the ask-the-audience results graphic, the cheques and the fastest finger first, monitors also featured elements of Lotto's corporate design such as the Lotto logo, lotto balls or yellow backgrounds.

1999–2008: Original Format with Robert ten Brink (SBS6, then RTL 4)

The show premiered on 6 February 1999 on SBS6 and was presented by Robert ten Brink. In February 2006, it was announced that the programme would move from SBS6 to RTL 4 the following month. It became known that Lotto wanted its weekly drawing in a more prominent position during the show, something SBS6 was not willing to agree to. Host Robert ten Brink canceled his contract with SBS6 and signed on with RTL shortly after the announcement.

2008: Forced discontinuation

On 2 November 2007, Lotto announced that it would stop sponsoring the show in mid-2008 and would not renew the contract. RTL did not want to give up the program, so they searched hard for a new sponsor but eventually failed. The last episode aired on RTL 4 was May 24, 2008. For some time it seemed the programme would still return after the summer of 2008 but on 26 June 26, 2008, RTL made the announcement that the programme would not return.

Robert ten Brink would become the host of Het Moment Van De Waarheid, the Dutch version of The Moment of Truth.

2011: Clock Format with Jeroen van der Boom (SBS 6)

In 2011, Lotto wanted to record a new season of Lotto Weekend Miljonairs but without Robert ten Brink. The problem was that RTL only wanted to make the new season with Robert. For that reason the programme returned to SBS6 on 12 March 2011 with a new host but again sponsored by Lotto. The last episode was broadcast on 15 October 2011.

=== As BankGiro Miljonairs (2019–2021) ===
2019–2025: Return of the Original Format and Robert ten Brink (RTL 4)

On 5 February 2019, it was announced that the programme would be revived on RTL 4 under the name BankGiro Miljonairs. Robert ten Brink returned as presenter. The first episode of the new season aired on 25 May 2019. This version is no longer sponsored by Lotto, but rather by the BankGiro Loterij. As a result, the weekly Lotto draw will no longer be part of the programme. Instead, a prize-awarding ceremony by the BankGiro Loterij can be seen during the show. The audience completely consists of ticket holders of the Bankgiro Loterij who have to answer ten questions before the show. The eight audience members with the best results (most correct answers in shortest time) qualify for the Fastest Finger round which decides who will play for the million in the Hot Seat.

=== As VriendenLoterij Miljonairs (2021–2025) ===
As of August 16, 2021, the BankGiro Loterij was merged with the VriendenLoterij, which is why the quiz was called VriendenLoterij Miljonairs starting on August 28, 2021. Two seasons are broadcast annually, one in the spring (February, March and April) and one in the fall (October, November and December). In addition, from September 4, 2021 onward, the VriendenLoterij Miljonairs joined with the VriendenLoterij Bingo game. The first 15 Bingo numbers are drawn during the program and, in addition to the candidates, the Bingo players can also win the amounts from the money ladder. They can therefore also have a chance to win 1 million euros.

In October 2025, VriendenLoterij announced it would cancel the program airing on RTL, because it terminated the partnership.

== Rules ==
=== Original rules ===
==== Main game ====
The main goal of the game is to win €1 Million by answering 15 multiple-choice questions correctly. When a contestant gets the fifth question correct, they will leave with at least €500. When a contestant gets the tenth question correct, they will leave with at least €16,000.

==== Lifeline ====
There are three lifelines: Ask the Audience, Switch the Question, and Double Dip.

== Winners ==
The first contestant on the show, Ad van der Kemp, from Dongen, won ƒ16,000.

The program has produced two top prize winners: Hans Peters on 6 January 2001 (who won ƒ1,000,000) and Henny on 29 August 2020 (who won €1,000,000).

The only other contestant in the program so far who has faced the final (15th/12th) question without walking away was Menno de Ruijter on December 20, 2003, who lost €234,000 of the €250,000 he had.

There have also been a few €0 winners: Sander Swiers on April 24, 2004 (missed his 3rd question out of 15), Peter Lintermans on October 1, 2005 (missed his 5th question out of 15), Rob Wennekedonck on October 7, 2006, Peter Lindhout on March 17, 2007 (both missed their 4th question out of 15), an anonymous female contestant in April 2011 (missed her 2nd question out of 12), Rick on February 12, 2022 (missed his 4th question out of 15), Mark on October 29, 2022 (missed his 5th question out of 15) and René on March 9, 2024 (missed his 5th question out of 15).

There have been a few contestants who have walked away on the final (15th/12th) question: Ada Peters with ƒ500,000 on February 12, 2000, Peter Hagendoorn with ƒ500,000 on March 31, 2001, Joost Zwart with €250,000 on March 29, 2003, Ton Wiggenraad with €250,000 on January 10, 2004, Jacqueline Hooiveld with €250,000 on June 3, 2006, and Richard de Bree with €500,000 on July 2, 2011.

== Money Trees ==
| Question number | Question value | | | |
| Question number | 1999–2001 | 2002–2008 | 2011 | 2019–2025 |
|---|---|---|---|---|
| 1 | ƒ50 (€22) | €25 | €500 | €50 |
| 2 | ƒ100 (€45) | €50 | €1,000 | €100 |
| 3 | ƒ250 (€113) | €125 | €2,000 | €150 |
| 4 | ƒ500 (€226) | €250 | €4,000 | €250 |
| 5 | ƒ1,000 (€453) | €500 | €8,000 | €500 |
| 6 | ƒ2,000 (€907) | €1,000 | €16,000 | €1,000 |
| 7 | ƒ4,000 (€1,815) | €2,000 | €25,000 | €2,000 |
| 8 | ƒ8,000 (€3,630) | €4,000 | €50,000 | €4,000 |
| 9 | ƒ16,000 (€7,260) | €8,000 | €100,000 | €8,000 |
| 10 | ƒ32,000 (€14,520) | €16,000 | €250,000 | €16,000 |
| 11 | ƒ64,000 (€29,041) | €32,000 | €500,000 | €32,000 |
| 12 | ƒ125,000 (€56,722) | €64,000 | €1,000,000 | €64,000 |
| 13 | ƒ250,000 (€113,445) | €125,000 | N/A | €125,000 |
| 14 | ƒ500,000 (€226,890) | €250,000 | N/A | €250,000 |
| 15 | ƒ1,000,000 (€453,780) | €1,000,000 | N/A | €1,000,000 |
