= Pat Mullen =

Irish actor and writer

- Born: Patrick Mullen; 17 April 1883; Inishmore, County Galway, Ireland
- Died: 16 December 1972 (aged 89); Carnarvonshire, Wales
- Occupations: Actor, author

Pat Mullen (17 April 1883 – 16 December 1972) was an Irish actor and writer, born in Inishmore, County Galway where before emigrating to Boston, Massachusetts in 1900. He married his first wife Bridget McDonagh in 1913 before returning home to Inishmore with his son Patrick in 1921. Mullen played the part of Shark Hunter in Robert J. Flaherty's Man of Aran (1934) a fictional documentary on life in the Aran Islands. He married his second wife Florence Hall in 1949 before moving to Anglesey, Wales where he died in 1972.

== Early life ==
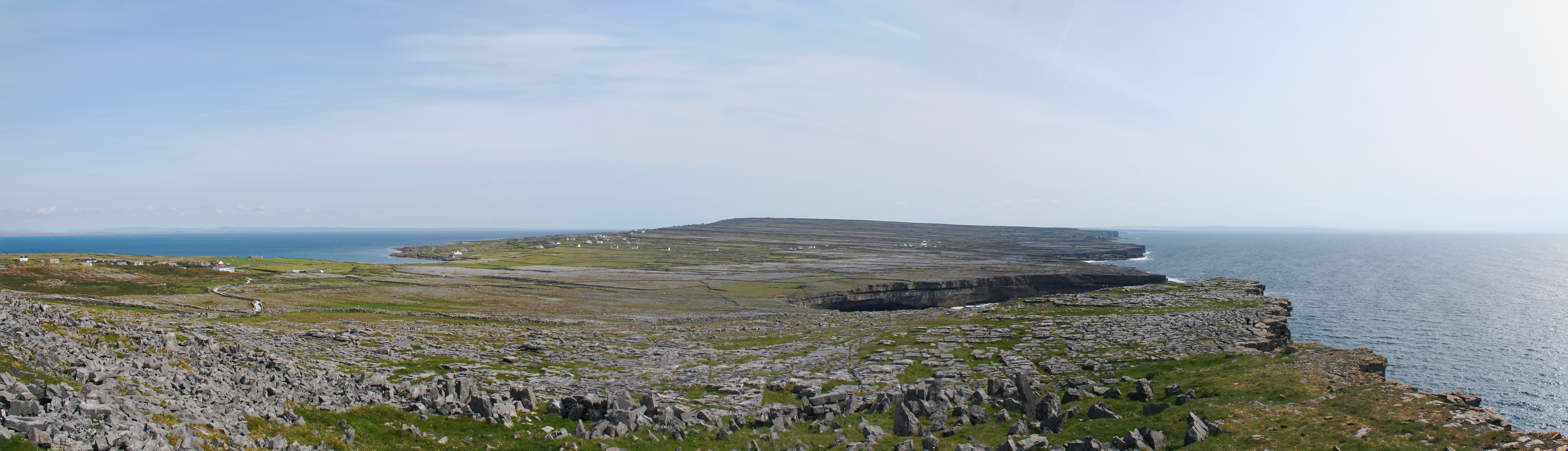
Inishmore, County Galway

Patrick C Mullen was born in Inishmore of the Aran Islands, County Galway to John Mullen and Mary Costello.

He grew up in a relatively large family (household size of 12 compared with the regional average of 5.09). He had nine siblings: John, Mary Cecelia (Cissie), Martin, Peter, Joseph, Winnie, Bartly, Michael and Thomas. Mullen attended Kilronan national school on Inishmor until he was fifteen, and worked for his father on the family farm before labouring on the ice boats in Killarney Harbour for two years.

Due to the Great Famine of 1845, depletion of farmland, industrial underdevelopment and the collapse of the linen industry along with numerous other factors: the inheritance system among landowners in Ireland (particularly in the West of Ireland) changed from the partible inheritance system to the impartible inheritance system. Land was no longer divided among heirs but instead was appointed to the eldest male. As Patrick was the second eldest male (preceded by John, three years his senior) his options included: remaining in Inishmore with little chance of land ownership, moving to Dublin or another large city in search of employment, or emigrating. Mullen emigrated in 1905 at the age of 21.

== Family life ==
In Boston he met Bridget McDonough (1892–1948) also a Galway native, and married her on 12 October 1913 in Boston, Suffolk, Massachusetts, she was a widow. Bridget was the fourth child of Martin McDonagh and Barbara O'Toole. Bridget was previously married and had four children: Mary Kate, Anna, Denis and Francis Michael with her husband Patrick Crowe also from Galway. The pair lived in Eyre Street in Galway where they had their first child Mary Kate and lived with and a boarder who was a widowed army pensioner. They emigrated to Boston in 1904. Patrick Crowe died suddenly on 29 April 1913, and was buried in St. Joseph Cemetery.

They lived in Boston Ward 9 where they kept a boarding house, run by Bridget. They had four children together, Barbara, John, Joseph and Winifred, yet only three of their children survived past infancy, with John living only a week after his birth. The couple lived with their remaining children in Boston and then in Manhattan, until Pat's two brothers Thomas and Bartly fell ill in 1921, compelling him to return to the family home. The brothers died the same year. His daughter Barbara however joined him in Ireland (around 15 years later).

== Career ==
Having emigrated to Boston in 1905, Mullen began working in factories and warehouses, during the winter months and spent summers on rural contract-labour teams. Having successfully led a strike in a Boston wool-house, he earned a charter from the American Federation of Labour and became a founder of a union of city-wide wool-house workers in 1916. Following this, he met a fellow emigrant James Larkin, who was an Irish labour leader, having joined the James Connolly Socialist Club. Mullen's trade-union activism lead him to be sacked from several jobs and blacklisted by employers in Boston, turning him to engage in illegal liquor trafficking. Mullen then returned home in 1921 to the Aran Islands. His circumstances improved slightly when he attained a horse and sidecar, in which he carried out hauling jobs on the island, and also to drive visitors around the Island to view the scenery.

In November 1931, Robert J. Flaherty, an American documentary film maker, along with his family, visited the island and contracted Mullen to drive them around Aran. They formed a connection, and when Flaherty returned to the Island the following year, he employed Mullen as his local-contact man and also assistant director for his film, Man of Aran. He recruited cast members from the island's population and also coached them into carrying out scenes for the film, which were at times dangerous, as they were filmed on the edges of cliffs and also in tough sea conditions. Mullen starred in the film as a basking shark hunter. He spent nine weeks in London recording sound dialogue in the Gaumont-British studios along with his fellow cast members. Following the success of the film, Mullen wrote a book with the same title Man of Aran (October 1934), which included accounts of the making of the film, along with other parts of his life.

== Later life and death ==
He moved to Bull Bay, Anglesey in Wales in 1952 after making friendships with different visitors on Inishmore island, who had sent him correspondence and books. Mullen wrote two books documenting his life in the west of Ireland after the Irish premiere of Man of Aran in May 1934. One book was Hero Breed (1937) and the other was Come Another Day which was published by Faber and Faber in 1940. His autobiography in 1940 gives a more detailed insight into his life in America and his return to Aran.

Mullen married his second wife, Florence Hall, in Kilronan, Inishmore on 18 August 1949. Florence Hall was a school teacher in Heather Bank, Bullbay, Anglesey, Wales. She had visited the island of Aran for 24 years after marrying her husband. The death of Mullen's siblings Mary Mullen in Los Angeles, California in 1955 and Joseph Mullen in Suffolk, Massachusetts in 1966, died only a few years after he moved to Wales. The deaths of his siblings may have brought him back to Inishmore, as he returned regularly to enjoy the summers there.

Mullen's eldest child Barbara Mullen (1914–1979), starred as Janet MacPherson, the stubborn Scottish housekeeper, in the BBC television series 'Dr Finlay's Casebook' in 1964. She was interviewed by Eamonn Andrews on the programme 'This is Your Life' where Patrick Mullen appeared as a guest at 81 years old and her brother P.J. Mullen also made an appearance to look back on Barbara Mullen's life. Mullen is also seen dancing with his daughter during the show.

He was the last of his ten siblings to die in Carnarvonshire, Wales on 16 September 1972. Mullen's ashes were spread on Inishmore in Killeany Cemetery, but people have claimed that his first cremation burial was on the island in Christian times.

== Legacy ==
Mullen's legacy can be seen through his role in the film Man of Aran and in his subsequent book, also entitled Man of Aran (1934), which can be described as a detailed account of the making of the film, also sketches his earlier life in the Aran Islands and the United States. Mullen wrote and published three more novels: a novel of Aran life, Hero breed (1936) part factual record, part fantastical story telling; a Folklore collection, Irish tales (1938), and the autobiographical Come another day (1940).

His books detailing the beauty of Aran is said to have contributed to bringing much more tourism to the island that once saw little to no tourism at all, where there is a rent-a-bike station owned by relatives of Mullen so tourists can navigate the island by bike. The story in the movie The Man of Aran in which Mullen played the role of a shark hunter, resulted in people from different countries becoming curious about the island, what life was like there, and how much of it was accurate to the movie. Mullen's written works and contribution to the movie also brought more awareness and tourism to Gaeltacht areas, as he wrote parts in Irish as well as English, including the Aran Islands as they are an official Gaeltacht area.

== Bibliography ==
- Man of Aran, Faber and Faber, 1934
- Hero Breed, Faber and Faber, 1936
- Irish Tales, Faber and Faber, 1938
- Come Another Day, Faber and Faber, 1940
