= The Mackinnons =

1977 British television drama series

- Genre: Drama
- Written by: N. J. Crisp, David Fisher, Lindsay Galloway, Robert Barr, Kenneth Clark, Wilfred Greatorex, Murray Smith
- Directed by: Gerard Glaister, Gerald Blake, Jonathan Alwyn, Martyn Friend, Pennant Roberts, Vere Lorrimer, Terence Williams
- Starring: Bill Simpson
- Country of origin: United Kingdom
- Original language: English
- No. of series: 1
- No. of episodes: 13

Production
- Producers: Gerard Glaister, Michael Chapman
- Running time: 50 minutes
- Production company: BBC

Original release
- Network: BBC One
- Release: 2 May – 1 August 1977

The Mackinnons is a BBC thirteen-part Scottish veterinary drama series, which was aired in 1977 and starred Bill Simpson.

== Cast ==
- Bill Simpson as Donald Mackinnon
- Mikel Lambert as Margaret Mackinnon
- Sandra Clark as Katherine Mackinnon
- William Wilde as Ian Turner
- Patrick Barr as Neil Turner
- Robert James as James Pringle

== Synopsis ==
Argyll vet Donald Mackinnon (Bill Simpson) runs a veterinary practice in the Scottish Highlands town of Inverglen, assisted by his adult daughter, Katherine (Sandra Clark). Donald is also a member of the local council and chairman of its planning committee. His sister-in-law Margaret (Mikel Lambert) is recently widowed. The family are wary of the influx of new people with differing lifestyles into their community.

== Production ==
The series, produced by Gerard Glaister, was designed to capitalise off the success of BBC TV medical drama series Dr. Finlay's Casebook (1962–1971), which also starred Bill Simpson in the title role, but was ultimately less successful. Only one series was made.

The opening shot of the series depicted Inveraray, to represent the fictional Argyll town of Inverglen.
