= Robert James (actor) =

Scottish actor (1924–2004)

- James in Doctor Who: The Power of the Daleks (1966)
- Born: Robert James McAllister; 28 March 1924; Paisley, Renfrewshire, UK
- Died: 31 July 2004 (aged 80); Middlesex, England,
- Occupation: Actor
- Spouse: Mona Bruce

Robert James (28 March 1924 – 31 July 2004) was a Scottish actor, who was best known for his television work.

== Career ==
Born in Paisley, Scotland, James trained to be a lawyer, before being spotted by a professional director while performing in amateur dramatics.

A handful of James' television performances have survived, but many of were amongst those discarded by UK broadcasters throughout the 1960s and 70s. One of his most remembered roles was in Doctor Who, playing the character Lesterson in the 1966 serial The Power of the Daleks. These six missing episodes now only exist as still photographs and audio recordings, although the serial was recreated as an animation in 2016. He would later return to the show in the serial The Masque of Mandragora.

== Marriage ==
He was married to actress Mona Bruce (1924-2008), until his death; they had one child, Clair Mcallister.

== Death ==
James died in 2004, aged 80, from Alzheimer's disease in Middlesex, England.

== Theatre ==
Year	Title	Role	Theatre Company	Director	Notes
1971	Confessions of a Justified Sinner	Wringhim	Lyceum Theatre, Edinburgh	Richard Eyre	Edinburgh International Festival

== Filmography ==
=== Film ===
Year	Title	Role	Notes
1956	Around the World in 80 Days	Extra (uncredited)	
1958	A Night to Remember	Engineer (uncredited)	
1959	The Bridal Path	Inspector	
1960	Two-Way Stretch	Police Superintendent	
1962	Masters of Venus	Stewart	Film serial
1963	Bitter Harvest	Police Sergeant (uncredited)	
1968	The Love Bug	Driver #31	
1971	Mary, Queen of Scots	John Knox	
1974	Captain Kronos – Vampire Hunter	Pointer	
1984	John Wycliffe: The Morning Star	Bishop Courtenay	
1993	Soft Top Hard Shoulder	Campbell	
1993	The Satan Killer	Radio DJ (voice)	
1996	The Innocent Sleep	Hopkin	

=== Television ===
Year	Title	Role	Notes
1958	The Diary of Samuel Pepys	Father of Child and Duke of Buckingham	3 episodes
1961	A Chance of Thunder	Hilton	3 episodes
1961	Pathfinders to Venus	Colonel Korolyov	Third sequel to Target Luna
1961	Triton	Lord Nelson	2 episodes
1961–1968	The Avengers	Merlin / Jenkins / Mellor / Ronnie Vance / Ronnie Vance	5 episodes
1962–1969	Dr. Finlay's Casebook	James Gibson	11 episodes
1963	Z-Cars	Maison	Episode: "Enquiry"
1964	Smuggler's Bay	Mr. Glennie	5 episodes
1965	Scales of Justice	Mr. Durrant	Episode: "The Hidden Face"
1965	For Whom the Bell Tolls	Lieutenant Berrendo	2 episodes
1965–1969	Out of the Unknown	Kelvin Brooke / Dr. Kersh	2 episodes
1965–1971	The Troubleshooters	Alastair McFee / Barry / Eldridge	3 episodes
1966; 1976	Doctor Who	Lesterson / High Priest / Man	2 serials: The Power of the Daleks; The Masque of Mandragora
1969	Counterstrike	Pythian	Episode: "The Lemming Syndrome"
1970	The Six Wives of Henry VIII	Robert Barnes	Episode: "Anne of Cleves"
1970	The Borderers	Maitland of Lethington	2 episodes
1970–1972	Doomwatch	Halliday (GLC Man) / Barker	2 episodes
1972	The Shadow of the Tower	Earl of Derby / Lord Stanley	5 episodes
1972	The Befrienders	Shaky Man	Episode: "Nobody Understands Miranda"
1973	Orson Welles Great Mysteries	Mr. Granger	Episode: "The Monkey's Paw"
1973–1974	Sutherland's Law	Hamish McNab	2 episodes
1973–1979	The Onedin Line	Rowland Biddulph / Major Nesbitt	6 episodes
1974	Steptoe and Son	Doctor	Episode: "Upstairs, Downstairs, Upstairs, Downstairs"
1975	The Five Red Herrings	Sir Maxwell Jamieson	3 episodes (Adaptation of the Lord Peter Wimsey story)
1977	Nicholas Nickleby	Newman Noggs	6 episodes
1977	The Mackinnons	James Pringle	
1978	The Four Feathers	John (the butler)	TV movie
1978	A Horseman Riding By	Captain Gleeson	Episode 12
1978	Blake's 7	Ven Glynd	Episode: "The Way Back"
1978	The Professionals	David Merlin / Cusak	2 episodes
1978	Robin's Nest	Doctor	Episode: “As Long as He Needs Me”
1979	The Ravelled Thread	Silas Tremble	6 episodes
1983	Shackleton	Sir John Scott-Keltie	3 episodes
1984	The Jewel in the Crown	Col. Beames	Episode: "Daughters of the Regiment"
1988	Rumpole of the Bailey	Dr. McAndrew	Episode: "Rumpole and the Quality of Life"
1992	Casualty	Gerry Mitchell	Episode: "Cascade"
1993	Century Falls	Dr. Josiah Naismith	4 episodes
1995	Taggart	Robert Menzies	Episode: "Black Orchid"
1998	Looking After Jo Jo	High Court Judge	
1999	Existo	Bar Tender	
