= Bill Simpson (actor) =

Scottish film and television actor (1931-1986)

- Born: William Nicholson Simpson; 11 September 1931; Dunure, Ayrshire, Scotland
- Died: 21 December 1986 (aged 55); Mauchline, East Ayrshire, Scotland
- Notable work: Dr. Finlay's Casebook
- Spouses: Mary Miller (m. 1965; div. 1969) Tracy Reed (m. 1974; div. 1982)
- Children: 2

William Nicholson Simpson (11 September 1931 – 21 December 1986) was a Scottish actor, best remembered for his portrayal of the title role in the long-running BBC TV series Dr. Finlay's Casebook.

== Career ==
=== Beginnings ===
Simpson began his career as a continuity announcer and newsreader for BBC Scotland and Scottish Television. His only appearance in a movie was as a non-speaking extra (his name was missing from the film credits) playing a bridegroom in the first remake of John Buchan's story The 39 Steps (1959), which starred Kenneth More as Richard Hannay. He devoted the rest of his career to television, radio and stage.

In 1962 BBC Television adapted Robert Louis Stevenson's novel The Master of Ballantrae in which Simpson played the part of Hastie in six 30-minute episodes. Later that year, he took the role of Mr. Ogilvie in "Appearance in Court", an episode of the popular BBC police drama, Z Cars.

=== Dr Finlay's Casebook ===
On 16 August 1962 the BBC began broadcasting its long-running Scottish medical drama Dr. Finlay's Casebook, with an episode called "It's All in the Mind". Simpson played the title role of Dr Alan Finlay, and was supported by Andrew Cruickshank as Dr Cameron, his older partner at the Arden House surgery in Tannochbrae, and Barbara Mullen as their housekeeper, Janet. With locations at Callander in Stirling, Scotland, the show ran for eight seasons, the final episode, "The Burgess Ticket", being shown on 3 January 1971. Simpson also starred in 104 audio episodes of the A. J. Cronin story, made by BBC Radio 4, from 1970 to 1975.

=== Later work ===
After Dr Finlay finished its television run Simpson continued to work for the BBC. In 1973 he took a role as MacNair in the Scottish independence drama series Scotch on the Rocks, which was broadcast in five 40-minute episodes.

In 1975 he appeared in one instalment of the BBC TV series Quiller. He played Sir Andrew Kilbrane, alongside Michael Jayston as Quiller, in an episode called "Target North", which involved the death of a government minister. He also took the part of Rob Dow in the BBC's Play of the Month series on 2 November 1975, in an adaptation of J. M. Barrie's play The Little Minister, in which he co-starred with Helen Mirren and Ian Ogilvy.

Simpson had a feature part in "Happy New Year, Some Say", a 1976 episode of the North East England drama When the Boat Comes In, playing Sandy Lewis.

Simpson then made a complete series of The Mackinnons, taking the starring role of Donald, vet and head of the Mackinnon family, who live in the Scottish Highlands, and feel threatened by the influx of new people with new lifestyles into their community. "Whose Side Are You On?" was the first instalment of 13. Only one series was made.

In 1977–78 Simpson appeared on stage at the Bradford Alhambra Theatre in the pantomime Cinderella, alongside Charlie Drake and Dora Bryan. And in 1978, Simpson played Professor Edmund Bartlett in "The Imprudent Professor", an episode of Return of the Saint, which starred Ian Ogilvy as Simon Templar.

He next travelled to France and West Germany to shoot the 1979 television mini-series Kidnapped, a co-production between HTV in England, Technisonor of France and Tele-München of Germany. Simpson played James of the Glens.

In 1980 he was one of the stars who took part in the ITV variety show performed in front of Princess Margaret, Night of One Hundred Stars, hosted by Terry Wogan. Later that year, he appeared as Dr. Hugh McFarlane in the Yorkshire Television series The Good Companions, a "very unusual musical comedy drama" based on the novel by J. B. Priestley, adapted by Alan Plater.

Given his history of heart problems, it is perhaps not surprising that Simpson became less busy around this time. He contributed less to television drama, and more to factual subjects, introducing the TV coverage of the British Open Golf Championship at Royal Troon in 1982, with Peter Alliss, and presenting "Leadership Matters", a middle management corporate video on behalf of The Industrial Society in 1984.

His final contributions to the performance side of television were 1983's Tyne Tees Television production, Andy Robson: Lost and Found, as Dr. George McKenzie; then in 1984 the Scottish Television docu-drama Scotland's Story: Mary and an End to the French Connection, playing John Knox; and one more, made in 1986, which he did not live to watch.

His role as a driver's boss in the TV drama, Shoot for the Sun, was aired posthumously, on 16 March 1987.

== Personal life ==
Bill Simpson was born in Dunure, Ayrshire, one of 5 children (2 girls, 3 boys, of whom he was the youngest). His father was an accountant who worked in Ayr, and his mother was a farmer's daughter. He spent every childhood holiday on his grandfather's farm.

He attended Ayr Academy and was raised an Ayr United fan, attending "every second Saturday" with his father and his brothers.

On 24 July 1965 Simpson married the actress Mary Miller in Callander, near Menteith. The couple bought a house called Tamavoid there. They divorced four years later, having had no children. He married Tracy Reed, with whom he had two children. The couple divorced in 1982.

Simpson died on 21 December 1986, at the age of 55, in Mauchline, East Ayrshire.

== Filmography ==
- The 39 Steps (1959) (uncredited)
