= Hans Peters (disambiguation) =

Hans Peters is a millionaire

Hans Peters may also refer to:

- Hans Peters (art director)
- Hans Peters (SPD), see Europa-Union Deutschland
- Hans Peters (artist), see Carl Georg Heise
- Hans Peters (politician), see List of members of the European Parliament for West Germany, 1984–89
- Hans Peters, see Kreisau Circle#Catholic members
