= Bruce Purchase =

New Zealand actor (1938–2008)

- Born: 2 October 1938; Thames, New Zealand
- Died: 5 June 2008 (aged 69); Putney, London, UK
- Occupation: Actor

Bruce Purchase (2 October 1938 – 5 June 2008) was a New Zealand actor known for his roles on stage and television. Born in Thames, New Zealand, he won a scholarship to study acting in England, training at RADA, and went on to become a founding actor-member of Laurence Olivier's National Theatre. He also performed regularly with the Royal Shakespeare Company.

His TV credits included Callan, The First Churchills, Clayhanger, A Picture of Katherine Mansfield, Doomwatch, Fall of Eagles, I, Claudius, The New Avengers, Doctor Who, Blake's 7, Quatermass and The Tripods. His films included Macbeth (1971), Mary, Queen of Scots (1971), The Optimists of Nine Elms (1973), Soft Beds, Hard Battles (1974), Meetings with Remarkable Men (1979), Pope John Paul II (1984), Wallenberg: A Hero's Story (1985), Playing Away (1987), Lionheart (1987) and Another Life (2001).

In 2007, Purchase became seriously ill while touring with a production of The Last Confession. He died of cancer on 5 June 2008 at his home in Putney, London.

== Filmography ==
- Othello (1965) - Senators-Soldiers-Cypriots
- Macbeth (1971) - Caithness
- Mary, Queen of Scots (1971) - Morton
- The Optimists of Nine Elms (1973) - Policeman
- Soft Beds, Hard Battles (1974) - Colonel Meinertzhagen (uncredited)
- The Secret Agent (1975) – Mr. Michaelis
- Doctor Who, The Pirate Planet (1978) - The Captain
- The Quatermass Conclusion (1979) - Tommy Roach
- Meetings with Remarkable Men (1979) - Father Maxim
- The Quiz Kid (1979) - Wally
- Pope John Paul II (1984) - Jerzy Loparicz
- Other Halves (1984) - Irwin
- Wallenberg: A Hero's Story (1985) - Rabbi Mandel
- Playing Away (1987) - Fredrick
- Lionheart (1987) - Simon Nerra
- Freddie as F.R.O.7 (1992) - Additional Voices (voice)
- Richard III (1995) - City Gentleman
- The Sea Change (1998) - Oldberg
- Another Life (2001) - Sir Henry Curtis-Bennett (final film role)
