= Annette Crosbie =

Scottish actor (born 1934)

Annette Crosbie OBE
- Born: Annette Ross Mcleod Crosbie; 12 February 1934 (age 92); Gorebridge, Midlothian, Scotland
- Occupation: Actress
- Years active: 1959–present
- Spouse: Michael Griffiths (m. 1961; div. 1985)
- Children: 2, including Selina Griffiths

Annette Crosbie (born 12 February 1934) is a Scottish actress. She is best known for her role as Margaret Meldrew in the BBC sitcom One Foot in the Grave (1990–2000). She twice won the BAFTA TV Award for Best Actress, for The Six Wives of Henry VIII in 1971 and in 1976 for Edward the Seventh.

Also in 1976, Crosbie was nominated for the BAFTA Award for Best Actress in a Supporting Role for the 1976 film The Slipper and the Rose and she won the award for Best Actress at the Evening Standard British Film Awards for the same role. Her other film appearances include The Pope Must Die (1991), Shooting Fish (1997), The Debt Collector (1999), Calendar Girls (2003) and Into the Woods (2014).

== Early life and career ==
Crosbie was born in Gorebridge, Midlothian, Scotland, as Annette Ross Mcleod Crosbie to Presbyterian parents who disapproved of her becoming an actress. Nevertheless, she joined the Bristol Old Vic Theatre School while still in her teens. She began her career with the Glasgow Citizens' Theatre Company in 1956. She was educated at Boroughmuir High School in Edinburgh. Her big break came in 1970 when she was cast as Catherine of Aragon in the BBC television series The Six Wives of Henry VIII, for which she won the 1971 BAFTA TV Award for Best Actress. In 1973, she starred alongside Vanessa Redgrave in the BBC serial A Picture of Katherine Mansfield.

In 1975, Crosbie made a similar impact as another queen, Queen Victoria, in the ITV period drama Edward the Seventh, for which she won the 1976 BAFTA TV Award for Best Actress. She played Cinderella's fairy godmother in The Slipper and the Rose, which was chosen as the Royal Film Première for 1976. In that film, Crosbie sang the Sherman Brothers' song, "Suddenly It Happens". Crosbie voiced the character of Galadriel in Ralph Bakshi's animated movie, The Lord of the Rings, filmed in 1978. In 1980, she played the abbess in Hawk the Slayer. In 1986, she appeared as the vicar's wife in Paradise Postponed.

Crosbie's next major role was as Margaret Meldrew, the long-suffering wife of Victor Meldrew (Richard Wilson) in the BBC sitcom One Foot in the Grave (1990–2000) for which she is best known. She also played Janet, the housekeeper to Dr. Finlay, in the 1993–96 revival of A. J. Cronin's popular stories. She also had a poignant role in the thriller The Debt Collector (1999).

Crosbie's other roles include playing the monkey-lover Ingrid Strange in an episode of Jonathan Creek (1997), Edith Sparshott in An Unsuitable Job for a Woman (1997–2001), and Jessie in the film Calendar Girls (2003).

In 2008, Crosbie appeared in a BBC adaptation of Little Dorrit. In 2009 she played Sadie Cairncross in the BBC television series Hope Springs. In 2010, Crosbie appeared in the Doctor Who episode "The Eleventh Hour" and in an episode of New Tricks. In 2014 Crosbie appeared in the movies What We Did on Our Holiday and Into the Woods. In 2015 she appeared in a BBC adaptation of Cider with Rosie. In 2016 she appeared in the new film version of Dad's Army. In 2019 she appeared in an episode of Call the Midwife.

In 2020, Crosbie appeared in an episode of the second season of After Life, a British black comedy-drama series created, written, produced and directed by Ricky Gervais, which premiered on Netflix.

== Honours ==
Crosbie was appointed Officer of the Order of the British Empire (OBE) in the 1998 New Year Honours for services to drama.

== Personal life ==
Crosbie was married to Michael Griffiths from 1961 until their divorce in 1985. The marriage produced two children, a son and a daughter. Their daughter Selina Griffiths, is also an actress.

Crosbie is a campaigner for greyhound welfare. From 2003 to 2006, she was president of the League Against Cruel Sports. In 2014, she was a vice-president. She was an honorary vice-president of the Scottish SPCA.

Crosbie lives in Wimbledon, London.

== Filmography ==
=== Film ===
| Year | Title | Role | Notes |
|---|---|---|---|
| 1959 | The Bridal Path | 1st Waitress | |
| 1965 | Sky West and Crooked | Mrs. White | |
| 1968 | Mrs. Brown, You've Got a Lovely Daughter | Maid (uncredited) | (uncredited) |
| 1972 | Follow Me! | Miss Framer | |
| 1976 | The Slipper and the Rose | Fairy Godmother | Evening Standard British Film Award for Best Actress; Nominated – BAFTA Award for Best Actress in a Supporting Role |
| 1976 | Mr Smith | Anon | Short film |
| 1978 | The Lord of the Rings | Lady Galadriel of Lothlorien | Voice |
| 1979 | A Question of Faith | Sofya Andreyevna | |
| 1980 | Hawk the Slayer | Abbess | |
| 1984 | Ordeal by Innocence | Kirsten Lindstrom | |
| 1991 | Chernobyl: The Final Warning | Dr. Galina Petrovna | |
| 1991 | The Pope Must Die | Mother Superior | |
| 1992 | Leon the Pig Farmer | Dr. Johnson | |
| 1995 | Solitaire for 2 | Mrs Dwyer | |
| 1997 | Shooting Fish | Mrs Cummins | |
| 1999 | The Debt Collector | Lana Keltie | |
| 2003 | Calendar Girls | Jessie | |
| 2007 | She's Not Dead | Mum | Short Film |
| 2014 | What We Did on Our Holiday | Doreen | |
| 2014 | Into the Woods | Granny | |
| 2016 | Dad's Army | Cissy Godfrey | |
| 2017 | Eat Locals | Alice | |

=== Television ===
| Year | Title | Role | Notes |
|---|---|---|---|
| 1961 | St. Patrick's Day | Lauretta | TV Short |
| 1962 | ITV Television Playhouse | Liz | Episode: "The Morning After" |
| 1962 | Probation Officer | Jennie Walker | Episode 4.3 |
| 1963 | BBC Sunday-Night Play | Julie Neill / Galia | Episodes: "The Greevy Column" & "The Reward of Silence" |
| 1963 | The Plane Makers | Brenda | Episodes: "The Dividing Line" & Them: Or Us?" |
| 1964 | Festival | Miss Vaughan | Episode: "The Inner World of Miss Vaughan" |
| 1964 | First Night | Ada Churnley | Episode: "Goodbye, Gloria, Goodbye" |
| 1965–1968 | Theatre 625 | Sister Catherine / Masha / Jennie Thomson / Girl | Episodes: "The Swallow's Nest", "The Seagull", "A Man Like That" & "Hermit Crabs" |
| 1965 | Story Parade | Elsie Forrest | Episode: "The Bachelors |
| 1965 | No Hiding Place | Mavis Baker | Episode: "It Could Always Happen" |
| 1965-1970 | The Wednesday Play | Julie / Liz | Episodes: "Wine of India" & "The Bond" |
| 1966 | This Man Craig | Hanna Seaton | Episode: "Dougie" |
| 1966 | Thirteen Against Fate | Nell | Episode: "The Murderer" |
| 1966 | Four People | Martha | Episode: "Mary Magdalene" |
| 1967 | Boy Meets Girl | Mrs. Parkman | Episode: "Long After Summer" |
| 1967 | The White Rabbit | José Dupuis | 3 episodes |
| 1968 | Half Hour Story | Wendy | Episode: "Venus Rising" |
| 1970 | The Six Wives of Henry VIII | Catherine of Aragon | Episode: "Catherine Aragon"; BAFTA TV Award for Best Actress |
| 1970 | Callan | May Coswood | Episode: "Amos Green must live". |
| 1970-1977 | Play of the Month | Frances Trebell / Miss Cooper | Episodes: "Waste" & "Separate Tables" |
| 1970-1980 | Play for Today | Nanny / Elsie Lorrimer / Catherine | Episodes: "Jessie", "The General's Day" & "The Lie" |
| 1970 | Thirty-Minute Theatre | Woman | Episode: "Hope" |
| 1970 | Menace | Jean Crowe | Episode: "Killing Time" |
| 1971 | Shadows of Fear | Mrs. Darbon | Episode: "At Occupier's Risk" |
| 1972 | ITV Playhouse | Joy | Episode: "A Splinter of Ice" |
| 1972 | Crime of Passion | Emilie | Episode: "Emilie" |
| 1972 | ITV Sunday Night Theatre | Nesta | Episode: "A Bit of Vision" |
| 1973 | A Picture of Katherine Mansfield | L. M. | 5 episodes |
| 1973 | The Edwardians | Margaret Lloyd George | Episode: "Lloyd George" |
| 1973 | Special Branch | Sarah Lovett | Episode: "The Other Man" |
| 1975 | The Boy Dave | Mavis | TV film |
| 1975 | Rooms | Miss Hicks | 2 episodes |
| 1975 | Churchill's People | Elizabeth Rush | Episode: "March On, Boys!" |
| 1975 | Edward the Seventh | Queen Victoria | 10 episodes BAFTA TV Award for Best Actress |
| 1976 | East Lynne | Cornelia Carlyle | TV film |
| 1977 | The Velvet Glove | Lilian Baylis | Episode: "Auntie's Niece" |
| 1977 | The Sunday Drama | Noele | Episode: "The Portrait" |
| 1978 | Lillie | Henrietta Labouchere | TV serial, 2 episodes |
| 1978 | BBC2 Play of the Week | Helen Langrishe | Episode: "Langrishe Go Down" |
| 1979 | The Lively Arts | Various | 1 episode |
| 1979 | Of Mycenae and Men | Kassandra | TV Short |
| 1980 | Festival: The Misanthrope | Arsinoé | TV film |
| 1980 | Twelfth Night | Maria | BBC Television Shakespeare |
| 1981 | Find Me First | Henrietta | TV Short |
| 1981 | The House on the Hill | Christina Rogerson | 3 episodes |
| 1981 | The Member for Chelsea | Christina Rogerson | 3 episodes |
| 1982 | East Lynne | Cornelia | TV film |
| 1982 | Saturday Night Thriller | Dorrie Childs | Episode: "A Gift of Tongues" |
| 1982 | The Disappearance of Harry | Lizzy | TV film |
| 1983 | Crown Court | Mrs Owen | Episode: "Mother's Boy" (Part 1) |
| 1983 | Richard III | Duchess of York | BBC Television Shakespeare |
| 1984 | Dramarama | Rose | Episode: "Que Sera" |
| 1984 | Pericles, Prince of Tyre | Dionyza | BBC Television Shakespeare |
| 1985 | Off Peak | Freda | TV film |
| 1986 | Paradise Postponed | Dorothy Simcox | TV mini-series, 10 episodes |
| 1986 | Unnatural Causes | Helen | Episode: "Partners" |
| 1986–1989 | Screenplay | Mrs Holders / Cynthia | 3 episodes |
| 1987 | Taggart | Maggie Davidson | Episode: "Funeral Rites" |
| 1987 | Tickets for the Titanic | Mrs Pollard | Episode: "The Way, the Truth, the Video" |
| 1987 | Farrington of the F.O. | Julia | Episode: "That Old Black Magic" |
| 1988 | Game, Set and Match | Mrs. Miller | Episode: "London Match: Part 1" |
| 1989 | Take Me Home | Liz | 3 episodes |
| 1989 | Bonne espérance | Miss Thurtson | |
| 1989 | Summer's Lease | Connie Tapscott | 2 episodes |
| 1990 | Colin's Sandwich | Joyce | Episodes: "Out to Lunch" & "Frank" |
| 1990–2000 | One Foot in the Grave | Margaret Meldrew | 41 episodes plus Comic Relief sketches in 1993 (voice only) and 2001; Nominated – Best Light Entertainment Performance; Nominated – British Comedy Awards Top TV Comedy Actress |
| 1991 | Jute City | Iris Kerr | Episode 1.1 |
| 1992 | Heartbeat | Penelope Stirling | Episode: "Old, New, Borrowed and Blue" |
| 1992 | The Ruth Rendell Mysteries | Irene Bell | Episode: The Speaker of Mandarin: Part One |
| 1993–1996 | Doctor Finlay | Janet MacPherson | 27 episodes |
| 1994 | Performance | 1st Labour MP | Episode: Message for Posterity |
| 1995–1996 | Screen Two | Dr Elizabeth MacKay / Meg Kelso | 2 episodes |
| 1997 | Jonathan Creek | Dr Ingrid Strange | Episode: "The House Of Monkeys" |
| 1997-1999 | An Unsuitable Job for a Woman | Edith Sparshott | 4 episodes |
| 1997 | Underworld | Aunt Doreen | 6 episodes |
| 1997 | Wyrd Sisters | Granny Weatherwax | voice - 6 episodes |
| 1999 | Oliver Twist | Mrs Bedwin | 4 episodes |
| 2000 | Anchor Me | Hattie Carter | TV film |
| 2001 | Waking the Dead | Moira Bowen | 2 episodes: "The Blind Beggar" |
| 2002 | Bodily Harm | Sheila Greenfield | 2 episodes |
| 2001–2003 | Murder in Mind | Rose Buttimore | Episode: "Rage" |
| 2004 | Black Books | Moo-Ma | Episode: "Moo-Ma and Moo-Pa" |
| 2004 | William and Mary | Mrs. Driscoll | Episode 2.5 |
| 2004 | Quite Ugly One Morning | Mrs. Kincross | TV film |
| 2005 | Bremner, Bird and Fortune | Queen Elizabeth II | Episode 6.4 |
| 2005 | Midsomer Murders | Amelia Plummer | Episode: "Sauce for the Goose" |
| 2005 | Footprints in the Snow | Julie's Mum | TV film |
| 2006 | Viva Blackpool | Mrs. Berry | TV film |
| 2008 | Little Dorrit | Mr F's Aunt | 6 episodes |
| 2009 | Hope Springs | Sadie Cairncross | 8 episodes |
| 2010 | Doctor Who | Mrs Angelo | Episode: "The Eleventh Hour" |
| 2010 | New Tricks | Miss Jones | Episode: "Coming Out Ball" |
| 2013 | Common Ground | Brenda | Episode: Nell, Ted & Marlon |
| 2014–2018 | Lily's Driftwood Bay | Nonna Dog | Voice role |
| 2015 | The Vicar of Dibley | Reverend Mavis Pipkin | Comic Relief: "The Bishop of Dibley" |
| 2015 | Cider with Rosie | Granny Trill | TV film |
| 2017 | Henry IX | Charlotte, The Queen Mother | 4 episodes |
| 2019 | Dial M for Middlesbrough | Edna | TV film |
| 2019 | Call the Midwife | Clarice Millgrove | Series 8 episode 2 |
| 2020 | After Life | Rosemary | Series 2 episode 1 |

=== Radio Appearances ===
- Good Behaviour (2014) on BBC Radio 4
- One Foot in the Grave (1995) 4 episodes adapted from the British television sitcom of the same name, first aired between 21 January 1995 and 11 February 1995 on BBC Radio 2. The episodes are "Alive and Buried", "In Luton Airport, No One Can Hear You Scream", "Timeless Time" and "The Beast in the Cage". They are repeated regularly on BBC Radio 4 Extra.
- Old Harry's Game as Edith Cordelia Barrington (from series 6 onwards) on BBC Radio 4
- The Price of Fear - Episode: To My Dear, Dear Saladin (6 June 1983) on BBC Radio 4
- The works of Robert Burns (2016) for BBC Radio Scotland

== Awards and nominations ==
| Year | Association | Category | Nominated work | Result |
|---|---|---|---|---|
| 1971 | British Academy Television Awards | Best Actress | The Six Wives of Henry VIII | Won |
| 1976 | British Academy Television Awards | Best Actress | Edward the Seventh | Won |
| 1977 | British Academy Film Awards | Best Actress in a Supporting Role | The Slipper and the Rose | Nominated |
| 1977 | Evening Standard British Film Awards | Best Actress | The Slipper and the Rose | Won |
| 1994 | British Academy Television Awards | Best Light Entertainment Performance | One Foot in the Grave | Nominated |
| 1995 | British Academy Television Awards | Best Comedy Performance | One Foot in the Grave | Nominated |
| 1995 | British Comedy Awards | Top TV Comedy Actress | One Foot in the Grave | Nominated |
