= De Grote Sinterklaasfilm =

2020 Dutch film directed by Lucio Messercola

- Theatrical release poster
- Directed by: Lucio Messercola
- Distributed by: WW Entertainment
- Release date: 7 October 2020 (Netherlands)
- Running time: 73 minutes
- Country: Netherlands
- Language: Dutch

De Grote Sinterklaasfilm (lit. 'The Great Sinterklaas Movie') is a 2020 Dutch film directed by Lucio Messercola. The film won the Golden Film award after having sold 100,000 tickets. It was the tenth highest-grossing Dutch film of 2020.

It was Bram van der Vlugt's last appearance as Sinterklaas; the film was released two months before his death.

== See also ==
- De Grote Sinterklaasfilm: Trammelant in Spanje
- De Grote Sinterklaasfilm: Gespuis in de Speelgoedkluis
