= A Picture of Katherine Mansfield =

1973 British TV drama series

- Genre: Drama
- Based on: The life and short stories of Katherine Mansfield
- Written by: Robin Chapman
- Directed by: Alan Cooke
- Starring: Vanessa Redgrave; Jeremy Brett; Annette Crosbie; Phyllida Law; Bruce Purchase
- Country of origin: United Kingdom
- Original language: English
- No. of episodes: 6

Production
- Producer: Rosemary Hill
- Running time: 50 minutes
- Production company: BBC

Original release
- Network: BBC Two
- Release: 1 May – 5 June 1973

A Picture of Katherine Mansfield is a 1973 BBC television drama series starring Vanessa Redgrave as writer Katherine Mansfield, Jeremy Brett as her second husband John Middleton Murry, and Annette Crosbie as her life-long friend Ida Baker, known as L.M. The series consists of six fifty-minute parts each including episodes of Mansfield's life interwoven with adaptations of her short stories, dramatized by English novelist, playwright, and screenwriter Robin Chapman (1933–2020).

== Cast ==
- Vanessa Redgrave as Katherine Mansfield
- Jeremy Brett as John Middleton Murry
- Lyndon Hughes as Josie
- Annette Crosbie as L.M.
- Phyllida Law as Mother
- Bruce Purchase as Father
- Geoffrey Burridge as Henry

== Short Story Adaptations ==
The Mansfield short story adaptations in each of the six episodes in the series each have their own cast, and are as follows:

- 1 'Psychology' and 'The Garden Party'
- 2 'Germans at Meat' and 'Something Childish but Very Natural'
- 3 'Je ne parle pas français' and 'Sun and Moon'
- 4 'The Aloe' and 'The Man Without a Temperament'
- 5 'Bliss' and 'The Daughters of the Late Colonel'
- 6 'At the Bay' and 'Prelude'
