= De Grote Sinterklaasfilm: Gespuis in de Speelgoedkluis =

2022 Dutch film directed by Lucio Messercola

- Film poster
- Directed by: Lucio Messercola
- Release date: 5 October 2022 (Netherlands)
- Country: Netherlands
- Language: Dutch

De Grote Sinterklaasfilm: Gespuis in de Speelgoedkluis is a 2022 Dutch film directed by Lucio Messercola. The film won the Golden Film award after having sold 100,000 tickets. It was the fourth best visited Dutch film of 2022 with just over 258,000 visitors.

Robert ten Brink, Jan Versteegh and Richard Groenendijk play a role in the film. Princess Laurentien of the Netherlands appears in the film. Royce de Vries, son of investigative journalist Peter R. de Vries, also appears in the film.

== See also ==
- De Grote Sinterklaasfilm
- De Grote Sinterklaasfilm: Trammelant in Spanje
