= List of Dr. Finlay's Casebook episodes =

This is a list of Dr. Finlay's Casebook television episodes from the series that ran from 1962 until 1971. It had eight series of original episodes. Series one to seven aired in black and white, series eight was aired in colour. A total of 191 50-minute episodes were produced; 123 are missing, 1 is incomplete.

== Series overview ==
Series	Episodes	Premiered:	Ended:
1	12	16 August 1962	1 November 1962
2	40	5 September 1963	28 June 1964
3	26	3 January 1965	27 June 1965
4	26	21 November 1965	15 May 1966
5	19	25 December 1966	14 May 1967
6	26	2 October 1967	24 March 1968
7	26	9 March 1969	31 August 1969
8	16	13 September 1970	3 January 1971

== Episodes ==
=== Series 1 (1962) ===
This series is the only series to have no episodes missing.

№ overall	№ in Series	Title	Airdate
1	1	"It's All in the Mind"	16 August 1962
2	2	"A Taste of Dust"	23 August 1962
3	3	"The Quack"	30 August 1962
4	4	"Conduct Unbecoming"	6 September 1962
5	5	"What Money Can't Buy"	13 September 1962
6	6	"Cough Mixture"	20 September 1962
7	7	"Carver Tam"	27 September 1962
8	8	"What Women Will Do"	4 October 1962
9	9	"Snap Diagnosis"	11 October 1962
10	10	"The Dragon Plate"	18 October 1962
11	11	"A Spotless Reputation"	25 October 1962
12	12	"Behind Closed Doors"	1 November 1962

=== Series 2 (1963–64) ===
№ overall	№ in Series	Title	Airdate	Notes
13	1	"A Time for Laughing"	5 September 1963	
14	2	"Clean Sweep"	12 September 1963	
15	3	"The Heat of the Moment"	19 September 1963	
16	4	"Cup, Hands or Cards"	26 September 1963	
17	5	"A Time for Discretion"	4 October 1963	Missing.
18	6	"Alice, Where Art Thou?"	11 October 1963	Missing.
19	7	"Ride in a Wheelchair"	18 October 1963	Missing.
20	8	"A Questionable Practice"	25 October 1963	Previously missing; recovered in 2016.
21	9	"Odds on Johnny"	1 November 1963	Missing.
22	10	"The Face Saver"	8 November 1963	Missing.
23	11	"Room for Doubt"	15 November 1963	Missing.
24	12	"Possessed of Devils"	6 December 1963	Missing.
25	13	"Cry Wolf"	13 December 1963	Missing.
26	14	"The Deep End"	20 December 1963	Missing.
27	15	"The Polygraph"	27 December 1963	
28	16	"A Present from Father"	5 January 1964	
29	17	"A Test of Intelligence"	12 January 1964	
30	18	"Charlie is My Darlin'"	19 January 1964	Missing.
31	19	"My Late Dear Husband"	26 January 1964	Missing.
32	20	"The White Hunter"	2 February 1964	Missing.
33	21	"The Whole Truth"	9 February 1964	Missing.
34	22	"A Shot in the Arm"	16 February 1964	Missing.
35	23	"A Matter of Proof"	23 February 1964	Missing.
36	24	"A Call from Cogger"	1 March 1964	Missing.
37	25	"A Man May Drink"	8 March 1964	Missing.
38	26	"The Big Fight"	15 March 1964	Missing.
39	27	"Stranger in Town"	22 March 1964	Missing.
40	28	"The Yellow Streak"	29 March 1964	Missing.
41	29	"Without the City"	5 April 1964	Missing.
42	30	"The Aristocrats"	12 April 1964	Missing.
43	31	"The Spirit of Dr. McGregor"	26 April 1964	
44	32	"Mortal Sin"	3 May 1964	Missing.
45	33	"The Hallelujah Stakes"	10 May 1964	Missing.
46	34	"Short of a Miracle"	17 May 1964	Missing.
47	35	"The True Lochiel"	24 May 1964	Missing.
48	36	"The Old Indomitable"	31 May 1964	Missing.
49	37	"The Red Herring"	7 June 1964	
50	38	"The Confrontation"	14 June 1964	
51	39	"Dear Doctor"	21 June 1964	Missing.
52	40	"The Doctor Cried"	28 June 1964	Missing.

=== Series 3 (1965) ===
№ overall	№ in Series	Title	Airdate	Notes
53	1	"The Control Group"	3 January 1965	Missing.
54	2	"The Raiders"	10 January 1965	Missing.
55	3	"The Eternal Spring"	17 January 1965	Missing.
56	4	"A Right to Live"	24 January 1965	
57	5	"The Bull Calf"	31 January 1965	Missing.
58	6	"Devil's Dozen"	7 February 1965	Missing.
59	7	"Charity, Dr Finlay"	14 February 1965	
60	8	"Laughing Gas"	21 February 1965	Missing.
61	9	"The Gate of the Year"	28 February 1965	
62	10	"Off the Hook"	7 March 1965	
63	11	"The Next Provost But One"	14 March 1965	
64	12	"Soon or Late"	21 March 1965	Incomplete
65	13	"The Good Fisherman"	28 March 1965	Missing.
66	14	"A Little Learning"	4 April 1965	
67	15	"Belle"	11 April 1965	
68	16	"In Committee"	18 April 1965	
69	17	"Another Opinion"	25 April 1965	
70	18	"The Spinster"	2 May 1965	
71	19	"Medical Finance"	9 May 1965	
72	20	"Beware of the Dog"	16 May 1965	
73	21	"Doctor's Lines"	23 May 1965	
74	22	"The Deceivers"	30 May 1965	
75	23	"The End of the Season"	6 June 1965	
76	24	"A Woman's Work"	13 June 1965	
77	25	"The Immortal Memory"	20 June 1965	
78	26	"An Evening Out"	27 June 1965	Missing.

=== Series 4 (1965–66) ===
№ overall	№ in Series	Title	Airdate	Notes
79	1	"The Phantom Piper of Tannochbrae"	21 November 1965	
80	2	"The Champion"	28 November 1965	Missing.
81	3	"The Draper of Dumfries"	5 December 1965	Missing.
82	4	"The Longest Visit"	12 December 1965	Missing.
83	5	"Body and Soul"	19 December 1965	Missing.
84	6	"The Vision"	26 December 1965	Missing.
85	7	"Miss Letitia"	2 January 1966	Missing.
86	8	"They Do It in Africa"	9 January 1966	Missing.
87	9	"The Anxious Man"	16 January 1966	Missing.
88	10	"Hear No Evil"	23 January 1966	Missing.
89	11	"The General"	30 January 1966	Missing.
90	12	"Free Medicine"	6 February 1966	Missing.
91	13	"The Seniority Rule"	13 February 1966	Missing.
92	14	"A Matter of Confidence"	20 February 1966	Missing.
93	15	"For Services Rendered"	27 February 1966	Missing.
94	16	"To Err is Human"	6 March 1966	Missing.
95	17	"Better Safe Than Sorry"	13 March 1966	Missing.
96	18	"O Sole Mio"	20 March 1966	Missing.
97	19	"No Subsidy for Sin"	27 March 1966	Missing.
98	20	"Kate and Robert"	3 April 1966	Missing.
99	21	"Written with the Left Hand"	10 April 1966	
100	22	"A Settled Man"	17 April 1966	Missing.
101	23	"Crusade"	24 April 1966	
102	24	"Legacy"	1 May 1966	Missing.
103	25	"The Decision"	8 May 1966	Missing.
104	26	"The Uninvited Guest"	15 May 1966	Missing.

=== Series 5 (1966–67) ===
№ overall	№ in Series	Title	Airdate	Notes
105	1	"The Gifts of the Magi"	25 December 1966	
106	2	"Resolution"	1 January 1967	Missing.
107	3	"The Comical Lad"	8 January 1967	Missing.
108	4	"Under the Hammer"	15 January 1967	Missing.
109	5	"The Masterpiece"	22 January 1967	Missing.
110	6	"Who Made You?"	29 January 1967	Missing.
111	7	"Bird Seed and Begonias"	12 February 1967	Missing.
112	8	"The Greatest Burden"	19 February 1967	Missing.
113	9	"The Forgotten Enemy"	26 February 1967	Missing.
114	10	"Possessed"	5 March 1967	Missing.
115	11	"Life of a Salesman"	12 March 1967	Missing.
116	12	"Over My Dead Body"	19 March 1967	Missing.
117	13	"A Penny Saved"	2 April 1967	Missing.
118	14	"Call in Cameron"	9 April 1967	
119	15	"The Sons of the Hounds"	16 April 1967	
120	16	"A Question of Conflict"	23 April 1967	
121	17	"Advertising Matter"	30 April 1967	
122	18	"A Happy Release"	7 May 1967	
123	19	"Safety in Numbers"	14 May 1967	Missing.

=== Series 6 (1967–68) ===
№ overall	№ in Series	Title	Airdate	Notes
124	1	"Criss-Cross"	2 October 1967	Missing.
125	2	"The Emotional Factor"	9 October 1967	Missing.
126	3	"Come Back, Little Willie"	16 October 1967	Missing.
127	4	"Time Past - Time Future"	23 October 1967	Missing.
128	5	"Buy Now - Pay Later"	30 October 1967	
129	6	"Accidents Never Happen"	6 November 1967	Missing.
130	7	"Random Sample"	13 November 1967	Missing.
131	8	"Tell Me True"	20 November 1967	
132	9	"Persons Unknown"	27 November 1967	Missing
133	10	"It's the System"	4 December 1967	Missing.
134	11	"Death is a Colony"	11 December 1967	Missing.
135	12	"The McTavish Bequest"	18 December 1967	Missing.
136	13	"Unfit to Marry"	24 December 1967	Previously missing; recovered in 2022.
137	14	"The Public Patient"	31 December 1967	
138	15	"A Moral Problem"	7 January 1968	
139	16	"The Cheats"	14 January 1968	
140	17	"Conscience Clause"	21 January 1968	
141	18	"The Dynamiser"	28 January 1968	Missing.
142	19	"The North Side of Ben Vorlich"	4 February 1968	Missing.
143	20	"Out of the Blue"	11 February 1968	Missing.
144	21	"The Equilibrium"	18 February 1968	Missing.
145	22	""Is There Anybody There?" Said The Traveller"	25 February 1968	Missing.
146	23	"For Richer, for Poorer"	3 March 1968	Missing.
147	24	"Sweet Sorrow"	10 March 1968	Missing.
148	25	"Scots Wha Hae"	17 March 1968	Missing.
149	26	"To Janet - A Son"	24 March 1968	Missing.

=== Series 7 (1969) ===
№ overall	№ in Series	Title	Airdate	Notes
150	1	"The Visitation"	9 March 1969	Missing.
151	2	"The Honours List"	16 March 1969	Missing.
152	3	"The Times We Live In"	23 March 1969	Missing.
153	4	"Pastures New"	30 March 1969	Missing.
154	5	"The Greatest of These is Charity"	6 April 1969	Missing.
155	6	"A Man of Parts"	13 April 1969	Missing.
156	7	"A Dove in the Nest"	20 April 1969	Missing.
157	8	"Big Ben"	27 April 1969	Missing.
158	9	"The Barrier"	4 May 1969	Missing.
159	10	"The Rat Race"	11 May 1969	Missing.
160	11	"Put Your Cross Here"	18 May 1969	Missing.
161	12	"The Stick of the Rocket"	25 May 1969	Missing.
162	13	"Fresh Worlds"	1 June 1969	Missing.
163	14	"Conquest"	8 June 1969	Missing.
164	15	"The Facts of Life"	15 June 1969	Missing.
165	16	"Single or Return"	22 June 1969	Missing.
166	17	"Oak, Mahogany or Walnut"	29 June 1969	Missing.
167	18	"The Call"	6 July 1969	Missing.
168	19	"Lack of Communication"	13 July 1969	
169	20	"Monstrous Regiment"	20 July 1969	Missing.
170	21	"Blood and State"	27 July 1969	Missing.
171	22	"Action, Dr Cameron"	3 August 1969	Missing.
172	23	"The Will to Live"	10 August 1969	Missing.
173	24	"The Evangelist"	17 August 1969	Missing.
174	25	"The Cheap Departed"	24 August 1969	Missing.
175	26	"Opportunity and Inclination"	31 August 1969	

=== Series 8 (1970–71) ===
This series was produced in colour. This was the final series.

№ overall	№ in Series	Title	Airdate	Notes
176	1	"A Late Spring"	13 September 1970	
177	2	"Dead Fall"	20 September 1970	Missing.
178	3	"Comin' Thro' The Rye"	27 September 1970	
179	4	"The Builders"	4 October 1970	Missing.
180	5	"Not Qualified"	11 October 1970	
181	6	"Snares and Pitfalls"	18 October 1970	Missing.
182	7	"Dorrity"	25 October 1970	
183	8	"Winter's Traces"	1 November 1970	Missing.
184	9	"The Honeypot"	8 November 1970	
185	10	"Made for Each Other"	22 November 1970	Missing.
186	11	"A Good Prospect"	29 November 1970	
187	12	"Responsibilities"	6 December 1970	
188	13	"Dust"	13 December 1970	Missing.
189	14	"Itself and Friend"	20 December 1970	Missing.
190	15	"A Question of Values"	27 December 1970	
191	16	"The Burgess Ticket"	3 January 1971	
