= Doctor Finlay =

Television series about a fictional doctor

- Created by: A. J. Cronin
- Starring: David Rintoul; Ian Bannen; Annette Crosbie; Jason Flemyng; Jessica Turner
- Country of origin: United Kingdom
- Original language: English
- No. of series: 4
- No. of episodes: 27

Production
- Executive producers: Robert Love; Bernard Krichefski; Bill Clark
- Running time: 60 minutes (including adverts)
- Production company: Scottish Television

Original release
- Network: ITV
- Release: 5 March 1993 – 20 December 1996

Doctor Finlay is a British television series based on A. J. Cronin's stories about the fictional medical hero, Dr. Finlay.

It was first broadcast on 5 March 1993 on ITV.

It is a follow-up to Dr. Finlay's Casebook, the successful BBC series and takes place in the 1940s after John Finlay returns from war service. Early storylines include the setting up of the new National Health Service and the modernisation of the medical practice at Arden House, Tannochbrae, Scotland.

The show stars David Rintoul as Dr. Finlay, Ian Bannen as his semi-retired practice partner, Dr. Cameron, and Annette Crosbie as his housekeeper, Janet. Other central characters include Finlay's assistant, Dr. Neil, played by Jason Flemyng and Finlay's new partner, Dr. Napier, played by Jessica Turner.

The series was a Scottish Television production (now known as STV Studios) that was filmed in Auchtermuchty, Fife, Scotland. It also used the Dumgoyne Peak and Loch Lomond as supposedly local backdrops although these are not close to Auchtermuchty. It aired in the U.S. on PBS' Masterpiece Theatre.

== Cast ==
- David Rintoul as Dr. John Finlay
- Ian Bannen as Dr. Alexander Cameron
- Annette Crosbie as Janet MacPherson
- Jason Flemyng as Dr. David Neil
- Jessica Turner as Dr. Jennifer Napier
- Gordon Reid as Angus Livingstone
- Margo Gunn as Brenda Maitland
- Jackie Morrison as Rhona Swanson

== See also ==
- Dr. Finlay
- Dr. Finlay's Casebook (TV & radio)
