= Destination Milan =

1954 film

- Directed by: Lawrence Huntington; Leslie Arliss; John Gilling
- Produced by: Tom D. Connochie
- Starring: Tom Duggan; Lorraine Clewes; Christopher Lee
- Cinematography: Jimmy Wilson
- Edited by: Peter Taylor
- Music by: Allan Gray
- Production company: Douglas Fairbanks Productions Ltd
- Release date: 1954
- Running time: 78 minutes
- Country: United Kingdom
- Language: English

Destination Milan is a 1954 anthology film comprising three episodes, directed by Lawrence Huntington, Leslie Arliss, and John Gilling. The episodes first appeared independently of each other in the Rheingold Theatre television series (1953) and are introduced by Douglas Fairbanks.

== Episodes ==
"Lowland Fling" (director: Arliss) is a comedic story with Cyril Cusack, John Laurie and Barbara Mullen.

"The Guilty Person" (director: Gilling) is a melodrama with Greta Gynt and Peter Reynolds as Karel, a Norwegian artist who murders his brother.

"Destination Milan" (director: Huntington) features parallel stories of travellers on the Orient Express: a circus performer's wife with circus agent Christopher Lee, and an American tourist saved from buying a fake painting by intervention of a train guard.

== Reception ==
The Monthly Film Bulletin wrote: "In his superbly diffident introduction to his three short films, Douglas Fairbanks outlines the virtues of the short story. Like the short story, the short film relies upon neatness of plot and the unexpected twist for its appeal; but here low-budget production reduces action to a minimum, and the onus falls upon the acting and writing. In the first film ["Destination Milan"], two stories are extracted from the passengers on the Orient express, but the script is pedestrian and the characters make little impression. "Lowland Fling" relies entirely on the comedy performances of John Laurie and Cyril Cusack, who work hard at a mawkish script. Only in "Guilty Person" is any distinction achieved: the direction has some authority, the plot is ingenious, and Peter Reynolds contributes an effective study of an unscrupulous waster."

Kine Weekly wrote: "Magazine comedy melodrama comprised of three short stories. The first has two 'yolks' and the others one, but all are stagy and handicapped by phoney accents. Douglas Fairbanks, Jnr. is the compere, but has little to add, apart from 'star' value. So-so British second."
