= Valley of Shadows (ballet) =

Ballet

Valley of Shadows is a one-act ballet created by Kenneth MacMillan in 1983 for the Royal Ballet. The music is by Pyotr Ilyich Tchaikovsky (extracts from Hamlet and Souvenir de Florence) and Bohuslav Martinů (Double Concerto, 1938). The story is loosely based on the novel The Garden of the Finzi-Continis by Giorgio Bassani. The designer was Yolanda Sonnabend, who had first collaborated with him on 1963's Symphony.

== Original cast ==
The first performance was on 3 March 1983, at the Royal Opera House, Covent Garden.

- Alessandra Ferri
- Sandra Conley
- Julie Wood
- Derek Deane
- Guy Niblett
- David Wall
- Ashley Page

== See also ==
- List of ballets by title
