= Memorandum van een dokter =

Dutch television series

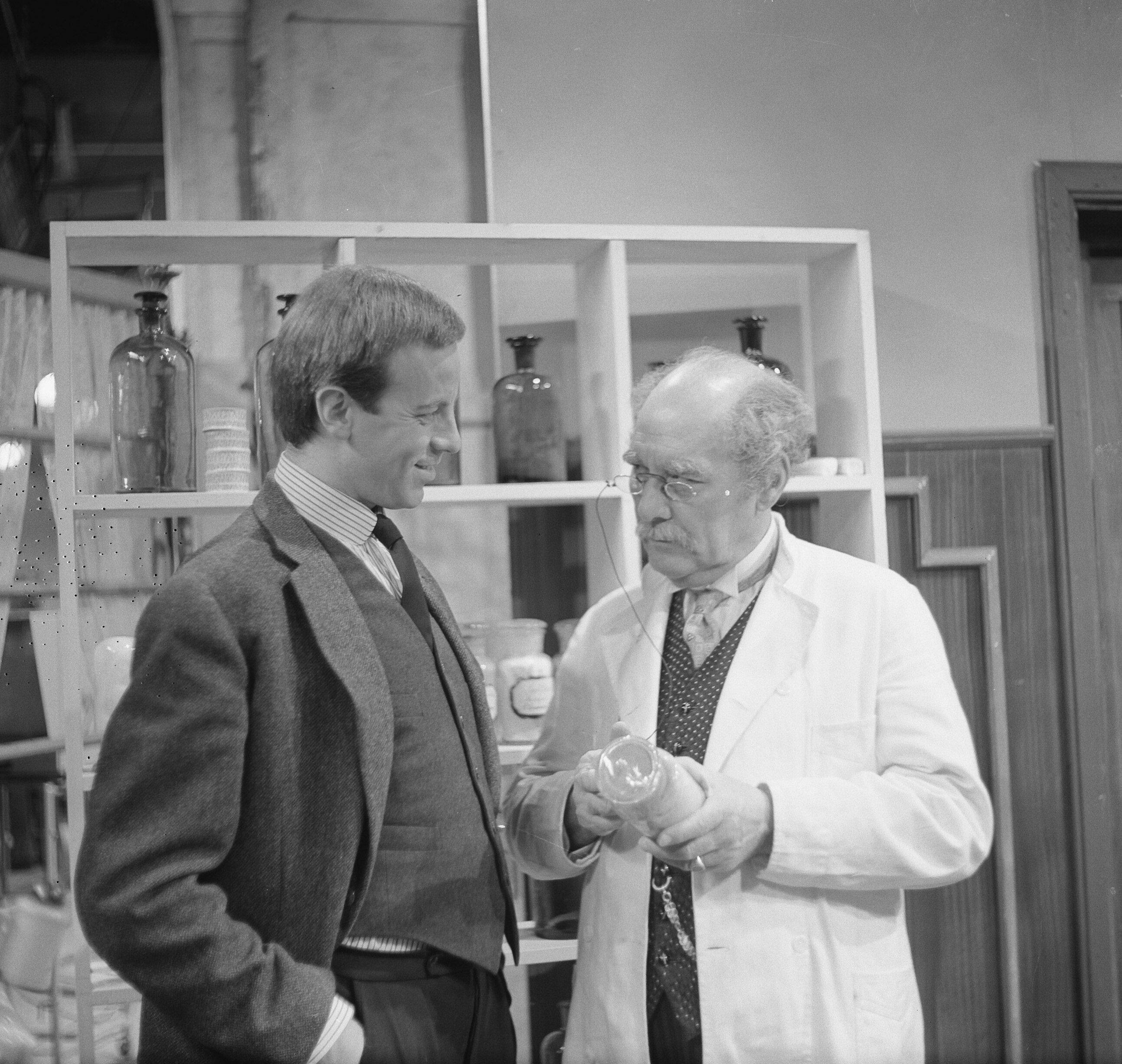
- Bram van der Vlugt (left) and Rob Geraerds
- Created by: A. J. Cronin
- Starring: Bram van der Vlugt; Rob Geraerds; Fien Berghegge
- Country of origin: Netherlands
- Original language: Dutch

Original release
- Release: 27 October 1963 – 1965

Memorandum van een dokter is a Dutch television series based on A. J. Cronin's stories about the fictional hero, Dr. Finlay. The series was broadcast from 1963 to 1965 and was directed by Peter Holland. It starred Bram van der Vlugt as Dr. Finlay, Rob Geraerds as Dr. Cameron, and Fien Berghegge as Janet.
