= Minu, Lorestan =

Minu مينو
- Village
- Location within Iran
- Coordinates: 33°10′46″N 48°34′32″E
- Country: Iran
- Province: Lorestan
- County: Khorramabad
- Bakhsh: Papi
- Rural District: Keshvar

Population (2006)
  - Total: 63
- Time zone: UTC+3:30 (IRST)
  - Summer (DST): UTC+4:30 (IRDT)

Minu (Persian: مينو, also Romanized as Mīnū; also known as Mīnū ‘Olyā) is a village in Keshvar Rural District, Papi District, Khorramabad County, Lorestan Province, Iran. At the 2006 census, its population was 63, in 12 families.
