= The Satan Killer =

- original film poster
- Directed by: Stephen Calamari
- Written by: Edward Benton; James Brandauer
- Produced by: Joel Silverman; Garrett Stewart; Goldstar International
- Starring: Stephen Sayre; Billy Franklin; James Westbrook; Belinda Borden; Cindy Healy; Nick Delon; Christopher Litz; Sherri R.
- Edited by: Peter Serrano
- Music by: Angelo Badalamenti
- Distributed by: A.I.P Home Video
- Release date: August 25, 1993
- Running time: 90 minutes
- Language: English

The Satan Killer is a 1993 American thriller-horror film directed and written by Stephen Sayre (under the name Stephen Calamari). The film is an American crime-horror flick filmed in Virginia Beach, Virginia. It is widely distributed through A.I.P Home Video.

== Plot ==
A police detective's fiance is killed by a maniacal, murdering crystal meth dealer dubbed by the media as, "The Satan Killer" played by James Westbrook, so he decides to go on a solo head hunt for him. Along the way, he teams up with an ex-cop (Billy Franklin) and an ex-male nurse.

The main character, detective Stephens, is an atrocious alcoholic, drowning his sorrows daily. At one point he gets saved from a brutal beating by a drag queen. Throughout his Journey, he ends up brutally killing about a half dozen innocent people who stand in his way of apprehending The Satan Killer. We then find the Satan Killer's real name is Jimbo. Soon after, we discover his twisted sordid history. A scene is played where Jimbo is only a young man, and asks a priest why his mother and God hate him. Jimbo begins crying, then the film cuts to a scene with him, as a troubled adult male, standing in front of a church, where he shouts at the top of his lungs in anger "You never fooled me!".

Yet, there is a soft side to Jimbo. During another scene, Jimbo's boss (and drug supplier) attempts to rape a young blonde. Jimbo tells him to lay off her and spares her life. As it turns out, we learn Jimbo's mother was an abusive stripper battling an addiction who ridiculed him throughout childhood. The blonde young woman resembled his mother so he felt for her and saved her life.

The Satan Killer viciously stalks the streets and takes down evil. At one point Detective Stephens catches a pimp in an alleyway beating up a hooker. Upon gaining his attention he asks "whats your name?". The pimp responds by pulling a gun and then getting shot in the chest by Stephens as three punk clad teens watch in horror. One teen merely cusses at Stephens. Even though Stephens is prone to violent behavior, Stephens simply walks off to continue his tirade, sparing the children perhaps due to an unspoken camaraderie. The Satan Killer is finally apprehended and killed at the conclusion of the film.
