= Dr. Finlay =

- First appearance: Country Doctor
- Created by: A. J. Cronin
- Portrayed by: Bill Simpson; David Rintoul; John Gordon Sinclair

In-universe information
- Gender: Male
- Occupation: Medical Practitioner
- Nationality: British

Dr Finlay is a fictional character, the hero of a series of stories by Scottish author A. J. Cronin.

== Short stories ==
The character Dr Finlay first appeared in Cronin's novella Country Doctor and in several subsequent short stories published in Hearst's International Combined with Cosmopolitan magazine from 1935 to 1939. The stories were later collected and republished under several titles, including Adventures of a Black Bag, Dr Finlay of Tannochbrae, Further Adventures of a Country Doctor and Dr Finlay's Casebook.

Dr Finlay is a general physician beginning his practice in the fictional Scottish town of Levenford. One of the later short stories takes him to the lochside village of Tannochbrae. In these stories he is charming and becomes well-acquainted with his patients over many years. It is thus his trademark to know them from birth to death and so provide a continuous relationship.

== Adaptations ==
The stories were used as the basis of the long-running BBC television programme Dr Finlay's Casebook, screened from 1962 to 1971, and the radio series of the same title (1970–78). In these productions the main character, rechristened Dr Alan Finlay, was played by Bill Simpson. He was made the newly joined junior partner in the Tannochbrae practice of Dr Angus Cameron, played by Andrew Cruickshank, with Janet McPherson, their unflappable housekeeper and receptionist at Arden House, played by Barbara Mullen. Another local doctor is Dr Snoddie who works alone. (Eric Woodburn played Doctor Alexander Snoddie.)

Dr Finlay returned to television in the ITV series, Doctor Finlay, continuing the stories into the late 1940s. This version starred David Rintoul as Dr Finlay, Ian Bannen as Dr Cameron and Annette Crosbie as Janet. It was later broadcast in the U.S. on PBS's Masterpiece Theatre.

The characters made their return to radio in 2001, when BBC Radio 4 broadcast a six-episode series, Dr Finlay: Adventures of a Black Bag, set in Levenford, with John Gordon Sinclair voicing Dr Finlay, Brian Pettifer as Dr Cameron, Katy Murphy as Janet and the nurse Peggy Angus played by Sharon Small. This was followed by two series of Dr Finlay: Further Adventures of a Black Bag in 2002 and 2003, with Sinclair and Pettifer joined by Celia Imrie as Janet and Stella Gonet as Nurse Angus.

A Dutch adaptation of the Doctor Finlay series entitled Memorandum van een dokter was broadcast on Dutch television from 1963 to 1965, starring Bram van der Vlugt.
