= Robert ten Brink =

Dutch television presenter

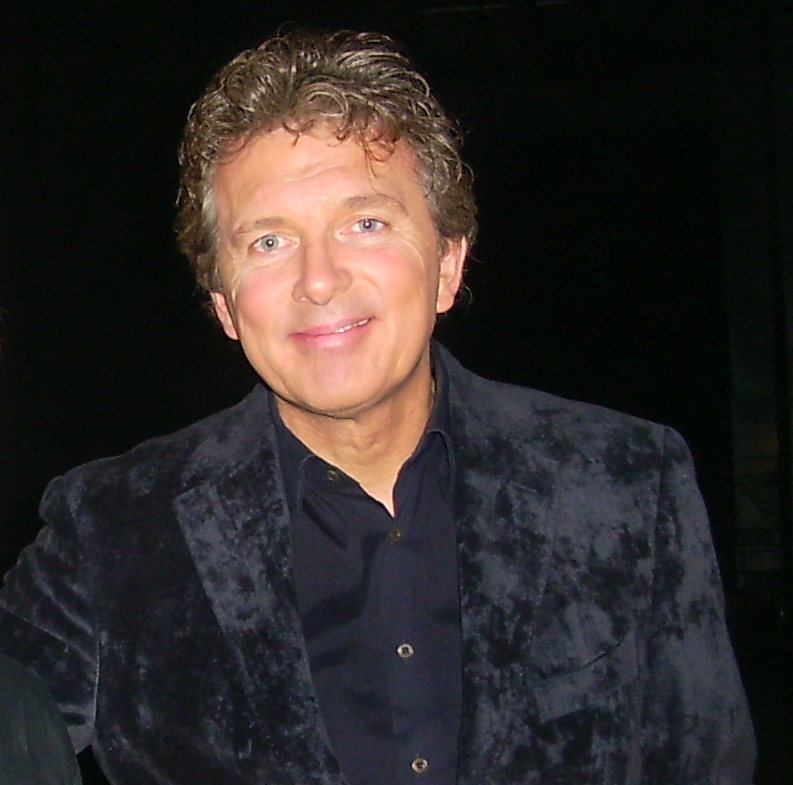
- Robert ten Brink (2009)
- Born: 20 October 1955 (age 70); Amsterdam, Netherlands
- Occupation: Presenter
- Years active: 1979-present
- Spouse: Roos Cialona

Robert ten Brink (Amsterdam, 20 October 1955) is a Dutch presenter.

He won the Golden TeleVizier-Ring in 1993 for his television program All you need is love. In 1997, he was chosen as the Netherlands' most popular TV personality. He has been married since 1981 to Roos Cialona, with whom he has five children, all of them are girls.

== Career ==
In 1979 he began as a disc jockey. In 1981 he began his TV career with the TV quiz Cijfers en Letters (Numbers and Letters, based on the French television programme). He began hosting TV shows like Superfan and Wereldwijs, but he especially became famous with Jeugdjournaal from the NOS. In 1989 he began hosting the original version of Lingo. In 1992 he went to Veronica, where he hosted the very successful All You Need is Love, which usually had more than 4 million viewers, which at the time was almost a third of the entire population. In 1998 he went to SBS6, where he continued to host All You Need is Love. In 1999 he began hosting the very popular TV quiz Lotto Weekend Miljonairs. He was the host of Big Diet, where heavy people try to lose weight. When Lotto, the main sponsor of Weekend Miljonairs, decided to get the program to RTL 4, he almost lost his program. Because SBS6 had stopped with All You Need is Love and didn't have another program for him to host, he signed a 3-year contract with RTL, where he continued to host Lotto Weekend Miljonairs. In 2008 the Lotto stopped sponsoring Weekend Miljonairs which resulted in the show stopping. Because of this, Ten Brink hosted the Dutch version of The Moment of Truth in the fall of 2008. He began hosting the entertainment programme Laat Ze Maar Lachen on RTL4, in April 2009. In November 2009, he began hosting the game show Succes Verzekerd, which was originally hosted by Carlo Boszhard. In 2019, he returned as the host of the revived show Lotto Weekend Miljonairs, which had become renamed into BankGiro Miljonairs (VriendenLoterij Miljonairs since 2021).

In 2021, he appeared as Sinterklaas in the film De Grote Sinterklaasfilm: Trammelant in Spanje.

In 2022, he appears in the film De Grote Sinterklaasfilm: Gespuis in de Speelgoedkluis. He also played roles in the films De Grote Sinterklaasfilm en de Strijd om Pakjesavond (2023) and De Grote Sinterklaasfilm: Stampij in de bakkerij (2024).

== List of programmes ==
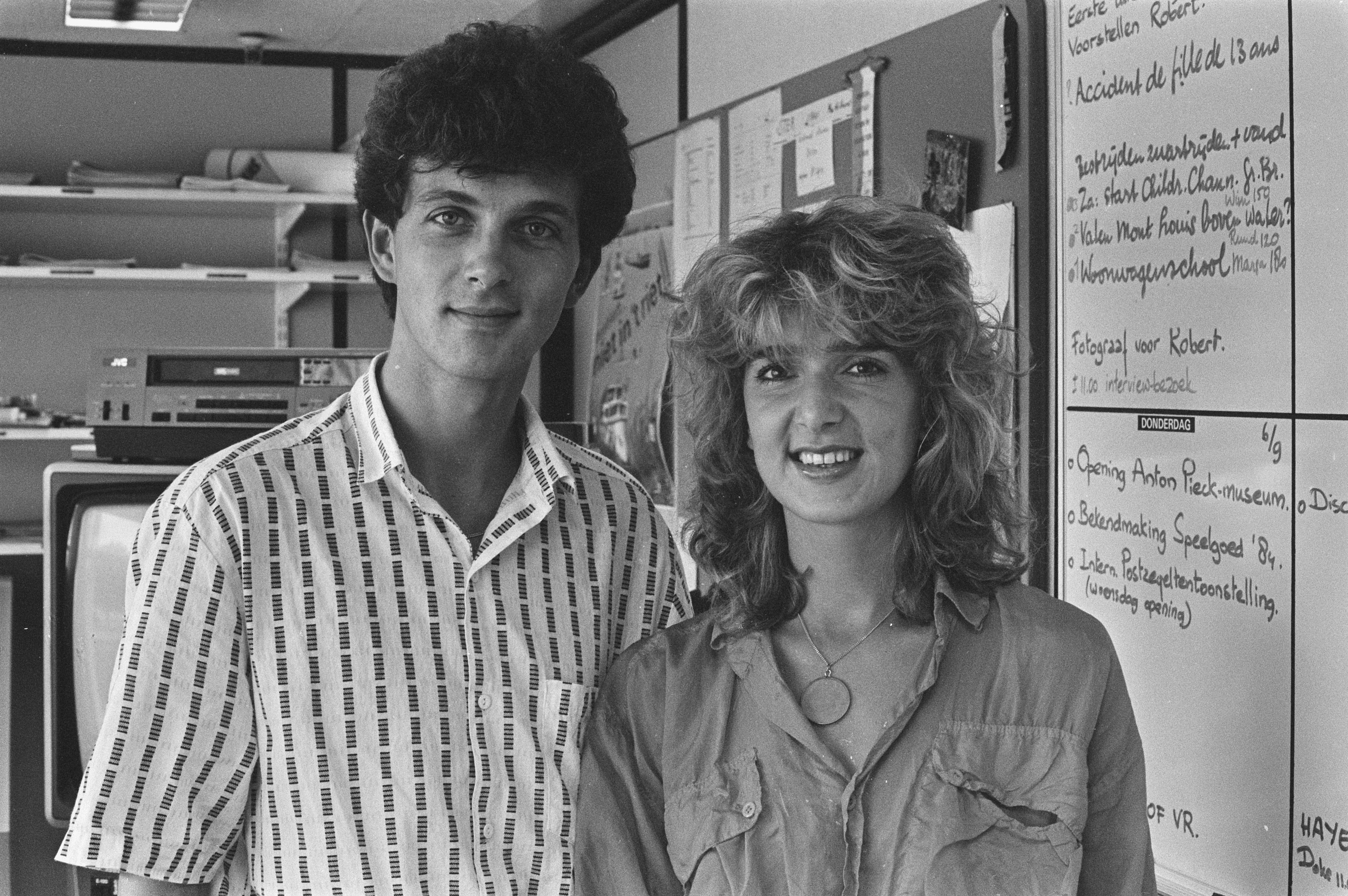
Ten Brink & Leoni Jansen (1984)

He is/was the presenter of these programmes:

KRO (1979–1982)

- De Noenshow, radioprogramme
- Cijfers en Letters

NOS (1983–1989)

- Jeugdjournaal

VARA (1986–1992)

- De Steen en Been Show, radioprogramme
- Superfan
- Wereldwijs
- Lingo (Dutch version)

Veronica (1992–1998)

- All You Need is Love
- Sportfreaks
- De Travestie Show
- Make My Day

SBS6 (1998–2006)

- All You Need is Love
- Lotto Weekend Miljonairs
- Achmea Kennisquiz
- Loveboat Amorina
- Big Diet
- Super Robert
- Sterrenbeurs
- Hoe gaat het met?

RTL (2006–current)

- Lotto Weekend Miljonairs
- Klasgenoten
- De nationale Carrierecheck
- Koffietijd!
- All You Need is Love
- Merry Little Christmas
- NL Vertrekt
- Het moment van de waarheid
- Laat Ze Maar Lachen
- Het Zesde Zintuig
- Succes Verzekerd
- Holland's Got Talent
- De Bachelor
