= Min-woo =

- Hangul: 민우
- RR: Minu
- MR: Minu

Min-woo is a Korean given name.

== People ==
People with this name include:

=== Entertainers ===
- Lee Min-woo (actor) (born Lee Dong-min, 1976), South Korean actor
- Lee Min-woo (born 1979), South Korean singer, member of Shinhwa
- Seo Min-woo (1985–2018), South Korean singer, former member of boy band 100%
- No Min-woo (born 1987), South Korean actor and singer, former member of rock band TraxX
- Park Min-woo (actor) (born 1988), South Korean actor
- Quan Minyu (Korean name Jun Min-woo, 2004–2016), Chinese child singer and dancer of Korean descent
- Hwang Min-woo (born 2005), South Korean child actor

=== Sportspeople ===
- Kim Min-woo (infielder) (born 1979), South Korean baseball player (Korea Baseball Organization)
- Kim Min-woo (figure skater) (1986–2007), South Korean ice dancer
- Kim Min-woo (footballer) (born 1990), South Korean football midfielder (J-League Division 2)
- Cho Min-woo (born 1992), South Korean football centre back (J-League Division 2)
- Jung Min-woo (born 1992), South Korean football forward (K-League 2)
- Min Woo Lee (born 1998), Australian professional golfer of Korean descent
- Park Min-woo (baseball) (born 1993), South Korean baseball player (Korea Baseball Organization)

=== Other ===
- Hyung Min-woo (born 1974), South Korean manhwa artist

== Fictional characters ==
Fictional characters with this name include:

- Jang Min-woo, in 2012 South Korean television series To the Beautiful You (based on Hokuto Umeda)
- Jo Min-woo, in 2010 South Korean television series Giant
- Kang Min-woo, in 2004 South Korean television series Forbidden Love
- Lee Min-woo, in 2012 South Korean television series Golden Time
- Yoo Min-woo, in 2003 South Korean television series Summer Scent

== See also ==
- List of Korean given names
