= Barbara Mullen =

American born actress (1914–1979)

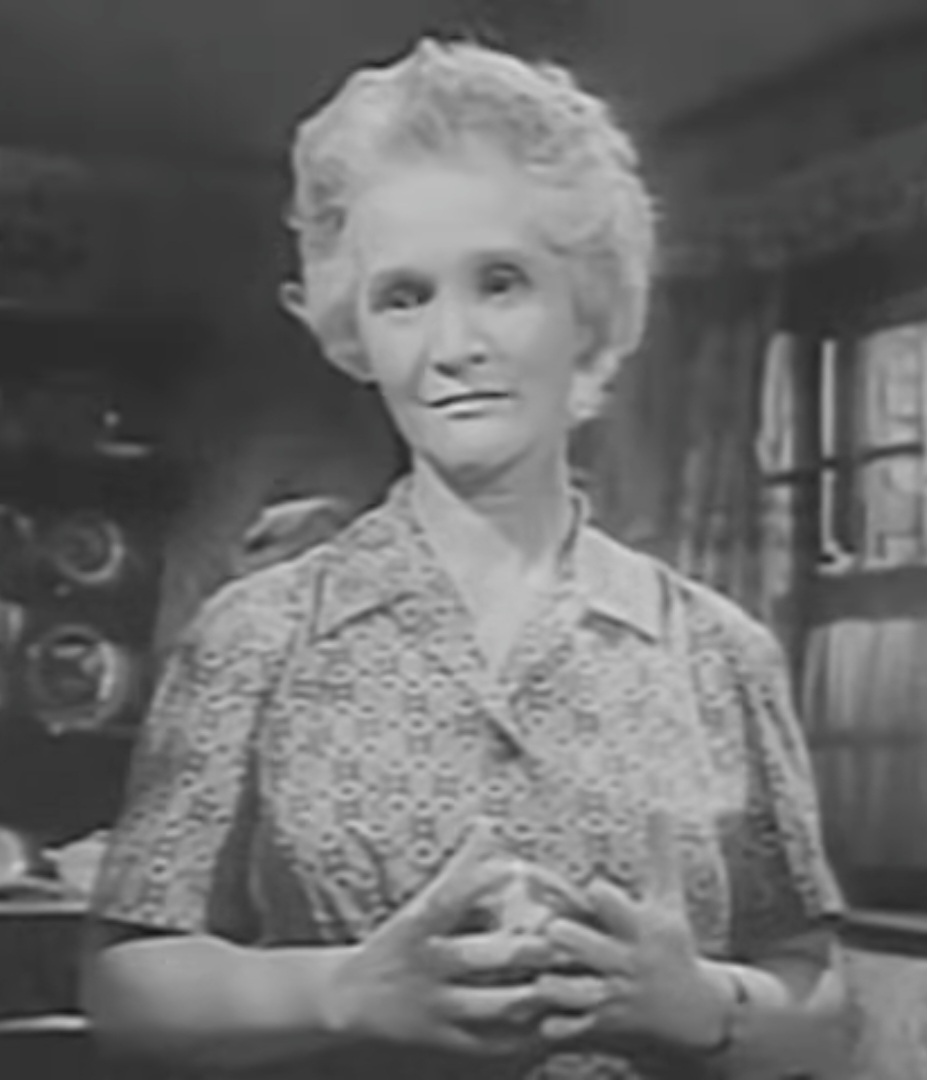
- Mullen in an episode of One Step Beyond (1960)
- Born: Barbara Eleanor Mullen; 9 June 1914; Boston, Massachusetts, U.S.
- Died: 9 March 1979 (aged 64); London, England
- Occupation: Television actress
- Years active: 1941–1978
- Spouse: John Taylor
- Parent(s): Pat Mullen; Bridget Mullen

Barbara Mullen (9 June 1914 – 9 March 1979) was an American-born actress well known in the United Kingdom for playing the part of Janet McPherson, the housekeeper in Dr. Finlay's Casebook. Although the role of Janet brought her fame in later years, she already had made her mark in the theatre.

== Career ==
Mullen's parents were Pat and Bridget. Pat was from a fishing family on Inishmore island off the coast of County Galway, Ireland. He met his first wife, Bridget in South Boston, Massachusetts, where she had emigrated from Galway with her late husband, Patrick Crowe. Mullen was born in Boston. She made her stage debut as a dancer at the age of three. When her father returned to Aran, later contributing to the making of Man of Aran, the classic documentary film by Robert J. Flaherty, her mother stayed in the U.S. to bring up the 8 children. Mullen sang and danced in various theatres all over the U.S. and then moved to the UK in 1934, where she trained at the Webber Douglas Academy of Dramatic Art.

She wrote Life is my Adventure, her autobiography, at 23. A year later she made her London debut, acting the title role in the London West End production of Jeannie, a comedy about a Scottish girl taking a European holiday after coming into money. She became an overnight star.

She later succeeded Celia Johnson as Mrs. De Winter in Daphne du Maurier's Rebecca, played Maggie in a revival of What Every Woman Knows by J.M. Barrie, and played the aged sleuth Miss Marple in The Murder at the Vicarage by Agatha Christie.

Mullen repeated the role of 'Jeannie' on television and in the 1941 British film, which was her cinema debut, alongside Michael Redgrave, and she followed this with appearances in 20 more films, including A Place of One's Own, Corridor of Mirrors and Innocent Sinners. She also played a notable role in the 1942 film version of Robert Ardrey's Thunder Rock as Ellen Kirby, the feminist who is jailed for her subversive ideas.

She is credited on six records singing traditional songs and hymns.

She was married to documentary film-maker John Taylor, Man of Aran's cameraman, and they had two daughters, Briged and Susannah.

She appeared on television in America and Britain in programmes such as Juno and the Paycock and The Danny Thomas Show before being offered the role in Dr. Finlay's Casebook, which began on the BBC in 1962. Her character, Janet McPherson, was the ever-efficient housekeeper to Doctors Finlay and Cameron at Arden House in the fictional Scottish village of Tannochbrae. When the series was nearing its end on television, in 1970 it transferred to radio - running until 1978.

She was the subject of This Is Your Life in March 1964 when she was surprised by Eamonn Andrews in central London.

Barbara Mullen died at Hammersmith Hospital, London from a heart attack on 9 March 1979.

== Filmography ==
Year	Title	Role	Notes
1941	Jeannie	Jeannie McLean	
1942	Thunder Rock	Ellen Kirby	
1944	Welcome, Mr. Washington	Jane Willoughby	
1945	A Place of One's Own	Mrs. Smedhurst	
1946	The Trojan Brothers	Margie Castelli	
1948	Corridor of Mirrors	Veronica	
1948	My Sister and I	Hypatia Foley	
1951	Talk of a Million	Bessie Murnahan	
1952	So Little Time	Anna	
1952	The Gentle Gunman	Molly Fagan	
1954	The Last Moment	Mrs. O'Driscoll	(segment: 'The Sensible Man')
1954	Destination Milan	Miss Busbee	
1958	Innocent Sinners	Mrs.Vincent	
1959	The Siege of Pinchgut	Mrs. Fulton	
1960	The Challenge	Ma Piper	
1963	The Very Edge	Dr. Shaw	
1966	Miss MacTaggart Won't Lie Down	Miss MacTaggart	short film

== Sources ==
- Life is My Adventure, Barbara Mullen, Faber & Faber, London, 1937.
- Man of Aran, Pat Mullen, E.P. Dutton & Co., New York, 1935.
