= Sandra Conley =

British ballet dancer

Sandra Conley (born 24 October 1943) is a former ballet dancer, a principal dancer with the Royal Ballet.

Conley was born on 24 October 1943 in Hatfield, England.

In 1962, Conley made her debut with the Royal Ballet's touring company, and in 1970 transferred to the Covent Garden company. She was promoted to principal dancer in 1980.

Conley created the lead female role in Kenneth MacMillan's Valley of Shadows. She also created lead roles in Antony Tudor's Knight Errant (1968), Frederick Ashton's Creatures of Prometheus (1969), MacMillan's Manon (1974), and John Neumeier's Gustav Mahler's Fourth Symphony (1977).

Conley danced Empress Elisabeth in the 1983 New York City premiere of MacMillan's Mayerling. In her later career, she was a character artist with the Royal Ballet.
