= Hans-Peter Vietze =

- Born: March 15, 1939; Germany
- Died: October 9, 2008 (aged 69); Germany
- Occupations: Mongolist, translator, professor
- Employer: Humboldt University of Berlin
- Known for: Mongolian–German dictionary, Mongolian studies

Hans-Peter Vietze (March 15, 1939 – October 9, 2008) was a German Mongolist. He was the editor of a Mongolian–German dictionary, and worked as a translator for the highest level of the German government.

Hans-Peter Vietze completed his studies in Mongolian, Turkic and Altaic Studies at Humboldt University in 1960. He travelled to Mongolia more than 100 times, completed his doctorate, and in 1976 he became Professor for Mongolian studies at the Humboldt University and was the first freely elected head of the Department of Asia Studies after the collapse of East Germany. In the early 2000s, he worked as a freelance translator and counselor a.o. for the German Federal Government.
