= Hans Peter Christian Hansen =

Farmer, hotel-keeper, and community leader

Hans Peter Christian Hansen (29 December 1851 – 10 July 1910) was a New Zealand farmer, hotel-keeper and community leader. He was born in Assens, Denmark on 29 December 1851.
