= Het Moment Van De Waarheid =

Dutch television game show

- Genre: Game Show
- Presented by: Robert ten Brink
- Country of origin: Netherlands

Production
- Producer: Blue Circle
- Running time: 60 minutes

Original release
- Network: RTL 4
- Release: September 6, 2008 – January 31, 2009

Tier	Questions	Prize Amount
1	6	€1,000
2	5	€5,000
3	4	€15,000
4	3	€35,000
5	2	€50,000
6	1	€100,000

Het Moment Van De Waarheid (Dutch pronunciation: [ət moːˈmɛnt fɑn də ˈʋaːrɦɛit]; (Note: In isolation, van is pronounced [vɑn].) "The Moment of Truth") is a Dutch game show based on the Nada más que la verdad. Contestants answer a series of 21 increasingly personal and embarrassing questions to receive cash prizes. The show is hosted by Robert ten Brink and aired on RTL 4. The show premiered on September 6, 2008 and the first season ended on November 1, 2008. A second season started in January 2009 with 4 additional episodes.

== Format ==
Prior to the show, a contestant is hooked up to a polygraph and asked 50 questions; there is no polygraph testing conducted during the actual show. Without knowing the results of the polygraph, he or she is asked 21 of those same questions again on the program, each becoming progressively more personal in nature. If the contestant answers honestly, according to the polygraph results, he or she moves on to the next question; however, should a contestant lie in his or her answer (as determined by the polygraph), the game ends, and the contestant wins nothing. For each tier of questions answered correctly, the contestant wins the corresponding amount of money. A contestant has to decide to stop and take the won amount of money or to continue before he or she hears the next question.
