= Hans Peter Aglassinger =

Austrian industrial designer

Hans Peter Aglassinger (born 1963 in Salzburg, Austria) is an Austrian industrial designer who is known for being one of the principals of TEAMS Design GmbH in Esslingen, Germany. He is best known for his award-winning work for Robert Bosch GmbH. Hans Peter has been instrumental in keeping many long-term relationships alive with companies such as Robert Bosch, Still, Silit and Leifheit.

== History ==
Aglassinger studied industrial design at the University of Arts and Industrial Design Linz in Austria. He designed for TEAMS Design GmbH in Esslingen, working directly with Hans Erich Slany before becoming a partner in 2002. He continues to actively contribute to the design culture at TEAMS. Aglassinger has also taught and lectured at neighboring universities such as University of Graz in Austria and University of Wuppertal in Germany. He has also been interviewed on various international sites.

== Recent Design Awards ==
2002
iF Product Design Award

- Robert Bosch GmbH GBH 540 Hammer Drill and the AH40-24 Hedge Trimmer

2003
iF Product Design Award

- Robert Bosch GmbH D-Tect 100 Universal Positioning Device and the GWS 14.4V Cordless Angle Grinder

Red Dot Design Award

- Robert Bosch GmbH GOF 2000 CE Professional Router

2004
iF Product Design Award

- Robert Bosch GmbH GEX 150 Turbo Professional Orbital Sander, GSB 20-2 RE Hammer Drill, and the IXO Cordless Compact Screwdriver, CS20 Circular Saw

2006
iF Product Design Awards

- Schüco Window Design Handle Line

2007
Red Dot Design Award

- Robert Bosch GmbH GWS 15-125 CITH Professional Angle Grinder, GSH 16-30 Professional Demolition Hammer, DLE 50 Professional Laser Rangefinder, and the GDR 10.8 V-LI Professional Cordless Impact Driver

iF Package Design Award

- Robert Bosch GmbH Mini X-Line Power Tool Cassettes (update) and the X-Line Range of Power Tool Cases (update)

Deutscher Verpackungs Preis

- Robert Bosch GmbH X-Line Range of Power Tool Cases

ISH Design Plus Award

- Schüco Absorption Refrigerator

2008
Red Dot Design Honorable Mention Swiss Star Package Design Award

- Robert Bosch GmbH Robust Line

iF Packaging Design Award

- Robert Bosch GmbH X-Line Range Power Tool Accessory Cases and the Mini X-Line Power Tool Accessory Cassettes

2009
Red Dot Awards

- Robert Bosch GTM 12 Combination Saw, GWS 22-180 LVI / 24-180 LVI Angle Grinder and the Uneo 3-in-1 Power Tool

2010
iF Award Robert Bosch AHS 54-20 LI Cordless Hedgecutter and ASB 10.8 LI Cordless Shrub and Grass Shear Set

== Patents ==
- Misc. Patents 1
- Misc. Patents 2
- Misc. Patents 3
- Misc. Patents 4
- Misc. Patents 5
