= De Grote Sinterklaasfilm: Trammelant in Spanje =

2021 Dutch film directed by Lucio Messercola

- Directed by: Lucio Messercola
- Release date: 6 October 2021 (Netherlands)
- Running time: 75 minutes
- Country: Netherlands
- Language: Dutch

De Grote Sinterklaasfilm: Trammelant in Spanje (lit. 'The Great Sinterklaas Movie: Trouble in Spain') is a 2021 Dutch film directed by Lucio Messercola. The film won the Golden Film award after having sold 100,000 tickets. The film finished in 19th place in the list of best visited films in the Netherlands in 2021 with just over 210,000 visitors.

Robert ten Brink plays the role of Sinterklaas. The film also features television personality Martien Meiland and investigative journalist Peter R. de Vries.

Part of the film was filmed in De Rijp, Netherlands.

== See also ==
- De Grote Sinterklaasfilm
- De Grote Sinterklaasfilm: Gespuis in de Speelgoedkluis
