= Hans Peter Keller =

German poet

Hans-Peter Keller (11 March 1915 – 11 May 1989) was a German poet who authored several poem collections, e.g. Auch Gold rostet (Even Gold Rusts) or Panoptikum aus dem Augenwinkel (Panopticum seen from the corner of the eye). In the 1960s Hans-Peter Keller was teacher of literature at the vocational school for librarians in Düsseldorf.
