= -minu =

Swiss journalist

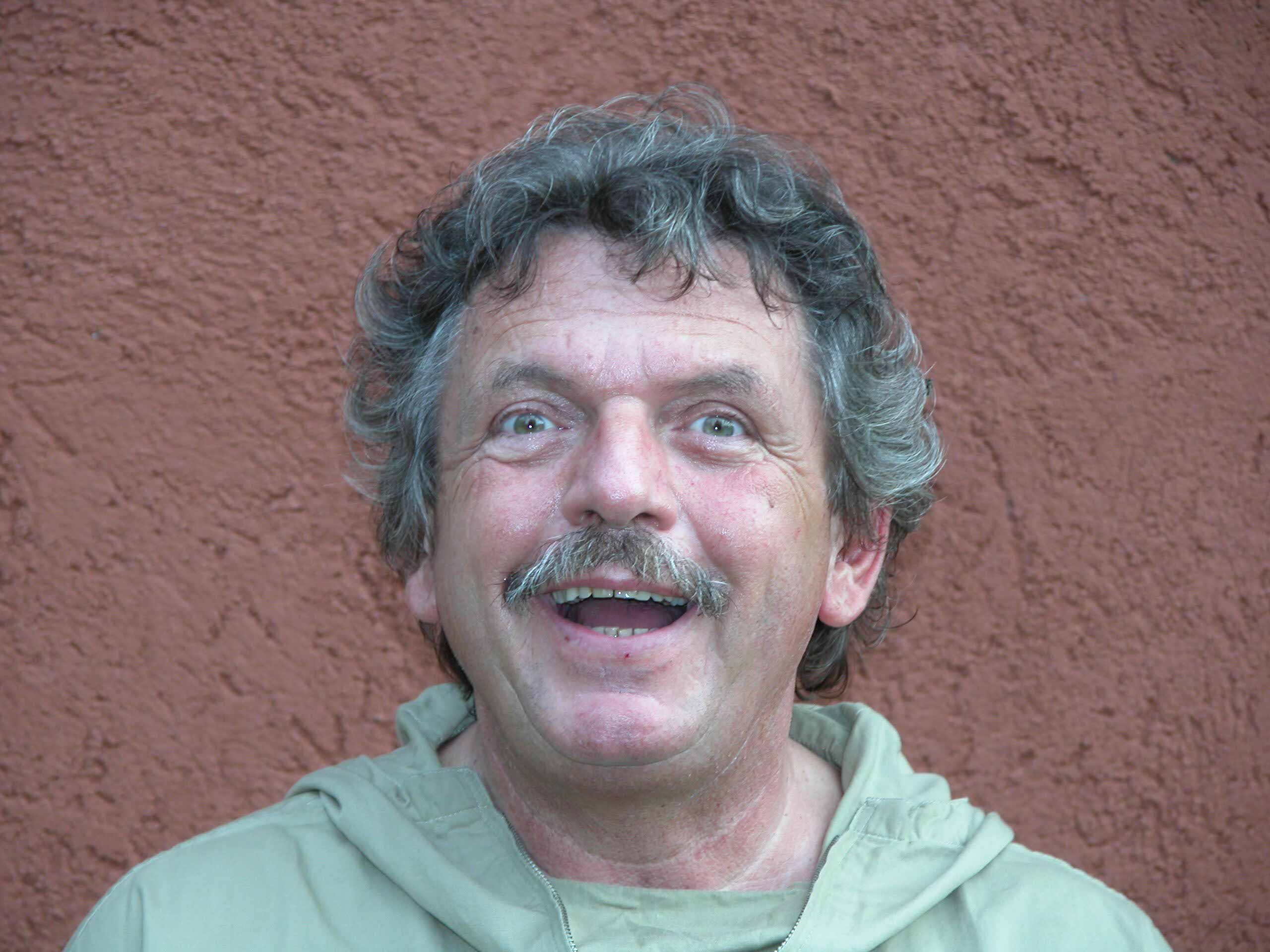
- -minu (Hans-Peter Hammel) in 2003
- Born: Hans-Peter Hammel; 16 June 1947; Basel, Switzerland
- Occupation: Journalist

Hans-Peter Hammel better known as -minu (pronounced "meenoo"),, (born 16 June 1947) is a Swiss journalist. He was born in Basel and hosted a cooking show, Kuchiklatsch.

== Books ==
- -minu's Basler Küche (-minu's Basel cooking), published by Opinio Verlag, Basel, 2003 ISBN 3-03999-026-8
- Von Menschen und Dingen (About People and Things), published by Verlag Dr. Kovac, ISBN 3-86064-035-6
- Alltagsgeschichten: Band 7 (Stories of Everyday Life), published by Opinio Verlag, Basel ISBN 3-85815-310-9
- Basel z'nacht: Ein Foto-Album mit poetischen Texten (Basel T'night: A photo album with poetic texts), published by GS-Verlag, Basel ISBN 3-7185-0123-6
- Weihnachtsgeschichten – ein bisschen anders (Christmas Stories - a bit differently), published in September 2004 by Opinio Verlag, Basel ISBN 3-03999-040-3
