= Dr. Finlay's Casebook =

BBC TV drama series (1962–1971)

- Created by: A. J. Cronin
- Directed by: Prudence Fitzgerald
- Starring: Bill Simpson; Andrew Cruickshank; Barbara Mullen
- Country of origin: United Kingdom
- Original language: English
- No. of series: 8
- No. of episodes: 191 (123 missing, 1 incomplete) (list of episodes)

Production
- Running time: 5.0 min.

Original release
- Network: BBC Television/BBC 1
- Release: 16 August 1962 – 3 January 1971

Dr. Finlay's Casebook is a television drama series produced and broadcast by the BBC from 1962 until 1971. Based on A. J. Cronin's 1935 novella Country Doctor, the storylines centred on a general medical practice in the fictional Scottish town of Tannochbrae during the late 1920s. Cronin was the primary writer for the show between 1962 and 1964.

== Characters ==
The main characters were Dr. Finlay, the junior partner in the practice, played by Bill Simpson; Dr Cameron, the craggy senior partner, played by Andrew Cruickshank; and Janet, their unflappable housekeeper and receptionist at Arden House, played by Barbara Mullen. Other recurrent characters included Dr Snoddie, Finlay's crusty detractor and Janet's admirer, played by Eric Woodburn; and gossipy Mistress Niven, the district nurse and midwife, played by Effie Morrison.

== Cast ==
- Bill Simpson as Dr Alan Finlay
- Andrew Cruickshank as Dr Angus Cameron
- Barbara Mullen as Janet MacPherson
- Eric Woodburn as Dr Alexander Snoddie
- Effie Morrison as Mistress Niven (district nurse)
- Neil Wilson as Sgt Gilbey
- David Macmillan as Constable Dickie
- Molly Urquhart as Matron
- Robert James as Mr Gibson
- Delia Paton as Sister
- Bryden Murdoch as Galbraith
- Marigold Sharman as Mrs Rae
- James Copeland as 'Hooky' Buchanan
- Helena Gloag as Mrs Ballantyne
- Leonard Maguire as Lewis Gilbride
- Calum Mill as Andrew McGregor
- John Clegg as Dr Mitchell
- Janet Davies as Nurse

== Filming location ==
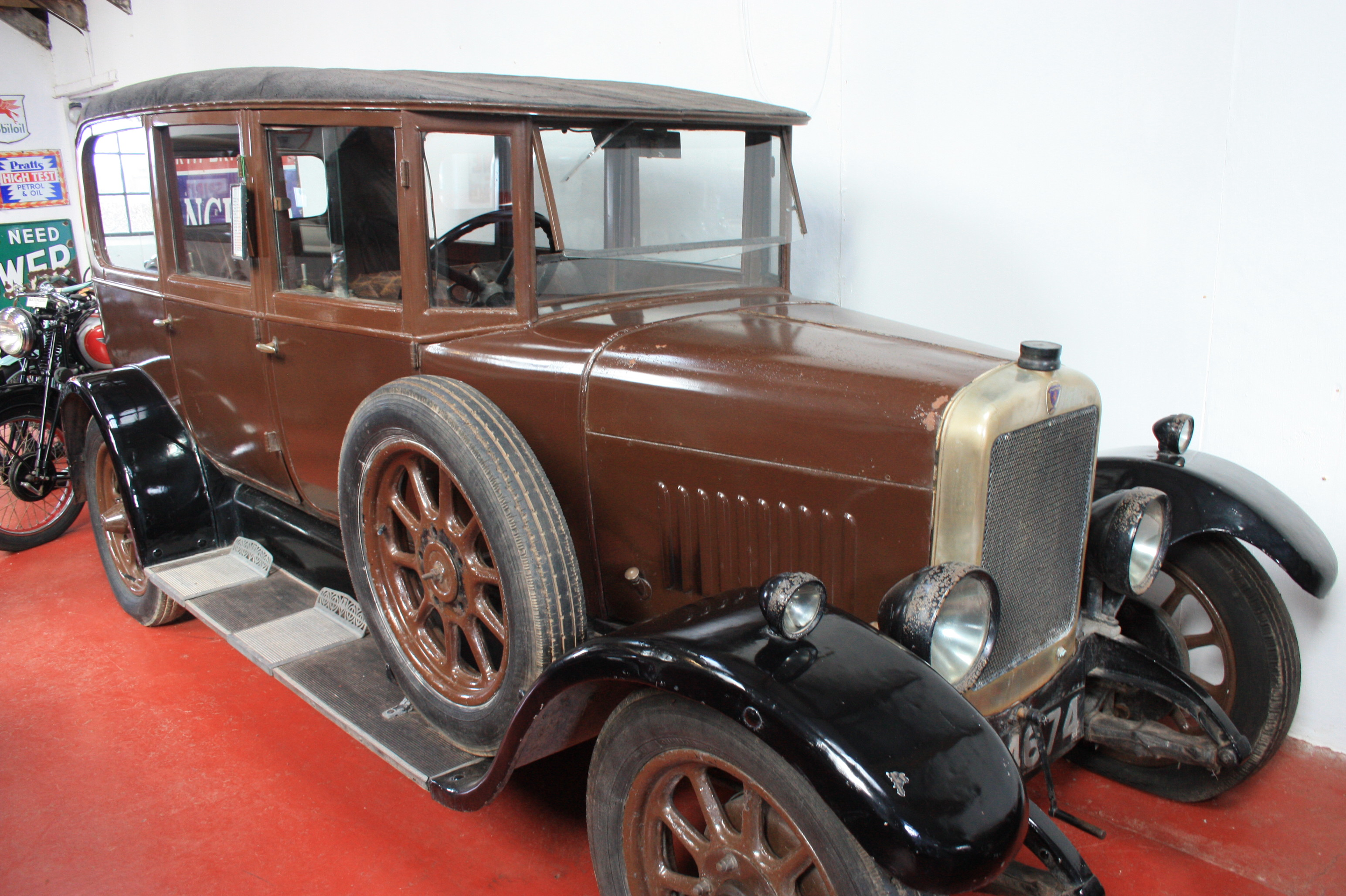
Dr Snoddie's 1927 Galloway

Location work for the original series was filmed in the town of Callander in Perthshire, although the first six episodes were filmed in Tannoch Drive, Milngavie, where the fictional Arden House was situated on the right-hand side as one approaches Tannoch Loch. The ducks and swans on that loch appear in the opening credits of the programme. The preceding shot is of the Red Bridge over the River Teith. Other outdoor scenes were filmed in Kilbarchan. Church Street in particular has changed little since filming took place.

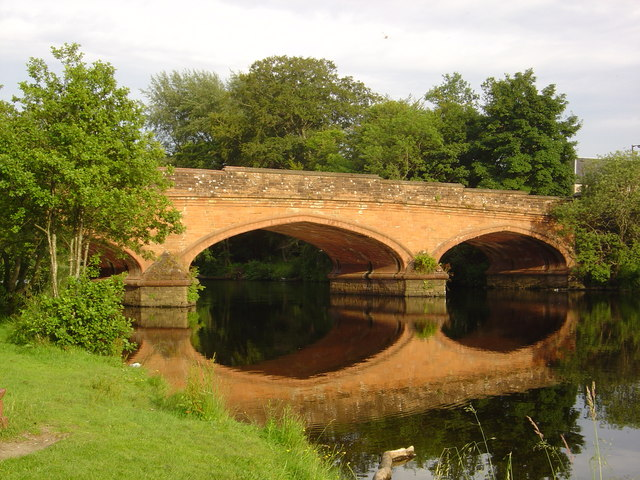
Red Bridge

In one of the first episodes Dr. Finlay (Bill Simpson) crashes his Bullnose Morris car into the wall of Arden House — which was not in the script. Another episode, filmed at night along Mugdock Road, finds the local policeman, somewhat inebriated, on his bicycle in a scene with Dr Snoddie. Episode 1 of series 8 was filmed in Kippen, Stirlingshire, using the local grocer's and butcher's shops, and also the school. The interior scenes were shot in BBC studios in London and Glasgow.

Uplawmoor railway station was temporarily renamed Tannochbrae in 1966 for one episode. BR Class J36 0-6-0 steam locomotive No 65345 was repainted at Thornton m.p.d. for use in the filming.

== Radio ==
From 1970 until 1978 episodes from Dr. Finlay's Casebook were broadcast on BBC Radio 4 with some of the actors from the television programme. These episodes were adapted for radio from the original television scripts by the original writers, where possible. Twenty episodes were broadcast on BBC 7 in the autumn of 2003.

In 2001 and 2002 BBC Radio 4 broadcast a version of the original Cronin stories using the titles The Adventures of a Black Bag and Doctor Finlay – Further Adventures of a Black Bag; these were been rebroadcast on BBC 7 and BBC Radio 4Extra. The adaptations were set in Levenford, the original setting chosen by Cronin, rather than Tannochbrae. The role of Dr. Finlay was played by John Gordon Sinclair. Dr Cameron was played by Brian Pettifer and Janet was played initially by Katy Murphy and then by Celia Imrie. David Tennant was a frequent guest actor.

In 1991 BBC Enterprises produced a double cassette copy of four of the radio broadcasts. (As of 13 November 2016 a copy of the cover is the profile picture on this listing.) The Four episodes are: Out of the Blue (TV episode Series 6 Broadcast 11 February 1968) (Radio episode 2 June 1970) The Comical Lad (TV episode Series 5 Broadcast 8 January 1967) (Radio episode 19 February 1973) The Honours List (TV episode Series 7 Broadcast 16 March 1969) (Radio episode 4 December 1973) Charlie is My Darling (TV episode Series 2 Broadcast 19 January 1964) (Radio episode 16 January 1975)

The television versions of all these episodes are recorded as missing as of 13 November 2016.

== Parody ==
The series has been parodied in a number of programmes, including an episode of Round the Horne set in "Stomachbrae", a play on the fictional TV setting of Tannochbrae. Although the original recording is thought to be lost, an off-air recording has been restored to broadcasting standard. A parody appears in an episode of The Men from The Ministry when they contact an expert on mice, Mr Finlay and his assistant Cameron. At the end of the scene the theme music to Dr. Finlay plays.

== Music ==
The programme's famous theme tune was Trevor Duncan's march from A Little Suite. The other two movements from the Suite were often used as background music. The characters from the series are featured in a song entitled Dr. Finlay by Andy Stewart, which was a minor Top 50 hit in 1965.

== DVD and archive status ==
Simply Media TV released the first series of Dr. Finlay's Casebook in March 2013 and the second series was released in April 2014. Only 10 episodes survive of the second series. The surviving episodes of series 3 and 4 were issued in 2015 and the remaining episodes of series 5, 6 & 7 were released in January 2016. The nine surviving episodes from series 8 were released in April 2016. Of the complete run of 191 episodes, 67 episodes survive and are on the DVDs, but 123 are believed to no longer exist and 1 exists incomplete.

== Controversies ==
Cronin received copies of the scripts and he wrote a blunt letter to the series' script editor in 1964, expressing his dissatisfaction with the progression of the show. Word leaked to the media, and in June 1964 stories appeared in the national press suggesting that the author wanted the series to end. One newspaper even accused the author of "maliciously doing millions out of legitimate enjoyment". The outcry from the viewing public was immediate, and sackfuls of mail were dispatched to Cronin's home in Switzerland. He issued a statement on 7 June to contest the charges made against him:

I have had hundreds of letters from viewers saying how sorry they were that the series was ending and that they were sorry that I was to blame. I don't like to disappoint anybody, but just lately the series has got out of line. The scripts have been getting ragged and introduced extraneous characters. If you overrun a programme, you end up with a soap opera. What annoys me is that the BBC have placed the whole onus of the row on me. I have written telling them it is a matter of improving scripts. I have no intention of stopping the series.

By the following year the series was a national institution. A Bill Simpson Fan Club was set up, Andy Stewart's Dr. Finlay was in the Hit Parade for five weeks, and Andrew Cruickshank was invited as a guest of honour at the British Medical Association's annual dinner to speak on medical matters as if he were a real GP.

Following the assassination of President Kennedy on 22 November 1963, the BBC screened Dr. Finlay's Casebook as part of its regular programming. There were reportedly over 2,000 phone calls and 500 letters and telegrams complaining about the decision.

== See also ==
- Dr. Finlay (about the fictional character)
- Doctor Finlay (about the follow-up television series, 1993–96)
