= Hans Peters =

Hans Peters is the first top prize winner of Lotto Weekend Miljonairs (the Dutch version of Who Wants to Be a Millionaire?).

He won on 6 January 2001. Because the euro wasn't used yet, he won NLG 1,000,000 instead of €1,000,000. The question that won him NLG 1,000,000 was, translated from Dutch: "Who designed the last series of the Dutch Gulden coins, as well as the Dutch side of the euro coins?", with these choices: Luk Luycks, Bruno N. van Eyben, Jaap Drupsteen and R.D.E. Oxenaar. The correct answer was Bruno N. van Eyben.

Preceded by First Millionaire	Top Prize Winner on Lotto Weekend Miljonairs; January 6, 2001	Succeeded by Henny
