= The Citadel (disambiguation) =

The Citadel is a public military college in Charleston, South Carolina.

The Citadel may also refer to:

== Arts, entertainment, and media ==
=== Film and television ===
- Adaptations of the Cronin novel
  - The Citadel (1938 film), a 1938 British film adaptation
  - The Citadel (1960 film), a 1960 American television film adaptation
  - The Citadel (1960 TV series), a 1960 British serial adaptation
  - The Citadel (1983 TV series), a 1983 British serial adaptation for the BBC
  - La Cittadella (1964 miniseries), a 1964 Italian adaptation of The Citadel
  - The Citadel (2003 miniseries) or La Cittadella, an Italian adaptation
- "The Citadel" (Star Wars: The Clone Wars)
- Citadel (TV series), a 2023 American spy action series starring Richard Madden and Priyanka Chopra made by Amazon

=== Literature ===
- The Citadel (novel), a 1937 novel by A. J. Cronin
- The Citadel, a novel by Peter Aleshkovsky
- The Citadel, a Dragonlance novel by Richard A. Knaak, in the Classics Series

=== Video games ===
- The Citadel, a Combine headquarters on Earth's City 17 in the game Half-Life 2
- The Citadel (Mass Effect), an immense space station and the heart of galactic civilization in the Mass Effect game series
- The Citadel, the headquarters of the Brotherhood of Steel in the ruins of the Pentagon in Fallout 3

== Places ==
=== Geography ===
- The Citadel (Arizona), an archaeological site at the Wupatki National Monument
- The Citadel (mountain), a mountain in South West Tasmania
- The Citadel (Sierra Nevada), a mountain summit in California

=== Structures and institutions ===
- Royal Citadel, Plymouth, regularly referred to as "The Citadel"
- Citadel of Aleppo, a palace in Aleppo, Syria
- The Citadel (mall), a shopping mall in Colorado, United States
- Citadel Outlets, an outlet mall in City of Commerce, Los Angeles County, California
- The Citadel, one of the tallest buildings in Dubai
- The Citadel, the Vietnamese royal residence at Hué
- The Citadel, 17th century artillery fort, Kingston upon Hull, UK
- Citadel Arts Centre, in St Helens, Merseyside now referred to as "The Citadel Arts Centre"
- Kastellet, Copenhagen, also called the Citadel, a 17th-century citadel in Copenhagen, Denmark
- The Citadel, York, church in England

== Sports ==
- The Citadel Bulldogs, the athletic programs of The Citadel college
- The Citadel, the name of English football ground Throstle Nest between 2019 and 2025

== See also ==
- Citadel (disambiguation)
- Citadella, fortress on Gellért Hill, Budapest, Hungary
- Citadelle (disambiguation)
- Cittadella (disambiguation)
- Royal Citadel (disambiguation)
- Tower of David (disambiguation)
