= Light music =

British musical style of "light" orchestral music

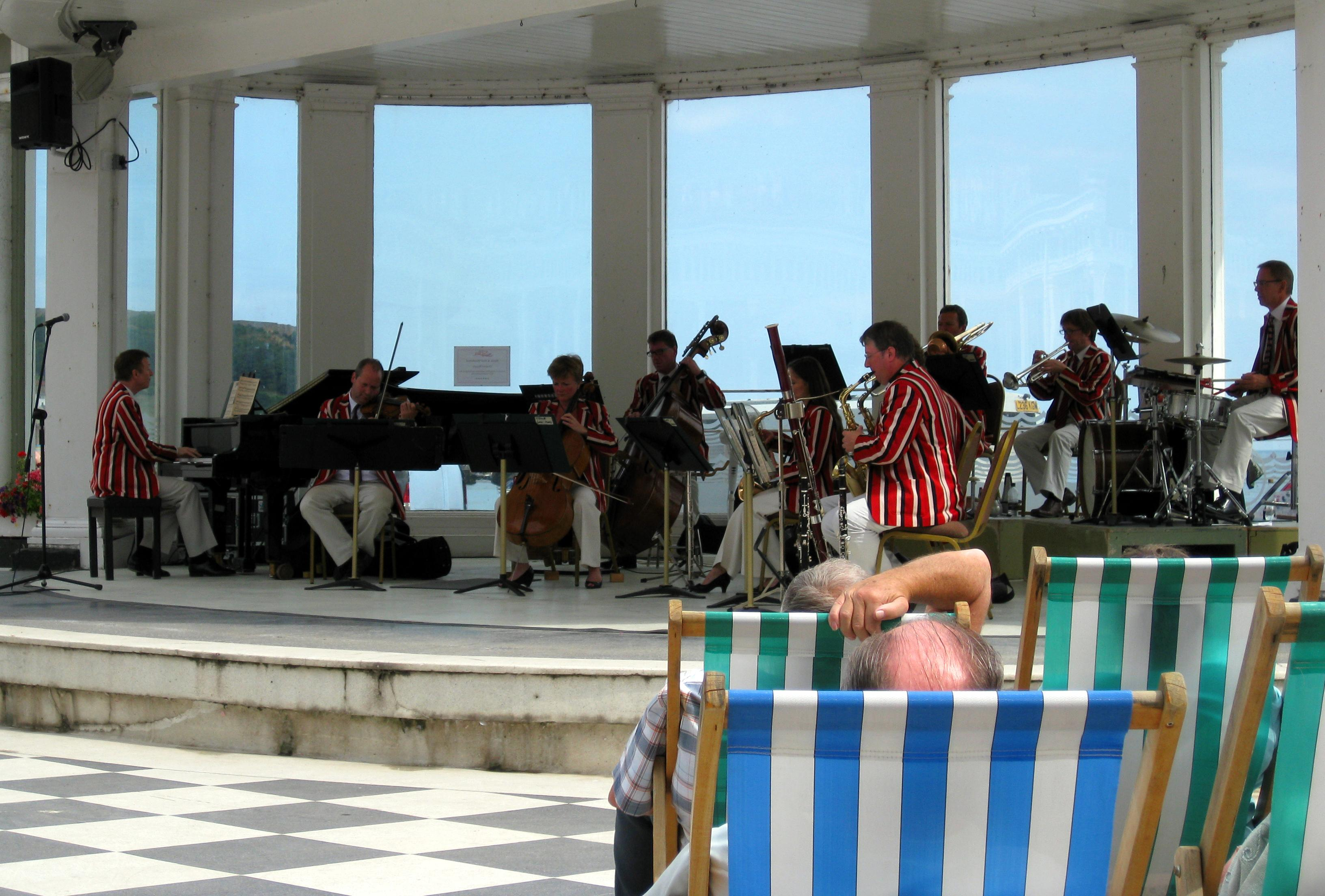
- The Scarborough Spa Orchestra, the last surviving professional seaside orchestra, giving a concert of light music in August 2009.
- Stylistic origins: Classical music
- Cultural origins: 18th–19th centuries
- Derivative forms: Easy listening; ambient music; exotica

Light music is a less-serious form of Western classical music, which originated in the 18th and 19th centuries and continues today. Its heyday was in the mid‑20th century. The style is through-composed, usually shorter orchestral pieces and suites designed to appeal to a wider context and audience than more sophisticated forms such as the concerto, the symphony and the opera.

Light music was especially popular during the formative years of radio broadcasting, with stations such as the BBC Light Programme (1945–1967) playing almost exclusively "light" compositions.

Occasionally also known as mood music and concert music, light music is often grouped with the easy listening genre. Light music was popular in the United Kingdom, the United States and in continental Europe, and many compositions in the genre remain familiar through their use as themes in film, radio and television series.

== Origins ==
Before Late Romantic orchestral trends of length and scope separated the trajectory of lighter orchestral works from the Western Classical canon, classical composers such as Mozart and Haydn won as much fame for writing lighter pieces such as Eine Kleine Nachtmusik as for their symphonies and operas. Later examples of early European light music include the operettas of composers such as Franz von Suppé or Sir Arthur Sullivan; the Continental salon and parlour music genres; and the waltzes and marches of Johann Strauss II and his family. The Straussian waltz became a common light music composition (note for example Charles Ancliffe's "Nights of Gladness" or Felix Godin's "Valse Septembre"). These influenced the foundation of a "lighter" tradition of classical music in the 19th and early 20th centuries.

In the UK, the light-music genre has its origin in the seaside and theatrical orchestras that flourished in Britain during the 19th and early 20th century. These played a wide repertoire of music, from classical music to arrangements of popular songs and ballads of the time. From this tradition came many specially written shorter orchestral pieces designed to appeal to a wider audience.

Composers such as Sir Edward Elgar wrote a number of popular works in this medium, such as the "Salut d'Amour", the Nursery Suite, and Chanson de Matin. The conductor Sir Thomas Beecham became famous for concluding his otherwise serious orchestral concerts with what he termed "lollipops", meaning less serious, short or amusing works chosen as a crowd-pleasing encore. Influenced by the earlier "promenade concerts" held in London pleasure gardens, a similar spirit embued many of Henry Wood's early Queen's Hall Proms concerts, especially the "Last Night of the Proms".

With the introduction of radio broadcasting by the BBC in the 1920s the style found an ideal outlet. This increased after the launch of the BBC Light Programme in 1945, featuring programmes such as Friday Night is Music Night and Music While You Work.

In the United States, "pops orchestra" such as the famous Boston Pops Orchestra began to emerge in the 19th century. The Boston Pops was founded in 1885 as a second, popular identity of the Boston Symphony Orchestra (BSO), founded four years earlier. They commissioned light pieces by composers such as Leroy Anderson, Ferde Grofé, and George Gershwin to write original works, along with theatre music, film music and arrangements of popular music and show tunes.

== Style ==
The cover of Eric Coates's autobiography, featuring a facsimile of a motif in his Knightsbridge March. Coates is often considered the "King of Light Music"

The British light music composer Ernest Tomlinson stated that the main distinction of light music is its emphasis on melody. This is certainly a major feature of the genre, although the creation of distinctive musical textures in scoring is another aim, for example the close harmony of Robert Farnon or Ronald Binge's "cascading string" effect, which later became associated with the "sustained hum of Mantovani's reverberated violins". Lyndon Jenkins describes the genre as "original orchestral pieces, often descriptive but in many cases simply three or four minutes of music with an arresting main theme and a contrasting middle section."

David Ades suggests that "it is generally agreed that it occupies a position between classical and popular music, yet its boundaries are often blurred". He goes on to cite broadcaster Denis Norden who said that light music was "not just tuneful round the outside, but tuneful right through."

Often, the pieces represent a mood, place, person or object, for example Farnon's "Portrait of a Flirt", Albert Ketèlbey's In a Monastery Garden or Edward White's "Runaway Rocking Horse". The genre's other popular title "mood music" is a reference to pieces such as Charles Williams' A Quiet Stroll, which is written at an andante pace and has a jaunty, cheery feel. Light music pieces are usually presented individually or as movements within a suite, and are often given individual descriptive titles. These titles can sometimes be unusual or idiosyncratic, such as Frederic Curzon's "Dance of the Ostracised Imp".

In keeping with this tradition of levity, pieces can also feature musical jokes at the expense of more "serious" works, such as Eric Fenby's overture Rossini on Ilkla Moor or Arthur Wilkinson's Beatlecracker Suite, which arranges songs by The Beatles in the style of Tchaikovsky's ballet The Nutcracker.

=== Associated genres ===
The genre is often associated with the easy listening orchestral arrangements of Mantovani, Percy Faith and Henry Mancini, although with the exception of Mancini these composers are better known for their arrangements rather than through-composed original compositions. As a result of this association, the music is sometimes linked to the genres of lounge music or Exotica, but light music generally does not feature vocals, synthesisers or popular music instruments.

It can also sometimes be grouped with the background music, beautiful music and elevator music created for commercial background music players such as the Seeburg 1000 by Seeburg Corporation or Cantata 700 (3M) as well as the works of Muzak Orchestra (Muzak as a company): back in the 1950s, the 1960s and the 1970s, the background music were light orchestral arrangements of popular music played in shops, hotels and airlines.

In Japan, "light music" is used to translate the Japanese term 軽音楽（Hepburn: keiongaku), also abbreviated "K-On" or "LM" in roman characters, which is a calque of the English term "light music" into Japanese that has been a broad term for non-classical popular music (e.g. jazz, rock) since the NHK began using the term in 1938.

== As film, radio and television themes ==
In the 1950s and 1960s many light composers wrote Production Library music for use in film, radio and television, and as a result, many light music compositions are familiar as theme music, an example being Trevor Duncan's March from a Little Suite, used by the BBC as the theme to Dr. Finlay's Casebook in the 1960s, or Edward White's "Puffin' Billy" being the theme to both the BBC radio series Children's Favourites and the CBS children's programme Captain Kangaroo.

Eric Coates' marches in particular were popular choices as theme music. The "Dambusters March", possibly his most famous work, was used as the title theme to the 1954 film and has become synonymous with the film and the mission itself. Other Coates works used as theme music include "Calling All Workers" for Music While You Work, "Knightsbridge" for In Town Tonight and "Halcyon Days" as the theme to The Forsyte Saga.

Coates was also commissioned to write original marches for television stations including the "BBC Television March", ATV's "Sound and Vision March" and Associated Rediffusion's "Music Everywhere". Other noteworthy television startup themes include William Walton's Granada Preludes, Call Signs and End Music for Granada Television, Robert Farnon's Derby Day for Radiotelevisão Portuguesa, Richard Addinsell's Southern Rhapsody for Southern Television, Ron Goodwin's Westward Ho! for Westward Television and John Dankworth's Widespread World for Rediffusion London.

Music for television test card transmissions was also a significant outlet for light music in the UK, from the mid-1950s into the 1980s. Several pieces of light music are used as themes on BBC Radio 4 to the present day, with Eric Coates's "By the Sleepy Lagoon" being the theme of Desert Island Discs, Arthur Wood's "Barwick Green" the theme of The Archers and Ronald Binge's "Sailing By" preceding the late-night shipping forecast.

== Decline and resurgence ==
During the 1960s, the style began to fall out of fashion on radio and television, forcing many light composers to refocus their energy on writing more serious works or music for film. Robert Farnon completed several symphonies in the later part of his life, as well as composing for television, for example Colditz. The light composers' skills of classical orchestration and arrangement were appreciated by composers such as John Williams, with both Angela Morley and Gordon Langford asked to help orchestrate his film scores for Star Wars (1977) and E.T. the Extra-Terrestrial (1982) amongst others.

Many orchestras specialising in playing light music were disbanded. Small palm court orchestras, once common in hotels, seaside resorts and theatres were gradually lost in favour of recorded music. The BBC began to discard its archive of light music, much of which was saved by composer Ernest Tomlinson and is now kept at his Library of Light Orchestral Music. However, the genre was kept in the public consciousness by its use in advertisements and television programmes, often used as a nostalgic evocation of the 1940s and 1950s.

During the 1990s, the genre began to be re-discovered and original remastered recordings by orchestras such as the Queen's Hall Light Orchestra were issued on compact disc for the first time. This was followed by new recordings of light music by orchestras such as the Royal Ballet Sinfonia, the New London Orchestra and the BBC Concert Orchestra, as well as continued public concerts by orchestras such as the Cambridge Concert Orchestra, the Scarborough Spa Orchestra and Vancouver Island's Palm Court Light Orchestra. The style also found a new home on BBC Radio 3 on Brian Kay's Light Programme, although this programme was discontinued in February 2007. In 2007, BBC Four broadcast an evening of light music as part of a themed evening celebrating British culture between 1945 and 1955, which included Brian Kay's documentary Music for Everybody and a televised version of Friday Night is Music Night.

In the UK, US and Canada, light music can still be heard on some of the radio channels that specialise in classical music: for example Classic FM in the UK, and XLNC1 in Mexico. A nationwide participatory festival of light music called "Light Fantastic" was organised by BBC Radio 3 in June 2011 as part of the 60th anniversary celebrations of the 1951 Festival of Britain. This included events in London, Manchester, Cardiff and Glasgow, from both professional and amateur ensembles, including a live revival of Music While You Work from a factory in Irlam near Manchester, several light music concerts from the Southbank Centre and a number of documentaries about the genre.

=== Thematic use ===
Light music is also frequently used as incidental music in radio and television programmes, for example Charles Williams' "Devil's Galop" (once famous as the theme to Dick Barton: Special Agent) is now often used in spoofs of 1950s action programmes, such as Mitchell and Webb's The Surprising Adventures of Sir Digby Chicken-Caesar sketches. Mitchell and Webb also use Acker Bilk's "Stranger on the Shore" as the theme music of their radio sketch show.

== Notable composers ==
There are hundreds of composers who can be considered to have written "light music", although composers who overall focussed primarily on lighter works include Charles Ancliffe, Ronald Binge, Eric Coates, Frederic Curzon, Trevor Duncan, Robert Farnon, Adalgiso Ferraris, Ron Goodwin, Heinz Kiessling, Albert Ketèlbey, Billy Mayerl, Angela Morley, King Palmer, Ernest Tomlinson, Sidney Torch, Edward White, Charles Williams, Alberto Semprini and Haydn Wood. Each of these composers worked during the "golden age" of light music from roughly 1920–1960.

== See also ==
- Palm court music
- Parlour music
- Soft rock
- Adult contemporary
- Sentimental ballad
- Background music
- Elevator music
  - Muzak company
- Easy listening
  - Beautiful music (also known as BM/EZ format)
