= Cittadella (disambiguation) =

Citadella is the fortification located upon the top of Gellért Hill in Budapest, Hungary.

Cittadella, the Italian word for citadel (meaning a castle, fortress, or fortified center), may also refer to:

== Fortifications ==
- Cittadella (Gozo), a walled city in Victoria, Gozo, Malta
- Cittadella, a medieval walled city in the province of Padua, Italy
- Cittadella of Alessandria, a star fort in Alessandria, Italy
- Cittadella Nuova, a fortress in Pisa, Italy
- Real Cittadella, a star fort in Messina, Sicily, Italy

== People ==
- Baldassare Cittadella, an Italian missionary

== Other uses ==
- A.S. Cittadella, an Italian football club
- Cittadella (Bari) railway station, a railway station in Bari, Italy
- La Cittadella (1964 miniseries), an Italian miniseries

== See also ==
- Citadel (disambiguation)
- Citadelle (disambiguation)
- The Citadel (disambiguation)
