= Angy =

Angy may refer to:

- Angy, Oise, a commune in France
- Kangy Angy, New South Wales, a suburb in Australia
- Angy Fernández (born 1990), Spanish singer
- Angy Palumbo (died 1960), Italian musician
- Angy Rivera, American activist

== See also ==
- Angela (given name)
- Angie (disambiguation)
