= Leon Young (musician) =

British arranger, conductor and musical director (1916–1991)

Leon Edward Stephen Young (21 April 1916 – 26 January 1991) was a British arranger, conductor and music director. His string orchestra, The Leon Young String Chorale, performed in many recording sessions from the 1950s to the 1970s, perhaps most famously on Acker Bilk's 1961 single "Stranger on the Shore".

== Early career ==
Young grew up in Rochester, Kent, and was first introduced to music by his family's involvement in the Salvation Army, his father playing cornet in the band. From 1930 he began taking piano lessons from Percy Whitlock, then assistant organist at Rochester Cathedral - until Whitlock moved on to Bournemouth. Young's family soon moved to Tonbridge and Leon Young was appointed as organist for the Baptist Church and conductor of the Co-op Choir. In November 1939 he married Grace Harvey.

== Wartime ==
When war was declared Young signed up as a Royal Marine bandsman. He was on board HMS Hermione when she was sunk by a German submarine on 16 June 1942. Eighty-eight crew members were killed, but Young was among those rescued by the destroyer Beaufort and taken to hospital in Alexandria. At the end of the war he was posted at the Royal Navy School of Music at Scarborough, where he arranged music for the official Naval show Tokyo Express, which opened at the Lyric Theatre, Hammersmith in June 1945.

== Arranger and session musician ==
After the war Young became a staff arranger at publishers Francis, Day & Hunter in London's Denmark Street, contributing arrangements for Tommy Handley's ITMA radio show and for the Royal Command Performance in 1948, and working with Petula Clark, and Max Bygraves early in their careers. In 1953 he made his breakthrough, arranging two pieces for Frank Chacksfield - Charlie Chaplin's Terry's Theme from "Limelight", and Ebb Tide - using a 40 piece orchestra with a large string section. The two Decca 78s helped establish Chacksfield's sound and both became major transatlantic hits, with Ebb Tide the first British instrumental to top the US charts. Chacksfield took most of the credit, however.

From the 1960s Young frequently worked with Denis Preston at the Lansdowne Studios, who encouraged him to form his own orchestra, The Leon Young String Chorale, for recording sessions. Artists who used the orchestra and Young as an arranger included Elaine Delmar, Bent Fabric and Roger Whittaker (on Durham Town). Most famously, Young arranged Stranger on the Shore for Acker Bilk, a massive hit in 1961. The tune was written on a single scrap of paper by Bilk and handed over to Young, who crafted the string arrangement, including the characteristic harmonic shifts at the very end. In 1964 the albums Ellington for Strings and Liverpool Sound for Strings were released by the Chorale with arrangements by Young.

== Final years ==
During the late 1960s and into the 1970s there were many BBC broadcasts with the BBC Radio Orchestra and a long association with Sidney Thompson. Young retired from Francis Day & Hunter in 1981, disillusioned by having to produce arrangements of current chart hits. He continued to be involved in local music in Tonbridge, and remained an active musician until ill-health stopped him in December 1989. Waiting for a train back to Tonbridge following a Salvation Army brass band concert at the Royal Festival Hall in January 1991, he collapsed and died on Platform C of Waterloo East Station.
