= Elizabeth Shepherd =

British actress

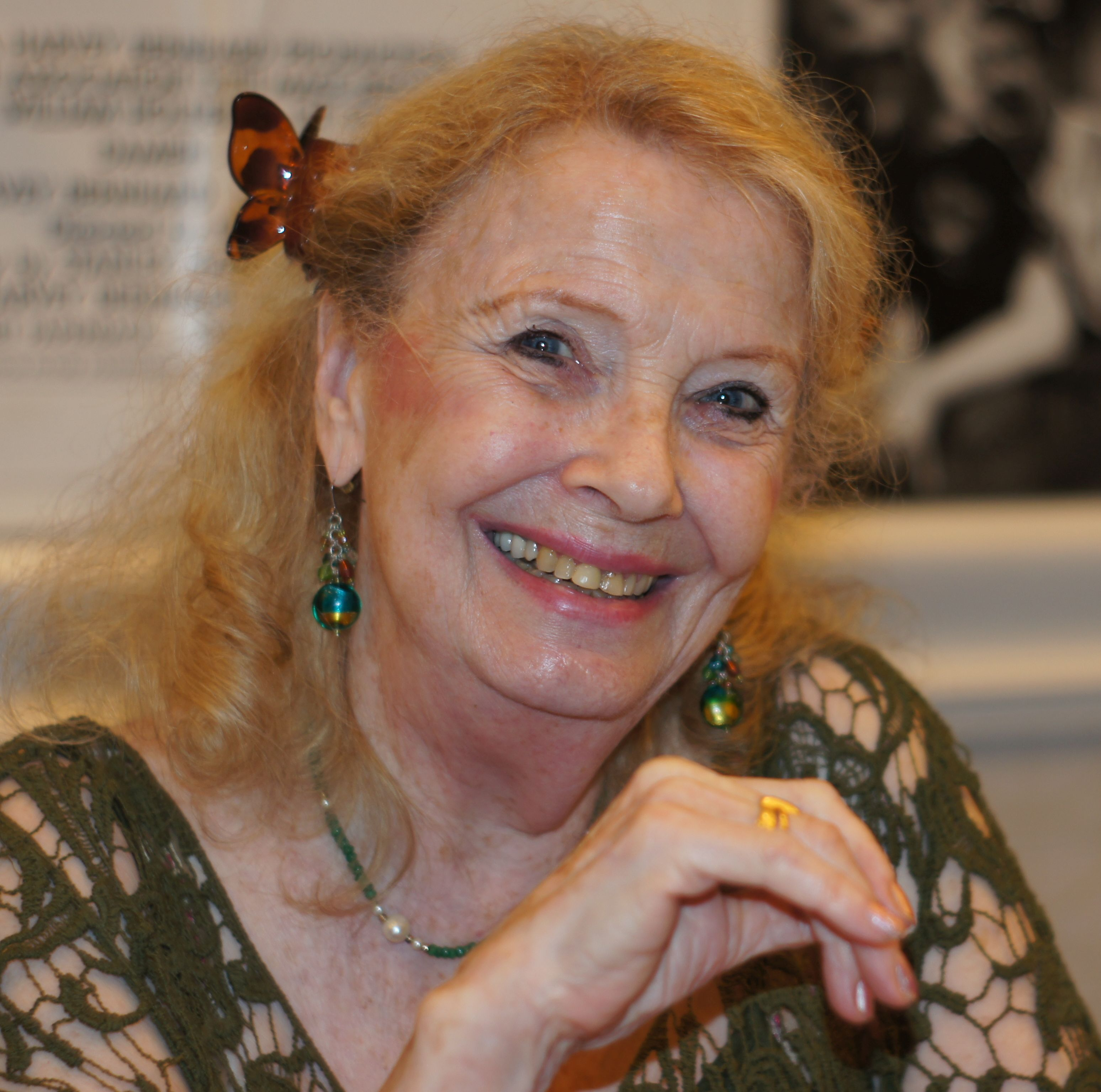
- Shepherd in 2019
- Born: 12 August 1936 (age 89); London, England
- Other names: Elizabeth Shephard, Elizabeth Sheppard
- Years active: 1959–present
- Spouse: John Ringham (m. 1959; div. 1962) Barry Boys (m. 1965)
- Website: Official website

Elizabeth Shepherd (born 12 August 1936) is an English character actress whose long career has encompassed the stage and both the big and small screens. Her television work has been especially prolific. Shepherd's surname has been variously rendered as "Shephard" and "Sheppard".

== Career ==
Shepherd began acting in television series in 1959. In 1960, she appeared in an adaptation of A. J. Cronin's novel, The Citadel. She was the original choice to play Emma Peel in the 1960s television series The Avengers. However, after filming nearly two episodes, Shepherd left the production and was replaced by Diana Rigg.

In 1970, she appeared on Broadway in Barry England's Conduct Unbecoming, a story of the British Army in Kipling's India, as Mrs Hasseltine. She was praised for her performance in Time magazine. Shepherd was pictured in Time along with her co-stars, the pop singers Jeremy Clyde and Paul Jones, who began their roles as British subalterns in London during 1969.

In film she appeared as both Lady Rowena and Ligeia in Roger Corman's The Tomb of Ligeia (1964), as well as in Damien - Omen II as the ill-fated reporter Joan Hart, The Kidnapping of the President, Deadly Companion and Amelia.

Her TV work includes the cult series The Corridor People (1966), the 1978 miniseries The Bastard, and The Cleopatras, a BBC historical drama.

Elizabeth Shepherd has acted in numerous stage plays in both Shakespearean and contemporary dramas. As well as teaching drama at the Stella Adler school, she starred in "December Fools" in 2006 at the Abingdon Theater in New York. In 2014, she starred in a Canadian production of Driving Miss Daisy.

An article in the Toronto Star reported an incident of Shepherd being a victim of identity theft and mortgage fraud in 2006.

In 2019, she released an audiobook of Edgar Allan Poe's Ligeia along with other Poe tales. The CD has been met with critical acclaim.

== Filmography ==
- The Queen's Guards (1961) - Susan
- What Every Woman Wants (1962) - Sue Goodwin
- Blind Corner (1964) - Joan Marshall
- The Tomb of Ligeia (1964) - The Lady Rowena Trevanion / The Lady Ligeia
- Hell Boats (1970) - Alison
- The Duchess of Duke Street (1976) - Series 1, episode 7 - Diana Strickland
- Damien - Omen II (1978) - Joan Hart
- Deadly Companion (1980) - Frances
- The Kidnapping of the President (1980) - Joan Scott
- Love (1982) - Mrs Wiseman (segment "Julia")
- Invitation to the Wedding (1985) - Lady Caroline
- Head Office (1985) - Mrs Issel
- Criminal Law (1988) - Dr Sybil Thiel
- Mustard Bath (1993) - Matthew's mother
- Time to Say Goodbye? (1997) - Teresa Rodriguez
- The White Raven (1998) - Hannah Rothschild
- The Spreading Ground (2000) - Mayor Hackett
- Desire (2000) - Mrs Waterson
- Amelia (2009) - Frances Putnam
- Northbound (2026) - Nursing Home Resident
