= Citadel Station =

Citadel Station may refer to:

== Stations ==
- Carlisle Citadel station, the original name of Carlisle railway station, England
- Leith Citadel railway station, a former station in Leith, Scotland

== Fiction ==
- Citadel Station, a space station orbiting Saturn in the video game System Shock
- Citadel, a space station in the Mass Effect video game series

== See also ==
- Citadel (disambiguation)
