= Richard Vernon =

English actor (1925–1997)

- Richard Vernon in Goldfinger (1964)
- Born: Richard Evelyn Vernon; 7 March 1925; Naivasha, Kenya Colony
- Died: 4 December 1997 (aged 72); Richmond upon Thames, London, England
- Education: Royal Central School of Speech and Drama
- Occupation: Actor
- Years active: 1949—1996

Richard Evelyn Vernon (7 March 1925 – 4 December 1997) was a British actor. He appeared in many feature films and television programmes, often in aristocratic or supercilious roles.

Prematurely balding and greying, Vernon settled into playing archetypal middle-aged lords and military types while still in his 30s. He played Slartibartfast in the radio adaptation and the TV adaptation of The Hitchhiker's Guide to the Galaxy, the lead role of Edwin Oldenshaw in The Man in Room 17 (1965–67), the mutton-chopped Major Smith-Barton in The Duchess of Duke Street (1976–77), Sir James Greenley alias "C" in The Sandbaggers (1978–80), and Sir Desmond Glazebrook in Yes Minister (1980–81) and its sequel series Yes, Prime Minister (1987).

== Early life ==
Vernon was born in Naivasha, Kenya to British parents in 1925. Vernon and his parents moved back to Britain in 1937, where he was educated at Reading School and Leighton Park School. During the Second World War, at the age of 18, he enlisted in the Royal Navy Volunteer Reserve and served during the final months of the war. After it ended, he was posted to Kowloon, where he directed and starred in a production of Heartbreak House. At the end of his service, his commanding officer reported "Vernon is an excellent dinghy helmsman and amateur actor: in his spare time he performs his duties satisfactorily."

He went on to train as an actor at the Central School of Speech and Drama.

== Career ==
In 1960, Vernon appeared in an adaptation of A.J. Cronin's novel, The Citadel. In 1961, he played the father in the BBC series, Stranger on the Shore. An early leading role was as wartime agent-turned-criminologist Edwin Oldenshaw in the TV series The Man in Room 17 (1965–66) and its sequel The Fellows (1967). He also played a small role as Colonel Smithers, an executive of the Bank of England, in a scene opposite Sean Connery and Bernard Lee in the 1964 James Bond film Goldfinger, discussing how Auric Goldfinger transports his gold overseas.

He played an unnamed 'city gent' reluctantly sharing a train compartment with the Beatles in A Hard Day's Night, planet designer Slartibartfast in both the BBC radio adaptation and the BBC TV series, of The Hitchhiker's Guide to the Galaxy, the occasional character Sir Desmond Glazebrook, a clueless senior banker, in the TV series Yes Minister and Yes, Prime Minister, and Mr Becket in Sammy's Super T-Shirt. He also appeared in the 1965 Morecambe and Wise film The Intelligence Men as patron of the arts Sir Edward Seabrook, Lord Bartelsham in Ripping Yarns, and Squire Dale in the BBC Radio 4 adaptation of The Small House at Allington. He played Admiral Croft in the 1971 BBC television adaptation of Persuasion. He played the urbane head of the Secret Intelligence Service Sir James Greenley in ITV political drama The Sandbaggers from 1978 to 1980. In 1986 he appeared in Paradise Postponed, and voiced the professor Gus in The Giddy Game Show (1985-7), in addition to a cameo role (as Professor Jerry Coe) in the video for Experiment IV by Kate Bush. He also appeared in the final episode of Thames Television's production of Rumpole of the Bailey (1992) as Rumpole's exculpatory dentist, Lionel Leering, and in the last series of Lovejoy (1994) playing Tinker's brother-in-law.

On radio, in 1978 he played Sir Gerald Tarrant in a BBC World Service adaptation of the Modesty Blaise book Last Day in Limbo and Professor Misty in the BBC Radio 3 sitcom Patterson in 1981. He also starred in the title role of Lord Emsworth in several BBC Radio 4 series of Blandings between 1985 and 1992.

In December 1990 he began teaching a course on stage acting in Harare, Zimbabwe. He moved back to England in January 1992. His final film appearance was an appearance at the end of the film Loch Ness, which was released in 1996.

== Personal life and death ==
In 1955 he married actress Benedicta Leigh née Hoskyns. They had a daughter Sarah, an actress (born 1956, died 2021) and a son Thomas (born 1958). They divorced in 1990.

Vernon died of complications from Parkinson's disease on 4 December 1997.

== Filmography ==
=== Film ===
- Stop Press Girl (1949) - (uncredited)
- Indiscreet (1958) - Guide (uncredited)
- The Heart of a Man (1959) - Manager (uncredited)
- The Siege of Pinchgut (1959) - Under-Secretary
- Sapphire (1960) - Detective
- Clue of the Twisted Candle (1960) - Viney
- Village of the Damned (1960) - Sir Edgar Hargraves
- Foxhole in Cairo (1960) - General
- Cash on Demand (1961) - Pearson
- The Edgar Wallace Mysteries Film series (1962, The Share Out) - John Crewe
- Reach for Glory (1962) - Dr. Aldrich
- Jigsaw (1962) - (voice)
- We Joined the Navy (1962) - (uncredited)
- The Edgar Wallace Mysteries Film series (1963, Accidental Death) - John Paxton
- Just for Fun (1963) - Prime Minister
- The Servant (1963) - Lord Mounset
- Hot Enough for June (1964) - Roddinghead
- A Hard Day's Night (1964) - Pompous man on train (Johnson)
- Goldfinger (1964) - Colonel Smithers
- The Counterfeit Constable (1964) (French title: Allez France!) - Lord Brisburn
- The Tomb of Ligeia (1964) - Dr. Vivian
- The Yellow Rolls-Royce (1965) - Racecourse official (uncredited)
- The Intelligence Men (1965) - Sir Edward Seabrook
- The Secret of My Success (1965) - Lord Hetherby
- The Early Bird (1965) - Sir Roger Wedgewood
- Goodbye, Mr. Chips (1969) - Chairman (uncredited)
- Song of Norway (1970) - Councilman
- She'll Follow You Anywhere (1971) - Andrew Coombes
- One Brief Summer (1971) - Hayward
- The Satanic Rites of Dracula (1973) - Mathews
- Adventures of a Taxi Driver (1976) - Gentleman (uncredited)
- The Pink Panther Strikes Again (1976) - Professor Hugo Fassbender
- Sammy's Super T-Shirt (1978) - Mr. Becket
- The Human Factor (1979) - Sir John Hargreaves
- Oh! Heavenly Dog (1980) - Quimby Charles
- The Box (1981) - (voice)
- Evil Under the Sun (1982) - Flewitt
- Witness for the Prosecution (1982) - Brogan-Moore, barrister
- Gandhi (1982) - Sir Edward Albert Gait
- Night Train to Murder (1983) - Uncle Felix
- Lady Jane (1986) - The Marquess of Winchester
- A Month in the Country (1987) - Colonel Hebron
- Loch Ness (1996) - Aged professor (cameo) (final film role)

=== Television ===
- ITV Television Playhouse (1956–1963, 5 episodes) as Multiple roles
- ITV Play of the Week (1957–1966, 9 episodes) as Multiple roles
- Probation Officer (1959–1960, 5 episodes) as Doctor Lessing
- No Hiding Place (1959–1961, 2 episodes) as John Eldin/Charles Lacey
- Dixon of Dock Green (1960–1962, 2 episodes) as Fellowes/Pascoe
- Emergency Ward 10 (1960, 1 episode) as Forrester
- Francis Storm Investigates (1960, 1 episode) as Commodore Garwood
- Deadline Midnight (1960, 1 episode) as Holroyd
- Boyd Q.C. (1960, 1 episode) as Mr. Trottman
- Theatre 70 (1960, 1 episode) as Mr. Pearson
- The Odd Man (1960, 5 episodes) as Charles Ormiston
- The Citadel (1960, 5 episodes) as Doctor Ivory
- Jango (1961, 1 episode) as Parkinson
- Stranger on the Shore (1961, 6 episodes) as David Gough
- Stranger in the City (1962, 6 episodes) as David Gough
- The Cheaters (1962, 1 episode) as Ken Northwood
- Saki (1962, 8 episodes) as The Major
- Maigret (1962, 1 episode) as Philippe
- The Last Man Out (1962, 1 episode) as The Colonel
- The Avengers (1962, 1 episode) as Lord Matterley
- Harpers West One (1962, 1 episode) as Arthur Purvis
- Z-Cars (1962, 1 episode) as Det. Chief Insp. Humphries
- It Happened Like This (1963, 1 episode) as Harker
- 24-Hour Call (1963, 1 episode) as Wing Commander Battenby
- Walter and Connie (1963, 1 episode) as Mr. Johns
- The Saint (1963, 1 episode) as Sir John Ripwell
- The Plane Makers (1963, 2 episodes) as Keith Saville
- Crane (1964, 1 episode) as Wolsey
- The Hidden Truth (1964, 1 episode) as William Anstruthe
- Here's Harry (1964, 1 episode) as Self
- The Marriage Lines (1964, 1 episode) as Mr. Renfrew-Smith
- The Man in Room 17 (1965–1966, 26 episodes) as Edwin Oldenshaw
- The Fellows (1967, 13 episodes) as Edwin Oldenshaw
- ITV Playhouse (1967–1970, 3 episodes) as Multiple roles
- Comedy Playhouse (1968, 1 episode) as Sir Reginald Polk-Mowbray
- Mystery and Imagination (1968, 1 episode) as Professor Krempe
- Harry Worth (1968, 1 episode) as Mr. Gilmore
- The Man in Room 17 (1968–1972, 3 episodes) as Multiple roles
- Thirty-Minute Theatre (1968, 1 episode) as Colonel O'Dwyer
- Journey to the Unknown (1969, 1 episode) as Sir Gerald Walters
- Department S (1969, 1 episode) as Colonel Loring
- W. Somerset Maugham (1969, 1 episode) as Lord Kastellan
- Fraud Squad (1970, 1 episode) as Sir Roy Prentiss
- Biography (1970, 1 episode) as Tycho Brahe
- UFO (1971, 1 episode) as Stone
- Seasons of the Year (1971, 1 episode) as Lord Rudge
- Paul Temple (1971, 1 episode) as Carlton
- The Mind of Mr. J.G. Reeder (1971, 1 episode) as Major Olbude
- Brett (1971, 1 episode) as Sutherland
- Albert and Victoria (1971, 1 episode) as Mr. Ridley
- The Persuaders! (1971, 1 episode) as Sir Maxwell Dean
- The Guardians (1971, 1 episode) as Face
- Hadleigh (1971–1976, 3 episodes) as Sir Geoffrey Osborne
- Persuasion (1971, 5 episodes) as Admiral Croft
- The Adventurer (1972, 1 episode) as Sir Richard McKenzie
- Softly, Softly: Task Force (1972, 1 episode) as Sir Ralph Townley
- The Sextet (1972, 8 episodes) as Multiple roles
- Man at the Top (1972, 2 episodes) as Lord Belmont
- Between the Wars (1973, 1 episode) as Morton
- Late Night Theatre (1973, 1 episode) as Morry Sheldon
- Special Branch (1973, 1 episode) as Townsend
- Upstairs, Downstairs (1973, 2 episodes) as Major Cochrane-Danby
- Harriet's Back in Town (1973, 6 episodes) as Oliver Warburton
- Dolly (1973, 2 episodes) as Mr. Hilary Musgrave
- Dial M for Murder (1974, 1 episode) as The Chief
- Justice (1974, 1 episode) as Lord Tilling
- Thriller (1974, 1 episode) as George Cornfield
- Village Hall (1974, 1 episode) as Cedric Wellbeloved
- Affairs of the Heart (1974, 1 episode) as Colonel Chart
- Edward the Seventh (1975, 3 episodes) as Lord Salisbury
- Dawson's Weekly (1975, 1 episode) as Solicitor
- The Duchess of Duke Street (1976–1977, 18 episodes) as Major Smith-Barton
- Ripping Yarns (1976, 1 episode) as Lord Bartlesham
- The Cedar Tree (1977, 2 episodes) as Lord Evelyn Forbes
- Do You Remember? (1978, 1 episode) as Lord Greenham
- The Sandbaggers (1978–1980, 12 episodes) as Sir James Greenley / "C"
- Yes Minister (1980–1981, 2 episodes) as Sir Desmond Glazebrook
- Bognor (1981, 6 episodes) as Lord Wharfedale
- Roger Doesn't Live Here Anymore (1981, 1 episode) as Judge
- The Hitchhiker's Guide to the Galaxy (1981, 2 episodes) as Slartibartfast
- Legacy of Murder (1982, 6 episodes) as Roland Tolhurst
- L for Lester (1982, 5 episodes) as Mr. Davies
- Something in Disguise (1982, 5 episodes) as Herbert Browne-Lacey
- Strangers (1982, 1 episode) as Sir Geoffrey
- Nanny (1982, 6 episodes) as Duke of Broughton
- The Boy Who Won the Pools (1983, 2 episodes) as Sir Malvern West
- Pig in the Middle (1983, 1 episode) as Lord Gathorne
- Leaving (1984, 6 episodes) as Mr. Chessington
- Roll Over Beethoven (1985, 13 episodes) as Oliver Purcell
- Summer Season (1985, 1 episode) as Thompson
- Ladies in Charge (1986, 1 episode) as Lord Brampton
- Lytton's Diary (1986, 1 episode) as Duncan Anderson
- Paradise Postponed (1986, 9 episodes) as Sir Nicholas Fanner
- Chance in a Million (1986, 1 episode) as Uncle Evelyn
- The Return of the Antelope (1986–1988, 13 episodes) as Mr. Garstanton
- Last of the Summer Wine (1987, 1 episode) as The Vicar
- Yes, Prime Minister (1987, 1 episode) as Sir Desmond Glazebrook
- Hot Metal (1988, 1 episode) as Lord Gilbert
- A Gentleman's Club (1988, 6 episodes) as George
- Casualty (1988, 1 episode) as Dr. Richard Payton
- Helping Henry (1988, 6 episodes) as Cosmic 1
- The Storyteller (1988, 1 episode) as King
- About Face (1989, 1 episode) as Bingham
- KYTV (1992, 1 episode) as Chester Chuckles
- The Camomile Lawn (1992, 2 episodes) as General Peachum
- Rumpole of the Bailey (1992, 1 episode) as Lionel Leering
- Bonjour la Classe (1993, 1 episode) as Sir Lionel
- You Rang, M'Lord? (1993, 1 episode) as The Earl of Swaffham
- The Return of the Borrowers (1993, 3 episodes) as Mr. Pott
- Rides (1993, 1 episode) as Arthur Copthorne
- Frank Stubbs Promotes (1994, 1 episode) as Lord Dunstable
- Lovejoy (1994, 1 episode) as Roger Nettleton
- Class Act (1994–1995, 14 episodes) as Sir Horace Mainwaring
