= Puffing Billy =

Puffing Billy may refer to:

- Puffing Billy (locomotive), an early steam locomotive
- Puffing Billy Railway, a narrow-gauge heritage tourist railway near Melbourne, Australia
- Puffing Billy Tournament, a board game convention focusing on train games
- Puffin' Billy, a piece of light music by Edward White
- Puffing Billy, military jargon for the M67 immersion heater
- Puffing Billy, a vacuum cleaner constructed by Hubert Cecil Booth
