= Archibald Joyce =

English composer and bandleader (1873–1963)

- Joyce ca. 1920
- Born: Arthur Joyce; 25 May 1873; Belgravia, London, UK
- Died: 22 March 1963 (aged 89); England
- Spouse: Florence Mary Latter (m. 1919)

Archibald Joyce (25 May 1873 – 22 March 1963), born Arthur Joyce, was an English light music composer and bandleader of the early 20th century. He is known for his popular short waltzes for dancing, such as Dreaming, Songe d'Automne (Dream of Autumn) and Vision of Salome. His waltzes were part of the White Star Line's orchestra repertoire, and likely played on the fatal maiden voyage of Titanic.

== Life ==
Arthur Joyce was born in London in May 1873 at 68 Winchester Street, Pimlico. His father was in the Grenadier Guards as a band sergeant. He showed his musical abilities early, singing in a church choir in Paddington and learning violin and piano. His first known composition, completed at the age of 11, was a march that was performed several times by the conductor Dan Godfrey (in his pre-Bournemouth bandmaster days). He began his professional career as a pianist at London's Oxford Music Hall in the 1890s but soon also started playing for the ballet, most notably the company run by Katti Lanner at the Empire Theatre of Varieties in Leicester Square with Madame Genée as its leading ballerina.

Adopting the stage name of Archibald Joyce, he played on transatlantic liners, in music halls and in the theatre. In 1903 he was musical director of Mistress-of-the-Robes at the Royal Court Theatre and Opera House in Liverpool starring Ellen Terry. (He later toured with Terry, in 1909-1910). But he soon formed the Archibald Joyce Dance Orchestra, employing up to 100 players depending on the venue (which ranged from seaside pavilions to dance halls, great houses, aristocratic balls and "coming out" dances during the London season) and its popularity quickly precluded other work. He began composing to expand the repertoire of his orchestra.

Joyce has been credited as conducting "the first modern dance band in Britain". Its fame extended to Europe and America. He recorded for the Gramophone Company HMV-label in London as early as 1912, and from the early 1920s his orchestras recorded material for the Aeolian Company's Vocalion Records label. The heyday of his band was in the pre-war and immediate post war periods, although he continued conducting and recording with his own ensembles throughout the 1920s and his music becoming a staple for dance-medley records as the gramophone industry evolved.

Joyce married Florence Mary Latter in 1919 and there was one adopted daughter, Maisie Parkinson. At the height of his fame he was living on Clapham Common in London. He moved to Bexhill-on-Sea in 1927, and then to Sutton in Surrey from 1932, at 75 Langley Park Road. He died there in 1963, at the age of 89, his life just overlapping with The Beatles. In the 1990s Philip Lane helped lead a revival of interest in Joyce with a radio documentary, The English Waltz King, also providing new arrangements of his music for a Marco Polo recording (re-issued on Naxos in 2022).

== Music ==
Joyce's first published piece, a two-step called The Moke's Parade (1905), did not become popular. His first waltz, Chanson de mon Cœur, was published in 1907. But the first to attract any attention was the waltz Sweet Memories in 1908. That same year, his waltz Songe d'Automne (Dream of Autumn in English), originally written for piano, became a best-seller. Vision of Salome Valse also written for piano, followed in 1909. His 1911 waltz Dreaming became an international success and remains his best remembered work.

Other early waltzes include Remembrance, Boating, À jamais, and Vision d'Amour in 1909, and Love and Life in Holland and A Thousand Kisses in 1910. Joyce's early two-steps include I'll Dance till de Sun Breaks Thro' and Mickey's Birthday (or An Irish Stew), both written in 1909.

The waltz Dreaming of 1911 was one of the first examples of the 'hesitation' waltz craze, and remained Joyce's most famous composition, selling one and a quarter million copies of the sheet music between 1911 and 1920. Many different recordings exist. Other highly successful waltzes quickly followed, including When the Birds Began to Sing in 1911, Charming and Passing of Salome in 1912, Always Gay and Maiden's Blush in 1913, Entrancing in 1914, and Love's Mystery in 1915. Salome was a common topic of Joyce's work, and he wrote four waltzes on the subject; Vision of Salome in 1909, Passing of Salome in 1912, Reincarnation (subtitled Salome) in 1919, and Phantom of Salome in 1945.

His marches include The Palace Guard, Royal Standard, American March, Hiking to Brighton, Ceremonial March Britannica, Wedding Bells and Prince of Wales. The three-movement suite of oriental miniatures, Caravan, was composed in 1926. Songs by Joyce include I’m Skipper of a Submarine, God’s Greatest Gift, The Rogue of the Road, Awake, The Morning Light, Dreams of Bohemia, Friends Dear to Me and The Modern Girl.

In 1916 Joyce co-wrote the musical Toto with Merlin Morgan (musical director of Daly's Theatre in London). After a try-out in Plymouth it opened at London's Duke of York's Theatre on 19 April. Despite good initial reviews it did not take off and was withdrawn after only 77 performances. A second foray into musical theatre came in 1921 with Gabrielle, co-written with George H. Clutsam, which successfully toured the provinces.

Joyce mostly did not follow contemporaries such as Eric Coates, Albert Ketèlbey and Haydn Wood into the fields of light concert music for listening, or broadcasting and library music. His music remained primarily for dancing. The waltzes he composed stuck strictly to the form, with lots of repeated sections demanded by the dancers. Although his style remained static across his entire career, Joyce kept composing into the 1940s and beyond, often for Oxford and Cambridge university balls. In 1942, he wrote the waltz Bohemia. Song of the River came out in 1946 and was broadcast by the BBC. His last published piece was Recruits on Parade, which appeared in 1951.

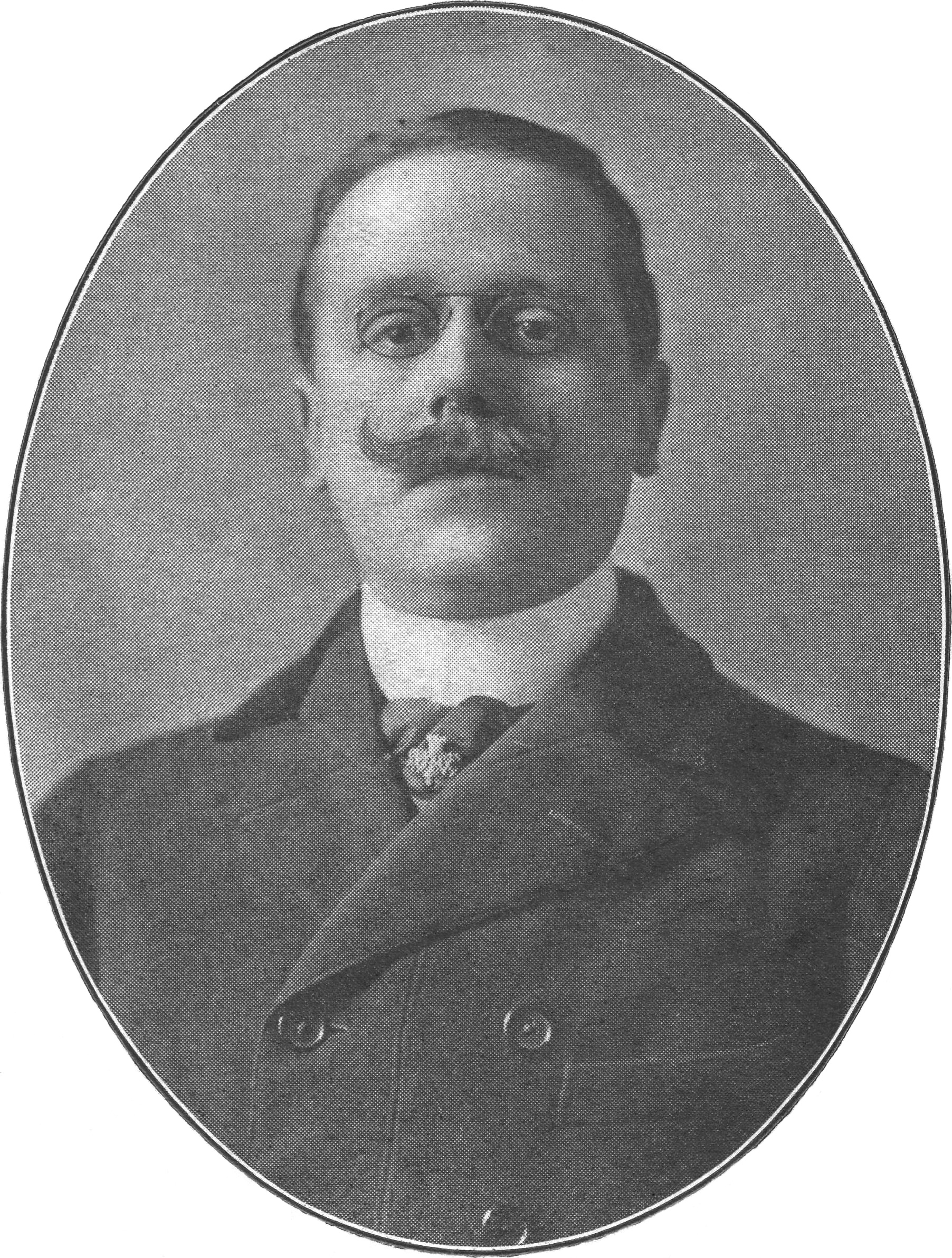
Joyce near the height of his career ca. 1909

== Inspiration and influence ==
Although billed by his publishers (Ascherberg, Hopwood & Crew) as "The English Waltz King", the implied comparison with Johann Strauss II is not valid, according to Jason Tomes. Instead Joyce was more directly inspired by Franz Lehár and Leo Fall, particularly by the waltz duet from the second act of Lehár's The Merry Widow, which opened at Daly's Theatre in London on 8 June 1907 and was extraordinarily popular, running for 778 performances. Other contemporary examples of the English light waltz include Destiny by Sydney Baynes and Nights of Gladness by Charles Ancliffe, both 1912.

His music was taken up by other dance orchestras (Alfredo Campoli, Debroy Somers and others) and by amateur pianists. It also became familiar worldwide through its inclusion in musical revues and films. Dreaming was given lyrics by Earl Carroll and introduced in the US by Miss Kitty Gordon in Oliver Morosco's comedy with music, Pretty Mrs Smith (1913). In the US a conventional method of gaining public exposure for a song was to arrange to have it included in a revue: in this way Vision of Salome (1909) was included in Florenz Ziegfeld Jr.'s Follies of 1910. Songe d'Automne and A Thousand Kisses were incorporated into Charlie Chaplin's latter-day soundtrack added to his The Gold Rush in 1925. In 1948 film composer Benjamin Frankel included Dreaming as part of his score for Trottie True, evoking the Edwardian period in which the film is set.

Joyce disliked jazz, avoiding the syncopation and saxophones favoured by the younger generation of dance hall composers. His ensemble was among the first generation of dance orchestras, soon to lose ground to brass and saxophone-dominated bands.

== RMS Titanic ==
It is likely that passengers heard Joyce's compositions played during their time aboard RMS Titanic in April 1912. In fact, the White Star Line Repertoire book (which the orchestra members were required to memorize) contained several works by Joyce: Passing of Salome, A Thousand Kisses, Dreaming, Sweet Memories, Boating, Vision d'Amour, Love and Life in Holland, Vision of Salome, Songe d'Automne, and Remembrance. Junior Wireless Operator Harold Bride claimed the orchestra aboard Titanic played "Autumn" as it sank. This has led to speculation that Bride was referring to Songe d'Automne, which was part of the orchestra's repertoire.

A theory has arisen that the last song played was indeed Songe d'Automne, and that the survivors misinterpreted it as "Nearer, my God, to Thee". This is because both songs begin with the same three notes.
