= Felix Godin =

English composer

Felix Godin, a pseudonym of Henry Albert Brown (c. 1864 – 1925), was an English composer of light music. He is best known for his elegiac Valse Septembre, a light waltz written in 1909.

The waltz, which is composed in four movements, begins slow with the first melody, then after being repeated once opens into the upbeat main melody, followed by a slower third movement, and then repeating the first melody, following with a brief fourth melody, then concludes repeating the previous melodies with a finale.

The waltz was popular in the early 20th century; however, it virtually disappeared from the public eye for the latter half of the century. The waltz however regained some interest when it was featured several times in the 1997 film Titanic.
