= Pasquale Troise =

Italian English bandleader (1895–1957)

Pasquale Troise (c. 1895 – 21 March 1957) was a popular bandleader, arranger and composer, active in England from the 1920s until his death in 1957. Born in Minori, a small fishing village near Sorrento, Troise started playing the clarinet in the village band from the age of seven, then took up the mandolin, aged 12. Moving to London in the early 1920s he joined the London Radio Dance Band, performed in some early radio broadcasts with 2LO, and made his first stage appearance at the Plaza Theatre, Haymarket in 1932. With help from Colin Wark he formed his own band, initially known as Troise and his Mandoliers and later Troise and his Banjoliers. The classic instrumentation was piano, bass, drums, accordion and eight different sizes of banjo. Angy Palumbo was among its members. There is footage of Troise and his band performing in the British musical film Sunshine Ahead (1936). Troise secured a recording contract with Decca, and toured the country with his band.

In September 1940 the band (initially as the Mandoliers) made its first appearance on the long-running BBC radio series Music While You Work. As the Banjoliers they became the most used band in the series, with over 470 appearances. On the death of Pasquale Troise in 1957, the BBC negotiated with Mrs Troise to enable the Banjoliers to continue under the direction of conductor Jack Mandel, with use of the band's established music library. Under Mandel the band went on to perform in another 217 programmes until the show was discontinued in 1967. Its final performance was for the 60th anniversary celebration of Music While You Work in 1982.

Frederic Curzon was a friend and dedicated his orchestral piece Capricante (1949) to Troise. From the 1930s Troise was living at Rochester Terrace, Camden Town. He died at his home in Bromwich Avenue, Highgate, aged 62, survived by his wife Louisa.
