= The View from Daniel Pike =

Scottish TV drama (1971–1973)

- Genre: Drama
- Written by: Edward Boyd
- Starring: Roddy McMillan
- Country of origin: Scotland
- Original language: English
- No. of series: 2
- No. of episodes: 13

Original release
- Network: BBC 2
- Release: 25 November 1971 – 25 February 1973

The View from Daniel Pike is a Scottish television drama series that aired in the early 1970s, which starred Roddy McMillan as the eponymous title character, a hard-boiled private detective based in Glasgow, and was written by Edward Boyd. Some of the stories were adapted into book form.
