= Edward Boyd (writer) =

British television writer (1916–1989)

- Born: 1916; Stevenston, North Ayrshire, Scotland
- Died: 17 December 1989 (aged 72–73)
- Occupation: Writer

Edward Boyd (1916 – 17 December 1989) was a Scottish writer best known for his television and radio work.

He worked with the Glasgow Unity Theatre in the 1940s. Later he moved into radio and TV. In the 1960s he created series such as The Odd Man and The Corridor People (as Eddie Boyd) for Granada TV, and wrote for a number of shows including Z-Cars on the BBC. His radio serial thriller The Same River Twice (also as Eddie Boyd) was first broadcast in eight parts on the BBC Light Programme in 1966, with Gordon Jackson as Johnny Maxen, Lennox Milne as Helen Duncan, and Roddy McMillan as D.I. Wardlaw. It was adapted for television the same year, under the title The Dark Number, and shown on BBC2 in five parts, starting on 29 December 1966. Patrick Allen played Johnny, Madeleine Christie played Helen, and Roddy McMillan reprised his role of Wardlaw from the radio version. Boyd, in collaboration with Roger Parkes, turned it into a book under this title in 1973.

In the 1970s, he wrote the BBC series The View From Daniel Pike, again starring Roddy McMillan, this time as a dour private detective.

In 1986, Boyd wrote the play Castles in Spain, which was broadcast as a five-part serial on BBC Radio 4 in 1987.

Boyd's papers, including some scripts that can be read online, are held by the University of Glasgow.
