= Charles Ancliffe =

Irish composer (1880–1952)

Charles William Ancliffe (25 July 1880 – 20 December 1952) was an Irish-born composer of light music, chiefly remembered for his salon piano music, genre dance pieces, light character pieces and his "Nights of Gladness" waltz.

== Early life and education ==
Ancliffe was born on 25 July 1880 at Curragh Camp, Kildare, Ireland. His father, John Benjamin Ancliffe (1854–1916), was bandmaster of the 2nd Battalion Suffolk Regiment from 1884 and the 2nd Battalion Somerset Light Infantry from 1894 until he was discharged in 1908.

When aged 11, he was organist at the military church in Secunderabad where his father was stationed. At the age of 15 in 1896 he joined the 2nd Battalion of the Somerset Light Infantry in Guernsey as a boy bandsman. He studied at the Royal Military School of Music in Kneller Hall (1899–1900), graduating at the age of 20 having been awarded the gold baton for composition for a suite called "Gipsy Pictures".

== Career ==
Ancliffe followed in his father's footsteps by becoming a bandmaster himself; from 11 December 1900 he was bandmaster of the First Battalion, South Wales Borderers, seeing much service in India (1901–1910). In 1902 he joined the Freemasons. In 1903, when he was 23, he conducted the massed bands at King Edward VII's Delhi Durbar. (Note: Mr Charles Ancliffe, composer of 400 or more gay tunes, who collapsed and died after alighting from a 'bus in George-street, Richmond, on Saturday, had suffered from heart trouble for many years. He had lived at 5, Poulett-gardens, Twickenham, since 1940. His greatest success was the waltz, "Nights of Gladness," of which over two million copies have been sold. It is now being broadcast every Tuesday evening as the signature tune of the Light Programme feature of that title in tribute to musical comedy and operetta composers of the past twenty-five years. Another waltz of his to rival "night of Gladness" in popularity is "Thrills." He composed "Take Your Partners" specially for Sydney Thompson's old-time dance feature, also broadcast in the Light Programme. He used to say that not a day passed without one of his compositions being broadcast. He will always be remembered in Twickenham as the composer of "Twickenham Fair." Mr A W Woodward, who wrote the words, told the "Richmond and Twickenham Times" that within eight days of Mr Ancliffe offering to write a tune for the fair it was being sung at a children's matinee at the Odeon Cinema. That was in the second year of the borough fair. Mr. Ancliffe was 72 when he died. A graduate of Kneller Hall, he passed out at the age of 20 and was the youngest man ever to be appointed bandmaster in the British Army. He was band-master of the 1st Battalion, South Wales Borderers, and in 1903, when he was 23, he conducted the massed bands at King Edward VII's Delhi Durbar. While at Kneller Hall he was awarded a gold baton the best composts by a student of his year. It was a suite called "Gipsy Pictures," and is often played today. In the summer of last year, at the, request of Sydney Thompson, he composed five new tunes for old-time dances, the results being published, with "Take Your Partners," in "Sydney Thompson's Old-Time Dance Album." His last appointment was as director of the Scarborough municipal orchestra, which he held from 1924 to 1927. Since then he had concentrated on composing. His last composition was "Dream of the Danube," which he dedicated to his grandson, Simon Harding, who is just six and was very fond of his grandfather. Mr. Ancliffe leaves a widow and two daughters, Mrs. Joan Harding, Simon’s mother and Mrs. Kathleen Norris. The funeral was on Tuesday at Mortlake crematorium.) In August 1914 he joined the 3rd (Reserve) Battalion South Wales Borderers with the rank of Bandmaster, was awarded the Long Service and Good Conduct medal in 1914, and was discharged on 10 December 1918.

During this period he wrote many popular pieces of music including marches such as "The Liberators", and "Castles in Spain". He also composed dozens of short genre pieces, often styled 'intermezzo' or 'entr'acte', several songs and ingeniously titled suites such as Below Bridges which included titles "Wapping Old Stairs, Poplar" and "Stepney Church", all London bridges.

Around the time of the First World War Ancliffe composed many waltzes and light character solo pieces, and it is mainly for these that he is remembered. These included "Nights of Gladness Waltz", "Thrills Waltz", "Secrets Waltz", the titles reflecting the age in which they were written. These enjoyed renewed popularity with the fashion for ‘olde-tyme dancing’ after World War II. He also composed under the pseudonym Louis Severne.

=== "Nights of Gladness" ===
"Nights of Gladness"
National Promenade Band

It was for "Nights of Gladness", written in 1912, that Ancliffe became most famous. The waltz became so popular all over the world that in later years the BBC named a long-running series of light music programmes after it, using it as the signature tune It was played at two State balls held at Buckingham Palace, and included in the programme at the Royal Command Performance at the Palace of Varieties.

More than a hundred years after it was written it is still to be found included on many CD compilations of light music, played by notable orchestras such as the Royal Philharmonic Orchestra. It sold over two million copies but unfortunately he had sold it for £10 but continued to earn an income from the performing rights.

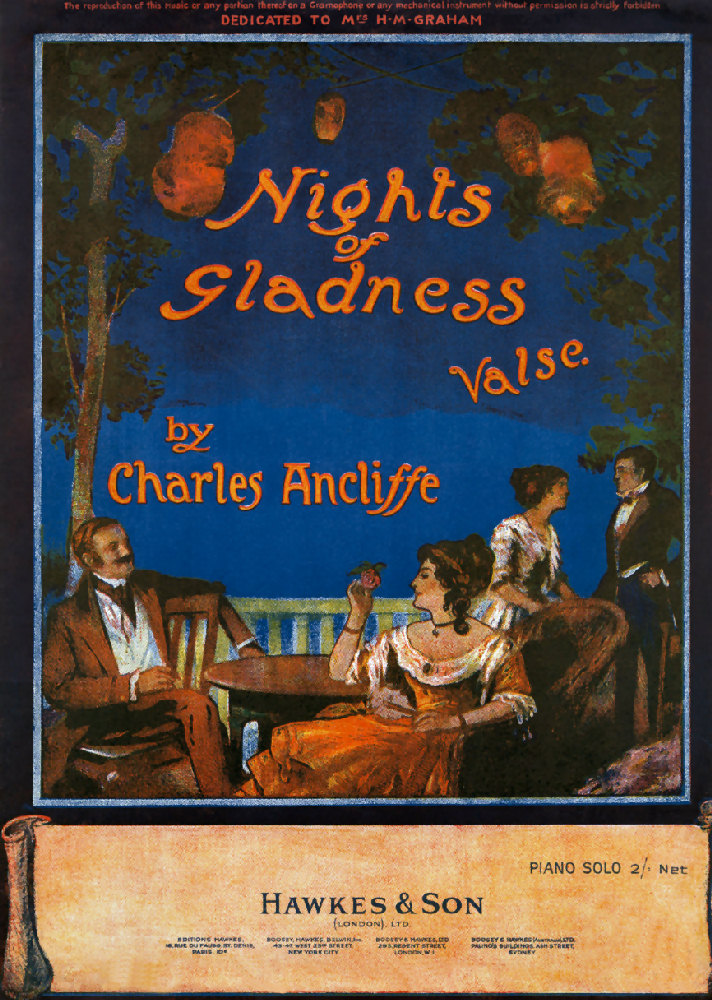
Nights of Gladness

After leaving the services, Ancliffe was a regular conductor of the Scarborough Military Band from 1924 to 1927, and was also a frequent guest conductor of his own works on BBC Radio. He had been conductor of the Scarborough Municipal Band in the 1920s but admitted that he had "been unable to find employment except during three months of the season." "He had composed music, but latterly had sold very little because of the popularity of jazz." and was living on his £85 army pension.

His music was recorded including by the Palm Court Theatre orchestra, Victor Military Band, Prince's Orchestra, and the London Palladium Orchestra on labels including Victor, Columbia, and Edison. He conducted his own work with the BBC Wireless Orchestra and his work included film soundtracks. He composed "Take Your Partners" especially for Sydney Thompson's old-time dance feature. He composed "Twickenham Fair" with words by Mr A W Woodward, for the borough fair in 1950.

== Personal life ==
He married Eva Jessie Laver (1881–1963) in 1904 in St John's Church, Portland, Weymouth. They had a daughter Kathleen Jessie born 1906 in Karachi, now in Pakistan, and another daughter Joan Isobel born in 1911 at Chatham. In 1911 the family were living in Chatham Barracks, in 1921 at 23, Glebe Road, Barnes and in 1939 in Guildford. They moved to Twickenham in 1940.

He died at the Richmond Royal Hospital on 20 December 1952 after he collapsed in George Street, Richmond. He was then living at 5 Poulett Gardens, Twickenham; he left £7 in his will. His funeral was at Mortlake Crematorium.

== Selected compositions ==
=== Waltzes ===
- April Clouds
- Dream Princess
- Festive Days
- Irish Whispers
- Red Leaves
- Shy Glancess
- Southern Nights
- Temptation
- Thrills
- Twilight Time
- Unforgotten Hours
- Smiles, then kisses

=== Miscellaneous short pieces ===
- A Forest Wooing
- April's Lady
- Burma Intermezzo
- Cinderella's Wedding
- Down in Zanzibar
- El Saludo
- Fragrance
- Hans the Stroller
- Mariette-Coquette
- Moon Maid
- Peacock's Parade
- Penelope's Garden
- Secrets
- Valley of Roses
- The Flutter of the Fay

=== Suites ===
- Below Bridges
- Southern Impressions
- The Purple Vine (in three movements): The Vintagers, The Purple Vine and Evening at the Inn
- Suite Poetique

=== Songs ===
- "Ask Daddy"
- "Someday in Somebody's Eyes"
- "I Cannot Live Without You"
