= The Citadel (1960 film) =

1960 American television movie

- Based on: The Citadel by A. J. Cronin
- Directed by: Paul Bogart
- Starring: James Donald; Ann Blyth; Lloyd Bochner; Hugh Griffith; Torin Thatcher
- Country of origin: United States
- Original language: English

Production
- Producer: David Susskind

Original release
- Network: ABC
- Release: February 19, 1960

The Citadel is a 1960 American television film adaptation of A. J. Cronin's 1937 novel The Citadel. It was written by Dale Wasserman and directed by Paul Bogart. It starred James Donald as Dr. Manson and Ann Blyth as Christine Barlow.

Other television versions of The Citadel include two British serials (1960 and 1983), and two Italian adaptations (1964 and 2003).

== Cast ==
- Ann Blyth as Christine Barlow
- Lloyd Bochner as Freddie Parker
- Torin Thatcher as Sir Robert Abbey
- James Donald as Dr. Andrew Manson
- Larry Gates as Richard Stillman
- Hugh Griffith as Philip Denny
- Carroll O'Connor as Dr. Llewellyn
- Liam Redmond as Ben Chenkin
- George Rose as Owen
- Francis Compton as William Boon
- Anthony Dawson as Charles Ivory
- Joan White as Mrs. Page
