= Stranger on the Shore (TV serial) =

- Genre: Drama
- Written by: Sheila Hodgson
- Directed by: Kevin Sheldon
- Starring: Jeanne le Bars; Amanda Grinling; Beatrix Mackey; Richard Vernon
- Opening theme: "Stranger on the Shore" by Acker Bilk
- Country of origin: United Kingdom
- Original language: English
- No. of episodes: 5 (3 missing)

Production
- Producer: Kevin Sheldon
- Running time: 30 minutes

Original release
- Network: BBC TV
- Release: 24 September – 22 October 1961

Related
- Stranger in the City

Stranger on the Shore is a British television drama serial first broadcast by the BBC in 1961. It was written by Sheila Hodgson, and produced and directed by Kevin Sheldon. The show was a children's serial shown on Sunday afternoons. The five-episode series portrays Marie-Hélène Ronsin, a young French teenager, on her first trip to England as an au pair. Speaking some English, but very shy, she lives with a family in Brighton, and faces the challenges of culture shock. The series was followed the following year by a sequel, entitled Stranger in the City.

Acker Bilk's "Jenny" was renamed "Stranger on the Shore" when it was chosen as the theme for the series. It was subsequently released as a single, spending 55 weeks in the UK singles chart and becoming the best-selling record of 1962 in the U.S. chart.

Of the five episodes produced, only two survived the BBC's junkings. The sequel series, Stranger in the City, was also subject to having all six of its episodes wiped, and is completely lost.

== Cast ==
- Jeanne Le Bars as Marie-Hélène Ronsin
- Amanda Grinling as Penelope Gough
- Beatrix Mackey as Mrs. Gough
- Richard Vernon as David Gough
- Denis Gilmore as Paul (Podger) Gough
