= Citadel (disambiguation) =

A citadel is a castle, fortress, or fortified center.

Citadel may also refer to:

== Places ==
- Citadel of Erbil, a palace in Erbil, Iraq
- Citadel of Aleppo, a palace in Aleppo, Syria
- Citadel, Calgary, a neighbourhood in Calgary, Alberta, Canada
- Citadel Hill (Fort George), a fortified hill in Halifax, Nova Scotia, Canada
- Citadel Island, Victoria, Australia
- Citadel Outlets, an outlet mall in Commerce, California, United States

== Arts and entertainment ==
=== Fictional entities ===
- Citadel, in Oldtown, a library and medical school run by maestres, in George R.R. Martin's A Song of Ice and Fire universe
- Citadel (Half-Life), headquarters for Wallace Breen in City 17 in Half-Life 2
- The Citadel, home fortress of the Citadelians a fictional alien empire in the DC Comics universe; see Omega Men
- The Citadel, a space station that houses the galactic government in the Mass Effect series

=== Film and television ===
- Citadel (film), a 2012 film
- Citadel (TV series), a 2023 American television series, or one of its spin-offs
  - Citadel: Honey Bunny, an Indian television series
  - Citadel: Diana, an Italian television series

=== Gaming ===
- Citadel (video game), by Superior Software
- Citadels (card game), a German-style card game
- Citadel (board game), a fantasy board game published 1976
- Citadels (video game), a 2013 Arthurian video game

=== Literature ===
- Citadel (2011 novel), a novel by science fiction writer John Ringo
- Citadel (1957 book), a non-fiction book by William S. White

=== Music ===
- Citadel (Ne Obliviscaris album)
- Citadel (Starcastle album)
- Citadel, an album by Muslimgauze
- "Citadel" (song), a song by the Rolling Stones

== Brands and enterprises ==
- Citadel Broadcasting, an American broadcast holding company
- Citadel Films, a defunct Indian film studio
- Citadel LLC, a hedge fund management company
- Citadel Miniatures, a miniatures company owned by Games Workshop
- Citadel Press, a publishing company
- Citadel Records, an Australian independent record label
- Citadel Securities, a market maker
- Citadel Theatre, Edinburgh, Scotland

== Computing ==
- Citadel (malware), a ZeuS-based botnet alleged to have stolen over US$500,000,000 from personal bank accounts
- Citadel (software), a BBS software
- Citadel/UX, an implementation of Citadel that has evolved into a modern groupware platform

== Other uses ==
- Armored citadel, protective enclosure in a ship
- Halifax Citadels, a defunct American Hockey League team
- Operation Citadel, part of the World War II Battle of Kursk
- Salvation Army citadel, a Salvation Army meeting place

== See also ==
- Citadelle (disambiguation)
- Cittadella (disambiguation)
- Royal Citadel (disambiguation)
- The Citadel (disambiguation)
