= La Cittadella (1964 miniseries) =

- Genre: Drama
- Based on: The Citadel by A. J. Cronin
- Screenplay by: Anton Giulio Majano
- Directed by: Anton Giulio Majano
- Starring: Alberto Lupo; Anna Maria Guarnieri; Fosco Giachetti; Nando Gazzolo; Eleonora Rossi Drago
- Music by: Riz Ortolani
- Country of origin: Italy
- Original language: Italian
- No. of episodes: 8

Production
- Cinematography: Massimo Sallusti; Vincenzo Seratrice
- Running time: 62 min. (per episode)
- Production company: Radiotelevisione Italiana

Original release
- Network: Programma Nazionale
- Release: 9 February – 22 March 1964

La Cittadella is a 1964 Italian miniseries based on A. J. Cronin's 1937 novel, The Citadel, and produced by Radiotelevisione Italiana. It was directed by Anton Giulio Majano and stars Alberto Lupo as Dr. Manson and Anna Maria Guarnieri as his wife, Christine. Other television versions include an American (1960), another Italian (2003), and two British adaptations, 1960 and 1983.

== Cast ==
- Alberto Lupo as Andrew Manson
- Anna Maria Guarnieri as Cristina Barlow
- Carlo Hintermann as Denny
- Laura Efrikian as Mary Boland
- Eleonora Rossi Drago as Francis Lawrence
- Loretta Goggi as Florrie
- Nando Gazzolo as Freddie Hamson
- Lida Ferro as Blodwen Page
- Aldo Silvani as Prof. Abbey
- Fosco Giachetti as Prof. Gadsby
- Ferruccio De Ceresa as Stillman
- Mercedes Brignone as Lady Gladys
- Antonella Della Porta as Margie
- Gabriele Antonini as Grenfell
- Gianni Solaro as Sutton
- Mario Ferrari as Avv. Boon
- Luigi Pavese as Con Boland
- Nino Pavese as Prof. Mc Donald
- Guido Celano as Russell
