= The Citadel (2003 miniseries) =

- La Cittadella
- Genre: Drama
- Based on: The Citadel by A. J. Cronin
- Written by: Salvatore Basile; Andrea Oliva
- Directed by: Fabrizio Costa
- Starring: Massimo Ghini; Barbora Bobuľová; Franco Castellano; Anna Galiena
- Music by: Stefano Caprioli
- Country of origin: Italy
- No. of episodes: 4

Production
- Producers: Guido Lombardo; Fania Petrocchi
- Cinematography: Adolfo Troiani
- Editor: Cosimo Andronico
- Camera setup: Super 16
- Running time: 100 min. (per episode)
- Production company: Titanus

Original release
- Release: 23 March – 26 March 2003

La Cittadella is a 2003 Italian miniseries based on A. J. Cronin's 1937 novel, The Citadel, and produced by Titanus. It was directed by Fabrizio Costa and stars Massimo Ghini as Dr. Manson and Barbora Bobuľová as his wife, Christine. Other television versions include an American (1960), another Italian (1964), and two British (1960 and 1983) adaptations.

== Cast ==
- Massimo Ghini as Andrew Manson
- Barbora Bobulova as Christine Barlow
- Franco Castellano as Danny

== Locations ==
The program was filmed on location in the Czech Republic, London, and Cardiff, Wales.
