= The Citadel (1960 TV series) =

British television series

- Based on: The Citadel by A. J. Cronin
- Directed by: John Frankau
- Starring: Eric Lander; Zena Walker; Jack May; Elizabeth Shepherd; Richard Vernon; Noel Harrison
- Country of origin: United Kingdom
- No. of episodes: 9 (all missing)

Production
- Running time: 30 minutes
- Production company: Associated-Rediffusion Television

Original release
- Network: ITV
- Release: 23 November 1960 – 18 January 1961

The Citadel is a 1960 British television adaptation of A. J. Cronin's 1937 novel, The Citadel. The series was directed by John Frankau and produced by Peter Graham Scott. It starred Eric Lander as Dr. Andrew Manson, and Zena Walker as Christine, his wife. This television adaptation is entirely missing, i.e. all nine episodes are believed to be lost.

Other television versions include an American television film (1960), another British serial (1983), and two Italian (1964 and 2003) adaptations.

== Cast ==
- Eric Lander as Dr. Andrew Manson 9 episodes, 1960-1961
- Zena Walker as Christine Barlow 7 episodes, 1960-1961
- Jack May as Dr. Philip Denny 6 episodes, 1960-1961
- Noel Harrison as Freddie Foxley 6 episodes, 1960-1961
- Barry Keegan as Con Boland 6 episodes, 1960-1961
- Elizabeth Shepherd as Frances Le Roy 5 episodes, 1960-1961
- Richard Vernon as Dr. Ivory 5 episodes, 1960-1961
- John Laurie as Sir Robert Abbey 5 episodes, 1960-1961
- Richard Carpenter as Dr. Philip Hope 5 episodes, 1960-1961
- Fiona Duncan as Mary Boland 5 episodes, 1960-1961
