= The Corridor People =

1966 British TV detective series

- Genre: Thriller; Surrealism
- Created by: Edward Boyd
- Directed by: David Boisseau
- Starring: Gary Cockrell; Alan Curtis; William Maxwell; John Sharp; Elizabeth Shepherd
- Theme music composer: Derek Hilton
- Country of origin: United Kingdom
- Original language: English
- No. of series: 1
- No. of episodes: 4

Production
- Producer: Richard Everitt
- Camera setup: Multiple-camera setup
- Running time: 55 minutes
- Production company: Granada

Original release
- Network: ITV
- Release: 26 August – 16 September 1966

The Corridor People is a 1966 British television series produced by Granada Television for the ITV network, directed by David Boisseau and devised and written by Edward Boyd.

A surreal black-and-white detective series, The Corridor People pitched security agent Kronk against exotic villainess Syrie Van Epp over the course of four 55-minute episodes.

== Cast ==
- Elizabeth Shepherd as Syrie Van Epp
- John Sharp as Kronk
- Gary Cockrell as Phil Scrotty
- Alan Curtis as Inspector Blood
- William Maxwell as Sergeant Hound
- Ian Trigger as Nonesuch
- Calvin Lockhart as Theobald Aboo

== Episode list ==
No.	Title	Directed by	Written by	Original release date
1	"Victim as Birdwatcher"	David Boisseau	Eddie Boyd	26 August 1966
Syrie Van Epp kidnaps an ornithologist in order to gain control of a company which produces a unique product.
2	"Victim as Whitebait"	David Boisseau	Eddie Boyd	2 September 1966
Seeking to locate a reclusive accountant, Syrie Van Epp restores Phil Scrotty to life with the help of a disillusioned scientist (whom she later has killed). However, Scrotty, unreliable as ever, turns the tables and outwits everyone.
3	"Victim as Red"	David Boiseau	Eddie Boyd	9 September 1966
Syrie Van Epp is keen to assist a man who remembers nothing except the phrase two million pounds. It is likely that there is a connection with a client of Scrotty's who has lost his amnesiac brother, yet the outcome is not what anyone expects.
4	"Victim as Black"	David Boiseau	Eddie Boyd	16 September 1966
Queen Helena of Morphonia visits Britain in search of her idealistic son, who is searching for the commoner whom he fell in love with. Unsurprisingly, Syrie Van Epp has a hand in the mystery.

== Reception ==
NostalgiaCentral.com described the series as "confusing, erudite, self-consciously absurd and packed with eccentric dialogue."

Critic Kim Newman wrote: "In 1968, audiences were baffled (and enraged) by the final episodes of The Prisoner. Lord knows what they made of The Corridor People, a surreal spy/detective/fantasy series which Granada broadcast two years earlier. I’m fairly attuned to ‘weird’, and even I find this show, which lasted for just four episodes, unsettlingly strange. It's hard to judge whether the series achieves precisely what it sets out to do, or just misses the mark as either spoof or serious thriller."

Television Heaven wrote: "The Corridor People was very much a product of its televisual times, following in the footsteps of such contemporaries as The Avengers and Adam Adamant Lives!. However, unlike these more popular series this stylized swinging sixties Mystery/Detective/Thriller/Spy drama has failed to develop any long-term fan base or appreciation. Perhaps this was due to its limited run which prevented the building of a viewing base or perhaps it was just too off the wall and left field even for the psychedelic decade. The otherwise excellent book the Guinness Book of Classic Television describes the programme rather unfairly as "...the Twin Peaks of its day."

Tise Vahimagi wrote in British Television: An Illustrated Guide: "The mid-1960s was the prime period for offbeat thrillers and send-up series and this comic-strip yet stylish four-part adventure was one of the weirder ones devised. ... Unfortunately, the series was too short to develop its own special audience in the cult style of The Avengers and Adam Adamant Lives!."

== Home media ==
The series was released on DVD in 2012 by Network, with the original 405-line video converted to 625-line.
