= Citadelle =

Citadelle, the French word for citadel, may refer to:

- Citadel of Quebec or La Citadelle, a military installation and government residence in Quebec City, Canada
- Citadelle Laferrière or the Citadelle, a 19th-century fortress in Nord, Haiti
- Citadelle (gin), a French brand of gin
- Citadelle, a 1948 book by Antoine de Saint-Exupéry
- Citadelle, a 2019 album by Izïa
- The proper name of the star HD 1502

== See also ==
- Citadel (disambiguation)
- Cittadella (disambiguation)
- Citadellet, a demolished 19th-century Norwegian fortress
- The Citadel (disambiguation)
