= Anna Maria Guarnieri =

Italian actress

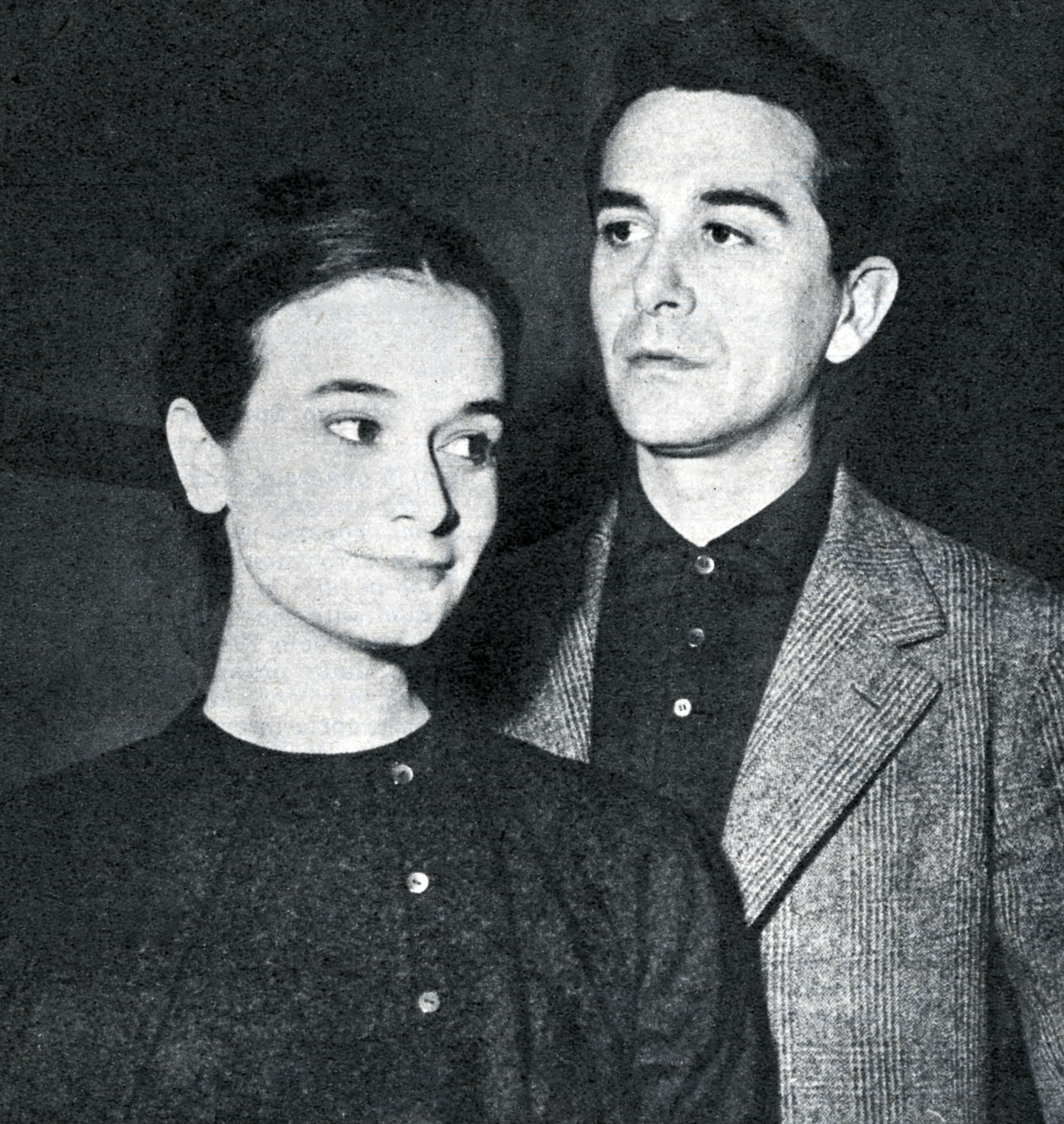
Guarnieri with Giorgio De Lullo

Anna Maria Guarnieri (born 20 August 1933, in Milan) is an Italian actress, notable for her work in theatre and film and as a voice actor, particularly during the 1960s.
