= Edward White (composer) =

British composer

Edward George White (21 August 1910 – 1994) was a British composer of light music, whose compositions including "The Runaway Rocking-Horse" (1946), "Paris Interlude" (1952), "Puffin' Billy" (1952) and the signature tune for The Telegoons (1963), became familiar as radio and television theme tunes.

== Career ==
White was born in London, England, and was largely self-taught. As Teddy White he became a violinist in a trio and various dance bands (including under Lou Preager), performing also on saxophone and clarinet. He became known as an arranger of music and, after service in the RAF during World War II, he ran a ballroom orchestra at the Grand Spa Hotel (later the Avon Gorge Hotel) in Bristol.

White began to compose original pieces - an early success was Desert Star in 1939, recorded by the Jack Harris Orchestra for HMV Records - and set up his own publishing company, Musicus Ltd. He established himself as a composer of light orchestral music after the war, finding regular work with the BBC and with library music publishers, particularly the Chappell Recording Music Library. He composed around 200 pieces including Barbados, Ballet in Blue, Cabana, Caprice for Strings, Clockwork Clown, Effervescence, Fairy on the Fiddles, Ghost Train, Idle Jack, Paris Interlude, Puffin' Billy, The Roundabout, The Runaway Rocking-Horse, White Wedding and Yodelling Strings. In 1961 'The Sound of Ed White', the first stereophonic single ever released in the UK, was issued on Pye Records, including the White compositions Coral Reef and Tropical Blue.

== "Puffin' Billy" ==
"Puffin' Billy" (1952) is perhaps his most familiar composition, especially in the original recording by Hubert Clifford and the Melodi Light Orchestra. The piece was inspired by an old steam locomotive called "Puffing Billy" (not the locomotive in the London Science Museum), seen by the composer while on holiday on the Isle of Wight. It was used as the signature tune for the BBC Light Programme's Children's Favourites, a radio request programme, from 1952 to 1966.

In the United States it was used for an even longer period of time (1955–1974) as the theme music to Captain Kangaroo on the CBS TV network. When a new theme song for Captain Kangaroo was used as "Good Morning, Captain", a portion of the "Puffing Billy" theme was used, played by strings, so that the theme trademark could live on through the next generations. In 1957, permission was granted for Mary Rodgers to write lyrics to the tune and the vocal version was given the title "Captain Kangaroo".

"Puffin' Billy" has often been used to signify 1950s Middle England, for example in The Comic Strip's parodies of The Famous Five, in some of the last cigar adverts on British TV in the early 1990s, and in a trailer for a 2004 Channel 4 documentary about anti-asylum-seeker demonstrators in Lee-on-the-Solent.

"Puffin' Billy" was featured in the Pixar short Tin Toy.

== "The Runaway Rocking-Horse" ==
"The Runaway Rocking-Horse" (1946) was another White novelty tune used as the theme tune for the filmed U.S. television series Life with Buster Keaton (1951–1952).

== Personal life ==
White was a member of the Savage Club. He "discovered" the singer (and later actress) Janie Marden (1934–1991) in 1956 when she was 22 years old and working as a telephonist in Bristol. They married in the 1960s. By the 1970s they were splitting their time between a flat in Chelsea and another in Majorca. Marden pre-deceased her husband in Spain in 1991, aged 57. White died there in February 1994, aged 83.
