= Frederic Curzon =

English composer, conductor and musician

Frederic Curzon (4 September 1899 – 6 December 1973) was an English composer, conductor and organist, associated with the theatre, early cinema and light music. He sometimes wrote under the pen names Graham Collett and Harold Ramsay.

== Biography ==
Curzon was born in London, showing early promise studying the violin, cello, piano and organ. By the age of 16 he was playing piano in theatres, and by 20 he was accompanying silent films in cinemas around the country, using music he had composed himself. Curzon was an early exponent of the electronic organ. From 1926 to 1934 he became the organist at Shepherd’s Bush Pavilion, run by the Gaumont British Film Corporation, whose head of music Louis Levy commissioned scores from him. He moved to the New Victoria Cinema in 1935, and in 1938 gave up salaried employment to concentrate full time on composition. That year he composed the music for the high profile 1939-1949 radio comedy series ITMA (It's That Man Again), starring Tommy Handley. From 1939 and throughout the war he conducted at Llandudno Pier. Throughout the 1940s and 1950s he continued to perform organ music for frequent broadcasts at the BBC Theatre Organ.

He was encouraged as an orchestral concert composer by the Bournemouth Municipal Orchestra conductor Dan Godfrey and by the music publisher Ralph Hawkes, and was appointed head of Boosey & Hawkes’s Light Music department, where he was an early contributor of mood music or library music, pre-written, royalty-free cues for newsreels, documentaries, radio and eventually television. This caused something of a rift between Curzon and The Musicians' Union, which accused him of "making gramophone records of a kind that could be used publicly to the disadvantage of other musicians".

Curzon married Gladys Marian Fowler in 1937. He returned to Bournemouth in the 1960s - his address there was 15, Winifred's Road - where he died in 1973.

== Music ==
While there are some songs in the ballad style and some solo piano pieces, Curzon's light music for the concert hall was mostly orchestral. Examples include The Spanish Suite: In Malaga (1935) and the Robin Hood Suite (1937), as well as single movement overtures and character pieces such as The Boulevardier (1941, perhaps his best known piece), the Cascade Waltz (1946), Dance of an Ostracised Imp (1940) and Punchinello (1948) which were all popular in their day. The overture Chevalier was commissioned by the BBC for its Light Music Festival in 1949. Capricante, also from 1949, was dedicated to his friend Pasquale Troise. Many of his pieces have been recorded as part of the Guild Light Music series. A Marco Polo CD of orchestral music was issued in 1992.

== Selected works ==
- The Boulevardier, characteristic intermezzo (1943)
- Bravada (Paro Doble) (1938)
- Capricante (1949)
- Cascade Waltz (1936)
- Ceremonial Occasion, march (1953)
- Charm of Youth Suite
- Chevalier overture (first broadcast 1949)
- Dance of the Ostracised Imp (1940)
- Fanfares
  - Fanfare No. 4
  - Fanfare No. 5 "For a Merry Occasion"
  - Fanfare No. 6 "Westminster"
- Galavant (1949)
- La Peineta, Spanish Serenade (1938)
- Pasquinade (1943)
- Pastoral Scene (1938)
- Punchinello miniature overture (1948)
- Robin Hood Suite (1937)
- Salon Suite (1942)
- Saltarello for piano and orchestra (1952)
- Serenade of a Clown (1939)
- Simonetta, Serenade (1943)
- Spanish Suite: In Malaga (1935)
- Vanguard overture
