= Stranger on the Shore =

Single by Mr. Acker Bilk and the Leon Young String Chorale
- B-side: "Take My Lips" (UK) "Cielito Lindo" (US)
- Released: October 1961
- Genre: Jazz; easy listening; pop
- Length: 2:52
- Label: Columbia DB4750 (UK); Atco 45-6217 (US)
- Songwriter: Acker Bilk
- Producer: Denis Preston

Mr. Acker Bilk and the Leon Young String Chorale singles chronology
"Stars and Stripes Forever/Creole Jazz" (1961)	"Stranger on the Shore" (1961)	"Frankie and Johnny" (1962)

"Stranger on the Shore" is a piece for clarinet written by Acker Bilk for his young daughter and originally named "Jenny" after her. The tune was written on a single scrap of paper by Bilk and handed over to arranger Leon Young who crafted the string arrangement, including the characteristic harmonic shifts at the very end.

The recording was subsequently used as the theme tune of a BBC TV drama serial for children, Stranger on the Shore. It was first released in 1961 in the UK, and then in the US, and reached number 1 on the US Billboard Hot 100 and number 2 on the UK Singles Chart.

== Chart and sales performance ==
The track, performed by Acker Bilk (as "Mr. Acker Bilk") with backing by the Leon Young String Chorale, was recorded at the Lansdowne Studios and produced by Denis Preston with sound engineer Adrian Kerridge. It was released as a single on EMI's Columbia label, catalogue number DB 4750, in October 1961; the label text states "Theme from the BBC T.V. Series" as it was used as the theme song to the series Stranger on the Shore. The UK B-side was "Take My Lips" whereas the US flipside was "Cielito Lindo". The single became a phenomenal success, topping the NME singles chart and spending nearly a year on the Record Retailer Top 50. It was the UK's biggest-selling single of 1962, the biggest-selling instrumental single of all time, and appears fifty-eighth in the official UK list of best-selling singles issued in 2002. It had sold 1.16 million copies as of November 2012.

One of songwriter and music publisher Robert Mellin's major songwriting successes came in 1962, when he wrote lyrics for this song, allowing it to be covered by vocal acts including Andy Williams and the Drifters.

On 26 May 1962, "Stranger on the Shore" became the first British recording to reach number one on the U.S. Billboard Hot 100 where it was issued by Atlantic Records on the Atco label, but it was quickly followed, on 22 December, by British band The Tornados' "Telstar", another instrumental. In the pre-rock era, Vera Lynn's "Auf Wiederseh'n Sweetheart" had reached #1 in 1952, on the shorter "Best Sellers In Stores" survey. After "Telstar", the next British performers to top the U.S. charts were the Beatles, with their first Capitol Records single "I Want to Hold Your Hand". "Stranger on the Shore" was Billboard's #1 single of 1962, and it spent seven weeks atop the "Easy Listening" chart, which later became known as the Adult Contemporary chart. The tune became the second of three "one-hit wonders" named "pop single of the year" by Billboard (the others being 1958's "Volare (Nel Blu Dipinto Di Blu)" by Domenico Modugno and 2006's "Bad Day" by Daniel Powter).

The song is certified gold by the Recording Industry Association of America.

== Cover versions ==
The composition has been covered by many other artists, most prominently a vocal 1962 version by Andy Williams from his album Warm and Willing, which reached #9 on the adult contemporary chart, #30 in the UK, and #38 on the Billboard Hot 100, and a group vocal version by the Drifters for their compilation album Up on the Roof – The Best of the Drifters, which reached #19 on the adult contemporary chart and #73 on the Billboard Hot 100. Herb Alpert performed an instrumental cover on his 1987 album Keep Your Eye on Me. Kenny G covered the song in 1999 on his album, Classics in the Key of G. A version in French, "Savoir Aimer", was sung by Nana Mouskouri.

== In popular culture ==
In May 1969, the crew of Apollo 10 took "Stranger on the Shore" on their mission to the Moon. Gene Cernan, a member of the crew, included the tune on a cassette tape used in the command module of the Apollo spacecraft.

The song was used as the theme music for the 2003–2013 BBC Radio 4 sketch show That Mitchell and Webb Sound.

== Charts ==
=== Weekly charts ===
Chart (1962)	Peak position
Canada (CHUM Chart)	3
United Kingdom (Record Retailer)	2
United Kingdom (NME)	1
United Kingdom (Record Mirror)	1
U.S. Billboard Hot 100	1

=== All-time charts ===
Chart	Position
UK Singles (Official Charts Company)	95
US Billboard Hot 100 (1958-2018)	360

== Certifications ==
Certifications for "Stranger on the Shore"
Region	Certification	Certified units/sales
United States (RIAA)	Gold	1,000,000^{^}
^{^} Shipments figures based on certification alone.

== Album ==
Released in 1961, the original Stranger on the Shore album also featured the string arrangements of Leon Young and the performances of his Chorale string players. It primarily consists of melodies from classical, traditional and show music sources, but there is one more original: Is This the Blues, also assembled by Young from a Bilk melody.
