= Don't Tell Anyone =

2015 documentary film by Mikaela Shwer

- Spanish: No Le Digas a Nadie
- Directed by: Mikaela Shwer
- Music by: Ben Messlebeck

Production
- Producers: Katie O'Rourke: Alexandra Nikolchev; Mikaela Shwer
- Cinematography: Arianna Lapenne; Autumn Eakin
- Editor: Mikaela Shwer
- Production company: Portret Films

Original release
- Network: PBS
- Release: September 21, 2015

Don't Tell Anyone (Spanish: No Le Digas a Nadie) is a 2015 documentary film directed by Mikaela Shwer. The documentary follows Angy Rivera, a Colombian immigrant and activist, as she publicly challenges life as an undocumented young woman in the United States.

== Synopsis ==
The film follows Angy Rivera, a Colombian immigrant who has lived in the United States since the age of four. Unlike her siblings born in the country, Rivera is undocumented and grew up concealing her status. As a young adult, she sought a pathway to citizenship and higher education, and became active in immigrant rights advocacy, participating in rallies and creating an online advice column. The film documents her personal experiences and activism as she attends John Jay College, where she majors in criminal justice.

== Production ==
Filmmaker Mikaela Shwer first learned of Angy Rivera in 2012 through Ask Angy, an online advice column Rivera created for undocumented youth in 2010. Shwer initially intended to produce a short film and public service announcement about the column, but the project developed into a feature documentary following Rivera's activism and personal life.

== Reception ==
In her review for Letras Libres, Alexandra Délano Alonso, Associate Professor of Global Studies at The New School, described Don't Tell Anyone an "unmissable documentary" and described it as a "subtle and honest portrait" that illustrates the strength of undocumented youth like Angy Rivera, who transform experiences of discrimination and abuse into activism. Délano noted how Rivera's decision to publicly share her story, through rallies, writing, online platforms, and the documentary itself, became a source of empowerment for others facing similar circumstances.

=== Awards and accolades ===
The film won a Peabody Award in 2015.
