= Angy Palumbo =

Italian composer

Angelo Palumbo (died 1960) was an Italian musician, composer and music teacher, mainly active in London.

== As a musician and teacher ==
Palumbo was a specialist of various fretted instruments, and his advertisements in the trade journal B.M.G. shows that he taught guitar as well as banjo, mandolin and violin playing. He himself also played several of these instruments as a member of "Troise and his Mandoliers", a band led by fellow Italian immigrant Pasquale Troise (1895–1957). This band recorded frequently and also made regular radio appearances.

British-American banjoist John A. Sloan (born 1923) was one of Palumbo's pupils as a youngster and witnessed that Palumbo was an excellent but also very temperamental musician.

== As composer ==
During his career, Palumbo composed several numbers. His 6/8 March It's Up To You (lyrics: Arthur Beale) from 1940 became familiar to Swedish audiences by being used in the soundtracks for two of the popular films about private eye Hillman in 1958 and 1959. In more recent years his Petite Bolero for Mandolin & Guitar has appeared on the CD Captain Corelli's Mandolin and the Latin Trilogy – Music from the Novels of Louis de Bernières.

In addition to the numbers listed above, John A. Sloane has also mentioned a composition called Hillderino, and the British Library lists the following additional works by Palumbo:

- Take It Easy (1939)
- Segoviana (1939)
- Penelope (1965)
- Marcietta Espagnol (1965)
- Party Waltz (1966)
- Lazy Moments (1967)
- Carminetta (1967)

The five titles from the 1960s are all listed as "plectrum guitar solos".

== Life and death ==
According to John A. Sloan, Palumbo had a physical disability, one of his legs being several centimetres shorter than the other. Sloan's recollection was also that Palumbo was in his mid-fifties in the middle of the 1930s, that he had a wife and a daughter and that he was a cousin of Pasqual Troise. His lessons were given in Navarino Road in Hackney.

According to B.M.G. Angy Palumbo died in October 1960.

== Main sources ==
- Sven Bjerstedt: "Angy Palumbo – The pen name that was real" in B.M.G. (winter issue 2009)
- Emma Bartholomew: "Searching for memories of the man with the mandolin" in Hackney Gazette November 19, page 24.
