= Royal Citadel =

Royal Citadel may refer to:

- Royal Citadel, Plymouth, a fort in Plymouth, England
- Real Cittadella, a fort in Messina, Sicily
