= Sydney Thompson (musician) =

BBC bandleader

Sydney Thompson was a BBC bandleader of the 1950s. His "Old-Tyme Dance Orchestra" was one of the leading UK bands of the period.
