= The Citadel (novel) =

1937 novel by A. J. Cronin

- First edition
- Author: A. J. Cronin
- Language: English
- Published: 1937; Victor Gollancz (UK); Little, Brown (US)
- Publication place: United Kingdom
- Media type: Print (hardback & paperback)
- Pages: 446 pp. (UK hardcover)

The Citadel is a novel by A. J. Cronin, published in 1937. It was a global bestseller that was groundbreaking in its treatment of the contentious subject of medical ethics. Some have credited the novel and its 1938 film adaptation with contributing to the creation of the UK's NHS a decade later, although others claim that was not Cronin's intent. In the U.S., The Citadel won the National Book Award in the "Favorite Novel" category.

== Background ==
As he had for his 1935 novel The Stars Look Down, Cronin added authenticity to The Citadel by using his 1920s experiences as a medical inspector in the coal-mining communities of the South Wales Valleys. In Tredegar he had researched and reported on the correlation between coal dust inhalation and lung disease, a scientific inquiry incorporated into The Citadel. Cronin also worked as a doctor for the Tredegar Medical Aid Society in the town's Cottage Hospital. In the novel's coal-mining town of Aberalaw, Dr. Manson is hired by the Medical Aid Society. It is explained to him that miners pay contributions to the Society out of their weekly wages and in return receive medical care for themselves and their families; this reputedly became a model for the National Health Service as established under Aneurin Bevan. For the novel's descriptions of the world of high-paid private physicians in London, the author drew on his background practising medicine on Harley Street and in Notting Hill.

Cronin stated: "I have written in The Citadel all I feel about the medical profession, its injustices, its hide-bound unscientific stubbornness, its humbug ... The horrors and inequities detailed in the story I have personally witnessed. This is not an attack against individuals, but against a system."

== Plot summary ==
In October 1924, Andrew Manson, an idealistic, newly qualified doctor, arrives from Scotland to work as assistant to Dr. Page in the small (fictitious) Welsh mining town of Drineffy (Blaenelly is the name given in some adaptations). He quickly realises that Page is unwell and disabled and that he must run the entire medical practise for a meagre wage. Shocked by the unsanitary conditions he discovers among the miners and their families, Manson strives to improve matters. He obtains the aid of Dr. Philip Denny, a cynical semi-alcoholic who, Manson finds out in due course, took a post as an assistant doctor after having fallen from grace as a surgeon.

Resigning after a spat with the sister of Dr. Page, the landlady and financial controller of her brother's practise, Manson gets hired as a doctor in a miners' Medical Aid Society in "Aberalaw", a neighbouring coal-mining town in the South Wales coalfield. On the strength of this job, Manson marries Christine Barlow, a junior school teacher, whom he had met in Drineffy.

Manson is initially unpopular with Aberalaw miners, owing to his scrupulous refusal to issue work-excusing certificates to men he deems fit enough to work. However, as time passes, he builds a positive reputation in the town. He dedicates many hours to learning about the lung disease that afflicts miners. Christine helps her husband with his silicosis research. He studies for, and is granted, the MRCP, and when his research is published, an MD. The research gains him a post with the Coal and Metalliferous Mines Fatigue Board (CMFB) in London, but he resigns after six months to set up a private practise, finding the bureaucracy of Civil Service infuriating.

He is seduced by the prospect of easy money from wealthy London clients, and abandons the idealistic principles he started with. As his private practise enlarges, he caters to pampered patients and befriends fashionable surgeons. Manson drifts away from his wife, becoming romantically involved with Frances Lawrence, an upper-class woman. But after he witnesses a patient's death due to the ineptitude of a surgeon that Manson had associated with and recommended, Manson is shocked into quitting his lucrative practise and returning to his principles. He files a complaint against the surgeon for negligent actions that resulted in a patient dying on the operating table.

Manson collaborates with Dr. Hope, whom he had met at the Mines Fatigue Board, and with his former colleague Philip Denny, to create a non-profit group of medical professionals in a small West Midlands town. Their plan is for each doctor to concentrate on his areas of specialty, so as to reduce the usual burdens imposed on GPs, and thereby improve patient healthcare outcomes. Manson and his wife begin to repair their damaged relationship, but then she is run over by a bus and killed.

With Denny's support, Manson gradually overcomes the grief from his wife's death. However, his accusation against the incompetent London surgeon brings reprisals that threaten Manson's career. Earlier, when one of his patients was losing her battle with tuberculosis, he sought out an American specialist, Richard Stillman, who was staying in England but did not have a British MD. Manson drove his patient to Stillman's clinic to receive an experimental treatment that involved inducing pneumothorax (collapsing an affected lung with nitrogen). The treatment was successful, the patient recovered, but Manson's London-based enemies seized on Stillman's lack of credentials, and reported Manson to the General Medical Council (GMC).

Despite his lawyer's gloomy predictions about the GMC hearing, Manson forcefully and passionately justifies his actions and is not struck off the medical register. The novel ends with him visiting the grave of his wife. As he turns to catch a train destined for the West Midlands town where he is embarking on his new medical endeavour, he notices that "in the sky before him, a bank of cloud lay brightly, bearing the shape of battlements".

== Characters ==
=== Part I: Blaenelly ===
- Dr. Andrew Manson, the protagonist
- Christine Manson (née Barlow), the Drineffy (Blaenelly) schoolteacher who marries Manson at the end of Part I
- Dr. Edward Page, a gentle, simple and hardworking doctor, to whom Andrew was brought in as assistant. Dr. Page is a bachelor who has overworked himself in the unswerving pursuit of duty. When Manson arrives, he finds Dr. Page bedridden following a stroke.
- Miss Blodwen Page, Dr. Page's unmarried sister and the controller of her brother's medical practise in the wake of his health issues
- Dr. Nicolls, described as a "tight little money-chasing midwife" by his assistant Denny
- Dr. Philip Denny, a self-proclaimed "Sawbones" - a gruff but amicable doctor who shares Manson's disregard for aspects of the contemporary healthcare system, and who becomes close with Manson over time
- Dr. Bramwell, nicknamed the Lung Buster, is a Drineffy doctor described as cordial, but naive and ignorant. His practise is not extensive, and does not permit the luxury of an assistant.
- Mrs. Gladys Bramwell, his adulterous wife
- Dai Jenkins, dispenser at Drineffy
- Annie, kitchen maid at Page's
- Olwen & Emlyn Hughes
- Dr. Griffiths, lazy, evasive, incompetent district Medical Officer at Toniglan
- Glyn Morgan, Councillor for Drineffy
- Aneurin Rees, bank manager and Miss Page's sweetheart
- Joe Morgan & Susan Morgan

=== Part II: Aberalaw ===
- Dr. Idris Llewellyn
- Dr. Urquhart
- Dr. Medley
- Dr. Oxborrow
- Ed Chenkin, a miner at Aberalaw
- Ben Chenkin, a miner at Aberalaw
- Thomas Evans, a miner at Aberalaw who loses the use of his left arm through an accident at home
- Con Boland, the dentist of Aberalaw
- Nurse Lloyd, the district nurse
- Mr. & Mrs. Vaughan
- Mr. Owen, the secretary to Aberalaw Medical Aid Society

=== Part III: CMFB ===
- Gill Jones
- Dr. Hope
- Dr. Maurice Gadsby
- Sir Robert Abby

=== Part IV: Private Practise ===
- Frau Schmidt
- Dr. Frederick "Freddie" Hamson
- Dr. Ivory
- Dr. Deedman
- Harry Vidler & Mrs. Vidler
- Richard Stillman, an American tuberculosis specialist who doesn't have a medical degree
- Frances Lawrence
- Hopper
- Mary Boland
- Nurse Sharp
- Nurse Trent
- Dr. Thoroughgood
- Mr. Boon

== Reception ==
The novel stirred controversy with its criticisms of the British medical establishment. The reviewer in the Birmingham Gazette wrote: "When the tumult and the shouting that have greeted this book's appearance die, it will remain not only a great novel, but the most notable contribution to medical controversy since Shaw's Doctor's Dilemma. In The Manchester Guardian, Harold Brighouse stated: "This novel is more serious in its content than some of its predecessors and is written with a sense of responsibility." Other reviews chose to defend the existing medical system and its physicians. For example, The Times Literary Supplement argued against The Citadel's portrayal of greedy, complacent doctors: "Cronin does not give enough prominence to county and municipal officers all over the country who care less for fees than healing, GPs who live devoted and anxious lives with only fourteen days away per year from the clamorous telephone by day and night and Harley Street doctors who could stand beside Lister without shame."

In The New York Times Book Review, Alfred Kazin was harsh in his appraisal of the novel, comparing it unfavorably to Sinclair Lewis's Arrowsmith (1925), and asserting that Cronin had "first-hand ideas and second-hand skill". Kazin went on to say about The Citadel author:

one is excited by his great moral earnestness, his flat insistence on facing the central problems of British economy and culture; but as the book goes on that earnestness becomes a whispered indignation, almost a doggedly pessimistic insistence on the tones of dourness. Characters are added to each other faithfully; the action is blocked out; the story moves along, sometimes with inordinate rapidity; but always, despite one's interest, despite the automatic pleasure taken in "a good story", the end result seems trivial.

The Citadel was popular in translation, being sold in many countries, even in book shops in the Third Reich; the scholar and Holocaust survivor Victor Klemperer noted about Nazi Germany in 1944: "English novels are banned of course; but there are books by A. J. Cronin in every shop window: he's Scottish and exposes shortcomings of social and public services in England." After the Second World War, the novel proved popular in Communist bloc countries, where Cronin was one of the few contemporary British authors to be published.

== Adaptations ==
The novel was made into a 1938 film with Robert Donat, Rosalind Russell, Ralph Richardson and Rex Harrison. TV adaptations included one American (1960), two British (1960 and 1983), and two Italian (1964 and 2003). There were also three film adaptations in Indian languages: Tere Mere Sapne (1971) in Hindi, Jiban Saikate (1972) in Bengali, and Madhura Swapnam (1982) in Telugu.

In 2017, a condensed adaptation by Christopher Reason was featured on BBC Radio 4 as a 15-minute drama. In June 2021, a longer radio adaptation was broadcast by Radio 4 as two 45-minute episodes, written by Christopher Reason and Tom Needham.
