= The Citadel (1983 TV series) =

British television series

- Directed by: Peter Jefferies; Mike Vardy
- Starring: Ben Cross; Clare Higgins; Tenniel Evans; Gareth Thomas
- Music by: Michael Stuckey
- Country of origin: United Kingdom
- No. of episodes: 10

Production
- Running time: 50 mins

Original release
- Network: BBC1
- Release: 20 January – 24 March 1983

The Citadel is a 1983 BBC television adaptation written by Don Shaw from A. J. Cronin's 1937 novel The Citadel. It was produced by Ken Riddington. The drama was directed by Peter Jefferies and Mike Vardy.

The BBC dramatisation stars Ben Cross as Dr. Andrew Manson and Clare Higgins as Christine Manson. It was broadcast in the United States from November 1983 until January 1984 by PBS television as part of Masterpiece Theatre.

== Cast ==
- Ben Cross as Dr. Andrew Manson
- David Gwillim as David Hope
- Clare Higgins as Christine Barlow
- Tenniel Evans as Dr. Page
- Gareth Thomas as Dr. Philip Denny
- Michael Cochrane as Freddie Hamson
- Cynthia Grenville as Blodwen Page
- Colin Baker as Richard Vaughan
- Jane How as Mrs. Vaughan
- Tim Wylton as Ben Chenkin
- Don Fellows as Richard Stillman
- Beryl Nesbitt as Annie Hughes
- John Nettleton as Charles Ivory
- Raymond Bowers as Dr. Llewellyn
- Dilys Price as Mrs. Llewellyn
- David Pugh as Joe Morgan
- Dyfed Thomas as Dai Jenkins
- Jack Walters as Old Thomas
- Richard Davies as Dr. Watkins
- Janet Davies as Mrs. Watkins
- Carmen du Sautoy as Frances Lawrence
- Avril Elgar as Nurse Sharp
- Oliver Ford Davies as Reverend Parry
- Michael Gough as Sir Jenner Halliday
- Charles Kay as Mr. Hopper
- Buster Merryfield as Professor Challis
- John Welsh as Sir Robert Abbey

== Episode summaries ==
Episode 1: Dr. Andrew Manson, a 24 year old Scottish doctor newly qualified from St. Andrew's Medical School, travels to his first professional appointment – medical assistant to General Practitioner Dr. Page in Drineffy, a fictitious Welsh mining community. Dr. Page's sister Blodwen is managing her brother's practice as, to Andrew's horror, Dr. Page is incapacitated following a stroke. Andrew quickly becomes disillusioned with a chaotic medical system that lacks any national structure and is driven by the financial motives of senior doctors. His first encounters with Christine Barlow, a schoolmistress, and with Dr. Philip Denny, a semi-alcoholic medical assistant at a neighbouring practice, are both unfavourable. The conclusion of the episode sees Andrew and Philip forced to take matters into their own hands by blowing up a contaminated water source responsible for a local typhoid outbreak.

Episode 2: The Morgans, married almost twenty years, are expecting their first child and they ask Andrew to oversee the latter stages of the pregnancy. Andrew requests his overdue pay from Blodwen, who meets his request as an accusation. Christine invites Andrew to supper, and she is sympathetic to Andrew's idealistic approach to his work. He informs her that he is annoyed by the fact that too many doctors treat individual symptoms without attempting to understand and treat the underlying cause. Emlyn Hughes, a patient of Dr. Bramwell's, displays uncharacteristic violent behaviour and Bramwell diagnoses homicidal mania. Bramwell informs Andrew that he needs the signature of a second doctor in order to have Emlyn certified and sent to an asylum, but Andrew challenges the diagnosis and instead observes that Emlyn's problems can all be attributed to untreated hypothyroidism which can be easily treated with thyroid injections. Blodwen Page is informed of attempts to encourage Andrew to set up his own practice. Andrew has no knowledge of this, and in surprise agrees to her demands that he promise never to set up in opposition to her brother Dr. Page. Blodwen stubbornly refuses to accept that her brother will not recover. Andrew invites Christine to attend the British Medical Union conference in Cardiff, where they dine with Andrew's friend from medical school Dr. Freddie Hamson. Christine later informs Andrew that she disliked Freddie for his patronising and superior manner towards Andrew, and on their return to Drineffy that evening they part on negative terms although Christine does agree to see Andrew again. That night Andrew is summoned to the Morgans' home where Mrs. Morgan is in labour. The midwife is already there, and after the birth she declares the baby boy to be stillborn. However, Andrew successfully revives the baby.

Episode 3: The Morgans give Andrew a personal gift of five guineas following his resuscitation of their newborn son, before they promptly emigrate to South Africa. Andrew opens a bank account and deposits the gift, but the bank manager, suspecting some irregularity, informs Blodwen who then accuses Andrew of stealing from Dr. Page. She refuses to believe Andrew that it was a personal gift, and the Morgans have already departed for South Africa so cannot be called upon to validate his claim. Andrew, enraged, threatens to sue her and accuses the bank manager of breaching client confidentiality. Then he quits his job. He attends an interview for a job as medical assistant for the Medical Aid Society in another mining town with the fictitious name of Aberalaw – a larger town which, unlike Drineffy, has its own hospital. The Society's committee informs him that they are impressed with his candidacy but that the large house that comes with the position is unsuitable for a single man. Andrew immediately informs the committee that he is engaged and due to be married in a fortnight, so he is offered the job. When he candidly explains the situation to Christine she is upset, but when he informs her that he loves her and his motive for marrying her is a sincere one she admits that she loves him too. They quickly marry. Their wedding gift from Philip Denny is his microscope, his most precious possession, and Andrew realises what a good friend Philip has been. On the evening of their arrival at Aberalaw, which happens to be the same day on which they married, they are invited to dine with the senior doctor Dr. Llewellyn. During dinner Dr. Llewellyn explains that Andrew, the other three medical assistants, and the dentist in the town are expected to pay Dr. Llewellyn 20% of their earnings. After dinner Andrew informs Christine that he strongly objects to having to pay Dr. Llewellyn a share of his own income since Dr. Llewellyn is already very highly paid by the Society. The episode concludes with the newly married couple retiring to bed.

Episode 4: At Andrew's first clinic in Aberalaw most of his patients attend simply to have sick certificates issued. He issues some, but refuses Ben Chenkin who has been receiving such certificates for years for nystagmus which he claims to have acquired whilst working in the mines. Andrew informs Chenkin that his only malady is an over-indulgence of alcohol. Chenkin's son is on the committee, but Andrew resists pressure to reverse his decision. Ben Chenkin returns to take away his card (a doctor's pay is gauged according to how many patients are on his books, so when a patient removes his card he is removing himself from that doctor's books and depriving him of income). Others follow Chenkin's example and also take their cards away from Andrew. However, Mr Owen, secretary of the Society, calls to the Mansons' home and informs Andrew that he is not currently registered with a doctor but now wishes to give his card to Andrew. Andrew resents the fact that Dr. Llewellyn will not permit any medical assistants to see patients in the hospital, reserving that privilege for himself. Andrew observes a link between anthracite mining and lung disease and suspects that silica is to blame, but there is no medical literature on the subject. Andrew intends to investigate this further, since, if confirmed scientifically, it would enable those workers who are affected to seek compensation. Although Andrew and Christine have money troubles, their marriage is a happy one. At a dinner party hosted by a wealthy mine proprietor the Mansons are introduced to Professor Challis. Over dinner Andrew is encouraged to discuss his research. At home afterwards Andrew complains bitterly about the elitist attitudes and hypocrisy of their fellow diners. Andrew befriends Con Boland, a jovial Irish dentist and family man with five children. Andrew gains Con's support and hopes to gain the support of the other three medical assistants in his mission to refuse to pay Dr. Llewellyn 20% of their income.

Episode 5: Andrew informs Dr Llewellyn that he intends to meet with the other medical assistants that evening and that he expects them to join forces in refusing to pay 20% of their income to him. However, to Andrew's dismay, during the meeting that follows he fails to gain the necessary support from his fellow medical assistants. In his despair at the hopelessness of his situation, Christine convinces Andrew to study for the M.R.C.P. qualification offering to help him with the language proficiency requirements. The arduous combination of work and study is stressful to Andrew, who takes his frustrations out on Christine. However, he travels to London and sits the examinations where his oral examiners are Sir Robert Abbey and Dr. Maurice Gadsby (both of whom feature again later in the series). He passes. Immediately on his return from London he is called to an accident in the mine, where, under dangerous and challenging circumstances, he amputates the trapped leg of a miner. Christine informs Andrew that she is pregnant. One morning, five months into her pregnancy, she mentions to Andrew that she is worried about the state of the bridge, and Andrew promises to ask the committee to do something about it. However, the bridge collapses when Christine is crossing it. Whilst Christine does not appear to suffer significant injuries to herself, she miscarries the baby and Dr. Llewellyn informs Andrew that she is unlikely to ever bear another child. Andrew's research into silicosis in anthracite workers is progressing well, and he applies for an M.D. on the basis of his thesis. His experiments involve testing silica on [guinea pigs, and there are local complaints about vivisection for which Andrew has no licence. An official from the Society for Prevention of Cruelty to Animals comes and seizes the guinea pigs, and Andrew is brought before the local Committee under threat of dismissal. In his defence Andrew informs the committee that the blood they reported to have seen in his home laboratory was simply a chemical that he had spilt. He compares the continued use of white mice and canaries down the mine to his use of guinea pigs – both examples of sacrificing the lives of animals to save those of humans. Furthermore, he states that if his research is successful then miners and their families who suffer because of silicosis would have the benefit of receiving compensation. The committee votes, and the majority decision is that he should stay in his role. Andrew's response is to resign his position. He informs Christine that they will live in London instead.

Episode 6: Professor Challis, whom Andrew had met and impressed at a dinner party in Wales some years earlier, uses his influence as a member of The Coal and Metalliferous Mines Fatigue Board to have Andrew employed there as their first full-time medical officer with the expectation that Andrew's role will be to continue his research into the effects of anthracites, including making visits to anthracite mines all over the country. However, on his first day Andrew befriends the affable Dr. David Hope, a laboratory expert employed by the Board, who informs Andrew that the Board intends Andrew to travel around the country's mines counting bandages for at least the first six months of his employment there. This is confirmed at a meeting of the Board where the chairman's deciding vote finalises the decision. Unwilling to accept this, Andrew instead decides to set up his own G.P. practice in London. However, such is the financial greed of the medical profession, that it quickly becomes apparent that he cannot afford to buy any decent practice. After two months of searching in vain David Hope informs Andrew that a Dr. Foy has died and his practice in Paddington would be much cheaper because Dr. Foy, having been ill for a number of years, had allowed the practice to become run-down. The practice and attached house are in a poor state, and for many months Andrew has very few patients. His humiliation is highlighted by obliging for a fee a prostitute who simply wants him to pierce her ears. Andrew confides in David Hope that he is very worried about their financial situation. It is clear that Christine is unhappy in London, and when Andrew suggests that they consider adoption Christine responds that she could never bear to raise a child in a London such is her distaste for the city. Andrew's spirits are lifted by the arrival of a letter from Robert Stillman, an American expert on lung diseases with a successful clinic in Portland, Oregon, who is writing to praise Andrew's research into silicosis. Stillman is a physicist but not a qualified medical doctor, yet is very highly regarded in America. Andrew meets Freddie Hamson in a pub and asks for his help in making better contacts to boost his finances. Freddie invites them to dine at his home, to Christine's annoyance since she doesn't like Freddie. Among the other dinner guests are Charles Ivory, a surgeon, and Freddie jovially explains that he sends patients to Ivory for operations and they both extract a fee as a gimmick to extract as much money as possible from their prosperous patients. They laugh at Andrew's reference to medical journals declaring that they don't bother to read medical journals or to keep up to date with medical and scientific matters. On returning home Christine says that she hated the evening and their fellow diners' focus on money. They argue and sleep in separate bedrooms. Andrew is resentful that he is better qualified than any of the other men at the dinner, and he asserts his determination to make a lot of money.

Episode 7: Miss Martha Cramb, who is not a regular patient of Andrew's, attends his practice one day in desperation, seeking treatment for a rash on her hands. She informs him that she has seen many other doctors who prescribed various medicines and ointments but to no effect. Andrew informs her that the solution is simply one of adopting a special diet. This advice is successful and Miss Cramb promises to recommend him to the other girls who work with her at a very fashionable upper class London dress shop. As a result, Andrew sees several more prosperous patients. One day Miss Cramb calls him to an emergency at the store – Toppy Le Roy (daughter of the millionaire food manufacturer Joe Le Roy) has had an unusual seizure in the shop. Accompanying her and her friend Frances Lawrence home, Andrew learns that the seizure was faked because Toppy was not satisfied with the service she received that day in the dress shop. Meanwhile, David Hope informs Andrew that Sir Robbert Abbey is seeking to appoint someone to see patients at the Victoria Chest Hospital. Andrew is very eager to acquire a hospital position in addition to his G.P. practice, so he meets with Sir Abbey and is offered the position. By now Andrew's idealism has been replaced by financial motivation, much to Christine's distress, and he now offers treatments to patients that he would have dismissed as useless a year earlier simply to be able to extract more money from them. He coerces Christine into becoming his dispenser, although she is not qualified to do so, to enable Andrew to see more patients and make more money. Freddie Hamson sends one of his patients to Andrew for a chest consultation, simply to enable Andrew to extract a very large fee. He lies about this to Christine, who discovers the truth when the cheque arrives in the post. Frances Lawrence phones to invite Andrew to a lunch on Wednesday where he will have the opportunity to meet Joe Le Roy. Despite Wednesday being Christine's birthday, Andrew chooses to attend the lunch but Joe Le Roy is away in Scotland so it is a society lunch rather than a business lunch, yet Andrew has not brought Christine. At the lunch Frances informs Andrew that he needs to buy himself a car, just as any self-respecting doctor would. When he gets home he lies to Christine (for the second time) about having met Joe Le Roy. This lie is revealed when, a few days later, Frances phones and asks Christine to inform Andrew that she has finally tracked down Joe Le Roy in Scotland and he is interested in hiring Andrew as a company doctor to promote his product Cremogen about which he wishes to make unfounded claims of its health benefits. Andrew buys new suits and a car to add to his prestige and impress his prosperous patients. He takes Christine on a picnic to the countryside in the car, to her initial delight, but the day goes badly. Christine informs Andrew bitterly that a citadel is "a castle on a hill, something you take by assault, by hurting people." She does not want luxuries if it means losing the Andrew that once was. He defends his actions angrily, and their day is ruined.

Episode 8: Andrew arranges to meet Robert Stillman at the club. Stillman informs Andrew that he is opening a new T.B. sanitarium (the Bellevue) in the countryside of High Wycombe, Buckinghamshire. Seeing them, Freddie quietly warns Andrew not to be seen associating with Stillman since the medical profession in England is extremely prejudiced against this American who practices medicine yet is not medically qualified. Freddie and his elitist medical associates convince Andrew to open a clinic in Welbeck Street/Harley Street to cater for a more prosperous class of patients. Dr. Philip Denny, who Andrew befriended when he worked in Drineffy, calls to their house in Andrew's absence and talks to Christine. He no longer drinks. They both confide that they are worried about the recent change in Andrew and the poor company he now keeps. On Andrew's return, when Christine attempts to discuss the concerns she shares with Philip, Andrew angrily accuses her of plotting behind his back and tells her never to mention Philip's name in the house again. Frances Lawrence advises Andrew on how to decorate his new rooms in Welbeck Street, and Freddie finds a suitable nurse for him in the form of "battle-axe" Nurse Sharp. Andrew takes Christine for lunch to the Plaza, but she is unimpressed. He scolds her for revealing her Yorkshire working class prejudices. She insists that they leave the restaurant, and then she leaves for her native Yorkshire, needing some time to think. In her absence Andrew begins an affair with Frances Lawrence, who informs him that the problem with his marriage is that it is a traditional one unlike her liberal modern marriage. In his guilt Andrew phones Yorkshire, but then hangs up and continues with the affair. Con Boland, the dentist from Aberalaw, visits Andrew to appeal for help for his daughter Mary who is suffering from T.B. Andrew arranges for Mary to be admitted to the Victoria Chest Hospital in London, where he works, under Dr. Thoroughgood. On Christine's return she is delighted to see Con, and confides in him regarding her concerns about Andrew. Andrew ends his affair with Frances Lawrence. Andrew is visited in his rooms by the elderly Mrs. Vidler, whose husband has a large abdominal cyst. Andrew arranges for his elitist associate, Mr. Charles Ivory, Surgeon, to operate with Andrew assisting as anaesthetist. Ivory botches the operation, and while Mr. Vidler is bleeding to death Ivory rapidly sews up the body, cynically declaring that since the body was closed at the moment of death there is no need for an inquest. Andrew overhears Ivory untruthfully informing Mrs. Vidler, the widow, that it was a kindness that he had died as he did, for death was inevitable even had he survived the operation such was the severity of his underlying morbidity. Ivory has lied and deceived to cover his errors, and it is now apparent to Andrew that Ivory is both surgically incompetent and entirely untrustworthy and unethical. Andrew confronts Ivory and accuses him of murder. This tragedy has been an epiphany for Andrew.

Episode 9: Andrew, on returning home, breaks down as he explains to Christine what has happened. They reconcile, and Andrew informs Christine that he can no longer bear to live in London. He suggests teaming up with Philip Denny and David Hope in a practice in a country town, with Philip contributing his skills as a surgeon and David contributing his skills as a bacteriologist. The idea for such a collaboration was inspired by Robert Stillman's descriptions of such enterprises emerging in America. Andrew decides that the Victoria Chest Hospital is not the best place for Mary Boland to be treated, and Dr Thoroughgood is refusing to see the merit in Andrew's suggestion that she needs a pneumothorax induced in order to rest the diseased lung. Thoroughgood is reluctant to adopt such modern techniques. Andrew and Christine drive to the Bellevue sanitarium to meet Stillman, who informs them that he has a very long waiting list. However, Stillman soon agrees to Andrew's request to accept Mary Boland under his care. In his Welbeck Street clinic, Andrew confesses to his wealthy patients that he has been providing them with unnecessary treatments because it is all too easy "to take money from rich hypochondriacs". He pays Nurse Sharp a month's salary in lieu of notice, as he cancels his patients and closes his clinic immediately. He asks Nurse Sharp, however, to accompany him on Thursday when moving Mary Boland from the Victoria Chest Hospital to the Bellevue sanitarium. Mary Boland is successfully transferred, and Stillman declares that Mary's lung should have been immobilised weeks ago. Nurse Sharp is disturbed that Stillman is not a qualified doctor, and she makes her objections very clear to Andrew. The happiness in Andrew's and Christine's marriage is restored, and they both discuss adoption with enthusiasm. Andrew resists further attempts by Freddie to collude, much to Freddie's disgust. Freddie and his medical cronies (including Charles Ivory) meet in the club to discuss Andrew's association with Stillman, and they endeavour to forward the details to the General Medical Council so that Andrew can be struck off the medical register. Freddie seems hesitant, but does nothing to block the proposed action. Philip and David visit Andrew and Christine, and both are keen to proceed with Andrew's proposed joint venture. They plan to visit some prospective locations the following day. On the following morning Christine tells Andrew that she needs to briefly go to the local delicatessen before Andrew leaves for the railway station. Minutes later a policeman comes to the door to inform Andrew that Christine ran out the door of the delicatessen in front of a bus and was killed. Philip cares for Andrew in his grief. On the day after Christine's tragic death Freddie visits, and Philip admits him to the house, but, on seeing Andrew in his grief, Freddie immediately leaves. Meanwhile, despite his bereavement, proceedings against Andrew proceed without Andrew's knowledge.

Episode 10: A month after Christine's death, by which time Andrew appears to have emerged from his deepest grief thanks to Philip's diligent care, a letter arrives from the General Medical Council summoning Andrew to a hearing in relation to his professional cooperation with Robert Stillman. Andrew hires Mr. Hopper as his legal defence, since he has previously successfully led a defence at the G.M.C. However, Mr. Hopper is very pessimistic regarding Andrew's chances of success since it is clear that Andrew was fully aware that Stillman was unqualified. Philip and Mr. Hopper both urge Andrew to agree to Mary Boland being called as a witness, but Andrew is adamant that it would put her under too much strain. Mr. Hopper only agrees to take Andrew's case on the understanding that during the hearing Andrew promises to only answers yes or no, and to avoid making any passionate outbursts. Con Boland visits Andrew, having been informed by Philip about the forthcoming G.M.C. hearing. Con assures Andrew that Mary is now fully recovered and will be discharged from Bellevue the day before the hearing. Furthermore, Con insists that Mary will be testifying on Andrew's behalf. The day of the hearing arrives. The charge is that on 5 March 1931 Andrew assisted Stillman, an unqualified individual, in performing a pneumothorax on Mary Boland. The prosecuting solicitor, Mr. Boon, states that the case is straightforward and that Andrew should be removed from the medical register. Nurse Sharp, called as a witness, testifies against Andrew, stating that she was deeply disturbed by the knowledge that Stillman was unqualified. Dr. Thoroughgood, whose patient Mary Boland had been prior to her self-discharge from the Victoria Chest Hospital, is also a witness. He confirms that Andrew had implored him to perform a pneumothorax on Mary Boland, but that he had refused to do so, and conceded that Andrew's subsequent actions – those actions which have resulted in this hearing – only came about because of Thoroughgood's refusal. Mary Boland, whose arrival is delayed due to mechanical problems with her father's car, finally takes the witness stand and appeals on Andrew's behalf, but Mr. Boon succeeds in weakening her testimony under his scrutiny. Andrew is called as the final witness and his evidence also appears insufficient to win his case. However, just as he is dismissed from the witness stand he makes a passionate statement – despite his promise to Mr. Hopper that he would refrain from doing so. In his statement Andrew points out that Stillman has done more to tackle T.B. than any other person in this country, yet he is demonised and cast out by the medical profession. However, Pasteur and Ehrlich, whose contributions are now highly regarded by the medical profession, were also unqualified. Likewise Robert Koch, who in his day was ridiculed by Rudolf Virchow. Andrew then declares that when he first qualified he had no useful knowledge, and this is because the system is rotten. He adds that there needs to be post graduate courses for doctors, and that if Mary Boland had remained at the Victoria Chest Hospital then it is his opinion that she would still be suffering from active T.B. – not due to the faults of Dr. Thoroughgood but rather due to the flaws of the existing medical system. The council retire to consider Andrew's case, and return with a majority verdict in favour of Andrew. The episode/series concludes with Andrew visiting Christine's grave prior to travelling with Philip and David to their new joint venture in a country town.

== Filming locations ==
The program was partly filmed on location in Tredegar, Wales, where A. J. Cronin practised as a doctor with the Tredegar Medical Aid Society prior to writing the novel, as well as in Merthyr Tydfil, Garlane House in Beaufort, Blaenau Gwent, in Wales and Prague. His experience with the Tredegar Medical Aid Society shaped the "Aberalaw" section of the novel.

== Reception ==
Writing for The New York Times, John J. O'Connor noted "Manson is played to grim but winning perfection by Ben Cross", and wrote the series "holds up remarkably well as a story and drama."
