= Dark Journey (1937 film) =

1937 British film by Victor Saville

- Theatrical release poster
- Directed by: Victor Saville
- Written by: Arthur Wimperis
- Screenplay by: Lajos Bíró
- Produced by: Victor Saville; Alexander Korda
- Starring: Conrad Veidt; Vivien Leigh; Joan Gardner
- Cinematography: Georges Périnal; Harry Stradling Sr.
- Edited by: Hugh Stewart; Lionel Hoare
- Music by: Richard Addinsell
- Production company: London Film Productions
- Distributed by: United Artists
- Release date: 28 March 1937
- Running time: 77 minutes
- Country: United Kingdom
- Languages: English; German

Dark Journey is a 1937 British spy film directed by Victor Saville and starring Conrad Veidt, Vivien Leigh and Joan Gardner Written by Lajos Bíró and Arthur Wimperis, the film is about two secret agents on opposite sides during World War I who meet and fall in love in neutral Stockholm.

It was shot at Denham Studios, with sets designed by the art director Andrej Andrejew assisted by Ferdinand Bellan. The film's costumes were by René Hubert.

== Plot ==
In the spring of 1918, the final year of World War I, a German U-boat stops a Dutch freighter on its way to Stockholm in neutral Sweden. The Germans board the ship, identify one man as a Belgian spy, and take him prisoner. One of the passengers questioned is attractive Swiss dress shop owner Madeleine Goddard, who is returning from a business trip to Paris, where she purchased dresses for her boutique.

In Stockholm, Madeleine, who is a German spy, provides information to her contacts on Allied troop movements she acquired in Paris. The information is cleverly concealed in the gowns she bought. While the Germans believe that she is one of their top spies, Madeleine is in fact a French double agent working to uncover the identity of the new German secret service leader in Stockholm.

Soon after, a German war veteran named Baron Karl Von Marwitz enters Sweden. He claims to have left the German Navy because of war injuries, but some of his former colleagues believe he is a deserter. One night, Madeleine goes to a nightclub accompanied by her friend, English MI6 agent Bob Carter. She notices Von Marwitz playing a bar room game predicting what girls will say after he kisses them. After she exposes the trick, Von Marwitz becomes intrigued by Madeleine. The next day he visits her shop with Lupita, the Brazilian socialite he tricked the previous evening. After the temperamental Lupita leaves, Von Marwitz begins asking Madeleine to go out with him. In the coming days, she continues to refuse his requests, even after he offers to purchase all the stock in her shop. When he finally gives up, she gives in and agrees to date him.

Madeleine and Von Marwitz begin seeing each other socially, and despite their differences, they fall deeply in love. Von Marwitz even proposes marriage. Their whirlwind romance is interrupted one night when Madeleine's German co-conspirator, Anatole Bergen, is murdered. Madeleine meets with her German contacts who inform her that the recent information she provided proved disastrous for the German Army. She is ordered to return to Paris immediately and investigate her French contacts. When Madeleine reaches Paris, she is met by a high-ranking French official who presents her with the Médaille militaire. Despite her reluctance to continue her work in Stockholm, she is ordered to return.

Back in Stockholm, Madeleine tells Von Marwitz that she knows he is the leader of the German secret service. In response, he reveals that he knows that she is in fact a French spy. Although relieved that they can finally speak honestly with each other, they acknowledge that their dream of a life together can never happen. Soon after, Madeleine turns to her friend Bob for protection, now that her true identity is known to the Germans. While Bob plans her escape from Stockholm, Von Marwitz plans her capture. The next day, Bob arranges for Madeleine to be arrested by the Stockholm police, ruining Von Marwitz's plan to capture her quietly.

After Madeleine is deported, her ship is stopped by a German U-boat in neutral waters. Von Marwitz boards the ship and arrests Madeleine. As they are being rowed to the U-boat, a British Q-ship (a heavily armed merchant ship with concealed weaponry) approaches and sinks the U-boat. Madeleine is taken aboard the Q-ship, while von Marwitz is taken aboard a British destroyer. Madeleine is assured that von Marwitz will not be shot, but will instead be detained until the end of the war. As von Marwitz is rowed away, Madeleine calls out to him, "I'll be waiting."

== Cast ==
- Conrad Veidt as Baron Karl Von Marwitz
- Vivien Leigh as Madeleine
- Joan Gardner as Lupita
- Anthony Bushell as Bob Carter
- Ursula Jeans as Gertrude
- Margery Pickard as Colette
- Eliot Makeham as Anatole
- Austin Trevor as Dr. Muller
- Sam Livesey as Schaffer
- Edmund Willard as Chief of German Intelligence
- Charles Carson as Head of Fifth Bureau
- Phil Ray as Faber
- Henry Oscar as Swedish Magistrate
- Lawrence Hanray as Cottin
- Cecil Parker as Captain of Q-Boat
- Reginald Tate as Mate of Q-Boat
- Percy Walsh as Captain of Swedish Packet
- Robert Newton as Officer of U-boat
- William Dewhurst as The Killer
- Laidman Browne as Rugge
- M. Martin Harvey as Bohlau
- Anthony Holles as Dutchman

== Soundtrack ==
The music was composed by Richard Addinsell and orchestrated by Roy Douglas and Lionel Salter. The musical director was Muir Mathieson.

== Reception ==
Writing for The Spectator in 1937, Graham Greene gave the film a poor review, parodying Dante's warning with a warning for viewers to "Abandon life all ye who enter here" and asking readers what the film is about because it "certainly [does] not [reflect] life". Greene noted that director Saville is capable of good films, but claimed that this time he had been "defeated by the incredible naïvety of [the] script".

Still, with Veidt and Leigh, the film has bright spots. The sequence at The Grand Hotel in which Marwitz is slapped by Philip Ray playing Faber (Marwitz's “best friend” just released from POW confinement and believing Marwitz's cover of being a traitor) is superb, as Veidt quickly composes himself from outrage, rejecting a call to “demand satisfaction,” and follows Leigh to her room, easing the tension and embarrassment with his romantic interest with, “Madeleine, where is your sense of humour,” is classic—and Marwitz's untethered monocle remains in place notwithstanding the violence from Faber's blow
