= The Girl from Maxim's (1933 film) =

1933 film

- Directed by: Alexander Korda
- Written by: Harry Graham; Arthur Wimperis
- Based on: the play La Dame de chez Maxim by Georges Feydeau
- Produced by: Alexander Korda; Ludovico Toeplitz
- Starring: Leslie Henson; Frances Day; Stanley Holloway
- Cinematography: Georges Périnal
- Edited by: Harold Young (uncredited)
- Music by: Kurt Schröder; Niklos Schwalb
- Production company: London Film Productions
- Distributed by: United Artists Corporation (UK)
- Release date: 18 August 1933 (UK)
- Running time: 79 minutes
- Country: United Kingdom
- Language: English

The Girl from Maxim's is a 1933 British musical comedy film directed by Alexander Korda and starring Frances Day, Leslie Henson, Lady Tree and Stanley Holloway. It was an adaptation of the 1899 play La Dame de chez Maxim by Georges Feydeau. A French-language version was filmed at the same time under the title La dame de chez Maxim's.

== Plot ==
A doctor tries to pass off a singer as his wife in Paris in 1904.

== Cast ==
- Leslie Henson as Doctor Petypon
- Frances Day as La Mome
- George Grossmith, Jr. as The General
- Lady Tree as Madame Petypon
- Stanley Holloway as Mongicourt
- Gertrude Musgrove as Clementine
- Evan Thomas as Corignon
- Desmond Jeans as Etienne
- Hugh Dempster as The Duke
- Eric Portman as Uncredited

== Critical reception ==
TV Guide called it a "Dull British comedy."
