= Robert Donat =

English actor (1905–1958)

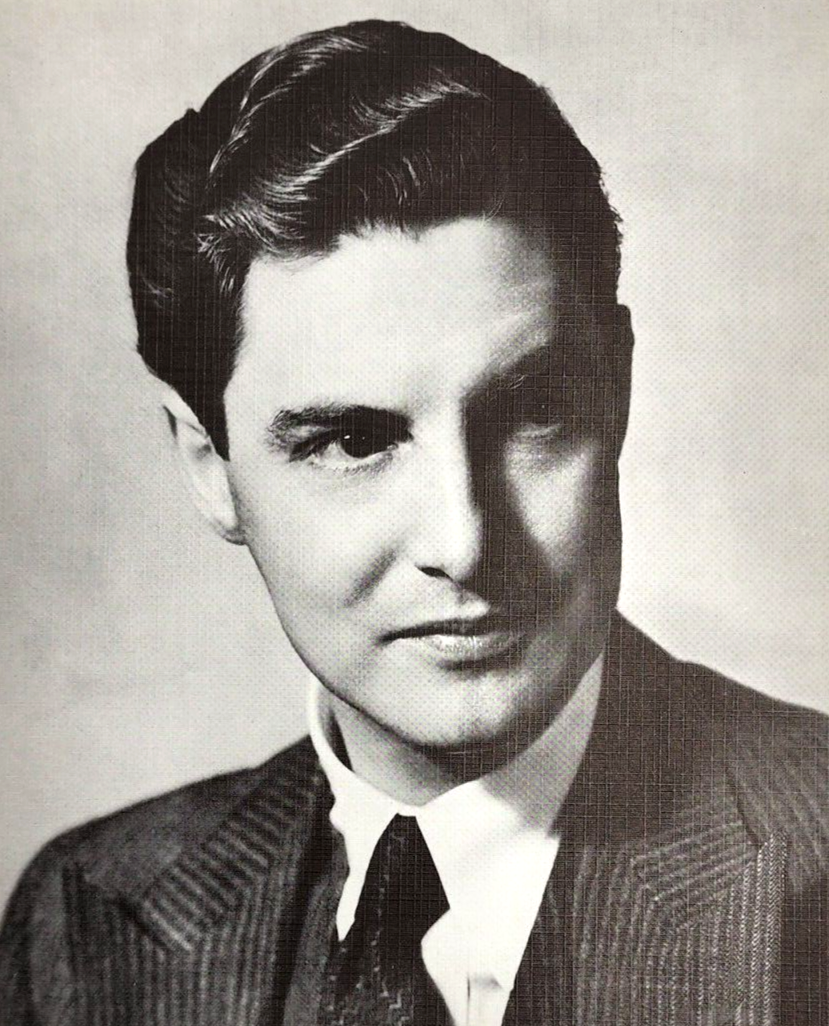
- Donat in 1935
- Born: Friedrich Robert Donat; 18 March 1905; Withington, Manchester, England
- Died: 9 June 1958 (aged 53); London, England
- Occupation: Actor
- Years active: 1921–1958
- Spouses: Ella Annesley (m. 1929; div. 1946) Renée Asherson (m. 1953)
- Children: 3
- Relatives: Peter Donat (nephew); Richard Donat (nephew)

Friedrich Robert Donat (/ˈdoʊnæt/ DOH-nat; 18 March 1905 – 9 June 1958) was an English actor. Making his breakthrough film role in Alexander Korda's The Private Life of Henry VIII (1933), today he is best remembered for his roles in The Count of Monte Cristo (1934), Alfred Hitchcock's The 39 Steps (1935), and Goodbye, Mr. Chips (1939), for which he won the Academy Award for Best Actor as the gentle English schoolmaster Mr. Chips.

Beginning his career in theatre, Donat made his stage debut in 1921 playing Lucius in Shakespeare's Julius Caesar, and in 1928 he appeared in productions at the Liverpool Playhouse, starring in plays by John Galsworthy, George Bernard Shaw among others, before moving to London in 1930. He appeared in the West End when he starred in A Sleeping Clergyman in 1933, and in 1936 he took on the management of the West End's Queen's Theatre.

In his book, The Age of the Dream Palace, Jeffrey Richards wrote that Donat was "British cinema's one undisputed romantic leading man in the 1930s". "The image he projected was that of the romantic idealist, often with a dash of the gentleman adventurer."

Donat suffered from chronic asthma, which affected his career and limited him to appearing in only 19 films.

== Early life ==
Friedrich Robert Donat was born and baptised in Withington, Manchester, the fourth and youngest son of Ernst Emil Donat, a civil engineer of German origin from Prussia, and his wife, Rose Alice Green. He was of English, Polish, German and French descent and was educated at Manchester Central Grammar School for Boys. His older brother was Philip Donat, father of actors Richard and Peter Donat.

To cope with a bad stammer, he took elocution lessons with James Bernard, a leading teacher of "dramatic interpretation". He left school at 15, working as Bernard's secretary to fund his continued lessons.

== Stage career ==
Donat made his first stage appearance in 1921, at the age of 16, with Henry Baynton's company at the Prince of Wales Theatre, Birmingham, playing Lucius in Julius Caesar. His break came in 1924 when he joined the company of Shakespearean actor Sir Frank Benson, where he stayed for four years.

In 1928, he began a year at the Liverpool Playhouse, starring in plays by John Galsworthy, George Bernard Shaw and Harold Brighouse, among others. In 1929, he played at the Festival Theatre in Cambridge under the direction of Tyrone Guthrie. He appeared in a number of plays, some with Flora Robson, and also directed.

In 1929, Donat married Ella Annesley Voysey (1903 West Bromwich, Staffordshire – 1994), the daughter of Rev. Ellison Annesley Voysey and Rachel Voysey née Enthoven. Ellison was the youngest son of the theist Rev. Charles Voysey. The couple had two sons and a daughter, but divorced in 1946.

In 1930, Donat and his wife moved to London, where he eventually made his debut in Knave and Quean at the Ambassadors Theatre. He received acclaim for a performance in a revival of Saint Joan.

In 1931, he achieved notice as Gideon Sarn in a dramatisation of the Mary Webb novel, Precious Bane, and he played various roles at the 1931 Malvern Festival. In the early 1930s, he was known in the industry as "screen test Donat" because of his many unsuccessful auditions for various film producers. MGM producer Irving Thalberg spotted him on the London stage in Precious Bane, and offered him a part in the 1932 film Smilin' Through, which he declined.

== Film appearances ==
Donat made his film debut in a quota quickie Men of Tomorrow (1932) for Alexander Korda's London Films. An abysmal screen test for Korda had ended with Donat's laughter. Reputedly, Korda reacted by exclaiming: "That's the most natural laugh I have ever heard in my life. What acting! Put him under contract immediately."

Korda cast Donat in the lead in That Night in London (1932), directed by Rowland V. Lee. He had a key role in Cash (1933), directed by Zoltan Korda, co-starring Edmund Gwenn. Donat's first great screen success came in his fourth film, playing Thomas Culpeper in The Private Life of Henry VIII (1933), also produced by Korda. The film, starring Charles Laughton in the title role, was an enormous success around the world.

At the 1933 Malvern Festival, Donat received good reviews for his performance in A Sleeping Clergyman, which transferred to the West End. He was also in Saint Joan. In 1934, he appeared in the West End stage production of Mary Read, opposite Flora Robson. In 1936, Donat took on the management of the West End's Queen's Theatre in Shaftesbury Avenue, where he produced Red Night by J. L. Hodson.

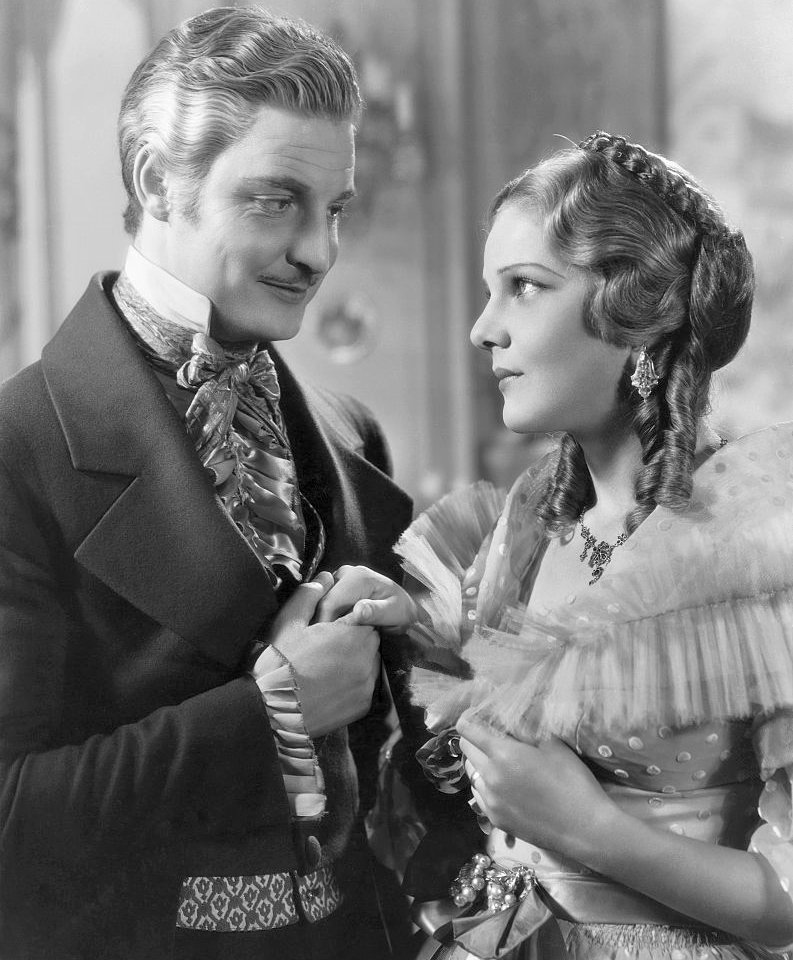
Donat and Elissa Landi in The Count of Monte Cristo (1934)

Korda loaned Donat to Edward Small for the only film Donat made in Hollywood, The Count of Monte Cristo (1934). In exchange, Leslie Howard was sent to Korda to make The Scarlet Pimpernel. The Count of Monte Cristo was successful and Donat was offered the lead role in a number of films for Warners, including Anthony Adverse (1935) and another swashbuckler, Captain Blood (1935). However, he did not like America and returned to Britain.

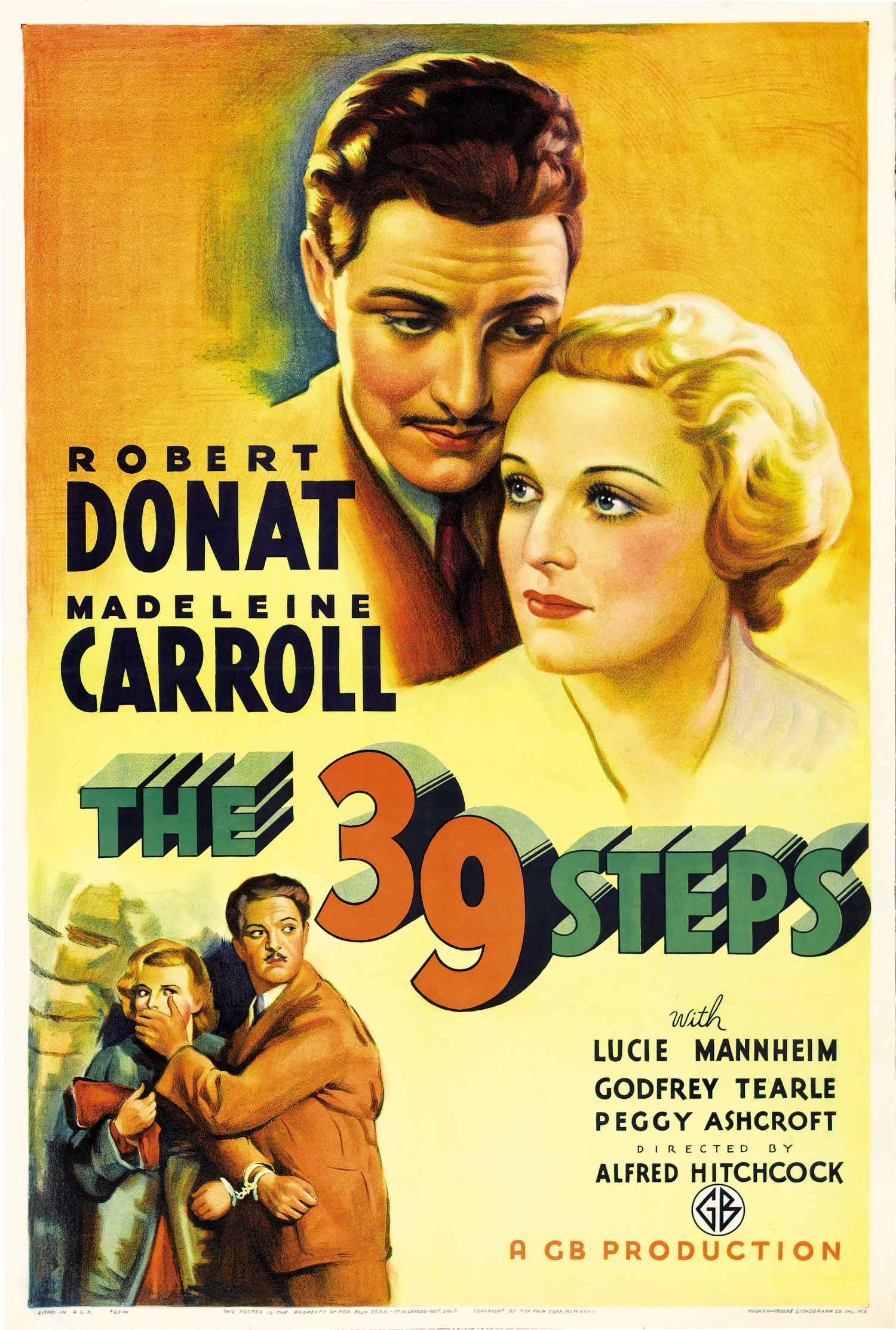
Theatrical release poster for The 39 Steps (1935)

In England, Donat had the star role in Alfred Hitchcock's The 39 Steps (1935) opposite Madeleine Carroll. His performance was well-received: "Mr. Donat, who has never been very well served in the cinema until now, suddenly blossoms out into a romantic comedian of no mean order", wrote the film critic C. A. Lejeune in The Observer at the time of the film's release. Lejeune observed that he possessed "an easy confident humour that has always been regarded as the perquisite of the American male star. For the first time on our screen we have the British equivalent of a Clark Gable or a Ronald Colman, playing in a purely national idiom. Mr. Donat, himself, I fancy, is hardly conscious of it, which is all to the good."

Hitchcock wanted Donat for the role of Edgar Brodie in Secret Agent (1936) and Detective Ted Spencer in Sabotage (1936), but this time Korda refused to release him. John Gielgud replaced him in Secret Agent, while John Loder took the role in Sabotage. MGM wanted him for Romeo and Juliet but he turned them down. Sam Goldwyn made several offers which were also turned down, as was an offer from David O. Selznick to appear in The Garden of Allah, and from Small to make The Son of Monte Cristo. Donat's next film was for Korda, The Ghost Goes West (1935), a comedy directed by René Clair.

Korda wanted Donat to make Hamlet. Instead, the actor appeared in Korda's Knight Without Armour (1937). Korda became committed to the latter project because of Donat's indecision. Madeleine Carroll had read the James Hilton novel while shooting The 39 Steps, and had persuaded Donat that it could be a good second film for them to star in together. Donat acquired the rights and passed them on to Korda, although Carroll was unavailable by then. His eventual co-star, Marlene Dietrich, was the source of much attention when she arrived in Britain. Donat was caught up in the furore, and the stress was so great that he suffered a nervous collapse a few days into the shooting and had to enter a nursing home. The production delay caused by Donat's asthma led to talk of replacing him. Dietrich, whose contract with Korda was for $450,000, threatened to leave the project if that happened, and production was halted for two months, until Donat was able to return to work. He planned to return to the U.S. in 1937 to make Clementine for Small at RKO but changed his mind, fearing legal reprisals from Warners.

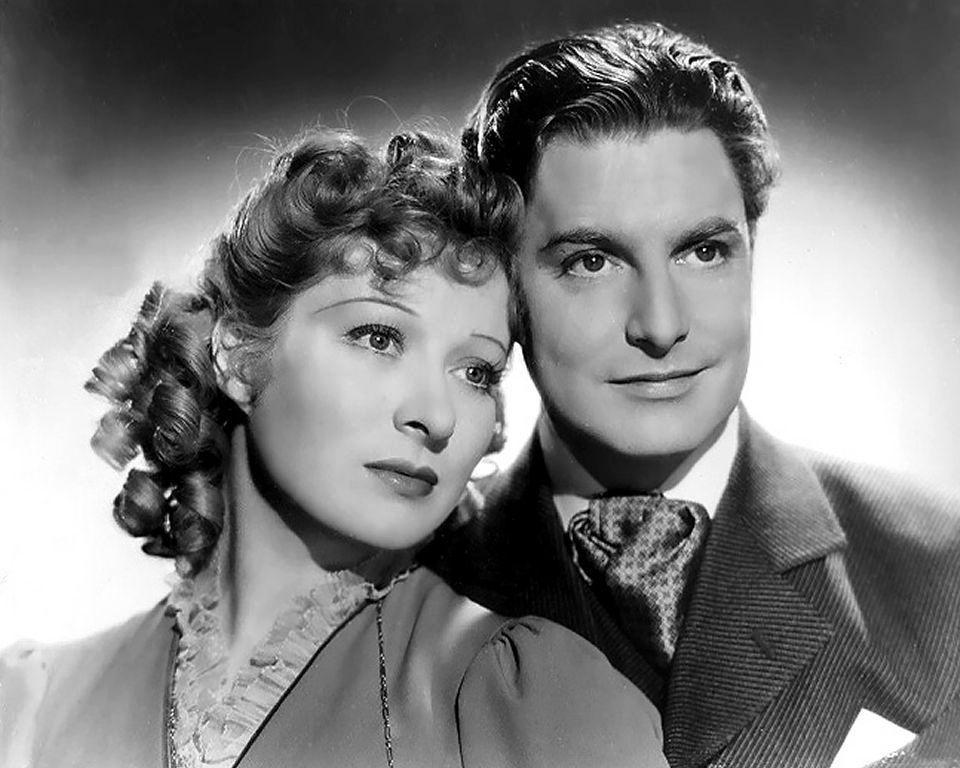
Promotional photograph of Greer Garson and Donat in Goodbye, Mr. Chips (1939)

In 1938, Donat signed a contract with MGM British for £150,000 with a six-film commitment. In The Citadel (1938), he played Andrew Manson, a newly qualified Scottish doctor, a role for which he received his first Best Actor Oscar nomination. He played in George Bernard Shaw's The Devil's Disciple (1938) on stage at the Piccadilly Theatre in London and the Old Vic.

Donat is best remembered for his role as the gentle English schoolmaster Mr. Chips in Goodbye, Mr. Chips (1939). He remarked: "As soon as I put the moustache on, I felt the part, even if I did look like a great airedale come out of a puddle." Australian film critic Brian McFarlane writes: "Class-ridden and sentimental perhaps, it remains extraordinarily touching in his Oscar-winning performance, and it ushers in the Donat of the postwar years." His rivals for the Best Actor Oscar were Clark Gable for Gone with the Wind, Laurence Olivier for Wuthering Heights, James Stewart for Mr. Smith Goes to Washington and Mickey Rooney for Babes in Arms.

== The Second World War ==
MGM wanted Donat to star in a movie about Beau Brummell and a new version of Pride and Prejudice but that was delayed by the war. During the early days of the Second World War Donat focused on the stage. He played three roles at the 1939 Buxton Festival, including a part in The Good-Natur’d Man.

He had the title role in the film The Young Mr. Pitt (1942) for 20th Century Fox and played Captain Shotover in a new staging of Heartbreak House at the Cambridge Theatre in London from 1942 to 1943. For MGM British he starred in the film The Adventures of Tartu (1943), with Valerie Hobson. Donat wanted to play the Chorus in Olivier's Henry V, but his contract with MGM prevented this and the role went to Leslie Banks.

In 1943, he took over the lease of the Westminster Theatre, staging a number of plays there until 1945, including An Ideal Husband (1943–44), The Glass Slipper (1944) and The Cure for Love (1945) by Walter Greenwood. With the latter, which he directed, he began his professional association with Renée Asherson, later his second wife.

Donat was reunited with Korda for the film Perfect Strangers (1945), known in the United States as Vacation from Marriage, with Deborah Kerr. It was his last film for MGM British.

During the Second World War MGM Studios "adopted" RCAF 427 "Lion" Squadron. The Studio and Actors sent packages and letters to 427's personnel. Heavy Bombers carried the names of MGM stars to battle in the skies over Europe, among these Robert Donat whose name was borne by a Handley-Page Halifax heavy bomber.

== Later career ==
In 1946, Donat and Asherson appeared at the Aldwych Theatre in a production of Much Ado About Nothing, directed by Donat. He also directed The Man Behind the Statue by Peter Ustinov. Both lost money. In early 1947, immediately following his release from MGM-British, Eagle-Lion Films planned to shoot Gerald Butler's Kiss the Blood Off My Hands with Donat in the lead and purchased the screen rights to the novel. The film was not made and the screen rights were scooped up by Burt Lancaster who starred in a 1948 film version.

Donat had a small but crucial scene as Irish leader Charles Stewart Parnell in Captain Boycott (1947) with Stewart Granger. He appeared on stage in a revival of A Sleeping Clergyman in 1947.

He auditioned as Bill Sikes in David Lean's Oliver Twist (1948), but Lean thought him wrong for the part and cast Robert Newton instead. Donat played the male lead in The Winslow Boy (1948), a popular adaptation of the Terence Rattigan play.

Donat and Asherson reprised their stage roles in the film version of The Cure for Love (1949). His only film as director, its production was affected by his ill health. The film's soundtrack had to be re-recorded after shooting was completed because Donat's asthma had severely affected his voice. Modestly received by a reviewer in The Monthly Film Bulletin, and described as "pedestrian" by Philip French in 2009, it was a hit in the North. In this film, Donat used his natural Mancunian accent, which his early elocution lessons had attempted to suppress completely.

Donat appeared on radio. In October 1949, he did a performance of Justice by John Galsworthy on Theatre Guild on the Air for America. Donat and Asherson also appeared in The Magic Box (1951), in which Donat played William Friese-Greene. However, his asthma continued to affect his ability to perform.

He was cast as Thomas Becket in T. S. Eliot's Murder in the Cathedral in Robert Helpmann's production at The Old Vic theatre in 1952 but, although his return to stage was well received, his illness forced him to withdraw during the run. For the same reason, he dropped out of the film Hobson's Choice (1954). Scheduled to play Willy Mossop, he was replaced by John Mills. Author David Shipman speculates that Donat's asthma may have been psychosomatic: "His tragedy was that the promise of his early years was never fulfilled and that he was haunted by agonies of doubt and disappointment (which probably were the cause of his chronic asthma)." David Thomson also suggested this explanation, and Donat himself thought that his illness had a 90% basis in his psychology. In a 1980 interview with Barry Norman, his first wife, Ella Annesley Voysey (by then known as Ella Hall), said that Donat had an asthma attack as a psychosomatic response to the birth of their daughter. According to her, "Robert was full of fear".

Lease of Life (1954), made by Ealing Studios, was his penultimate film. In it, Donat played a vicar who discovers that he has a terminal illness. Donat's final role was the Mandarin of Yang Cheng in The Inn of the Sixth Happiness (1958). His last words in the film, an emotional soliloquy in which the Mandarin confesses his conversion to Christianity, were prophetic: "We shall not see each other again, I think. Farewell". It reduced Ingrid Bergman, playing the missionary Gladys Aylward, to tears. He had collapsed with a stroke during filming but managed to recover enough to complete the film.

== Personal life ==
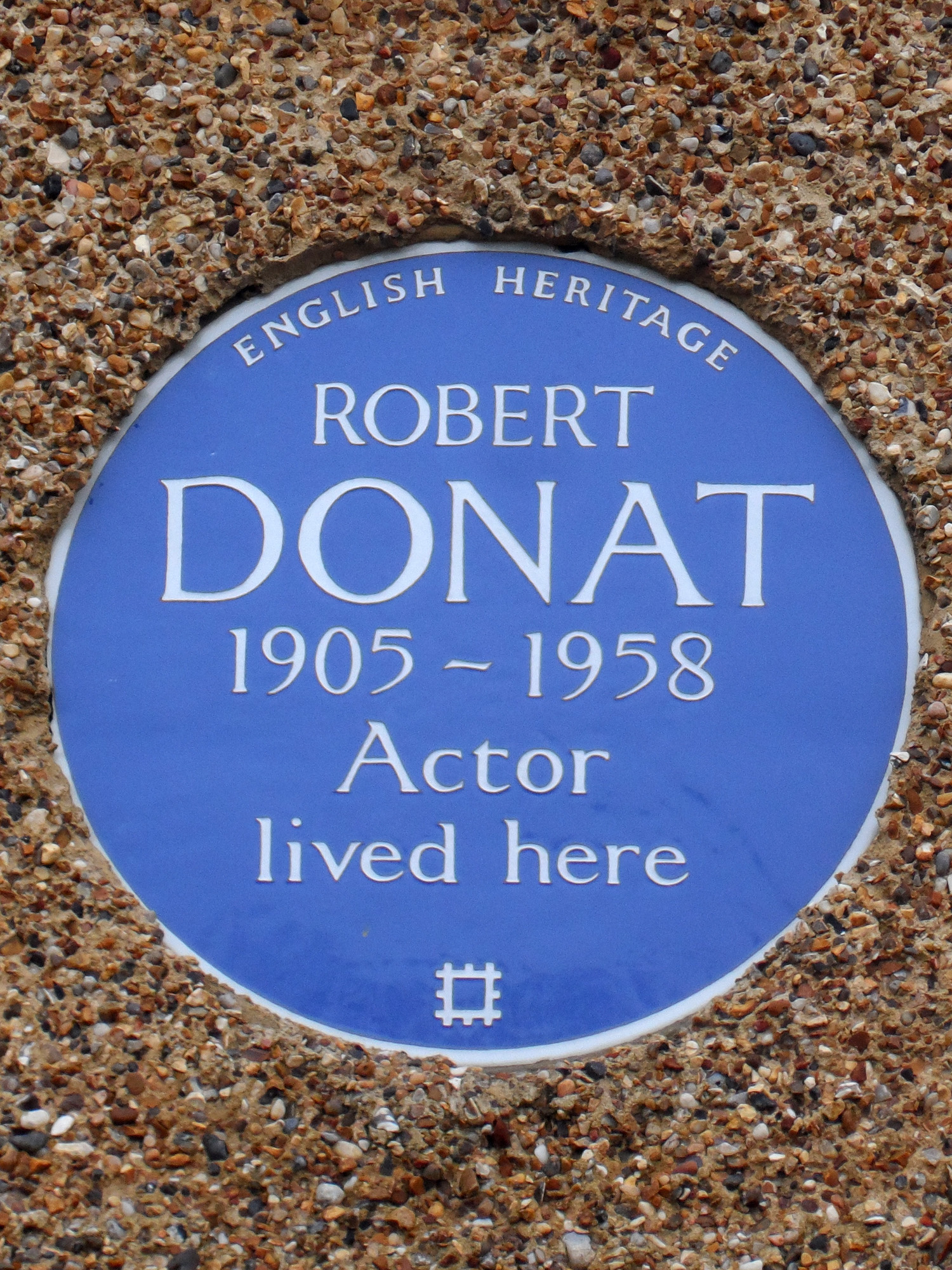
English Heritage blue plaque at 8 Meadway, Hampstead Garden Suburb, London

In 1929, Donat married Ella Annesley Voysey, niece of architect Charles Voysey. They had one daughter, Joanna Donat (born 1931) and two sons, John Donat (born 1933) and Brian Donat (born 1936), but divorced in 1946.

On 4 May 1953, Donat married again, to actress Renée Asherson, born Dorothy Renee Ascherson, daughter of Charles Ascherson and Dorothy Lilian Wiseman. They lived at 8 The Grove, Highgate until their separation three years later, partly owing to the severity of his asthma. They may have been close to a reconciliation when he died. She never remarried.

== Death ==
Donat died at the West End Hospital for Neurology and Neurosurgery in Soho, London, on 9 June 1958, aged 53. His biographer Kenneth Barrow said he had "... a brain tumour the size of a duck egg and cerebral thrombosis was certified as the primary cause of death". His body was cremated privately in Marylebone three days after his death. He left an estate worth £25,236 (equivalent to £680,000 in 2024).

== Legacy ==
Donat has a star on the Hollywood Walk of Fame at 6420 Hollywood Blvd. A blue plaque also commemorates his life at 8 Meadway in Hampstead Garden Suburb. His place of birth, at 42 Everett Road in Withington, is commemorated by a similar plaque.

== Filmography ==
Year	Title	Role(s)	Director
1932	Men of Tomorrow	Julian Angell	Leontine Sagan
1932	That Night in London	Dick Warren	Rowland V. Lee
1933	Cash	Paul Martin	Zoltan Korda
1933	The Private Life of Henry VIII	Thomas Culpeper	Alexander Korda
1934	The Count of Monte Cristo	Edmond Dantès	Rowland V. Lee
1935	The 39 Steps	Richard Hannay	Alfred Hitchcock
1935	The Ghost Goes West	Murdoch Glourie / Donald Glourie	René Clair
1937	Knight Without Armour	A.J. Fothergill / Peter Ouranoff	Jacques Feyder
1938	The Citadel	Dr. Andrew Manson	King Vidor
1939	Goodbye, Mr. Chips	Mr. Chips	Sam Wood
1942	The Young Mr. Pitt	Pitt the Younger / Earl of Chatham	Carol Reed
1943	The Adventures of Tartu	Capt. Terence Stevenson / Capt. Jan Tartu	Harold S. Bucquet
1945	Perfect Strangers	Robert Wilson	Alexander Korda
1947	Captain Boycott	Charles Stewart Parnell	Frank Launder
1948	The Winslow Boy	Sir Robert Morton	Anthony Asquith
1949	The Cure for Love	Sgt. Jack Hardacre	Himself
1951	The Magic Box	William Friese-Greene	John Boulting
1954	Lease of Life	Rev. William Thorne	Charles Frend
1958	The Inn of the Sixth Happiness	The Mandarin of Yangcheng	Mark Robson
