= Kurt Schröder =

German composer and conductor

- Born: 6 September 1888; Hagenow, Grand Duchy of Mecklenburg-Schwerin, German Empire
- Died: 5 January 1962 (aged 73); Frankfurt am Main; West Germany
- Occupation: Composer
- Years active: 1930–1949

Georges Bizet: L'Arlésienne, suite no. 1, first movement, excerpt from a 1948 recording with the Frankfurt Radio Symphony.

Kurt Schröder (1888–1962) was a German composer and conductor. Schröder composed a number of film scores. During the 1930s he worked in Britain for Alexander Korda's London Film Productions, and scored the company's breakthrough hit The Private Life of Henry VIII in 1933.

== Selected filmography ==
- Who Takes Love Seriously? (1931)
- Der Mörder Dimitri Karamasoff (1931)
- The Trunks of Mr. O.F. (1931)
- Where Is This Lady? (1932)
- Wedding Rehearsal (1932)
- Men of Tomorrow (1932)
- The Song You Gave Me (1933)
- Mirages de Paris (1933)
- Cash (1933)
- Red Wagon (1933)
- The Girl from Maxim's (1933)
- The Private Life of Henry VIII. (1933)
- On Secret Service (1933)
- Black Roses (1935)
- Escapade (1936)
- Uncle Bräsig (1936)
- Seven Slaps (1937)
- Fanny Elssler (1937)
- Triad (1938)
- The Scapegoat (1940)
- The Girl at the Reception (1940)
- Twilight (1940)
- Der laufende Berg (1941)
- Der Posaunist (1949)

== Bibliography ==
- Hake, Sabine. Popular Cinema of the Third Reich. University of Texas Press, 2001.
