= Wedding Rehearsal =

1932 British romantic comedy film

- French theatrical release poster
- Directed by: Alexander Korda
- Written by: Lajos Bíró (story); George Grossmith, Jr. (story); Helen Gardom; Robert Vansittart; Arthur Wimperis (dialogue)
- Produced by: Alexander Korda (uncredited)
- Starring: Roland Young; George Grossmith, Jr.
- Cinematography: Leslie Rowson
- Edited by: Harold Young
- Music by: Kurt Schröder
- Production company: London Films
- Distributed by: Ideal Films
- Release date: 1 October 1932 (London)
- Running time: 84 minutes
- Country: United Kingdom
- Language: English

Wedding Rehearsal is a 1932 British romantic comedy film directed by Alexander Korda and starring Roland Young and George Grossmith, Jr.. It was written by Lajos Bíró, George Grossmith, Jr., Helen Gardom, Robert Vansittart and Arthur Wimperis. A grandmother forces her bachelor grandson to seek a wife.

== Plot ==
"Reggie", the carefree Marquis of Buckminster, is happy to serve as best man at his friends' weddings, but loathes the idea of getting married himself. However, his grandmother, the Dowager Marchioness of Buckminster, is impatient for him to have children and gives him an ultimatum: find a wife or she will cut off his allowance. She gives him a list of half a dozen or so candidates she has handpicked. At the head of the list are the twin daughters of the Earl of Stokeshire, Lady Mary Rose and Lady Rose Mary. Observing his discomfort with interest is the Marchioness's secretary and companion, Miss Hutchinson).

Reggie had been seeing a beautiful married woman, Mrs. Dryden, but faced with poverty, he gives in. He flips a coin to decide between the twins, but finds (to his relief) that both already have beaus, "Bimbo" and "Tootles". However, the young ladies have been reluctant to approach their status-conscious father, as their sweethearts are commoners. Reggie comes up with the idea to save himself from marriage by getting all his grandmother's candidates engaged, starting with the twins. He helps the two couples by leaking the story of their engagements to the press, forcing the earl to (reluctantly) accept the situation. The guests spend the days leading up to the dual wedding at the earl's country estate, affording Reggie the opportunity to successfully play matchmaker for the rest of the women on his list.

One night, he finds Miss Hutchinson alone and crying; he guesses she is having romantic problems of her own and advises her to look her man straight in the eye and have it out. Later, she takes his advice, and confronts him. Reggie then discovers he is not so opposed to marriage after all. All is complete when the marchioness herself accepts the proposal of a longtime admirer, Major Harry Roxbury.

== Cast ==
- Roland Young as Marquis of Buckminster
- George Grossmith, Jr. as Earl of Stokeshire
- John Loder as "Bimbo"
- Wendy Barrie as Lady Mary Rose
- Joan Gardner as Lady Rose Mary
- Merle Oberon as Miss Hutchinson
- Helen Maud Holt as Countess of Stokeshire
- Kate Cutler as Dowager Marchioness of Buckminster
- Maurice Evans as "Tootles"
- Morton Selten as Major Harry Roxbury
- Edmund Breon as Lord Fleet
- Laurence Hanray as News Editor
- Diana Napier as Mrs. Dryden

== Reception ==
Michael Balcon, whose company financed the film, later wrote "The film was gay, frothy, sophisticated and good to look at, but in harsh box-office terms it was relatively unsuccessful." This led to Balcon not backing Korda's next film, The Private Life of Henry VIII.

Film Weekly wrote: "Satirical comedy poking fun at the English Society wedding. It doesn't quite come off, but George Grossmith is funny, Roland Young is witty, the girls are pretty, and the backgrounds are 'dressy.' Novel light entertainment."

Kine Weekly wrote: "Elegantly staged satirical society comedy with a light, airy story, which is made entertaining by clever characterisation and bright, resourceful direction. There is a slight tendency to run to length, but the by-play is amusing and is significant, and is enlivened by witty dialogue. ... The producer, Alexander Korda, has not quite succeeded in capturing the brilliance and smoothness of his Service for Ladies, there are times when the continuity is disjointed and the interest flags, but he has built up good character, takes full advantage of the experience and cleverness of his cast, and is a master of technique."

Picturegoer wrote: "This picture represents a polished piece of society satire and an example of good pictorial technique. The main faults are that the satire does not always hit the mark and some situations are rather too drawn out. Characterisation is good, with Roland Young at ease as an eligible bachelor, the Marquis of Buckminster, whose grandmother is trying to force him into marriage. The grandmother is played by Kate Cutler, and an excellent performance she gives."
