= The Rise of Catherine the Great =

- Directed by: Paul Czinner
- Written by: Lajos Bíró; Arthur Wimperis; Melchior Lengyel; Marjorie Deans
- Based on: The Czarina by Lajos Bíró and Melchior Lengyel
- Produced by: Alexander Korda; Ludovico Toeplitz (uncredited)
- Starring: Elisabeth Bergner; Douglas Fairbanks Jr. Flora Robson
- Narrated by: Alexander Kerensky
- Cinematography: Georges Périnal
- Edited by: Stephen Harrison; Harold Young
- Music by: Ernst Toch (uncredited); Irving Berlin
- Production company: London Films
- Distributed by: United Artists
- Release date: 9 February 1934
- Running time: 94 minutes
- Country: United Kingdom
- Language: English
- Budget: $550,000

The Rise of Catherine the Great (also titled Catherine the Great) is a 1934 British historical film about the rise to power of Catherine the Great, Empress of Russia. Produced by Alexander Korda and directed by Paul Czinner, the screenplay was based on Lajos Bíró and Melchior Lengyel's 1912 play The Czarina and was co-written by Arthur Wimperis and Marjorie Deans (credited as scenarist). It stars Elisabeth Bergner as Catherine, Douglas Fairbanks Jr. as Grand Duke Peter, and Flora Robson as Empress Elizabeth.

The movie was banned in Germany. On 14 March 1934 this matter invoked a question in the British Parliament (House of Commons): "Is it to be understood that no British film in which there is a Jewish actor or actress will be permitted to be shown in Germany in future?".

== Plot ==
This historical drama recounts the events that led to the accession of Catherine the Great, Empress of all the Russias. The film opens with the arrival in 1744 of Princess Sophie Auguste Frederika – whose name would be changed to ‘Catherine’ – from her father's court of Anhalt-Zerbst (in modern Germany) to the court of the Empress Elizabeth. "Little Catherine" is to marry the Grand Duke Peter, nephew and heir presumptive of the unmarried and childless Empress Elizabeth.

Peter already displays signs of mental instability and a sharply misogynist streak. He rejects Catherine on their wedding night, reacting to something innocently said by his French valet, claiming that she used feminine tricks to win him over. In time, though, Peter accepts her and they have a happy marriage for a while. Meanwhile, Catherine gains important experience of government from working as principal aide to the empress.

The empress dies and Peter becomes tsar, but his mental illness is starting to get the better of him, along with sheer boredom in the job. Catherine still loves him despite beginning a very public love affair with one of her best friends – until one night when Peter goes one step too far in publicly humiliating his wife. She ceases to love him, which enables her to be clear-headed in supporting a planned coup d'état. The following morning, he is arrested and Catherine is made Empress of All the Russias.

The elevation is marred by Peter's murder that very morning, contrary to Catherine's command. Grigory Orlov explains that everything has a price, and the crown has the highest price of all. The film ends, with Catherine in tears on her throne, while the cheers of the crowds are heard outside.

== Cast ==
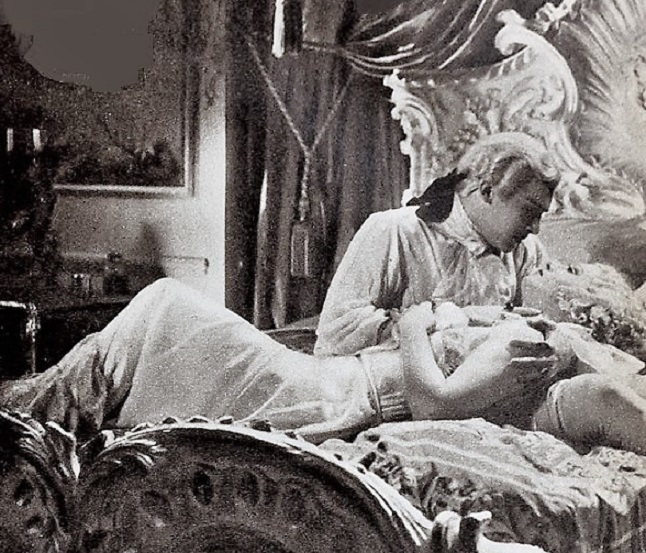
Fairbanks and Bergner in a scene from the film

- Douglas Fairbanks Jr. as Grand Duke Peter
- Elisabeth Bergner as Catherine
- Flora Robson as Empress Elisabeth
- Gerald du Maurier as Lecocq
- Irene Vanbrugh as Princess Anhalt-Zerbst
- Joan Gardner as Katushienka
- Dorothy Hale as Countess Olga
- Diana Napier as Countess Vorontzova
- Griffith Jones as Grigory Orlov
- Gibb McLaughlin as Bestujhev
- Clifford Heatherley as Ogarev
- Laurence Hanray as Goudovitch
- Allan Jeayes as Col. Karnilov

== Production ==
=== Development ===
After the success of his film The Private Life of Henry VIII (1932), producer Alexander Korda made a deal with United Artists and decided to make another film about the personal life of a historical figure. His next production would be a film adaptation of the 1912 Hungarian play titled The Czarina (A carno), written by Lajos Bíró and Melchior Lengyel, the screenwriters of The Private Life of Henry VIII. The play was first adapted for the screen as the 1924 silent film Forbidden Paradise, directed by Ernst Lubitsch and starring Pola Negri. Bíró, Arthur Wimperis, and Marjorie Deans worked on the new adaptation and turned Catherine the Great into a woman who "manufactured" her love affairs in order to make her husband jealous.

In 1933, German actress Elisabeth Bergner and her husband, Hungarian director Paul Czinner, went to England and signed a contract with Korda's London Films. Bergner was cast as Catherine and she selected her husband as her director. Charles Laughton recommended Flora Robson for the role of Empress Elizabeth of Russia. Korda's first choice for the part of the Grand Duke (later Peter III of Russia) was Joseph Schildkraut, but he gave the role to Douglas Fairbanks Jr., his second choice, after several interviews and screen tests. Fairbanks later wrote, "At that time Alex had no further need to do anyone any favors, particularly his new United Artists partners. He was in the catbird seat. So casting me was not even done as a favor to my father. In fact, Pete was as surprised, though surely not so pleased, as I. […] Now I would have a chance to show Hollywood's producers what I could do with a real character-lead."

=== Filming ===
Korda was not satisfied with the way Czinner was directing the other actors, so he intervened and directed several senes himself. In a documentary about Korda, Elisabeth Bergner said, "Well, he wasn't a very good director and suddenly after Henry he thought he was, and he could butt in and say it should be done this way or another way and forgot our contract which didn't allow him this. So we had fights. . . ." Douglas Fairbanks Jr. thought "Czinner directed too gently and sympathetically. It seemed he was somewhat frightened by his star-wife and the overall caliber of the cast. Therefore it sometimes became necessary for Alex to leave his producer's office, come down to the set, and take over as director. As such, he was first-rate." Korda directed Flora Robson's scenes. Robson recalled, "But he was good at bolstering people with a sex inferiority complex. I had elderly lovers in Catherine the Great and felt a sight in a pale blue wig. He used to kneel at my feet before a 'take' and say: 'My Great Garbo!' in his delicious foreign accent, which made me laugh and feel better." Diana Napier, who played one of Peter's mistresses, said that Korda was her director: "To be quite honest, and I've got a very good memory, I just don't remember Paul Czinner on the set, not in my scenes anyway."

Fairbanks Jr. described Bergner as "charming to work with, full of special mannerisms and meticulously honed tricks of the trade. She timed her scenes to the second. […] She was technically almost unsurpassed." He also said that Robson, in "her first major film role, made it perfectly clear to all that she would become one of the finest actresses of the day", and lauded Du Maurier's portrayal of "the Czar's witty French valet" as "a glistening mountain peak out of a foothill of a role".

== Release ==
The Rise of Catherine the Great had its world premiere on 19 January 1934 at the Miracles Theater in Paris, France. The audience included Alexander Korda, Elisabeth Bergner, Paul Czinner, and Douglas Fairbanks Sr. and Jr.

The film premiered in the United States on 14 February 1934 at New York City's Astor Theatre.

== Reception ==
Mordaunt Hall of The New York Times reviewed the film twice, first on 15 February (the day after its American premiere) and then on 25 February. In his first review, he described The Rise of Catherine the Great as a "handsome film" and "the most expensively staged picture that has come from London, and in telling its story it clings considerably closer to history than do most kindred pictorial subjects." In the second one, he wrote, "But the film is not alone remarkable for its impeccable settings and its lovely sartorial creations, for it is quite a well-written pictorial drama." Hall praised Elisabeth Bergner's "clever portrayal" and said that she "goes through most of her scenes with rare dignity and she accomplishes marvels with her large eyes and expressive lips." He later added, "Miss Bergner's acting is such that it becomes gradually more and more effective. If she speaks a line there is written in her eyes and on her mouth the feeling of the mood."

Delight Evans of Screenland commended Fairbanks Jr.'s debut in British cinema: "His first role, that of a wild and weird Russian Grand Duke, is at once more colorful and more exacting than he has ever been given in Hollywood. And he plays it in the proper grand manner. Here's the Boy Barrymore." Evans also believed that Bergner "dominates the picture by sheer artistry. She makes the young Catherine a hauntingly charming figure, pitiful even in her victories, always human, but always royal. Bergner, I suspect, is one of our truly Great Actresses."

Motion Picture Magazine was enthusiastic in its review, although it noticed that the film "substitutes a heart-breaking romance for the intrigues that history relates." The magazine recommended the film: "Every Hollywood director and player should see this picture, as well as anyone else who appreciates fine acting, splendid settings and sensitive direction." Half of its review was dedicated to Bergner: "Elizabeth Bergner, German actress, makes the piteous, lonely figure of the girl Catherine—destined to rule the greatest of empires—breath-takingly beautiful. Small, almost plain, she has a hundred expressions, a hundred cadences in her voice, a hundred moods. She vibrates to emotion like a sensitive instrument. Without the aid of make-up, she grows older, more mature before our eyes when she has to choose between her adoration for her unfaithful husband and her duty to her 'children,' the Russian people."

Variety's original 1933 review summed up the film as having numerous sequences with outstanding "direction, portrayal and dialog," particularly crediting performances by Fairbanks (whose performance they described as one of the best of his career) and Robson, while noting that Bergner was "altogether believable" as the young Catherine.

Reviewing a DVD box set of Korda's historical films, New York Times critic Dave Kehr called the film "a handsome but conventional melodrama" and preferred the contemporaneous rival Catherine biopic, Josef von Sternberg's The Scarlet Empress (1934).

The Guardian's historical films reviewer Alex von Tunzelmann credits the film with both entertainment value (grade: B−) and substantial historical depth and accuracy (grade: B−).

== Bibliography ==
- Fairbanks, Douglas, Jr. (1988). The Salad Days. Doubleday.
- Kulik, Karol (1975). Alexander Korda: The Man Who Could Work Miracles. Arlington House. ISBN 0-87000-335-6.
- Tabori, Paul (1966). Alexander Korda. Living Books. LCCN 66-21595.
