= Joan Gardner (British actress) =

British actress (1914–1999)

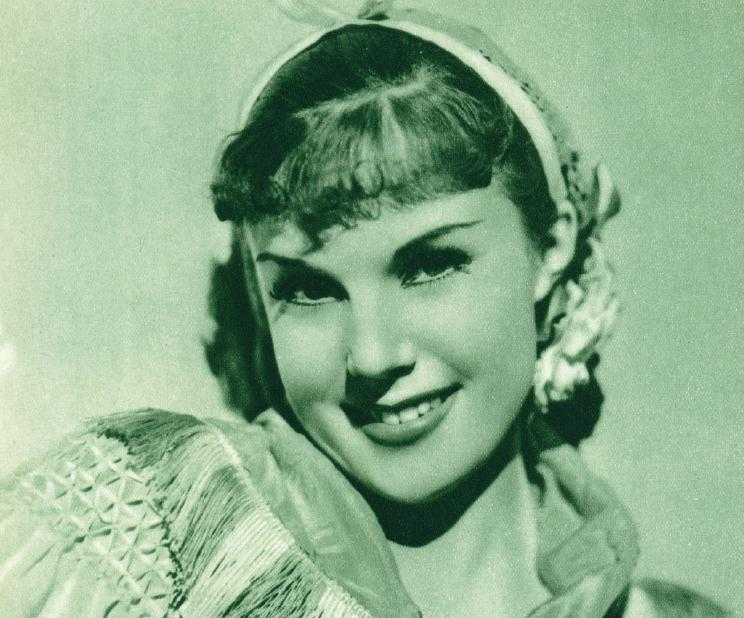
- Joan Gardner 1934
- Born: Joan Gardener; 26 October 1914; Chesham, Buckinghamshire, England, UK
- Died: 17 September 1999 (aged 84); Beverly Hills, Los Angeles, California, United States
- Years active: 1932–1938
- Spouse: Zoltan Korda (m. 1930; died 1961)
- Children: 2

Joan Gardner (born Joan Gardener, 26 October 1914 – 17 September 1999) was a British actress.

Gardner was born in Chesham, Buckinghamshire. She made her stage debut immediately on leaving school and by age 18 had achieved success there. She was seen by Alexander Korda (her future brother-in-law) who signed her to a five-year film contract at London Film Productions, with Wedding Rehearsal being her film debut as one of the Roxbury twins.

Gardner was married to Zoltán Korda and together they had two sons, David and Nicholas. She died in Beverly Hills, California, in 1999 at the age of 84.

== Filmography ==
- Wedding Rehearsal (1932)
- Men of Tomorrow (1932)
- The Man Outside (1933)
- Love at Second Sight (1934)
- The Rise of Catherine the Great (1934)
- The Private Life of Don Juan (1934)
- The Scarlet Pimpernel (1934)
- Barnacle Bill (1935)
- The Man Who Could Work Miracles (1936)
- Forget Me Not (1936)
- Wings Over Africa (1937)
- Dark Journey (1937)
- The Rebel Son (1938)
- The Challenge (1938)
