= The Cure for Love =

1949 British film by Robert Donat

- Directed by: Robert Donat
- Written by: Walter Greenwood (play); Albert Fennell; Alexander Shaw; Robert Donat
- Produced by: Robert Donat
- Starring: Robert Donat; Renee Asherson; Dora Bryan
- Cinematography: Jack E. Cox
- Edited by: Bert Bates
- Music by: William Alwyn
- Production company: London Films
- Distributed by: British Lion Films
- Release dates: 29 December 1949 (London premiere); 6 February 1950 (UK general release)
- Running time: 98 minutes
- Country: United Kingdom
- Language: English
- Box office: £193,781 (UK)

The Cure for Love is a 1949 British comedy film directed and produced by Robert Donat and starring Donat, Renée Asherson and Dora Bryan. It was written by Albert Fennell, Alexander Shae and Donat, based on the 1945 hit play of the same name by Walter Greenwood about a mild-mannered soldier returning home after the Second World War.

== Plot ==
During World War 2, Sergeant Jack Hardacre returns to his Lancashire home on leave from service in the Middle East. Although he believes he is engaged to Jenny Jenkins, he falls in love with his mother's billeted lodger, Milly Southern, a factory girl from London. Jack comes to realise he never actually proposed marriage to Jenny who manipulated him into believing they were engaged, so he breaks up with her and marries Milly. Meanwhile, local publican Henry Lancaster romances Jack's plain-speaking mother.

== Cast ==
- Robert Donat as Sergeant Jack Hardacre
- Renée Asherson as Milly Southern
- Marjorie Rhodes as Mrs. Sarah Hardacre
- Charles Victor as Henry Lancaster
- Thora Hird as Mrs. Dorbell
- Dora Bryan as Jenny Jenkins
- Gladys Henson as Mrs. Jenkins
- John Stratton as Sam
- Francis Wignall as Claude
- Norman Partridge as vicar
- Edna Morris as Mrs. Harrison
- Michael Dear as Albert
- Tonie MacMillan as Mrs. Donald
- Lilian Stanley as Mrs. Small
- Margot Bryant as Mrs. Hooley
- Lucille Gray as tough girl
- Jack Howarth as Hunter
- Sam Kydd as Charlie Fox
- Jack Rodney as Eddie
- Reginald Green as Douglas
- Johnny Catcher as Canadian soldier
- Jan Conrad as Polish soldier
- Raymond Rollett as the singer

== Production ==
Donat had appeared in the stage play in 1945. In 1948 it was announced he would make a film version for Alexander Korda. It was his sole feature credit as director, although he had directed on stage.

Francis Wignall was chosen out of 3,000 boys to play a lead role. Donat battled ill health during pre-production. The film was shot at Shepperton Studios, with sets designed by the art director Wilfred Shingleton.

== Reception ==
=== Box office ===
Trade papers called the film a "notable box office attraction" in British cinemas in 1950.

=== Critical ===
Kine Weekly wrote: "Wartime romantic comedy, spoken with a broad Lancashire brogue. Based on Walter Greenwood's play about a sergeant who is all but ensnared by a trollop, it contains a few obvious laughs, but is seldom witty and never illuminating. Robert Donat is producer, director, star and part author, but the prodigious one man band fails to conceal the film's stage heritage ... The picture, rather like an old-time music hall sketch in its characterisation and make-up, suffers from indifferent, or rather inexperienced, direction. Robert Donat has about as much as he can manage as leading player and his preoccupation cramps the film's growth. Stunted development emphasises the staginess of its types and the transparency of its humour. Without going highbrow, it should have made much more of its rich and storied locale. Even slapstick needs firm and colourful background."

The Monthly Film Bulletin wrote: "Antediluvian regional farce."

Variety wrote: "Walter Greenwood's romantic romp in Lancashire comes to the screen as an all-Robert Donat production. He is star, director, producer and also collaborator on the script. While The Cure for Love will undoubtedy prove to be a big money winner at home, it seems a pity that the talent invested in it should have been wasted on a production that won't do for the transatlantic market, mainly because of the particularly pronounced Lancashire dialect which American audiences won't get. ... In the early stages, the story is told crisply with some good robust humor. This pace, however, isn't sustained, mainly owing to loose direction and indecisive editing. In consequence tlhe second half tends to drag, thus defeating much of the comedy situations. Donat makes a brave attempt, and being of Lancashire origin, has little difficulty with the dialect. His is a sound and vigorous study of the sergeant, which is best matched by an honest portrayal from Marjorie Rhodes as his seemingly hard, but understanding mother. Renee Asherson displays full measure of charm as the girl to whom he is finally hitched and Dora Bryan plays the little schemer in a hard, monotonous key."

Picturegoer wrote: "The story is unfolded with disarming simplicity, and is always understated, never overdone. It has homeliness, charm and human feeling."
