= The Man Who Could Work Miracles =

1937 film by Lothar Mendes

- Directed by: Lothar Mendes
- Written by: H. G. Wells; Lajos Bíró
- Based on: The Man Who Could Work Miracles; 1898 story in Hampton's Magazine by H. G. Wells
- Produced by: Alexander Korda
- Starring: Roland Young; Joan Gardner; Ralph Richardson
- Cinematography: Harold Rosson
- Edited by: Philip Charlot; William W. Hornbeck
- Music by: Mischa Spoliansky
- Production company: London Film Productions
- Distributed by: United Artists
- Release dates: 8 February 1937 (UK); 19 February 1937 (US)
- Running time: 82 minutes
- Country: United Kingdom
- Language: English

The Man Who Could Work Miracles is a 1937 British fantasy comedy film directed by Lothar Mendes and produced by Alexander Korda. The film stars Roland Young with a cast of supporting players including Sir Ralph Richardson. Possibly the best-known of Mendes' 20 films, it is an expanded version of H. G. Wells's 1898 short story of the same name. Wells worked on the adaptation, revising the plot to reflect his socialist frustrations with the British upper class and the growing threats of communism and fascism in Europe.

== Plot ==
The film begins in the celestial realms, with three superhuman entities – gods, or perhaps angels – regarding the planet Earth. Despairing of these "animals" that one of them continues to care about, the other two dare him to conduct an experiment to see if such lesser creatures can handle the kind of power over reality that might let them deserve to reach the stars. As the experiment's only limit, the Celestials will allow no control over a person's free will, as decreed by their master (possibly God). Choosing a human subject at random, the one who controls Power reaches down and bestows it upon George Fotheringay, an English middle-class haberdasher's assistant.

In a pub, Fotheringay argues with his friends about miracles and their impossibility. He calls upon his "will" to force a change and inadvertently causes a miracle; he makes an oil lamp turn upside down without anyone touching it and with the flame burning steadily downward. At home, he performs the same trick with a candle and moves on to feats such as lifting his table, lifting his bed, enlarging a candle extinguisher to a brightly painted cone and making a kitten appear under it and turning his bed into a cornucopia of fruits and bunnies.

Fotheringay performs his miracles at the clothing store where he works, such as making someone's freckles vanish. When he curses a policeman to hell, the man finds himself surrounded by flames and smoke. Fotheringay, horrified at his unintended action, has the cop relocated to San Francisco.

Because Fotheringay cannot decide how to use his newfound powers, he contacts local vicar Mr. Maydig, who concocts a plan to have Fotheringay abolish famine, plague, war, poverty and the ruling class. Fotheringay plays a miraculous trick on Colonel Winstanley, but when Winstanley hears about Fotheringay, he is baffled and threatened by the vicar's plans. Winstanley and his mates try to shoot Fotheringay, but Fotheringay makes himself magically invulnerable.

Realizing that others, including the vicar, wish to exploit him for their own ends, Fotheringay decides not to carry out the vicar's plan. Instead, he creates an old-fashioned kingdom in which he is the centre of the universe. In a fit of reckless pomposity, he changes the Colonel's house into a spectacular palace of gold and marble. He summons many people to his palace, where he dresses like a king and appoints the girl whom he loves as queen. He commands the leaders of the world to create a utopia, free of greed, war, plague, famine, jealousy and toil. Maydig begs Fotheringay to wait until the following day, so Fotheringay buys some time by stopping the Earth's rotation. However, this causes all living creatures and objects to whirl off the Earth's surface. Civilization and all life other than Fotheringay are obliterated as everything in the world flies through the air and is dashed to pieces.

The desperate and contrite Fotheringay calls on his powers one last time to return the world to its state before he had entered the pub the day before, willing away his power to work miracles. He appears again in the pub, but when he tries the lamp trick, he fails.

One of the Celestials remarks that all that came of the experiment was "negativism, lust and vindictive indignation," which is all that humans have. The giver of power defends that humans were only apes yesterday and need time to grow up, and that there is a spark of indignation against wrongness in the human heart. The giver of power decides to give humanity power slowly and gradually, allowing wisdom and maturity to keep pace. The others think that the result will be the same but are dared to return years later to see for themselves.

== Cast ==
- Roland Young as George Worthington Fotheringay
- Ralph Richardson as Colonel Winstanley
- Edward Chapman as Major Grigsby
- Ernest Thesiger as Mr. Maydig
- Joan Gardner as Ada Price
- Sophie Stewart as Maggie Hooper
- Robert Cochran as Bill Stoker
- Lady Tree as Mr. Grigsby's Housekeeper
- Laurence Hanray as Mr. Bamfylde, London & Essex Bank
- George Zucco as Moody, Colonel Winstanley's Butler
- Wallace Lupino as Police Constable Winch (billed as Wally Lupino)
- Joan Hickson as Effie Brickman
- Wally Patch as Police Superintendent Smithelle
- Mark Daly as Toddy Beamish
- Ivan Brandt as Player (a god)
- George Sanders as Indifference (a god)
- Torin Thatcher as Observer (a god)

== Reception ==
In The Spectator in 1936, Graham Greene summarized the film as "a muddle" and commented that "the whole entertainment, sometimes fake poetry, sometimes unsuccessful comedy, sometimes farce, sometimes sociological discussion, [is] without a spark of creative talent or a trace of film ability." Greene criticized the direction and production as "shocking [with] slowness, vulgarity, [and] over-emphasis," the casting and characterization as "quite the wrong type," the special effects as "grimly repetitive, [...] dull and unconvincing and [apt to] destroy illusion" and Wells' original story as "pretentious."

Writing in The New York Times, Frank Nugent noted "a delightfully humorous fantasy with an undertone of sober Wellsian philosophy," praising Roland Young's performance as having "described the character perfectly, drawing him as a fumbling little man with a rabbity soul, a limited imagination and other characteristic human frailties and virtues" and concluding that "Lothar Mendes's direction has achieved a sound balance between the jocund and the profound. Mr. Wells, in brief, is doing well in his new medium."

== Legacy ==
The Man Who Could Work Miracles is discussed in the 2026 documentary film Musk.

== See also ==
- Things to Come
- Absolutely Anything
