= Cash (1933 film) =

1933 British film by Zoltan Korda

- DVD cover
- Directed by: Zoltan Korda
- Written by: Anthony Gibbs; Dorothy Greenhill; Arthur Wimperis
- Produced by: Randall Faye; Alexander Korda
- Starring: Robert Donat; Wendy Barrie; Edmund Gwenn; Clifford Heatherley
- Cinematography: Robert Martin
- Edited by: Stephen Harrison
- Music by: Kurt Schröder
- Production company: London Film Productions
- Distributed by: Paramount British Pictures
- Release date: 9 October 1933
- Running time: 73 minutes
- Country: United Kingdom
- Language: English

Cash is a 1933 British comedy film directed by Zoltan Korda and starring Robert Donat, Wendy Barrie, Edmund Gwenn and Clifford Heatherley. It was made by Alexander Korda's London Film Productions. It was shot at Elstree Studios in Hertfordshire. It was later released in the United States under the alternative title If I Were Rich.

== Plot ==
A businessman on the brink of bankruptcy struggles to keep his company afloat.

== Cast ==
- Robert Donat as Paul Martin
- Wendy Barrie as Lilian Gilbert
- Edmund Gwenn as Edmund Gilbert
- Clifford Heatherley as Hunt
- Morris Harvey as Meyer
- Lawrence Grossmith as Joseph
- Hugh E. Wright as Jordan
- Anthony Holles as Inspector

== Bibliography ==
- Kulik, Karol. Alexander Korda: The Man Who Could Work Miracles. Virgin Books, 1990.
