= The Cure for Love (play) =

1945 comedy play by Walter Greenwood

First West End procdution

The Cure for Love is a comedy play by the British writer Walter Greenwood which premiered in 1945. Its West End run lasted for 219 performances at the Westminster Theatre between July 1945 and January 1946. Amongst the cast were Robert Donat, Renée Asherson (later replaced by Rene Ray), Charles Victor, Marjorie Rhodes and Joan White. The play portrays the return of an easy-going soldier to his Lancashire hometown after the Second World War. He falls in love with a young woman boarding at his mother's house, but struggles to break away from his faithless and calculating fiancée who intends to hold him to their engagement.

== Film adaptation ==
In 1949 the play served as the basis for a film adaptation by London Films. Many of the original stage cast reprised their roles, with Donat both starring and directing in the production. The film was a success at the box office on its general release in 1950.

== Bibliography ==
- Wearing, J.P. The London Stage 1940-1949: A Calendar of Productions, Performers, and Personnel. Rowman & Littlefield, 2014.
