= Renée Asherson =

British actress (1915–2014)

- Born: Dorothy Renée Ascherson; 19 May 1915; Kensington, London, England
- Died: 30 October 2014 (aged 99); Primrose Hill, London, England
- Occupation: Actress
- Years active: 1939–2001
- Spouse: Robert Donat (m. 1953; died 1958)

Dorothy Renée Ascherson (19 May 1915 – 30 October 2014), known professionally as Renée Asherson, was a British actress. Much of her theatrical career was spent in Shakespearean plays, appearing at such venues as the Old Vic, the Liverpool Playhouse, and the Westminster Theatre. Her first stage appearance was on 17 October 1935, aged 20 and her first major film appearance was in The Way Ahead (1944). Her last film appearance was in The Others (2001).

== Early life ==
Asherson was born in Kensington, London, the younger daughter of Dorothy Lilian (née Wiseman) (1881–1975) and shipowner Charles Stephen Ascherson (1877–1945). Her father was of German-Jewish extraction. She was brought up in Gerrards Cross, Buckinghamshire, as well as Switzerland and Anjou. She later trained for the stage at the Webber Douglas Academy of Dramatic Art.

== Career ==
=== Theatre ===
Asherson made her first stage appearance on 17 October 1935, as a walk-on in John Gielgud's production of Romeo and Juliet, though she was also the second understudy for Juliet. It was the production in which Gielgud and Laurence Olivier alternated the roles of Romeo and Mercutio. For eighteen months from 1937 through 1938, Asherson was a member of the Birmingham Repertory Theatre company. She first appeared at The Old Vic in May 1940 as Iris in The Tempest. Asherson toured with the Old Vic company from 1940 through 1941 in the roles of Kate Hardcastle in She Stoops to Conquer, Maria in Twelfth Night, Nerissa in The Merchant of Venice, and Blanche in King John. Asherson appeared at the New Theatre as Blanche in July 1941 before resuming her tour with the Old Vic company.

Asherson appeared at other venues. It was at the Westminster Theatre that she gained especially good notices for her appearance in Walter Greenwood's The Cure for Love in 1945 with Robert Donat. Laurence Olivier wanted her to join his company at The Old Vic, but she chose to continue working with Donat instead. At the Aldwych Theatre, she played Beatrice to Donat's Benedict in Much Ado About Nothing in 1947 and Stella in the first London production of A Streetcar Named Desire in 1949. The latter production was directed by Olivier, with Vivien Leigh as Blanche.

Asherson also performed at the Apollo Theatre in 1956, the Criterion Theatre also in 1956, St Martin's Theatre in 1962, the Savoy Theatre in 1963 and 1977 and the York Theatre Royal in 1973 and 1976.

=== Film ===
An early lead role for Asherson was as King Henry V's love interest, Princess Katherine, in Laurence Olivier's film of Shakespeare's play Henry V (1944).

On film, Donat and Asherson reprised their stage roles in The Cure for Love (1949) in Donat's only film as director. During its production, the couple fell in love. They frequently appeared together in later films, such as The Magic Box (1951). In 1945 she appeared in The Way to the Stars as Iris Winterton, the love interest of Peter Penrose (John Mills).

Her final film role was as the unnamed old woman in the haunted house thriller The Others (2001), starring Nicole Kidman.

=== Television ===
In 1976, she played the tragic Miss Gailey in seven episodes of ATV's epic dramatisation of Arnold Bennett's Clayhanger opposite Janet Suzman and Denis Quilley. In 1978, she portrayed Mother Ancilla in the Armchair Thriller adaptation of the Antonia Fraser novel Quiet as a Nun, and appeared as Mrs Wainwright in the TV miniseries A Man Called Intrepid. In 1981, Asherson played the role of Sylvia Ashburton in the first season and for eight episodes of Tenko. She played Dora Bunner in the 1985 Miss Marple episode, A Murder Is Announced. In 1989, she played Mrs Bartholomew Tom's Midnight Garden. In 1992 she played Charmian Colston in Muriel Spark's Memento Mori. Asherton played murder victim Emily Simpson in the first episode of Midsomer Murders in 1997.

== Personal life ==
Asherson's nephew is the journalist Neal Ascherson.

In 1953 Asherson moved to 8 The Grove, Highgate upon her marriage to fellow actor Robert Donat, separating before his death five years later.

Asherson died in Primrose Hill, London on 30 October 2014, aged 99.

== Filmography ==
Year	Title	Role	Notes
1944	The Way Ahead	Marjorie Gillingham	
1944	Henry V	Princess Katherine	
1945	The Way to the Stars	Iris Winterton	
1945	Caesar and Cleopatra	Iras	Uncredited
1949	Once a Jolly Swagman	Pat	
1949	The Small Back Room	A.T.S. Corporal	
1949	The Cure for Love	Milly Southern	
1951	Pool of London	Sally	
1951	The Magic Box	Miss Tagg	
1953	Malta Story	Joan Rivers	
1954	Time Is My Enemy	Barbara Everton	
1954	The Red Dress	Megan	(segment "Red Dress' story)
1961	The Day the Earth Caught Fire	Angela	
1966	Rasputin, the Mad Monk	Tsarina	
1969	The Smashing Bird I Used to Know	Anne Johnson	
1973	Theatre of Blood	Mrs Maxwell	
1984	Edwin	Lady Margaret Truscott	
1985	A Murder is Announced	Miss Dora Bunner 'Bunny'	
1992	Memento Mori	Charmian Colston	BBC play
1997	Midsomer Murders	Emily Simpson	Pilot: "The Killings at Badger's Drift"
1999	Grey Owl	Carrie Belaney	
2001	The Others	Old lady	(final film role)
