= A Sleeping Clergyman =

1933 play by James Bridie

- Original theatre programme
- Written by: James Bridie
- Original language: English
- Setting: A Club in Glasgow; A Lodging Near the High Street, Glasgow; A Victorian Bedroom; A Seaside Cliff Nea

Premiere
- Date premiered: 29 July 1933
- Place premiered: Malvern Festival Theatre

A Sleeping Clergyman is a 1933 play in Two Acts by James Bridie. Directed by H. K. Ayliff, it opened at Malvern's Festival Theatre in July 1933, before moving to London's Piccadilly Theatre in September, where it ran for 230 performances. It then transferred to Broadway's Guild Theatre in October 1934, where it closed after 40 performances. It was revived, again with Robert Donat, at London’s Criterion Theatre in 1947.

== Plot ==
Hereditary evil runs through three generations of a medical family, in the 'conflict of social morality and natural desires' - the dissolute and murderous Camerons (from 1867 to 1935) - before a son and daughter finally redeem the family name.

== Original cast ==
- A Sleeping Clergyman ... Godfrey Baxter
- Dr. Cooper ... Wilson Coleman
- Dr. Coots ... Alexander Sarner
- Wilkinson ... Frank Moore
- Charles Cameron the First ... Robert Donat
- Mrs. Hannah ... Beatrix Feilden-Kaye
- Dr. Marshall ... Ernest Thesiger
- Harriet Marshall ... Dorice Fordred
- Cousin Minnie ... Sophie Stewart
- Aunt Walker ... Isabel Thornton
- Wilhelmina Cameron ... Dorice Fordred
- John Hannah ... Bruce Belfrage
- A Sergeant ... Arthur Hambling
- A Constable ... John Rae
- Charles Cameron the Second ... Robert Donat
- Donovan ... Walter Roy
- Lady Todd Walker ... Eileen Beldon
- Sir Douglas Todd Walker ... Evelyn Roberts
- Hope Cameron ... Dorice Fordred
- Little Thing ... Phyllis Shand
- Dr. Purley ... Whitmore Humphreys
- Lady Katherine Helliwell ... Pamela Carme
- Dr. Coutts ... Alexander Sarner
- A Medical Student ... Kenneth Fraser

== Adaptations ==
The play was later adapted for radio and broadcast on the BBC's Saturday Night Theatre on 1 January 1949. A televised version was also broadcast by the BBC, in its Sunday Night Theatre slot on 11 January 1959.
