= Arthur Wimperis =

English dramatist and screenwriter (1874–1953)

1909 postcard: The Arcadians, with lyrics by Wimperis

Arthur Harold Wimperis (3 December 1874 – 14 October 1953) was an English playwright, lyricist and screenwriter, who contributed lyrics and libretti to popular Edwardian musical comedies written for the stage. With the advent of talking films, he switched to screenwriting, finding even greater success in this medium.

Early in his career, Wimperis was an illustrator. For 25 years beginning in 1906, he wrote lyrics and libretti for musical comedies, including the hit The Arcadians in 1909 and many others. After serving in the First World War, he resumed his career, writing for shows like Princess Charming (1926). Beginning in 1930, he moved into writing screenplays for British films, and, by 1940, for Hollywood films, contributing to dozens of screenplays. He won an Oscar for his contribution to the screenplay of Mrs. Miniver (1942) and was nominated for another Oscar for his contribution to the screenplay of Random Harvest (1942). He continued writing screenplays until his death.

== Biography ==
Wimperis was born in London, the son of the painter Edmund Morison Wimperis and Anne Harry Edmonds. Educated at Dulwich College and University College London, he began a career as an illustrator on the Daily Graphic. This was soon interrupted by service in the Second Boer War from 1899 to 1902 with Paget's Horse.

=== 1906–1930: Theatre and songwriting years ===
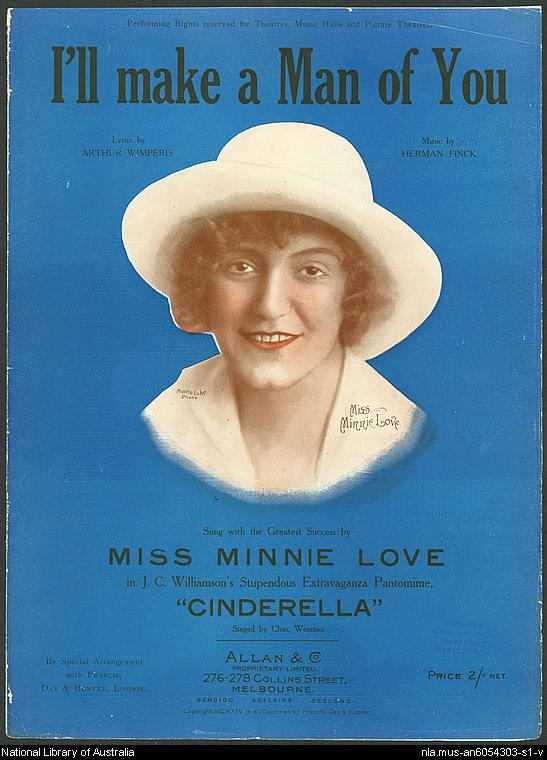
1914 sheet music

Wimperis then began a theatre writing career as a lyricist and librettist for Edwardian musical comedies in London. His first major show was The Dairymaids (1906), which was favourably reviewed by The Times, though the derivative nature of the plot was noted, as was the similarity between the lyrics for the song "Mary in the Dairy" and an earlier Punch magazine parody of a musical comedy number which contained the words, "Mary, Mary, managed a dairy". This similarity was attributed to the paucity of rhymes for Mary, rather than deliberate plagiarism. The show was followed by The Gay Gordons written with Seymour Hicks in 1907. He next contributed songs (including "The Pipes of Pan", "I've Got a Motter", "Arcady Is Always Young", and "Half Past Two") for one of the most popular musicals of the Edwardian age, The Arcadians (1909), as well as to the short-lived The Mountaineers. In addition to contributing lyrics or dialogue to other shows, he then began adapting Viennese operettas into English. The best-known of these are The Balkan Princess (1910) and The Girl in the Taxi (Die keusche Susanne; 1912). He also wrote for The Sunshine Girl (1912). Wimperis also wrote lyrics for reviews such as The Follies and The Passing Show of 1914, and many of his songs became music hall hits, such as "Gilbert the Filbert" and "I'll Make a Man of You".

He served in the Royal Artillery as a temporary second lieutenant during the First World War, and then resumed playwriting and songwriting, including for My Lady Frayle (1916) and Pamela (1917). In 1925, he wrote the English-language adaptation of for the American production of Sigmund Romberg's Louie the Fourteenth, and the next year he had another hit with Princess Charming in London. His last London success was a vehicle for Binnie Hale in 1930 called Nippy. Wimperis also contributed lyrics and scenes to many other reviews and musicals in London and New York and created English-language adaptations of several French and German plays.

=== 1930–1953: Film years ===
Wimperis then wrote screenplays and additional dialogue for British films. His first major film was Harmony Heaven in 1930. His film career quickly began to flourish under the guidance of director and producer Alexander Korda. He collaborated on many screenplays with Lajos Bíró. Some of his best-known films of the 1930s were Men of Tomorrow (1932), Wedding Rehearsal (1932), Cash (1933), The Private Life of Henry VIII (1933), The Private Life of Don Juan (1934), Catherine the Great (1934), The Scarlet Pimpernel (1934), Princess Charming (1934), Brewster's Millions (1935), Knight Without Armour (1937), The Divorce of Lady X (1938), The Drum (1938) and The Four Feathers (1939).

Wimperis also wrote the lyrics for the songs heard in the Paul Robeson film Sanders of the River (1936). In the 1940s, and until his death, Wimperis worked in Hollywood for MGM. He survived the sinking of the passenger liner SS City of Benares while crossing the Atlantic in 1940 at the height of the Second World War during the Battle of the Atlantic; it was torpedoed by a Nazi submarine. He escaped in a lifeboat with 32 people aboard (only 8 of them survived) and was rescued by HMS Hurricane. He won an Academy Award for Best Writing for his contribution to the screenplay of Mrs. Miniver (1942), in which he also had a small acting part. He was also nominated for another Oscar for his contribution to the screenplay of Random Harvest (1942). His later films included If Winter Comes (1947), Julia Misbehaves (1948), The Red Danube (1949), That Forsyte Woman (1949), Calling Bulldog Drummond (1951), Young Bess (1953) and Storm Over the Nile (1955).

Wimperis died in Maidenhead, Berkshire, England, at the age of 78.

== Selected filmography ==
- Harmony Heaven (1930)
- The Man They Couldn't Arrest (1931)
- Men of Tomorrow (1932)
- That Night in London (1932)
- Wedding Rehearsal (1932)
- Cash (1933)
- The Private Life of Henry VIII (1933)
- The Private Life of Don Juan (1934)
- Catherine the Great (1934)
- The Scarlet Pimpernel (1934)
- Princess Charming (1934)
- Brewster's Millions (1935)
- Sanders of the River (1936, lyrics only)
- Knight Without Armour (1937)
- The Divorce of Lady X (1938)
- The Drum (1938)
- The Four Feathers (1939)
- Mrs. Miniver (1942)
- Random Harvest (1942)
- If Winter Comes (1947)
- Julia Misbehaves (1948)
- The Red Danube (1949)
- That Forsyte Woman (1949)
- Calling Bulldog Drummond (1951)
- Young Bess (1953)
- Storm Over the Nile (1955)
- The Fourth War (1990, songs only)
