= That Night in London =

1932 film

- American poster
- Directed by: Rowland V. Lee
- Written by: Dorothy Greenhill; Arthur Wimperis
- Produced by: Alexander Korda
- Starring: Robert Donat; Pearl Argyle; Miles Mander; Roy Emerton
- Cinematography: Bernard Browne; Robert Martin
- Edited by: Stephen Harrison
- Music by: Peter Mendoza
- Distributed by: Paramount British Pictures
- Release date: August 1932
- Running time: 78 minutes
- Country: United Kingdom
- Language: English

That Night in London (U.S. title: Over-Night; also known as Bright Lights of London) is a 1932 British crime film directed by Rowland V. Lee and starring Robert Donat, Pearl Argyle, Miles Mander and Roy Emerton. It was written by Dorothy Greenhill and Arthur Wimperis, and produced as a quota quickie by Alexander Korda.

== Preservation status ==
The British Film Institute National Archive holds a collection of stills but no film or video materials.

== Premise ==
A young bank clerk steals £500 and plans to go on a spree before shooting himself but a bad girl turned good tries to convince him to return the money and stay alive.

== Cast ==
- Robert Donat as Dick Warren
- Pearl Argyle as Eve Desborough
- Miles Mander as Harry Tresham
- Roy Emerton as Captain Paulson
- Graham Soutten as Bert
- Laurence Hanray as Ribbles
- Eugene Leahy as bank manager
- James Knight as Inspector Brody
- James Bucton as Inspector Ryan

== Reception ==
Film Weekly wrote: "Well told, apart from one or-two weak touches, and well acted. Quite good entertainment."

Kine Weekly wrote: "Crook drama, which, after opening a little flatly, develops into a picture with very good situations, holding interest through to the end. . thoroughly worth-while British picture."
