= The Divorce of Lady X =

- Film poster
- Directed by: Tim Whelan
- Written by: Lajos Bíró (adaptation); Ian Dalrymple (scenario)
- Based on: Counsel's Opinion; 1931 play by Gilbert Wakefield
- Produced by: Alexander Korda
- Starring: Laurence Olivier; Merle Oberon; Binnie Barnes; Ralph Richardson
- Cinematography: Harry Stradling
- Edited by: Walter Stokvis
- Music by: Miklós Rózsa; Lionel Salter
- Color process: Technicolor
- Production company: London Films
- Distributed by: United Artists
- Release date: 15 January 1938
- Running time: 92 minutes
- Country: United Kingdom
- Language: English
- Budget: $500,000 or £99,000

The Divorce of Lady X is a 1938 British Technicolor romantic comedy film produced by London Films; it stars Merle Oberon, Laurence Olivier, Ralph Richardson and Binnie Barnes. It was directed by Tim Whelan and produced by Alexander Korda from a screenplay by Ian Dalrymple and Arthur Wimperis, adapted by Lajos Bíró from the play Counsel's Opinion by Gilbert Wakefield. The music score was by Miklós Rózsa and Lionel Salter and the cinematography by Harry Stradling.

The film is a remake of the 1933 film Counsel's Opinion, also from London Films and in which Binnie Barnes appeared in the role played by Merle Oberon.

== Plot ==
A thick evening fog strands party guests at a London hotel. All rooms are taken. Leslie Steele, a young, pretty but madcap socialite, barges her way into Everard Logan's suite. He promptly registers one objection after another, but all efforts to evict Leslie fail. So Logan strikes a compromise, allowing her use of the bedroom, while he takes another room in the suite. She spends the entire time teasing and taunting him. By breakfast, Logan changes his tune and insists they meet again. But while he's out of the room, dressing, she mysteriously bolts for home, which she shares with her grandfather, a judge.

He informs her that Logan is a barrister specializing in divorce cases. The zany, impulsive Ms. Steele then tells her grandfather she intends to marry Logan. To her surprise, she learns Logan will be pleading a case before her grandfather's court that day. So she attends the proceeding to observe her intended in action – and to her further surprise, she sees him mercilessly rip to shreds a woman accused of adultery.

As Leslie and Everard spend the rest of the film struggling to adjust to each other's whims and differences, a subplot involving Lord Mere, one of Logan's clients, is interwoven into the story-line. A confusion of identities ensues, as at one point, Logan is led to mistakenly believe that Leslie is actually Lord Mere's wife. But after a weekend fox hunt at the lord's manor, all conflicts are satisfactorily explained away, and the two lovers are reconciled.

By the end, Leslie has successfully transformed Everard from the inhumane, hostile, woman-browbeating counselor she witnessed earlier into an empathetic, understanding, sensitive courtroom-interrogator of "the gentle sex".

== Cast ==
- Merle Oberon as Leslie Steele
- Laurence Olivier as Everard Logan
- Binnie Barnes as Claire, Lady Mere
- Ralph Richardson as Lord Mere
- Morton Selten as Lord Steele
- Victor Rietti as hotel manager
- J. H. Roberts as Slade
- Gertrude Musgrove as Saunders, the maid
- Gus McNaughton as room service waiter
- H. B. Hallam as Jefferies, the butler
- Eileen Peel as Mrs. Johnson
- Lewis Gilbert as Tom

== Critical reception ==
A reviewer for Variety wrote: "Alexander Korda's Technicolored comedy is rich, smart entertainment", and also praised the acting: "Oberon impresses. Olivier does his role pretty well, retarded somewhat by an annoying bit of pouting business. Two key performances which sparkle are those of Ralph Richardson and Morton Selten". whereas several decades later, Leonard Maltin described the film as a "Cute but extremely dated screwball comedy,"; and the Radio Times found the whole thing "quite amusing...in a daft and inconsequential way".

Emanuel Levy gave the film a "C" grade and wrote that "Though opulent in color costumes and design, this minor British screwball comedy is mostly known for its on-screen teaming of two young actors, Laurence Olivier and Ralph Richardson, in their pre-Hollywood era, who would become legendary stars".
