= Zoltan Korda =

Hungarian-born filmmaker (1895–1961)

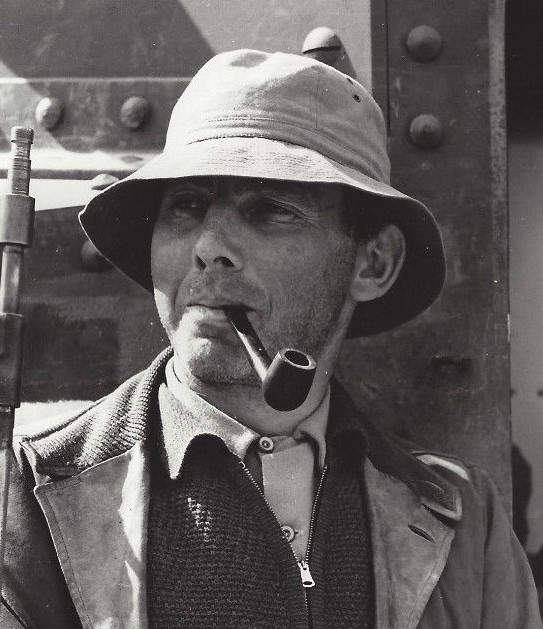
- Korda on the set of Sahara, 1943
- Born: Kellner Zoltán; May 3, 1895; Pusztatúrpásztó, Túrkeve, Austria-Hungary (now Hungary)
- Died: October 13, 1961 (aged 66); Hollywood, California, U.S.
- Occupations: Screenwriter; film director; producer
- Years active: 1918–1955
- Spouses: Olly Szokolay (m. 1921; div. 1924) Joan Gardner (m. 1930)
- Children: 2
- Family: Alexander Korda (brother); Vincent Korda (brother); Michael Korda (nephew); Chris Korda (great-niece)

Zoltan Korda (born Zoltán Kellner; May 3, 1895 – October 13, 1961) was a Hungarian-born motion picture screenwriter, director and producer. He made his first film in Hungary in 1918 and worked with his brother Alexander Korda on film-making there and in London. They both moved to the United States in 1940 to Hollywood and the American film industry.

== Early life and education ==
(Kellner Zoltán, in Hungarian name order), of Jewish heritage, in Pusztatúrpásztó, Túrkeve, Hungary (then Austria-Hungary), he was the middle brother of Alexander and Vincent Korda, all of whom became filmmakers. Before leaving Hungary to work full-time in London with his brother Alexander, he (Zoltán) served in the Hungarian Army as a cavalry officer.

== Career ==
As a young man, Korda went to work with his brother Alexander in their native Hungary and in the United Kingdom for his London Films production company. He functioned as a camera operator; for a time he worked in film editing and as a screenwriter. In 1918 and 1920 in Hungary, he directed two silent film shorts and a feature-length silent film in Germany in 1927.

In London, he made his English-language directorial debut with the sound drama Men of Tomorrow (1932). He gained wide respect for the adventure film Sanders of the River (1935), starring the American actor Paul Robeson and Leslie Banks. The film proved a significant commercial and critical success, giving Korda the first of his four nominations for "Best Film" at the Venice Film Festival. Korda and Robert Flaherty won the Venice festival's "Best Director" award for Elephant Boy (1937).

A former cavalry officer in the Common Army, afterwards in the Austro-Hungarian Army in World War I, Korda made a number of military action/adventure films, many of which were filmed in Africa or India. Of his directorial efforts, 1939's The Four Feathers, starring Sir Ralph Richardson, is considered his greatest cinematic accomplishment. Of lasting significance, the film was nominated for the Palme d'Or at the 1939 Cannes Film Festival. In 2002 it was presented again by the Festival committee in retrospect.

In 1940, Zoltan Korda joined his brother Alexander in Hollywood, Los Angeles, California. Working through United Artists, he served as executive producer of The Thief of Bagdad. Zoltan Korda spent the rest of his life in southern California. He made another seven films, including the acclaimed 1943 World War II drama, Sahara (1943), for which he wrote the screenplay. It starred Humphrey Bogart. His films included A Woman's Vengeance (1947) with Charles Boyer and Jessica Tandy and the anti-apartheid film Cry, the Beloved Country.

== Marriage and family ==
Korda married Olly Szokolay in 1921, divorcing in 1924. Korda married the British actress and dancer Joan Gardner in 1930. They were together until his death. They had 2 sons, David and Nicholas. The extended family's colorful history is the subject of a book by Zoltan's nephew Michael Korda, Charmed Lives.

Poor health, brought on years earlier from a battle with tuberculosis, forced Zoltan Korda's retirement in 1955. He died in 1961 in Hollywood after a lengthy illness. He was buried in the Hollywood Memorial Park Cemetery.

== Filmography ==
Year	Title	Director	Writer	Notes
1927	The Eleven Devils	Yes	No	Co-directed with Carl Boese
1930	Women Everywhere	No	Yes	
1932	Men of Tomorrow	Yes	No	Lost film
1933	Cash	Yes	No	
1935	Sanders of the River	Yes	No	
1936	Conquest of the Air	co-director	No	
1936	Forget Me Not	Yes	No	
1937	Elephant Boy	Yes	No	
1938	The Drum	Yes	No	
1939	The Four Feathers	Yes	No	
1940	The Thief of Bagdad	Uncredited	No	
1942	Jungle Book	Yes	No	
1943	Sahara	Yes	Yes	
1945	Counter-Attack	Yes	No	
1947	The Macomber Affair	Yes	No	
1948	A Woman's Vengeance	Yes	No	
1951	Cry, the Beloved Country	Yes	No	
1955	Storm Over the Nile	Yes	No	Co-directed with Terence Young
