= Perfect Strangers (1945 film) =

1945 British drama film

- A poster with the film's US title: Vacation from Marriage
- Directed by: Alexander Korda
- Screenplay by: Clemence Dane; Anthony Pelissier
- Story by: Clemence Dane
- Produced by: Alexander Korda
- Starring: Robert Donat; Deborah Kerr
- Cinematography: Georges Périnal
- Edited by: Edward B. Jarvis
- Music by: Clifton Parker
- Production companies: London Films; Metro-Goldwyn-Mayer
- Distributed by: Metro-Goldwyn-Mayer
- Release date: 15 October 1945 (London)
- Running time: 102 minutes (UK); 93 minutes (US)
- Country: United Kingdom
- Language: English

Perfect Strangers (United States title: Vacation from Marriage), is a 1945 British drama film produced and directed by Alexander Korda and starring Robert Donat and Deborah Kerr. It was written by Clemence Dane and Anthony Pelissier based on a story by Dane. The music score was by Clifton Parker and the cinematography by Georges Périnal.

== Plot ==
Robert and Cathy Wilson are a timid married couple in 1940 London. He is a bookkeeper, she a bored housewife. However, their tedious lives are changed by the war. He enlists in the Royal Navy, and she joins the Women's Royal Naval Service. During the three years the couple are apart (their shore leaves never coincide), they are transformed, each becoming much more self-confident.

Dizzy Clayton, Cathy's assertive new friend, helps her break out of her shell. She begins going out with Dizzy's cousin, naval architect Richard, who falls in love with her. However, she remains unenthusiastically faithful to her husband.

Meanwhile, Robert becomes tougher on sea duty, and in time, he becomes a petty officer. His hands are badly burned when his ship is sunk, but he stoically rows in the lifeboat for five days without complaint. He recuperates in a hospital, tended by Elena, a beautiful nurse. On the last night of his stay, he asks her out to dinner. He is attracted to her, but she informs him that she lost her beloved husband only six months earlier, kisses him, and leaves.

Robert and Cathy both receive 10-day leaves, but each dreads being reunited with the dowdy spouse each remembers and being forced back into the dreary life they shared.

Cathy cannot bring herself to return to her flat, where Robert is waiting. Instead, she phones Robert, asking him to talk with her on more neutral ground and blurting that she wants to leave him. He is furious. They meet on the street in the pitch dark of the blackout. To her surprise, Robert readily agrees to a divorce, telling her that he was going to ask her for one. They go to the neighbourhood pub to discuss the divorce, and for the first time in three years, they see the transformation in the other.

Throughout the film, they have been talking to their new friends about their life together, and now they revisit those issues and talk to each other about the past. They find that they are "perfect strangers" now. For Cathy, the view from their flat, all walls and smoking chimneys, is a symbol of their lives before the war. They dance with each other for the first time, and they are attracted.

Dizzy and Robert's friend Scotty meet them in the pub. Both are stunned. Dizzy thinks Cathy is crazy. Scotty calls Cathy a pin-up, but the compliment goes wrong when he shares Robert's unflattering descriptions of the 'old' Cathy. She is insulted and furious. It hardens her heart, and she leaves as the pub closes.

Outside, waiting in vain for a taxi in the bombed-out intersection, the argument continues—they even fight over where the shops were formerly located. In the end, Scotty goes to his billet, leaving Robert on the street. The girls go to the flat, where Cathy wistfully tells Dizzy about how she and Robert met.

Robert returns to retrieve his gear and finds Cathy sitting in the corner of the windowseat. The sky is bright with early morning light, and beyond the shattered houses, the vista toward the river is broken only by a church steeple. The high walls and smoking chimneys are gone. Robert opens the window, letting in the sounds of the city. A clock strikes 5. He turns to look at Cathy, saying “Well, you've certainly got the view you always wanted.”

“Miles and miles of it,” she replies. “But oh Robert, the desolation.”

“Poor old London,” he says, looking out the window. “Well, we'll just have to build it up again. That's all.”

“It will take years and years,” Cathy says, her eyes on him.

He reaches out to put his hand on hers, and then turns toward her, saying “Well, what does that matter? We're young.” Cathy lifts her head to meet him, and they embrace passionately.

== Cast ==
- Robert Donat as Robert Wilson
- Deborah Kerr as Catherine Wilson
- Glynis Johns as Dizzy Clayton
- Ann Todd as Elena
- Roland Culver as Richard
- Elliott Mason as Mrs. Hemmings (uncredited)

Cast notes

- Deborah Kerr made her MGM debut in this film. MGM had purchased half of her contract after her performance in Michael Powell and Emeric Pressburger's The Life and Death of Colonel Blimp, in which she played three roles. MGM studio boss Louis B. Mayer is supposed to have said "That girl's a star" upon seeing her performance in Perfect Strangers, and she was soon an established MGM property.
- This was Robert Donat's last film for MGM.
- Roger Moore made his uncredited film debut in Perfect Strangers.

== Production ==
Perfect Strangers was meant to be the first of a number of British-made co-productions between Alexander Korda and M-G-M. Other proposed projects included Lottie Dundass with Vivien Leigh from a story by Edith Bagnold, a biopic of Robert Louis Stevenson starring Robert Donat, a version of War and Peace directed by Orson Welles and starring Korda's wife, Merle Oberon, and an untitled Carol Reed project. Perfect Strangers was meant to star Donat and Oberon but by December 1943 Oberon had been replaced by Deborah Kerr as Oberon was still in the U.S. Wesley Ruggles was to come from Hollywood to direct.

By March 1944, the film was about to start filming at Denham Studios. Korda announced he would now make only one to three films per year, compared to the 12 to 16 he had previously intended to make.

Shooting did not begin until May. The delay had come about for several reasons: the script was constantly rewritten to account for changes in the war, Ruggles fell ill with the flu shortly after he arrived in England, and Donat was involved in a play. Then Donat fell ill and Ruggles left the project after an argument with Korda. It was the first feature Korda had directed since Rembrandt. As they set to work, Korda called the film an "allegory of England"; Donat said: "It's a lyrical comedy – we hope."

The film did some location shooting in Scotland, but was shot primarily in London.

No subsequent films came from the agreement, because Korda bristled at being bossed around by MGM's head of production, Louis B. Mayer.

== Reception ==
=== Box office ===
Perfect Strangers was a commercial success in both the UK and the US. It was one of the bigger hits at the British box office in 1945, ranked 22nd according to Kinematograph Weekly.

=== Critical ===
In the New York Times, Bosley Crowther wrote the script was an intelligent treatment of "the simple and leisurely story" and the leading actors "excellent as the principals, who find that love, like devastated London, can be rebuilt". He wrote that Korda's direction "tells an oft-told tale but tells it easily and well".

== Accolades ==
Clemence Dane won an Academy Award for Best Original Motion Picture Story.
