= Men of Tomorrow (1932 film) =

1932 British film

- Release poster
- Directed by: Zoltan Korda; Leontine Sagan
- Written by: Anthony Gibbs; Arthur Wimperis
- Produced by: Alexander Korda
- Starring: Maurice Braddell; Joan Gardner; Emlyn Williams; Robert Donat; Merle Oberon
- Cinematography: Philip Tannura
- Music by: Kurt Schröder
- Production company: London Films
- Distributed by: British Paramount; British & Dominions Film Corporation
- Release date: 1 October 1932
- Running time: 88 minutes
- Country: United Kingdom
- Language: English

Men of Tomorrow (also known as Young Apollo) is a 1932 lost British drama film directed by Zoltan Korda and Leontine Sagan, produced by Alexander Korda and written by Anthony Gibbs and Arthur Wimperis. It stars Maurice Braddell, Joan Gardner and Emlyn Williams and features Robert Donat's movie debut.

Donat and Merle Oberon were given top billing when Men of Tomorrow was distributed in the United States in 1935.

== Preservation status ==
The BFI National Archive holds ephemera and stills, but no film or video materials. It is listed as one of the British Film Institute's "75 Most Wanted" lost films.

== Plot ==
Allen Shepherd is an Oxford University graduate. He has become a successful novelist and has married Jane Anderson. A firm proponent of traditional sex roles, Shepherd leaves Jane when she accepts a teaching post at Oxford. He later changes his views, and the couple are reunited.

== Cast ==
- Maurice Braddell as Allan Shepherd
- Joan Gardner as Jane Anderson
- Emlyn Williams as Horners
- Robert Donat as Julian Angell
- Merle Oberon as Ysobel d'Aunay
- John Traynor as Mr. Waters
- Esther Kiss as Maggie
- Annie Esmond as Mrs. Oliphant
- Charles Carson as Senior Proctor

== Reception ==
Film Weekly wrote: "Although it fails to work out its theme properly, and never really grips, this is an unusual film of special interest. Leontine Sagan's direction reveals the insight and skill expected of her, but she is let down by the story. ... This matrimonial stuff raises grave doubts of whether Men of To-Morrow [sic] is meant to be a screen treatise or just a popular entertainment. As a matter of fact, it is neither the one nor the other. Its intellectual side is marred by its 'popular' side – and vice versa."

Kine Weekly wrote: "The story is clearly told, the characterisation is flawless, and the detail and dialogue are excellent. Leontine Sagan, the producer of Mädchen in Uniform, has directed the picture with amazing understanding and imagination ... Maurice Brafdall gives a sensitive and finely graduated study as Allan, and ably suggests an unfortunate but nevertheless definite type. Joan Gardner is very charming and human as Jane and Emlyn Williams is delightful 'and possesses a strong sense of humour in a prominent supporting role. The rest of the cast is flawless."

Picture Show wrote: "Interesting and sensitive film of a student's rebellion against University traditions. Brilliantly directed, convincing settings and beautifully acted."
