= The Magic Box =

1951 British drama film by John Boulting

- Theatrical release poster
- Directed by: John Boulting
- Written by: Ray Allister (biography); Eric Ambler (screenplay)
- Produced by: Ronald Neame
- Starring: Robert Donat; Margaret Johnston; Maria Schell; Robert Beatty; Margaret Rutherford
- Cinematography: Jack Cardiff
- Edited by: Richard Best
- Music by: William Alwyn
- Distributed by: British Lion Films
- Release date: 1951 (UK)
- Running time: 118 minutes
- Country: United Kingdom
- Language: English
- Budget: £220,000 or $700,000
- Box office: £82,398 (UK)

The Magic Box is a 1951 British Technicolor biographical drama film directed by John Boulting. The film stars Robert Donat as William Friese-Greene, with numerous cameo appearances by performers such as Peter Ustinov and Laurence Olivier.

Produced by Ronald Neame and distributed by British Lion Film Corporation, the film was made as part of the Festival of Britain and adapted by Eric Ambler from a biography by Ray Allister.

The film presents a dramatized account of the life of Friese-Greene, one of the earliest inventors to design and patent a working cinematic camera. Told largely in flashback, the story follows his passionate pursuit of motion picture technology and its impact on his financial stability and personal life.

== Plot ==
The film begins in 1921, where British inventor William Friese-Greene, in severe financial distress, attends a London film industry conference. The story unfolds through a series of flashbacks.

The first is told from the perspective of Edith Friese-Greene, who recounts to a friend how she met "Willie". They marry and have four sons, but the family is continually plagued by financial difficulties due to his obsession with developing colour film. Their three eldest sons eventually lie about their ages to enlist in the army during the First World War. The persistent strain leads Edith to leave him.

Back in 1921, Friese-Greene is disheartened by the conference attendees, who appear interested only in the commercial aspects of filmmaking. When he tries to speak, he is ignored. He slips into a longer flashback reflecting on his early career.

In this extended flashback, young "Willie" works as assistant to photographer Maurice Guttenberg, who refuses to allow him creative freedom. After disagreeing over portrait techniques, he leaves to open his own studio with his new wife, Helena, a former client. Though initially successful with multiple studios, his interest shifts to developing moving pictures and colour processes, often at the expense of his profitable photography work.

He abandons his wife at a choir concert to visit photographic pioneer Fox Talbot, returning home elated by the meeting. Friese-Greene relocates to London and partners with businessman Arthur Collings to continue his film experiments. Although Collings initially supports him, the growing financial burden forces him to end the partnership. Friese-Greene mortgages his home to raise additional funds.

One Sunday, he skips church to film relatives in Hyde Park with his new camera. That night, he develops the footage and watches, entranced, as light flickers across the images.

Although Friese-Greene tells his wife they will soon be millionaires, he is declared bankrupt. Helena collapses in a side office at the court. A doctor advises a year of rest, but she secretly tears up the expensive prescription on the way home. She sells her jewellery to fund a new studio for her husband. On his birthday—forgotten by him—she gives him a prism, which he receives with joy.

Back at the 1921 conference, Friese-Greene rises again, clutching film reels. He declares cinema a "universal language" before collapsing mid-speech. A doctor arrives too late, finding only enough money in his pockets for a cinema ticket.

== Cast ==
- Robert Donat as William Friese-Greene
- Margaret Johnston as Edith Harrison
- Maria Schell as Helena Friese-Greene
- David Oake as Claude Friese-Greene
- Janette Scott as Ethel Friese-Greene
- John Howard Davies as Maurice Friese-Greene
- Robert Beatty as Lord Beaverbrook
- Richard Attenborough as Jack Carter
- Basil Sydney as William Fox Talbot
- Bernard Miles as Cousin Alfred
- Eric Portman as Arthur Collings
- Mary Ellis as Mrs Collings
- Muir Mathieson as Sir Arthur Sullivan
- Joyce Grenfell as Mrs Claire
- Dennis Price as Harold, the man who gathers Willie's possessions
- Margaret Rutherford as Lady Pond
- Mervyn Johns as Goitz
- Glynis Johns as May Jones
- Frederick Valk as Maurice Guttenberg
- Ronald Shiner as the Fairground Barker
- Peter Reynolds as Bridegroom

=== Cameos ===
- Barry Jones as a doctor
- Bessie Love as wedding group member
- Cecil Parker at the Connaught Rooms
- Cecil Trouncer as John Rudge
- David Tomlinson as a Willie's lab assistant
- Emlyn Williams as a Bank Manager
- Ernest Thesiger as "man"
- Kay Walsh as a receptionist
- Laurence Olivier and Jack Hulbert as police officers
- Leo Genn as a doctor
- Marius Goring as an estate agent
- Michael Denison as a reporter
- Michael Hordern as the Official Receiver
- Miles Malleson as an orchestra conductor
- Peter Ustinov as an "industry man" in audience
- Sheila Sim as a nursemaid
- Sid James as an army sergeant in payroom
- Stanley Holloway as a broker's man come to collect goods in lieu of rent
- Thora Hird as a housekeeper
- William Hartnell as a Recruiting sergeant
- Googie Withers, A. E. Matthews, John McCallum, Patrick Holt, Robertson Hare, Richard Murdoch and Sybil Thorndike as sitters
- Henry Edwards as the Butler at Fox Talbot's
- Renée Asherson as Miss Tagg
- Martin Boddey as Sitter in Bath Studio
- Edward Chapman as Father in family group
- Maurice Colbourne as Bride's father in wedding group
- Roland Culver as 1st Company promoter
- Joan Dowling as Maggie
- Marjorie Fielding as Elderly Viscountess
- Robert Flemyng as Doctor in surgery
- Everley Gregg as Bridegroom's mother in wedding group
- Kathleen Harrison as Mother in family group
- Joan Hickson as Mrs Stukely
- Jack Hulbert as 1st Holborn Policeman
- Peter Jones as Industry Man who picks up Willie when he falls
- Ann Lancaster as Bridesmaid in Wedding Group
- Herbert Lomas as Warehouse manager
- John Longden as Speaker in Connaught rooms
- Garry Marsh as Second company promoter
- Michael Trubshawe as Sitter in Bath studio
- Amy Veness as Grandmother in wedding group
- Charles Victor as Industry man
- Harcourt Williams as Tom
- Frank Pettingell as Bridegroom's father in Wedding Group
- Norman Pierce as Speaker in Connaught rooms
- Michael Redgrave as Mr. Lege the instrument maker who creates the movie camera
- Oda Slobodskaya as Soloist at Bath concert
- John Stuart as 2nd Platform man at Connaught
- Sally Smith as Little girl
- Marianne Stone as Bride in wedding group

== Production ==
Half the budget was provided by the National Film Finance Corporation (NFFC). The film was made by Festival Film Productions, a semi-cooperative to which all major British film companies contributed their services either free or on a reduced rate basis.

== Release ==
The film was completed and shown just before the end of the 1951 Festival of Britain, but did not enter general release until 1952.

== Reception ==
Writing in The New York Times, critic Bosley Crowther described The Magic Box as "a handsome exercise in pathos and sentiment", though he felt it lacked dramatic grounding or connection to significant historical events. He praised Robert Donat's performance as "superlative", comparing it favourably to his role in Goodbye, Mr. Chips. Crowther also commended the film's visual qualities, particularly its Technicolor cinematography, period setting, and production design, while noting that the screenplay—adapted by Eric Ambler from Ray Allister's biography—was "vague and extended", yet "quaintly eventful and literate".

In the Motion Picture Herald, film historian Terry Ramsaye criticised the film's depiction of Friese-Greene as the father of motion pictures, calling it a "perversion of history" and "an injustice to the very genuine contributions of eminent British scientists and other persons". The producers responded by accusing Ramsaye of prejudice against Friese-Greene.

=== Box office ===
Despite its prestigious ensemble cast, which included numerous cameo appearances by leading British actors, the film performed poorly at the box office and was ultimately regarded as a major financial failure.

== Nominations ==
The film was nominated for two BAFTA Awards in 1952—BAFTA Award for Best Film and BAFTA Award for Best British Film.
