= The Private Life of Don Juan =

1934 film by Alexander Korda

- Theatrical release poster
- Directed by: Alexander Korda
- Written by: Frederick Lonsdale; Lajos Bíró
- Based on: L'homme à la Rose; 1920 play by Henry Bataille
- Produced by: Alexander Korda (uncredited)
- Starring: Douglas Fairbanks; Merle Oberon
- Cinematography: Georges Perinal; Robert LaPresle
- Edited by: Stephen Harrison
- Music by: Ernst Toch
- Production company: London Film Productions
- Distributed by: United Artists
- Release date: 30 November 1934
- Running time: 89 minutes
- Country: United Kingdom
- Language: English
- Budget: $700,000

The Private Life of Don Juan is a 1934 British comedy-drama film directed by Alexander Korda and starring Douglas Fairbanks, Merle Oberon and Benita Hume. At the age of 51, it was the final role of Fairbanks, who died five years later. The film is about the life of the aging Don Juan, based on the 1920 play L'homme à la Rose (English: The Man With the Rose) by Henry Bataille. It was made by Korda's London Film Productions at British & Dominion Studios in Elstree/Borehamwood and distributed by United Artists.

== Plot ==
After twenty years in exile, an aging Don Juan returns to Seville in secret with his friend Leporello trying to keep his health in check. His wife Dolores has threatened to have him thrown in prison because he won't see her after five years of absences. The next morning, he is surprised to find that all the town knows he is back. Rodrigo, an admirer of his, follows Don Juan everywhere, wanting to be just like him, and able to give a good impression of him with his own amorous advances. Don Juan prepares to flee to France but Rodrigo is killed by a jealous husband who believes he is Don Juan and all Seville now believes him dead. A book and play of his exploits are even written as he assumes the life of a Captain in seclusion. He attends his own magnificent funeral; six months later, having found many discomforts when pretending that Don Juan is dead (particularly when his statement of being Don Juan causes amusement and disbelief among his audience), he returns to Seville. His attempts to discredit the play as fiction fall short as no one believes him, even when his "widow" is asked about him. However, the two reunite in bed, complete with him breaking a window to get there.

== Cast ==
- Douglas Fairbanks as Don Juan
- Merle Oberon as Antonita, a dancer of passionate temperament
- Bruce Winston as the cafe manager
- Gina Malo as Pepita, another dancer of equal temperament
- Benita Hume as Dona Dolores, a lady of mystery
- Binnie Barnes as Rosita, a maid pure and simple
- Melville Cooper as Leporello
- Owen Nares as Antonio Martinez, an actor, as actors go
- Heather Thatcher as Anna Dora, an actress, as actresses go
- Diana Napier as a lady of sentiment
- Joan Gardner as Carmen, a young lady of romance
- Gibson Gowland as Don Alfredo, Carmen's Poor Husband
- Barry MacKay as Rodrigo, the Impostor, a Man of Romance
- Claud Allister as The Duke, as Dukes Go
- Athene Seyler as Theresa, the Innkeeper, a Middle Aged Lady of Young Sentiment
- Hindle Edgar as A Jealous Husband
- Natalie Paley as Jealous Husband's Poor Wife
- Patricia Hilliard as The Girl at the Castle, a Young Girl in Love
- Lawrence Grossmith as Pedo, Uncle of the Castle Girl, Who Knows Better
- Clifford Heatherley as Pedro, Don Juan's Young Masseur
- Morland Graham as Hector, Don Juan's Cook
- Edmund Breon as Cardona, the Playwright, as Playwrights Go
- Betty Hamilton as First Tired Businessman's Wife
- Rosita Garcia as Second Tired Businessman's Wife
- John Brownlee as Singer
