= Georges Périnal =

French cinematographer (1897–1965)

- Born: 1897; Paris, France
- Died: 23 April 1965 (aged 67); London, England
- Occupation: cinematographer

Georges Périnal (French pronunciation: [ʒɔʁʒ peʁinal]; 1897 in Paris – 23 April 1965 in London) was a French cinematographer. He is best known for his works with Jean Grémillon, René Clair, Jean Cocteau, Michael Powell, Charlie Chaplin, and Otto Preminger.

== Partial filmography ==
- Six et demi, onze (1927)
- Misdeal (1928)
- The Lighthouse Keepers (1929)
- Les Nouveaux Messieurs (1929)
- The Ladies in the Green Hats (1929)
- Le Sang d'un poète (1930)
- Sous les toits de Paris (1930)
- À nous la liberté (1931)
- The Perfume of the Lady in Black (1931)
- Dainah the Mulatto (1932)
- The Private Life of Henry VIII (1933)
- Catherine the Great (1934)
- The Private Life of Don Juan (1934)
- Sanders of the River (1935)
- Rembrandt (1936)
- The Drum (1938)
- The Four Feathers (1939, nominated for the 1939 Academy Award for Best Cinematography)
- The Thief of Bagdad (1940, winner of the 1940 Academy Award for Best Cinematography)
- Dangerous Moonlight (1941)
- The First of the Few (1942)
- The Life and Death of Colonel Blimp (1943)
- Perfect Strangers (1945)
- An Ideal Husband (1947)
- A Man About the House (1947)
- The Fallen Idol (1948)
- The Mudlark (1950)
- My Daughter Joy (1950)
- No Highway in the Sky (1951)
- Three Cases of Murder (1955)
- Loser Takes All (1956)
- A King in New York (1957)
- Bonjour Tristesse (1958)
- Tom Thumb (1958)
- Oscar Wilde (1960)
- Once More, with Feeling! (1960)
