= London Films =

British film and television production company

- Industry: production
- Founded: 1932
- Founder: Alexander Korda
- Headquarters: Buckinghamshire

The London Films logo in Laurence Olivier's Richard III (1955).

London Films Productions is a British film and television production company founded in 1932 by Alexander Korda and from 1936 based at Denham Film Studios in Buckinghamshire, near London. The company's productions included The Private Life of Henry VIII (1933), Things to Come (1936), Rembrandt (1936), and The Four Feathers (1939). The facility at Denham was taken over in 1939 by Rank and merged with Pinewood to form D & P Studios. The outbreak of war necessitated that The Thief of Bagdad (1940) be completed in California, although Korda's handful of American-made films still displayed Big Ben as their opening corporate logo.

After a restructuring of Korda's UK operations in the late 1940s, London Films were made at Shepperton. One of these was The Third Man (1949). The company's film The Sound Barrier (1952) won the Academy Award for Best Sound. Central Television bought the Korda Film Library from London Films in 1986.

More than 30 years after Korda died in January 1956, the company was acquired by investor Johan Eliasch in 1990 and returned to active film-making in 1991 with Morgan Mason as the chief executive. Titles produced included: Lady Chatterley (tv serial, 1993), directed by Ken Russell and starring Joely Richardson and Sean Bean, Resort to Murder (tv serial, 1995), starring Ben Chaplin, Best of Friends (1991), starring Sir John Gielgud, Dame Wendy Hiller and Patrick McGoohan, and Scarlet Pimpernel (1999), starring Richard E. Grant and Elizabeth McGovern.

== Filmography ==
=== 1930s ===
- Wedding Rehearsal (1932)
- la dame de chez Maxim's (1933)
- Strange Evidence (1933)
- Counsel's Opinion (1933)
- Men of Tomorrow (1933)
- Cash (1933)
- The Private Life of Henry VIII (1933)
- The Girl from Maxim's (1933)
- Catherine the Great (1934)
- The Private Life of the Gannets (1934, documentary short)
- The Private Life of Don Juan (1934)
- The Scarlet Pimpernel (1934)
- Sanders of the River (1935)
- Moscow Nights (1935)
- The Ghost Goes West (1935)
- Things to Come (1936)
- Rembrandt (1936)
- Men Are Not Gods (1936)
- The Man Who Could Work Miracles (1936)
- Forget Me Not (1936)
- Fox Hunt (1936)
- Conquest of the Air (1936)
- A Romance in Flanders (1937)
- Fire Over England (1937)
- Dark Journey (1937)
- Storm in a Teacup (1937)
- Elephant Boy (1937)
- Farewell Again (1937)
- Knight Without Armour (1937)
- Action for Slander (1937)
- Return of the Scarlet Pimpernel (1937)
- I, Claudius (1937) – project abandoned
- The Squeaker (1937)
- Paradise for Two (1937)
- The Divorce of Lady X (1938)
- South Riding (1938)
- The Drum (1938)
- The Challenge (1938)
- Prison Without Bars (1938)
- Q Planes (1939)
- The Four Feathers (1939)
- Over the Moon (1939)
- The Lion Has Wings (1939)
- The Spy in Black (1939)

=== 1940s ===
- 21 Days (1940)
- The Thief of Bagdad (1940)
- Perfect Strangers (1945)
- An Ideal Husband (1947)
- Mine Own Executioner (1947)
- Anna Karenina (1948)
- The Fallen Idol (1948)
- Bonnie Prince Charlie (1948)
- The Small Back Room (1949)
- That Dangerous Age (1949)
- The Last Days of Dolwyn (1949)
- Saints and Sinners (1949)
- The Third Man (1949)

=== 1950s ===
- The Elusive Pimpernel (1950)
- The Cure for Love (1950)
- The Happiest Days of Your Life (1950)
- The Angel with the Trumpet (1950)
- Bridge of Time (1950)
- State Secret (1950)
- My Daughter Joy (1950)
- Seven Days to Noon (1950)
- Gone to Earth (1950; US: The Wild Heart, 1952)
- The Wooden Horse (1950)
- The Long Dark Hall (1951)
- The Wonder Kid (1951)
- The Tales of Hoffmann (1951)
- Lady Godiva Rides Again (1951)
- Mr. Denning Drives North (1951)
- Outcast of the Islands (1952)
- Cry, the Beloved Country (1952)
- The Sound Barrier (1952)
- Home at Seven (1952)
- The Ringer (1952)
- The Holly and the Ivy (1952)
- The Story of Gilbert and Sullivan (1953)
- The Captain's Paradise (1953)
- Twice Upon a Time (1953)
- The Heart of the Matter (1953)
- The Iron Petticoat (1953)
- The Man Between (1953)
- Hobson's Choice (1954)
- Aunt Clara (1954)
- The Belles of St. Trinian's (1954)
- Raising a Riot (1955)
- The Man Who Loved Redheads (1955)
- Richard III (1955)
- The Constant Husband (1955)
- Summertime (1955)
- A Kid for Two Farthings (1955)
- The Deep Blue Sea (1955)
- Storm Over the Nile (1955)
- Smiley (1956)

=== 1970s ===
- Poldark (BBC TV, 1975–1977)

=== 1980s ===
- The Scarlet Pimpernel (1982)
- The Country Girls (1984)
- Kim (1984)

=== 1990s ===
- The Best of Friends (1991)
- The Time Game (1992)
- Big Ideas (1992)
- An Ungentlemanly Act (1992)
- The Scarlet Pimpernel (TV series, 1999)

== Alexander Korda Films Inc. (USA) ==
=== 1930s ===
- The Drum (1938)

=== 1940s ===
- That Hamilton Woman (1941)
- Lydia (1941)
- Jungle Book (1942)
