= Evacuations of civilians in the United Kingdom during the Second World War =

Movement of civilians away from aerial bombardment in British cities in the 1940s

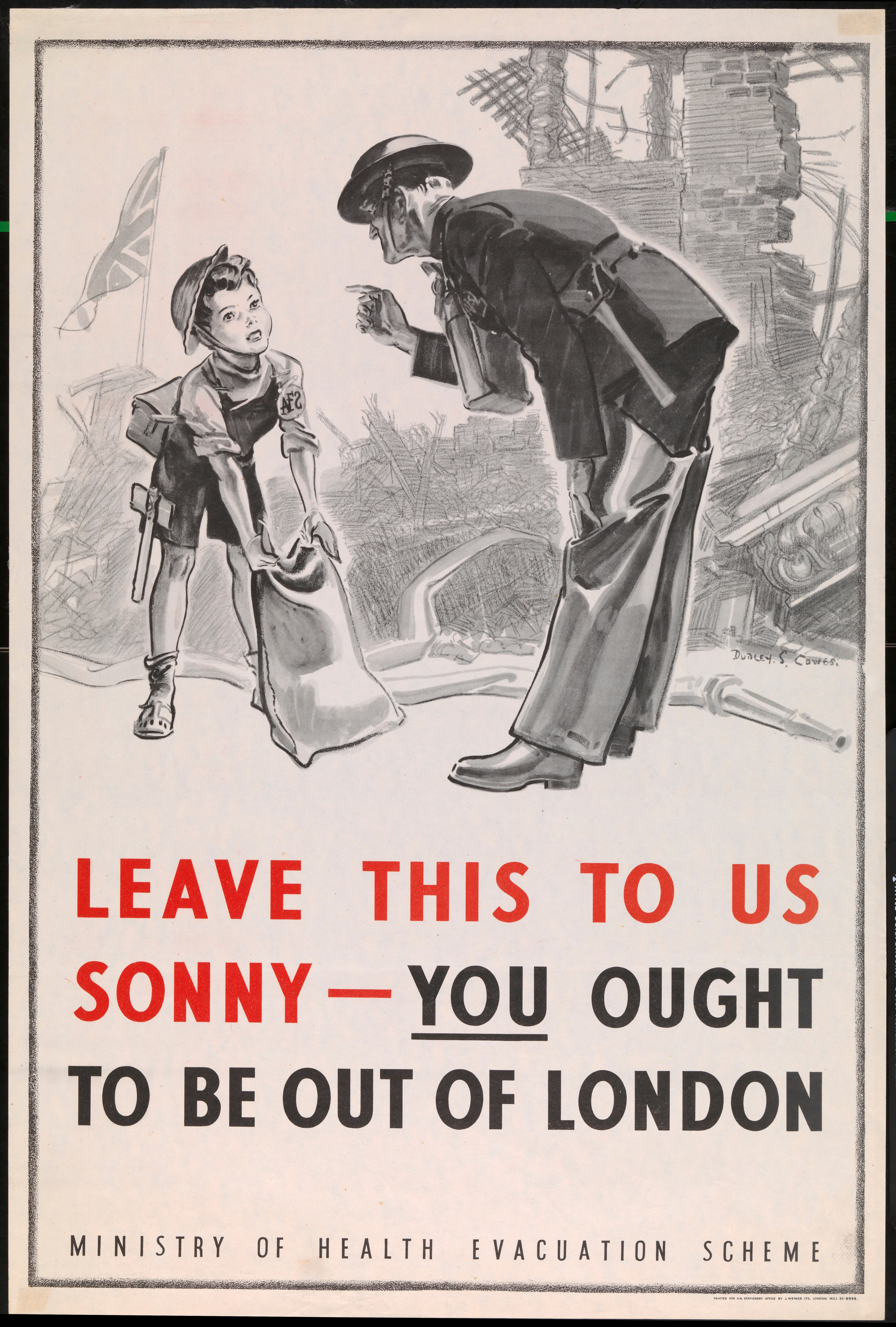
Poster by the Ministry of Health promoting evacuation

The evacuation of civilians in the United Kingdom, during the Second World War, was arranged by the government and private individuals. It was intended to protect vulnerable groups of people, mainly children and mothers of young children, from the dangers of aerial bombing.

The idea of evacuation in the event of war had been considered throughout the interwar period. In the late 1930s, the government had begun planning for a state-organised evacuation programme. The groups eligible for government evacuation were children under the age of fourteen, mothers of children under five and pregnant women. Evacuation was organised by the Ministry of Health in England and Wales and the Scottish Office. Evacuation took place throughout the Second World War and the numbers of evacuees varied depending on levels of concern about air raids. Most evacuees were billeted in private homes; some were placed in institutions. Many remembered evacuation favourably but some were mistreated. Evacuation in Northern Ireland was controlled by the Parliament of Northern Ireland, few evacuees participated in the government scheme there.

Other people privately evacuated themselves, often following air raids; mothers with children sometimes received government subsidies to help with this. Around 13,000 children were privately evacuated abroad to British dominions, the United States or the Republic of Ireland. A short lived public evacuation scheme to the British dominions removed more than 2,000 children in 1940 until it was cancelled after the sinking of SS City of Benares killed most of the evacuees on board. The media and government propaganda promoted evacuation. Evacuation has remained prominent in British collective memory and some historians have argued that it contributed to the development of the postwar welfare state.

== Background ==
Steve Humphries, a historian who has written about family life in the first half of the 20th century, estimated that up to 10 per cent of children in the UK were fully or partially raised by people other than their biological parents. Wealthy households often employed domestic servants to help care for their children and sent them to boarding schools. Impoverished parents or women who gave birth out of wedlock sometimes gave up custody of their children. Adoptions were often arranged informally, while adoption agencies rarely conducted any checks on potential parents. The UK admitted child refugees in the late 1930s, unaccompanied by their parents, 4,000 from war-torn Spain and 10,000 from the territories controlled by Nazi Germany. From the interwar period to the 1960s, charities, churches and local officials arranged for over 130,000 British children living in orphanages to immigrate to Commonwealth countries. This was seen as a way to give them a better quality of life, but many were used as cheap labour and abused in their new countries. Most children in the UK were cared for mainly by their mothers in the first half of the 20th century and most mothers were housewives. Charities and government agencies increasingly tried to assist impoverished mothers and improve the welfare of their children.

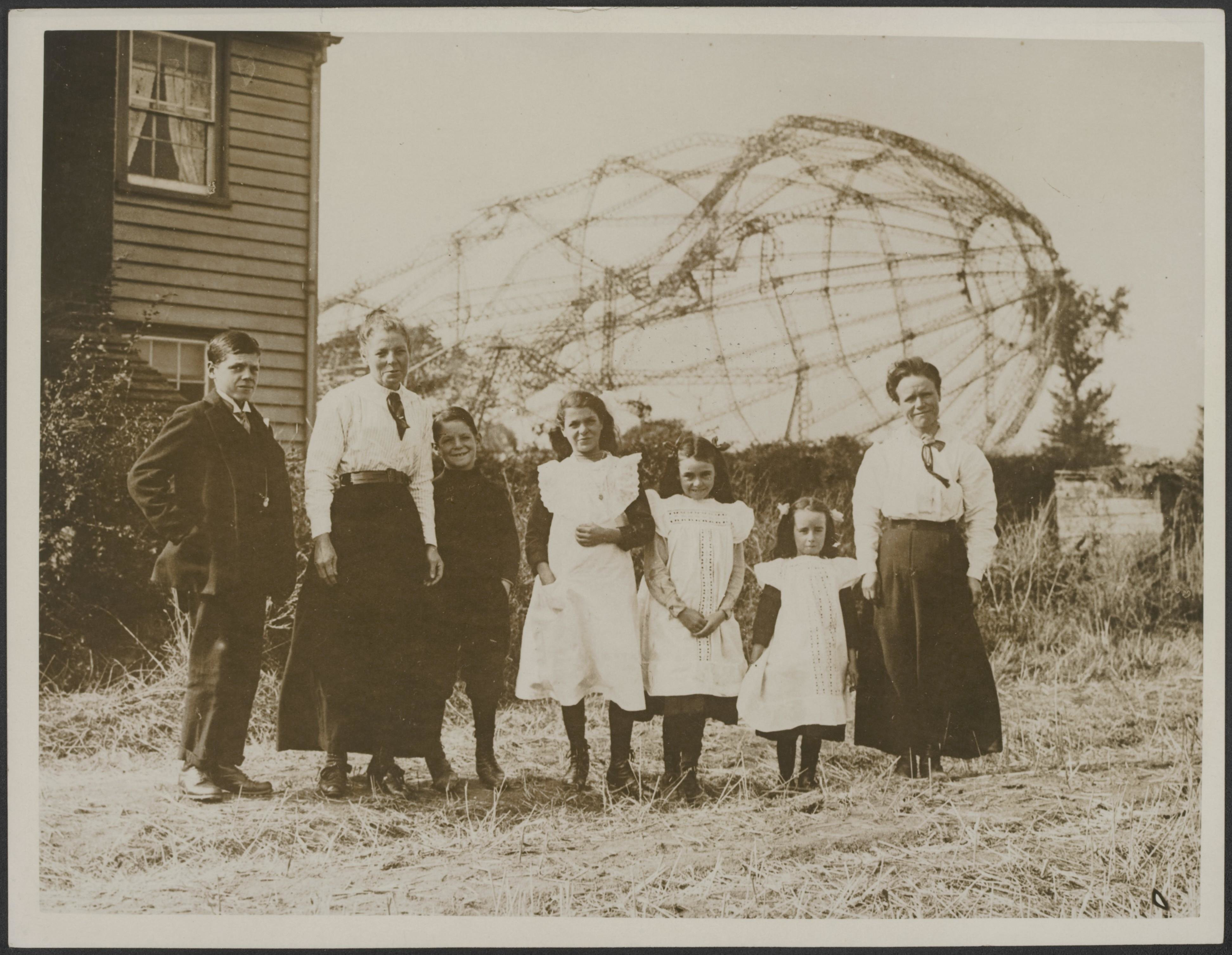
Family with the wreckage of a German Zeppelin LZ 76 in Essex (1916)

During the First World War, roughly 1,500 civilians were killed in German air raids on England and Scotland. Maggie Andrews, a cultural historian, argues that aerial bombing was a new form of warfare that frightened people and became part of collective memory in the areas affected. Contemporary newspapers described these attacks as "murder" directed against those who could not defend themselves. Many contemporaries believed that the death toll from similar raids in the next war would be large or that London would need to be evacuated. Aviation developed significantly during the interwar period. There was much public discussion of the dangers of aerial warfare, especially in the 1930s, when a new war was felt to be increasingly likely. For instance, Theodore Savage (1922) a dystopian novel by Cicely Hamilton depicts a war leading to societal collapse and a return to a tribal way of life. Government officials also feared that large numbers of bombs would quickly be dropped. The Committee of Imperial Defence calculated, in 1937, that 600,000 people could be killed and 1,200,000 injured within sixty days of such attacks. The government also expected that aerial bombing would lead to mass panic among civilians. A committee which investigated evacuation in 1931 commented that its responsibility was to prevent "a disorderly general flight" of civilians from London.

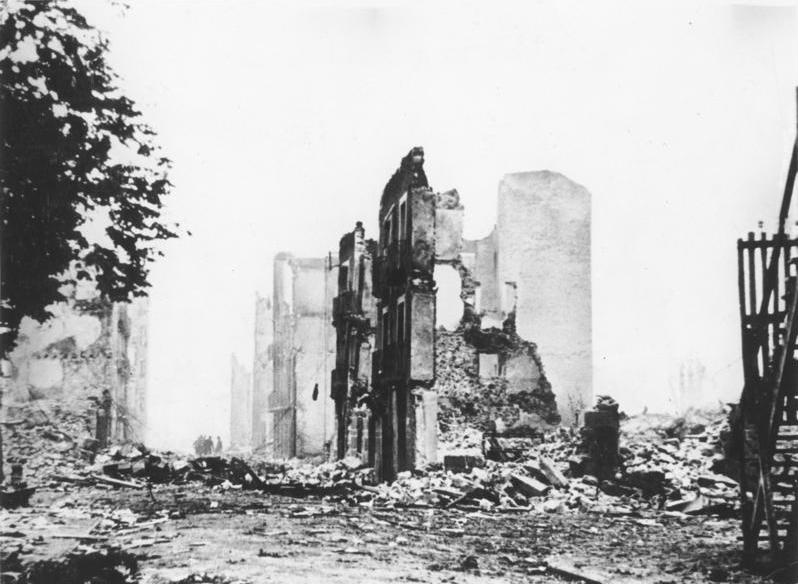
Aftermath of the bombing of Guernica during the Spanish Civil War (1937)

During the Spanish Civil War, German and Italian forces conducted a campaign of aerial bombing to assist the supporters of Francisco Franco. The newsreels about these events shown in British cinemas added to public anxiety about the prospect of air raids. An edition of the Picture Post from early 1939 included an image of bombed buildings in the centre of Barcelona with the caption; "Could this happen to Piccadilly Circus?" Brett Holman, a historian of aviation, comments that contemporaries tended to consider three strategies to respond to the threat posed by aerial bombing. One approach, favoured by the Royal Air Force and supporters of rearmament, was to resist the enemy by attacking its aircraft and bombing territories under its control. An alternative strategy was to minimise the damage bombing could cause through civil defence, evacuation and providing air raid shelters. Another option was for an international agreement to be reached to prohibit aerial bombing. There were some attempts to achieve this in the interwar period. For instance, Morgan Jones, the Member of Parliament (MP) for Caerphilly, lobbied the government about the issue in 1938. He argued that aerial bombing was an immoral attack on civilians and would worsen in the event of another World War but such efforts as his were unsuccessful.

== Government scheme ==
=== Planning ===
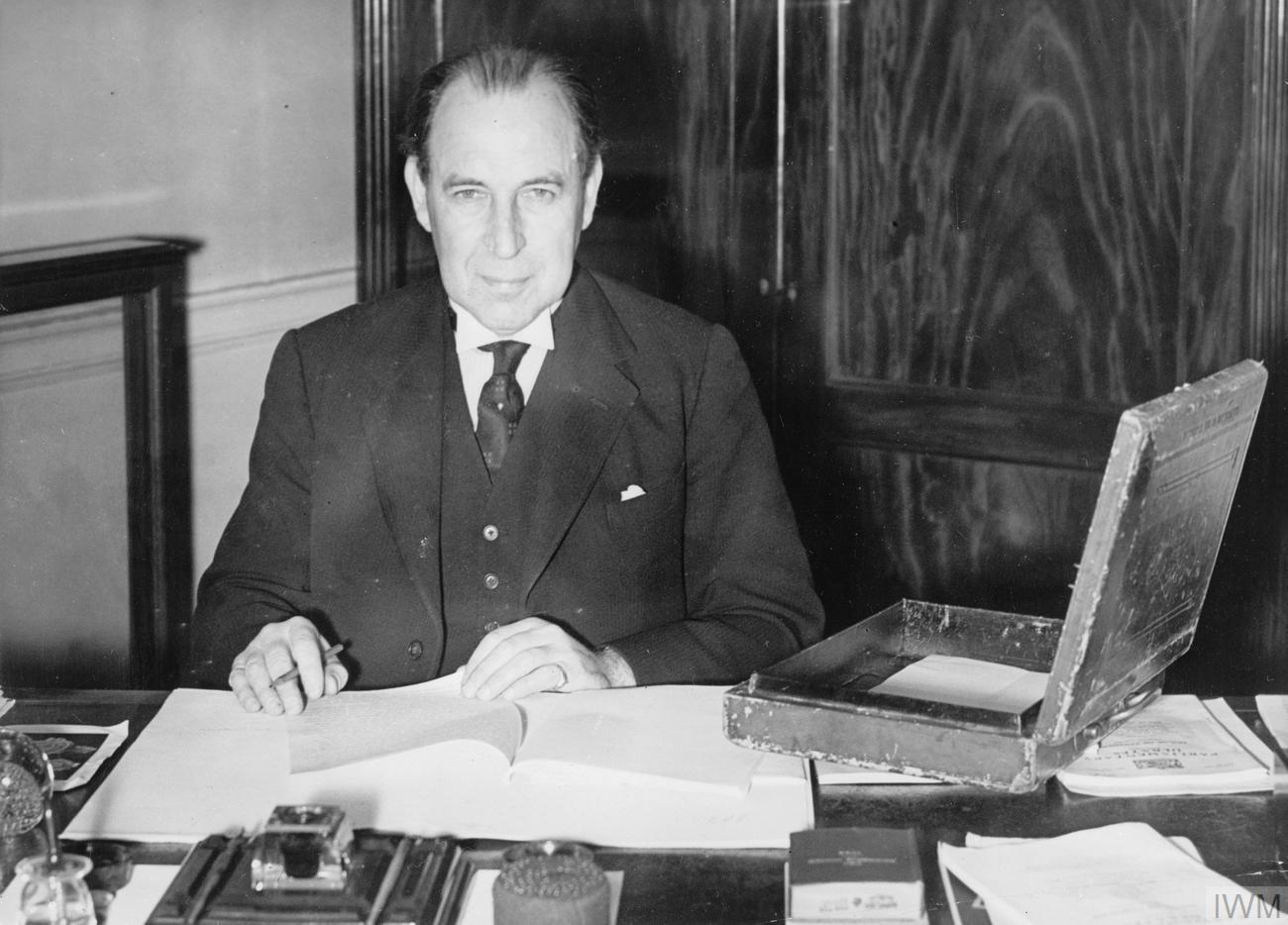
Sir John Anderson (c. 1939 – c. 1945)

The Air Raid Precaution (ARP) Committee was established in 1924. The ARP took the view that evacuation would need to be planned prior to the outbreak of war. By 1934, the Home Office believed that air raids would affect other cities as well as London. The government began to place more focus on preparing for air raids in the second half of the 1930s. An evacuation planning group led by Sir John Anderson was established within the Committee of Imperial Defence in 1938. Anderson's committee published a report in July of that year. The report argued that industries located in urban areas should be kept going in order to support the war effort, but that people who were not useful to those industries could be evacuated. Groups of schoolchildren would be evacuated in the care of their teachers. Evacuees would be accommodated in private homes and householders could be forced to offer accommodation. Evacuation would be paid for by the government but evacuees who could contribute financially would be expected to do so. Evacuation would be mostly voluntary with a few exceptions; for instance, people might be compelled to vacate an area for military reasons. These recommendations were accepted by the government.

The Ministry of Health decided that the groups who would be eligible for evacuation were: children under the age of fourteen, mothers of children under five, pregnant women and disabled people whose removal was considered practicable. Officials categorised localities as "danger", "neutral" and "reception" areas; evacuees would be removed from the danger areas and accommodated in the reception areas. The reasoning for these categorisations could be unclear and they sometimes caused controversy. For instance, a local official in Stone, Staffordshire felt that the decision to send evacuees to the area was unwise as it was in his view "fast becoming a vulnerable zone, as it is bounded on the north by potteries, aerodromes, aerodrome factories, on north-east by another aircraft factory, on the west by an ammunition depot, on the south by further aircraft factories, and also on the north-west in the centre of the district, it is proposed to erect a super power station". It had been assumed earlier in the 1930s that evacuation would not be necessary in Scotland, but in the later months of 1938 the Scottish Office began planning for evacuation to take place there. Scottish localities were grouped into the same three categories.

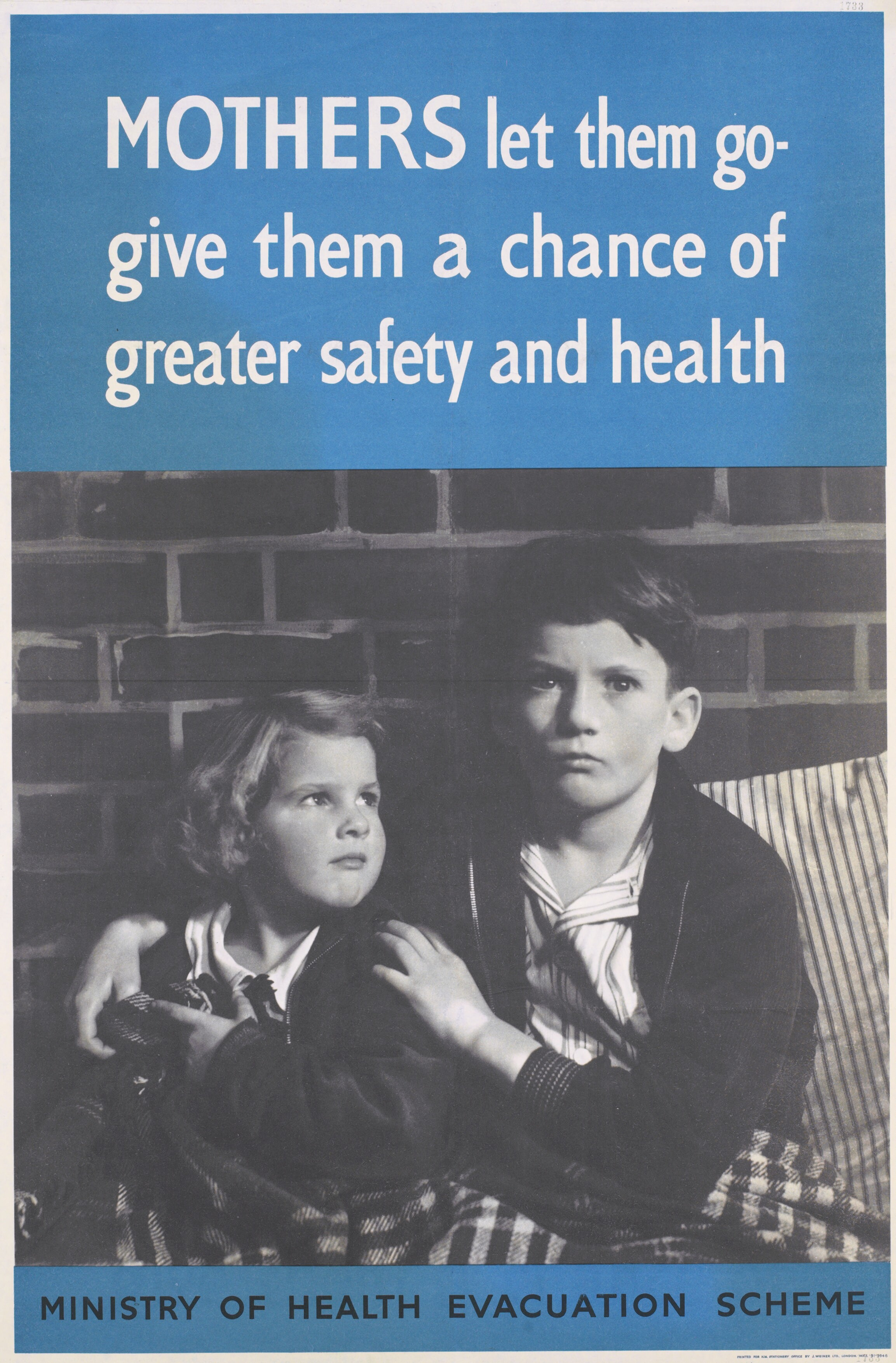
Poster by the Ministry of Health promoting evacuation

Anderson's committee requested a survey of housing in reception areas during January and February 1939, which was conducted by the Women's Voluntary Service (WVS). It was assumed that a residential building would be able to accommodate as many people as it had rooms, including rooms other than bedrooms. In Scotland, where there was a particular shortage of housing, the ratio for adults was the same as elsewhere but two to a room for children under fourteen. Homes that were considered to be of a poor quality (e.g. lacking tap-water) or too close to militarily important buildings were assumed to be unable to take evacuees. Some individuals were exempted due to their physical characteristics; for instance, elderly or sick people were sometimes considered unable to care for unaccompanied children. After these exclusions, the survey concluded that there was excess accommodation for 3.7 million people in reception areas of England and Wales; half a million more than the number the government expected to be evacuated. The survey did not make any judgements about whether the householders had personality traits necessary to look after children.

The German occupation of Czechoslovakia in March 1939 reinforced a feeling that war was inevitable. In May, parents who wanted their children evacuated were asked to register at their school; mothers of children under five were also eligible. Although a promotional campaign was conducted to convince families to participate, registration rates were relatively low. This surprised the government; which instructed local authorities to promote the scheme further in July, leading to an increase in registrations. The government decided that evacuation would be conducted shortly before the outbreak of war. It believed that starting too early would create a negative public reaction but that air raids would begin as soon as war began. Schools conducted practice attempts at evacuation during the summer of 1939, a boy in Portsmouth remembered:

... marching along the road in orderly fashion, singing 'Ten Green Bottles' and other songs, to board lines of buses which transported us to Clarence Pier at Southsea. There we dismounted and walked to the ferry terminal for the Isle of Wight ... No boats were waiting to receive us on the rehearsal day, so we did the whole thing in reverse and returned to school on a bus. Lessons on why we mustn't cry and how to wave goodbye — clean hanky please — were seriously taught to us. 'Think of it as going on holiday' must have been one of the first pieces of propaganda of the war ...

=== First wave ===
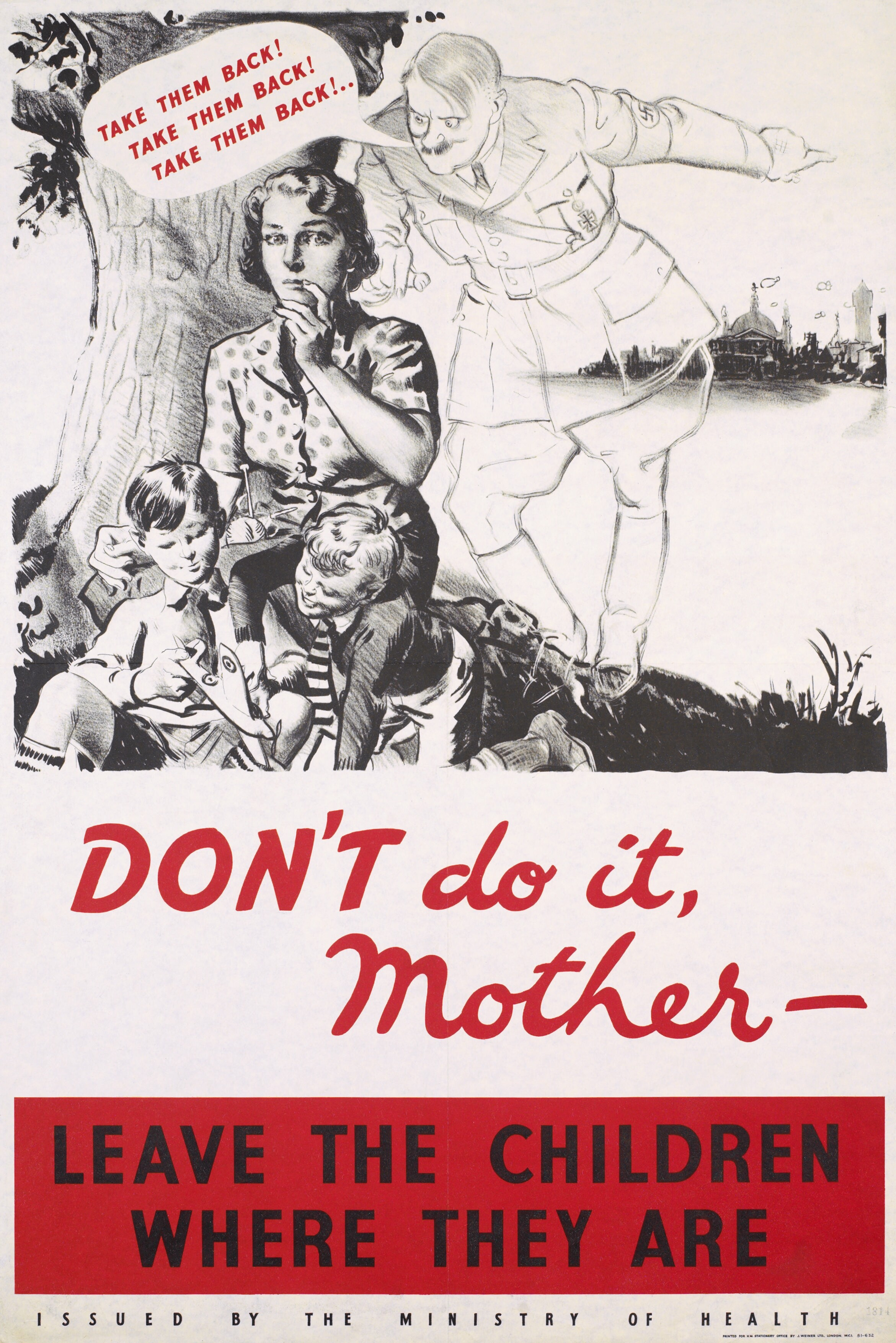
Poster issued by the Ministry of Health, discouraging removal of child evacuees

A diplomatic crisis developed in Europe during the later part of August 1939. A radio broadcast by the government on 24 August told teachers employed in London to cancel their holidays and return to schools. Germany invaded Poland on 1 September and the UK declared war on Germany on 3 September. Evacuation began on 1 September and continued for the next four days. Almost a million and a half people were removed from danger areas in England; including 826,950 unaccompanied children, 523,670 mothers together with their young children and 12,705 pregnant women. The process was sometimes chaotic with some reception areas receiving different numbers or types of evacuees than had been expected. For instance, Anglesey had expected 625 children but received 2,468. The numbers evacuated in Scotland are more unclear. A survey edited by William Boyd said that 175,812 people were evacuated there in September 1939; including 62,000 unaccompanied children and almost 100,000 mothers with their children. Richard Titmuss believed that about 46 per cent of eligible children in England and 38 per cent in Scotland were evacuated, participation was lower than the authorities had expected.

The early part of the conflict was referred to by contemporaries as the phoney war and no air raids took place on British territory. Mothers who had been evacuated often found the experience of rural life uncomfortable and impractical. Many men in their 20s and 30s had not yet been conscripted at the beginning of the war. Separation between couples due to evacuation caused additional practical and emotional problems; for instance, women did the housework in most marriages, which created a social pressure and sense of personal obligation for them to return home to assist their husbands. By February 1940, 87 per cent of women and 44 per cent of children who had been evacuated in September of the previous year had returned home. The return of evacuees was faster in Scotland than in England; the number still evacuated there was 27,000 in the summer of 1940.

Officials were worried about this exodus as they feared that evacuation would need to redone if air raids began. Additionally, many schools in danger areas were closed and their buildings being used for military purposes. Lady Simon, an educationalist, commented early in 1940 that there had been a "collapse of compulsory education" with the remaining children in evacuated areas allowed to "run wild" with little being done to resume their schooling. The government conducted an advertising campaign to encourage parents to keep their children evacuated.

=== Second wave ===
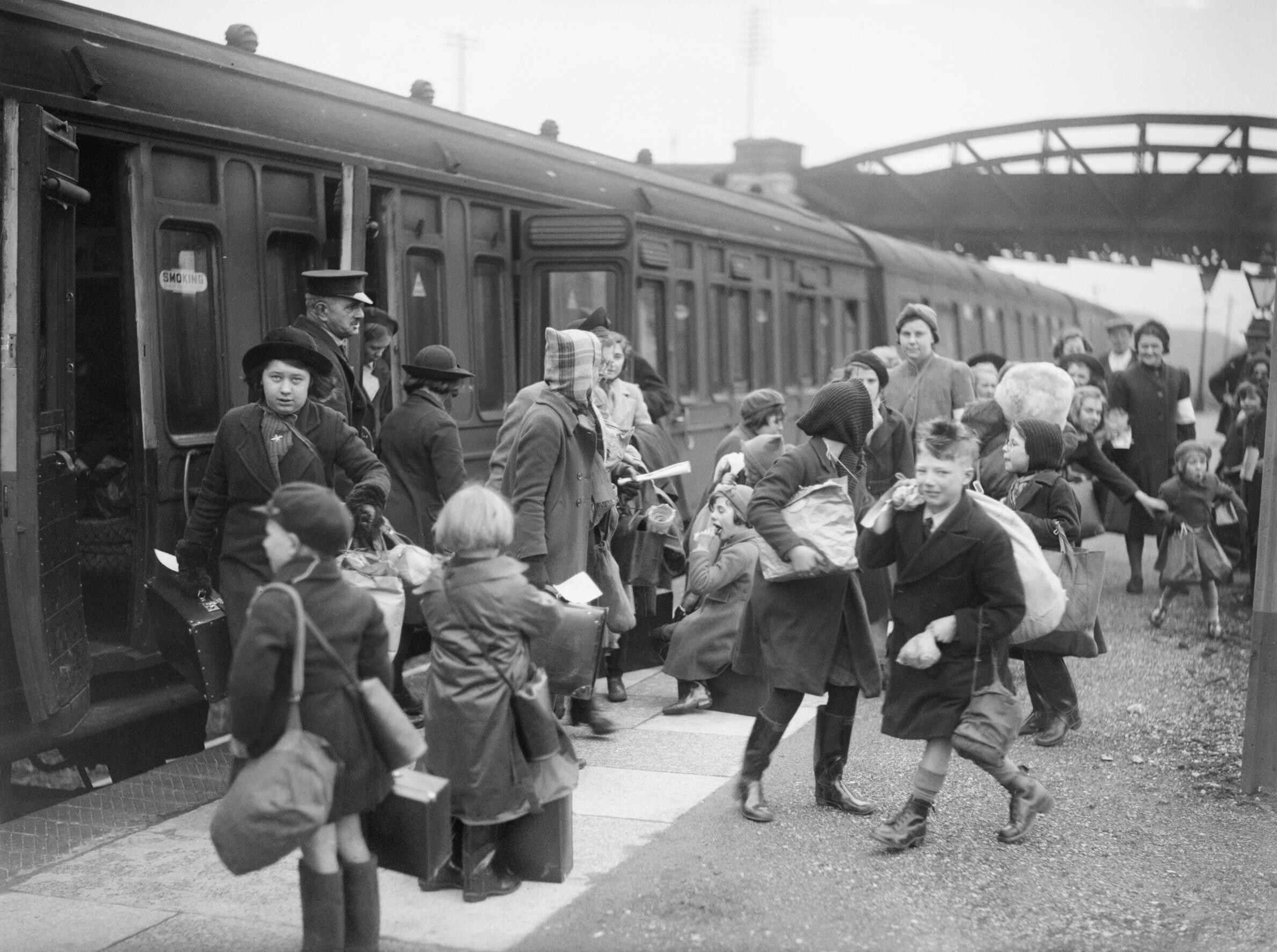
Evacuees arriving in Kingsbridge from Bristol (1940)

Germany conquered much of western continental Europe in May and June 1940. A fear developed that Britain would be invaded and anxiety about air raids intensified. A second wave of evacuation took place in England and Wales during 1940; 213,000 schoolchildren were relocated through the scheme that year. Mothers with young children were not included in the government evacuation scheme from spring 1940. Many parents were reluctant to have their children evacuated. Rumours were circulating about child evacuees being mistreated by foster families and that German paratroopers might land in rural areas. A feeling that it was pointless to try and escape the consequences of war also existed among certain parents; some felt it would be best for the whole family to die if one of them did. Many parts of the south and east coasts of England was reclassified as danger areas as they were expected to be the first battlefields of an invasion. Children were evacuated from those areas and evacuees who had been sent there previously were relocated. In September 1940, 1,300,000 people were evacuees under the government scheme.

German air raids on British territory began in 1940 and "the Blitz", a period of heavy bombing of various British cities, began in September of that year. This made some parents change their mind about keeping a child in an urban area; for instance, one girl remembered that she was quickly evacuated after a table she had been playing under was thrown over by the blast from a bomb explosion. The government evacuation scheme was re-extended to mothers in September 1940. The heavy air raids in Scotland during spring 1941 led to a second wave of evacuation there and by July the number of evacuees in Scotland had increased to 142,000.

=== Later war years ===
Air raids became more sporadic in 1942 and 1943. Many evacuees returned to danger areas in the Midlands and North of England. Evacuees in Scotland often also returned home, the number of evacuees there had fallen to 55,000 by September 1942. Officials were making preparations during spring 1944 to return evacuees to London but plans were delayed by the start of the V-1 attacks. The government arranged for the evacuation of 100,000 unaccompanied children from London in the summer of 1944. The evacuation scheme was formally ended on 7 September 1944, shortly before the V-2 attacks began, though the government advised against evacuees returning home. Newspaper reports expressed worries about the dangers of such returns.

The government declared the Scottish danger areas safe to return to in September 1944. Elsewhere, it continued to advise evacuees to stay in reception areas, until April 1945, though many were leaving. Local authorities were told to start the scheme to offer evacuees transportation home on 2 May 1945. Only around 50,000 evacuees returned home through this transportation. Many had already left and some stayed for longer.

== Experience of evacuees ==
=== Evacuation process ===
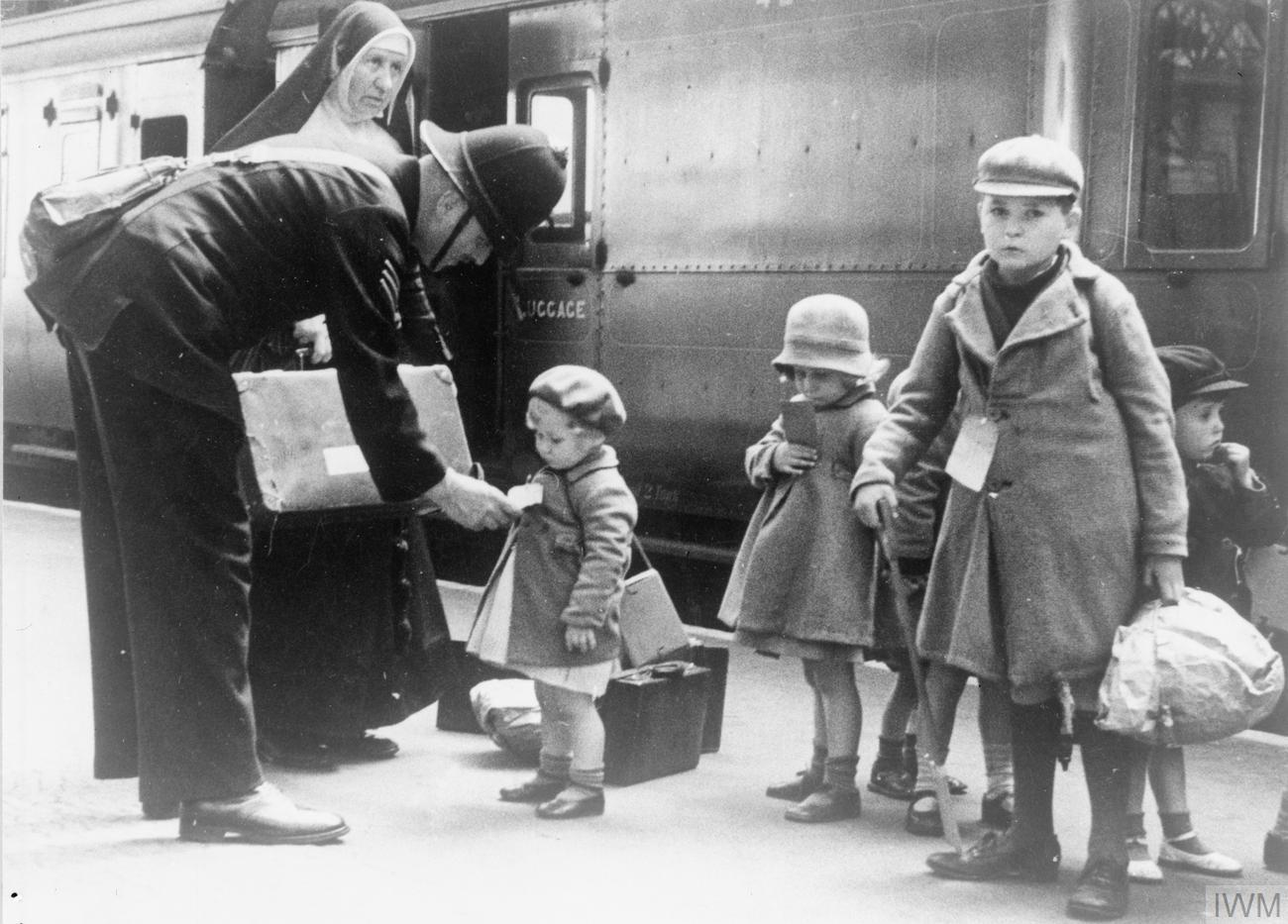
Evacuees preparing to leave London

In England and Wales the evacuation of unaccompanied children was organised through their schools. In Scotland children were evacuated through the nearest school in 1939; regardless of whether it was the one they attended. Some government officials believed that the Scottish arrangement made children more unsettled because they were separated from their usual teachers and classmates; others argued that it was suited to the Scottish school system. Later evacuation in Scotland was conducted in school groups like in England and Wales. Parents were expected to provide a variety of clothing and other possessions to unaccompanied children. This was difficult for some of them to afford; a mother in Liverpool cut up her only towel so that each of her six children could take a piece. Some parents used loans to equip their children and a teacher from an evacuated school, in an impoverished area, commented that almost all the evacuees she was responsible for had adequate provisions. Nevertheless, a widespread perception developed that evacuees were being sent without necessary belongings.

Many mothers became distressed when they were separated from their children. A boy who was evacuated at the age of seven recalled being confused by the unhappiness of his classmates' mothers as he saw the journey as an adventure. A description of a group of child evacuees leaving London in 1939 written by a participant in Mass-Observation commented that; "There is a strong contrast between the happiness and unworriedness of the children, their loud singing and whistling, and fear of the parents. It is the children and not the parents who keep the semi-normality of the atmosphere afloat, and absence of panic and scenes seems to be effortlessly produced by the children themselves." Other accounts refer to children becoming upset or asking not to be evacuated. Family members were frequently prohibited from seeing evacuees leave. Journeys were made by trains, buses and occasionally boats. Journeys could be long and uncomfortable but food and breaks were sometimes provided. A Scottish Office report on evacuation commented that "journey conditions" were often unpleasant; making evacuees tired and dirty. It argued that this situation contributed to many evacuees developing "an initial prejudice to the new environment" and quickly returning home.

Newly arrived evacuees were taken to reception centres in public buildings. Members of voluntary groups and individuals gave assistance to arriving evacuees; for instance, providing snacks. Certain reception centres attempted to clean evacuees; a group of girls arriving in Wales from Liverpool were forced to bathe in disinfectant, have their heads shaved and clothing burnt. It is unclear how common such practices were. Some accounts describe local people arriving to choose the evacuees they preferred; an evacuated girl interviewed by Mass-Observation felt the process was akin to a "cattle- or slave-market". Other evacuees were taken to the homes of their new foster families by billeting officers. Girls tended to be preferred over boys as it was expected they could help with household chores. Farmers preferred older boys to help with farm work. Younger boys and mothers evacuated with their children tended to be less favoured. A popular anecdote circulated which reflected many people's prejudices; it described a household who agreed to take in five girls. They were later told that the children would be boys which they more reluctantly agreed to. The evacuees they received were black boys, the racist implication of the story being that they were tricked into taking a less desirable group of evacuees.

=== Evacuees in private households ===
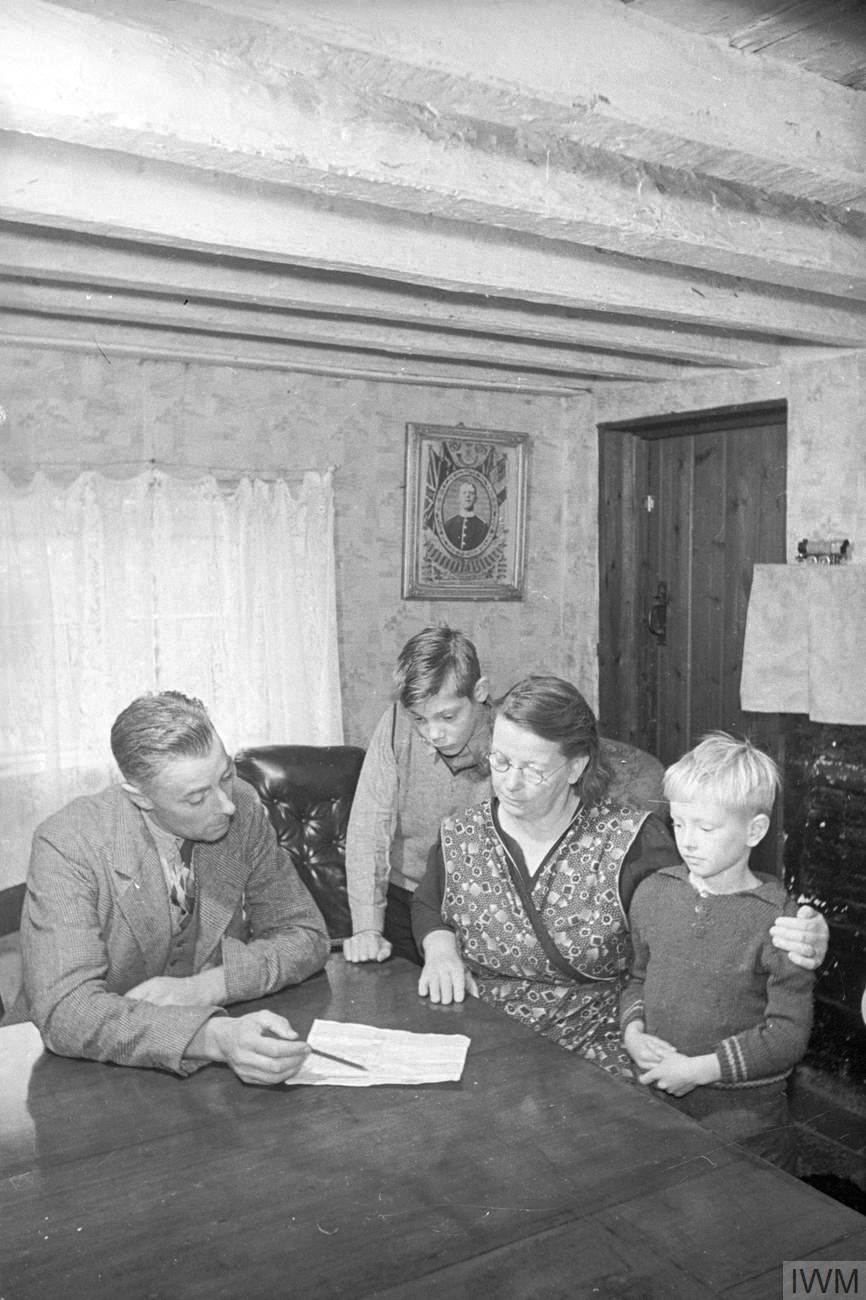
Foster mother receives advice from a billeting officer in her home in Kingston Blount, Oxfordshire (1941)

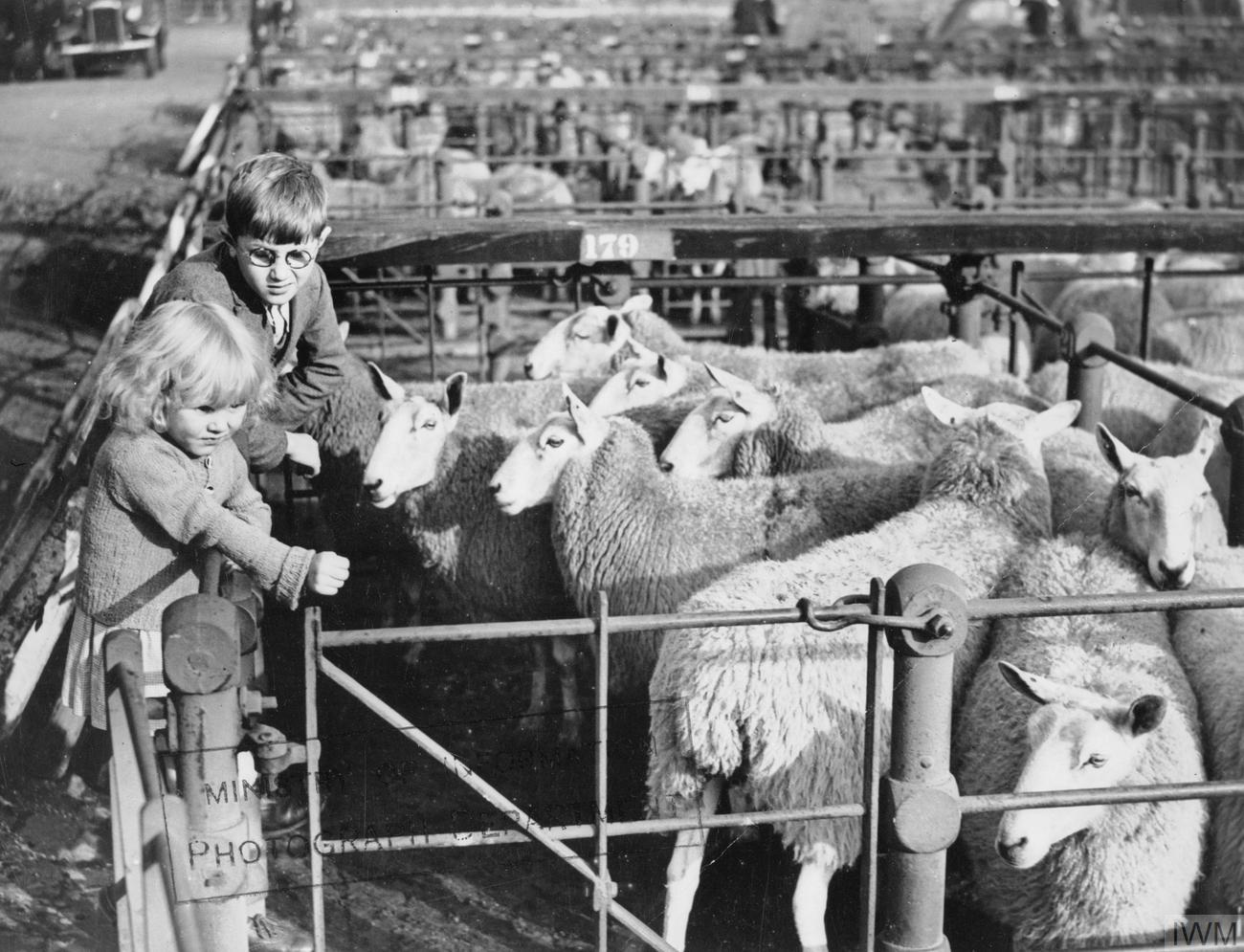
Evacuees from London at Market Harborough, Leicestershire on market day

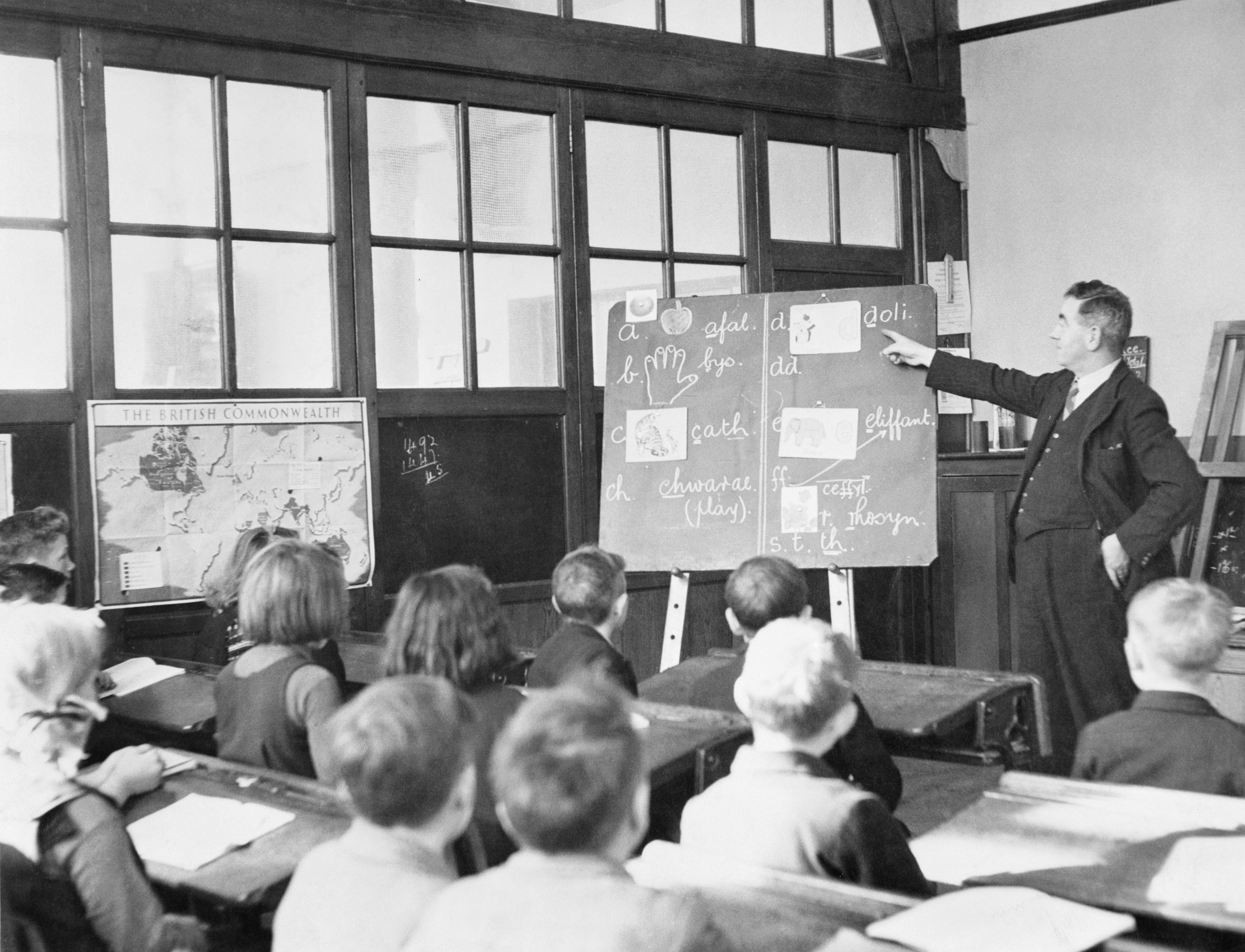
Evacuees from London learning Welsh in school at an unspecified location in Wales

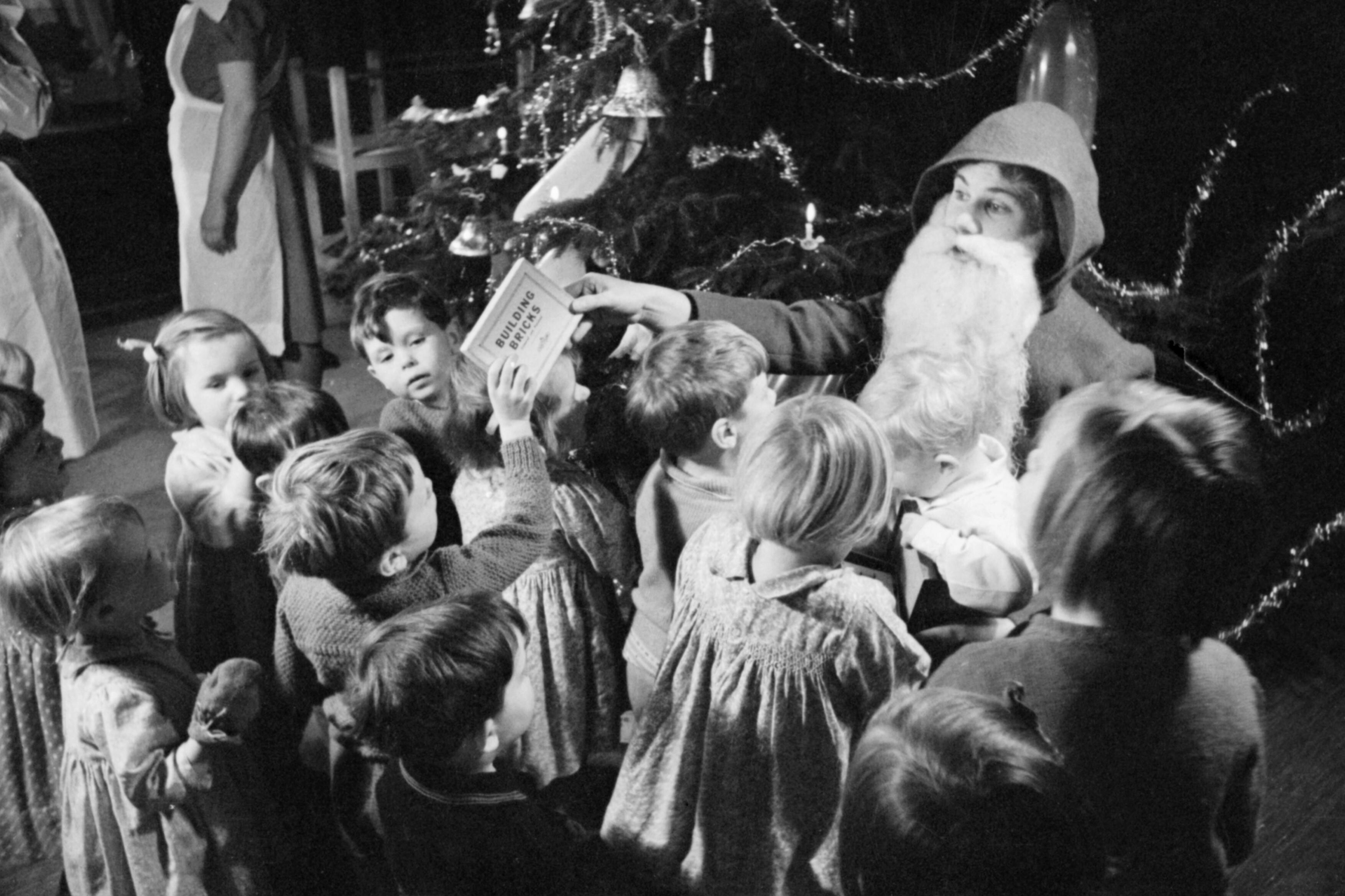
Christmas party for evacuees in Henley-on-Thames, Oxfordshire; photographed by Richard Stone (1941)

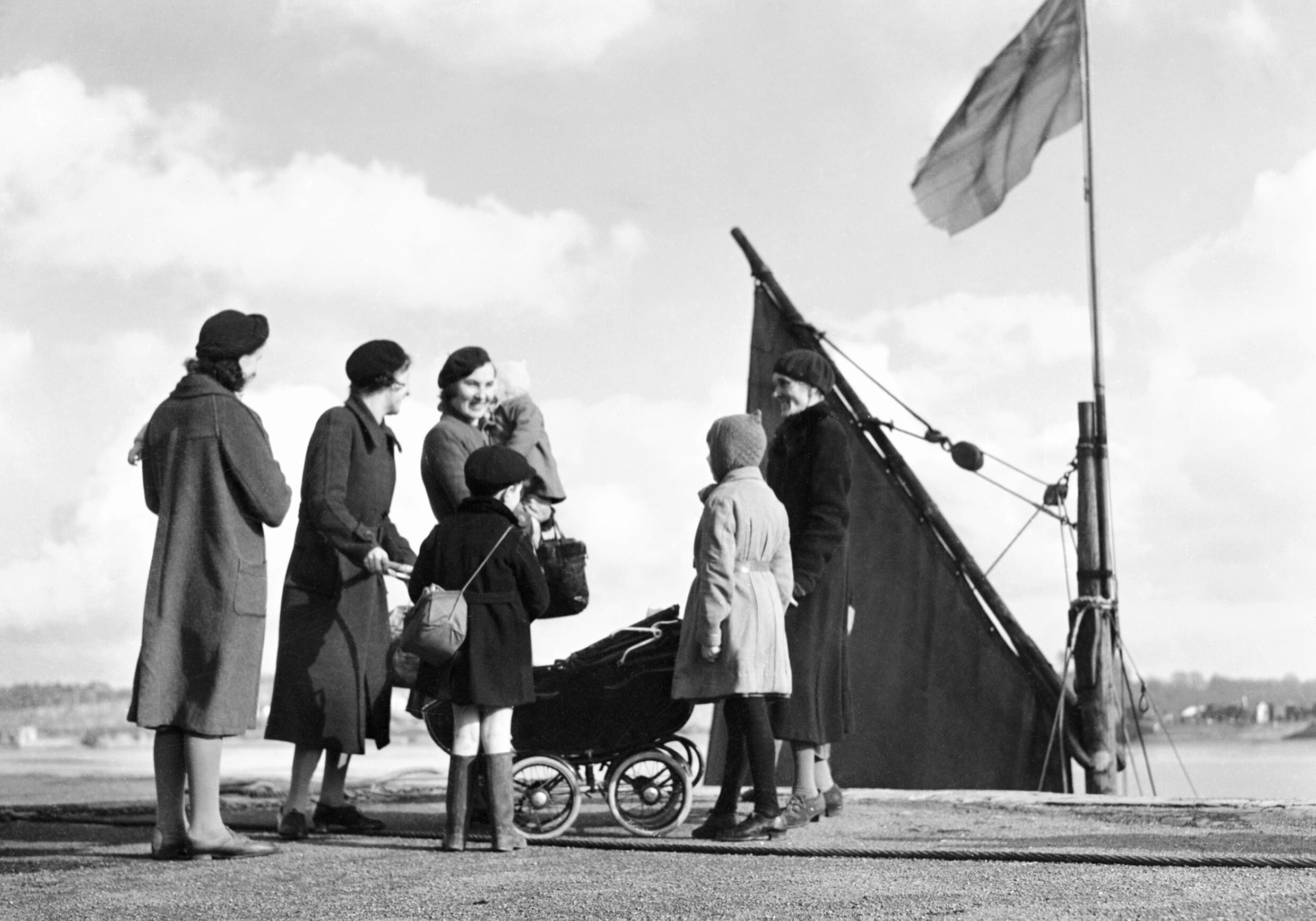
Group of evacuated mothers' and children in Bideford harbour, Devon (1941)

Some evacuees felt that the facilities in the homes they were sent to were primitive; for instance a boy sent to Cornwall remembered that his foster parents' house "...had no gas, electricity or running water, we collected water from a well and used a bucket for a toilet. It was normal to them but very strange to me!" These homes were often crowded and evacuees sometimes slept in makeshift or shared beds. Many child evacuees were warmly welcomed and affectionately cared for by their foster families. Often children formed emotional bonds with their foster parents but homesickness sometimes prevented this. An evacuated girl recalled about her foster parents; "Oh I loved them both, they were both really good to me, they bought me clothes from head to foot ... and everywhere they went I went with them." Sometimes foster parents were of a different social class; a Mass-Observation participant, who felt this should have been avoided, commented that "Quite 'nice' children are sent to cottages' and those from the East End [London] bathe in the swimming pool, and are driven around in the car." There were sometimes tensions about issues such as evacuees table manners and the long term effects being brought up in a home of a different social background might have on children; with worries being expressed from both a middle class and working class perspective.

Many evacuees were sent to the countryside. Aspects of rural life could seem strange to evacuees from urban areas. Fresh food, for instance milk from a cow, could seem unhygienic and odd to those who were used to buying pre-processed food. Evacuees sometimes resented the lack of designated leisure facilities, such as parks and swimming pools. Evacuated mothers feared that the countryside would be hazardous for their children. Other evacuees were sent to industrial towns. They were sometimes close enough to cities that they could see when they were bombed and hear the planes attacking them. Evacuees had to adjust to new dialects and accents which could be hard to understand and make them stand out. For English evacuees sent to Wales, or even those evacuated within Wales, their new environment could feel especially exotic. An English girl remembered wondering if the Welsh would use a different currency and an evacuee from Swansea saw northern Pembrokeshire as "a world of woods and cwms, green fields and dingles, and strange, dark men speaking Welsh." Some foster parents were Welsh-speakers who knew little English. Child evacuees in the most Welsh-speaking areas often learnt the language, evacuation to places that had been bilingual before the war tended to lead to the local children speaking more English.

Evacuated schools were accommodated within the existing schools in reception areas. Often a "double shift" system was used where the local children and evacuees were taught in the classroom for half a day each. Each group spent the rest of the day doing activities outside; such as going for walks, playing sports and gardening. Being taught separately could lead to local children and evacuees keeping themselves apart outside of schools. Later in the war it was more common for schools to integrate the two groups which could lead to crowding; a school in Yoxall, Staffordshire accommodated a hundred evacuees from Birmingham in addition to less than ninety local pupils. Other buildings were sometimes used as makeshift schools; an evacuated boy recalled that his lessons were conducted in a shed behind a public house; "It had a corrugated iron roof, which meant that in heavy rain the teacher couldn't be heard. One side was open and chickens ran in and out. A few yards away was a pigsty ...". Teachers also had a degree of parental responsibility for evacuees; mediating disputes between parents and foster families, taking children to medical appointments or cleaning those who became unkempt.

Many individuals and companies gave charitable donations to assist evacuees. Workers at a fabric factory in Bury, Lancashire made mattresses for evacuees unpaid in their lunchbreaks. The WVS was increasingly involved in caring for evacuees as the war progressed; there were sometimes tensions with professionals who viewed volunteers as interfering amateurs. The WVS established clothing deposits to distribute charitable donations of clothing from the UK and abroad which had often been repaired by volunteers. Volunteers, including from the WVS and the Women's Institute, organised parties for evacuated children. They established various facilities for evacuees including children's clubs, women's groups, canteens and nurseries. Evacuees received charitable assistance from the United States and Canada. For instance, a local newspaper reported that evacuees in West Sussex received Christmas gifts from the American State of New Jersey.

Adult women evacuees were frequently unfavourably received by hosts. Women often found sharing living accommodation with strangers uncomfortable. A Mass-Observation participant in Norfolk commented that she had met adult evacuees who were missing meals in order to save for a train home. They found life in the countryside uninteresting and felt that air raid precautions in the reception areas were poor. Other accounts describe women feeling looked down on by local people or considering facilities in rural homes primitive. They could also be upset if their older children of school age had been evacuated elsewhere. The government gave evacuated mothers a weekly allowance of 5s (Note: equivalent to £12 in 2025) for themselves and 3s for each of their children. Money could be an issue for them, however, especially if the father of the family was a civilian and the couple thus needed to maintain two households. Adult evacuees were more likely to stay in the countryside for longer if the family was together and they found good accommodation. For instance, a mother and her children were evacuated from Glasgow in three groups. Her husband left Glasgow and rented part of a house in the countryside which they all moved into.

A small number of evacuees were killed in air raids or died in accidents. Urban children did not always understand the dangers of the countryside. The conditions of wartime; increased military traffic, discarded weaponry and minefields created additional risks. A minority of children were mistreated by their foster families; often neighbours or teachers intervened to help when such situations happened. Some girls recalled being sexually abused by their foster fathers. An academic study of a sample of former child evacuees, who had been sent from Kent to South Wales or South West England, commented that "a number of respondents had experienced some form of abuse, either physical, sexual, emotional, or labour exploitation."

=== Evacuees in institutions ===
The government felt that evacuating disabled children to private households would be too inconvenient for householders. Disability had a significant degree of social stigma in the early 20th century and these children typically attended segregated day or residential schools. Cecil Maudsley, an official at the Board of Education, commented that while "it might be argued in cold blood that perhaps these handicapped children are not so much worth saving as the able-bodied" public opinion would be upset if they were not protected. A trial evacuation took place of physically disabled children to St Mary's Bay Holiday Camp in Dymchurch, Kent in September 1938. The children were housed in unheated army barracks and looked after by British Red Cross nurses without relevant experience. The children were quickly sent home and the evacuations the following year were better planned. In September 1939, 3,200 children from day schools for the disabled in danger areas of England were evacuated in specialist groups; another 2,200 were deemed capable of being evacuated to private households like other schoolchildren. Julie Summers writes that, while the living conditions of children in the specialist groups were frequently uncomfortable, the experience of evacuation was generally less unsettling for them than for others; their accommodation was planned in advance and they remained with people they knew from school. The attitude of local people to the disabled children was generally friendly, one boy later recalled:

"When we left the camp we tended to do so in groups. I cannot recall any adverse reaction to us as evacuees, nor as cripples. You must bear in mind that because we were housed at the holiday camp we were not forced into people's private homes; and the locals were used to the camp being occupied by outsiders because that is its function. So there were no tensions arising from invading other people's territories."

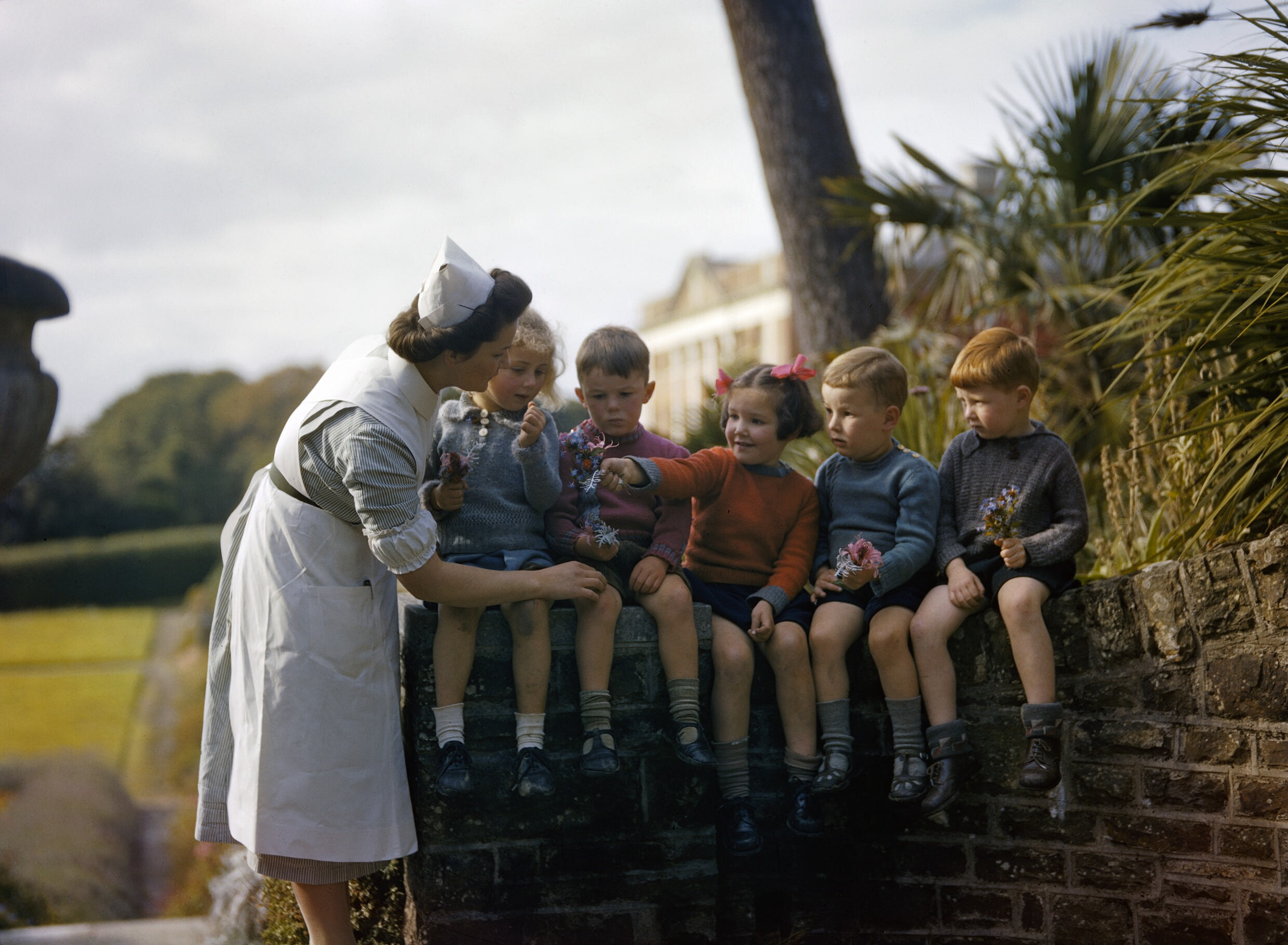
Child evacuees from Plymouth with a nurse at the Chaim Weizmann's Home in Tapley Park, Devon (1942)

Some nurseries' were also evacuated as groups. One girl fondly remembered the rural mansion in Shropshire her nursery was evacuated to. Anne Freud and Dorothy Burlingham ran a residential nursery for evacuees in New Barn, Essex. Four of the English public schools were evacuated; Westminster School relocated to Herefordshire, St Paul School to Berkshire, Malvern School moved into the premises of Harrow School and Cheltenham College into Shrewsbury School. Evacuation improved relations between rival schools as well as boys and their teachers. Other private schools operated in multiple buildings during the war years in order to accommodate pupils whose parents wanted them evacuated and those who did not. The pupil numbers at existing rural boarding schools also increased. Some advanced or specialist schools were relocated as a group, becoming boarding schools. Accommodation was found at country houses and holiday camps; options were sometimes limited and felt to be of a poor quality. Westcliff High School for Girls was evacuated to Chapel-en-le-Firth, Derbyshire. The girls lived in shared lodgings and attended school in another house in the village. Some advanced schools in Northern Ireland established branches for pupils whose parents wanted them evacuated.

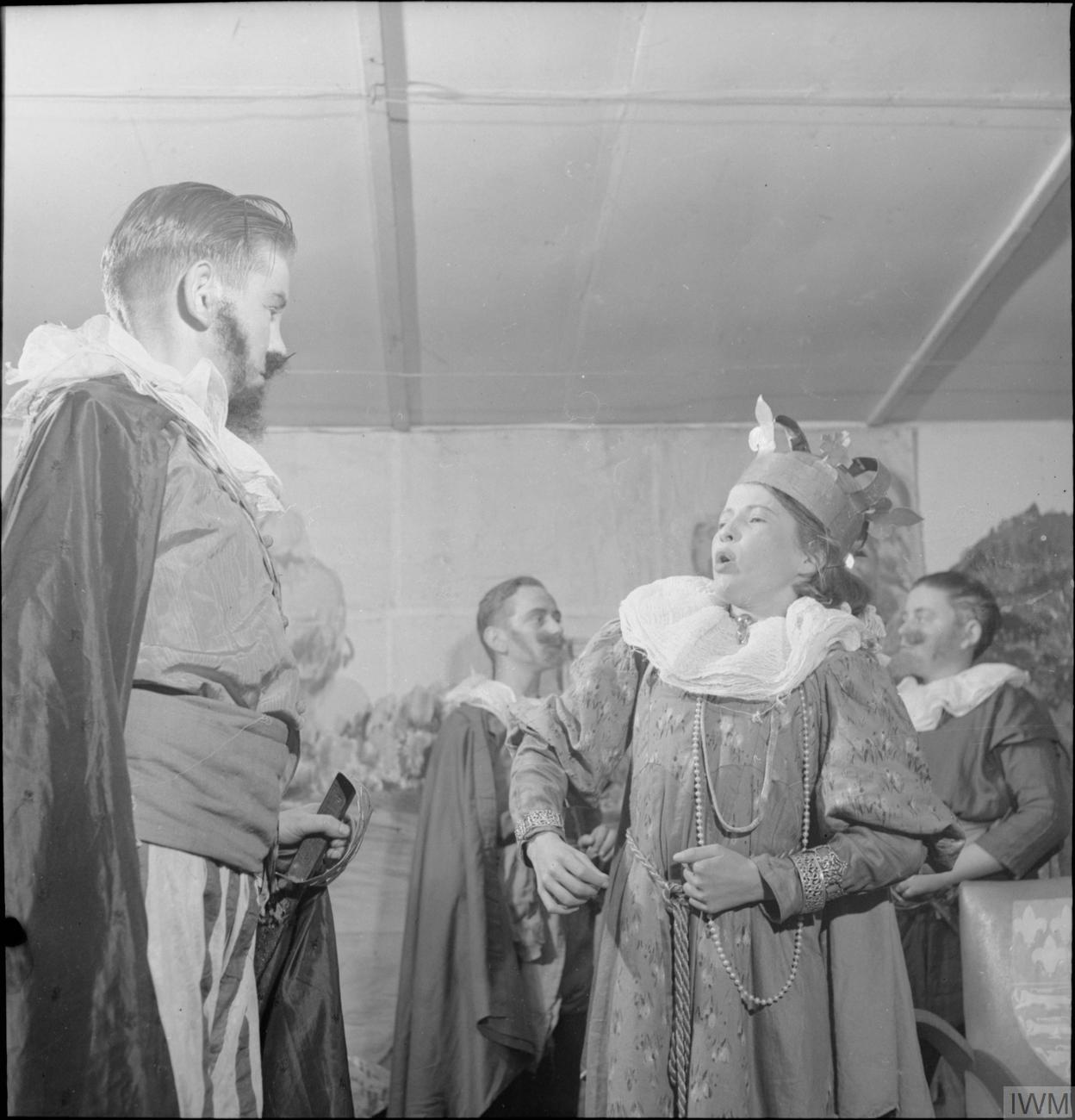
Children performing a play about Elizabethan England at Marchant's Hill Camp School, Surrey (1944)

Some commentators felt that group accommodation would be preferable to billeting in private households for all evacuees. This idea was rejected by the government as overly expensive and impractical. The government agreed to the construction of some camps which would accommodate a minority of evacuees, the National Camps Act 1939 arranged for holiday camps to be built for urban children in the countryside. They were built by the National Camps Corporation based on a design by Thomas Smith Tait. They were intended to be airy, so could be cold, but were well-furnished and usually clean. Teachers both taught and acted as parental figures. At Pipewood, a camp for adolescent girls in Staffordshire, teachers prepared Christmas stockings for girls and helped with problems related to menstruation. Children generally liked camp life; they enjoyed participating in practical activities, the clear routine gave them a sense of structure and they felt under less pressure to behave than when living in a stranger's home. Cottage homes aimed to give children a more homelike form of care in group accommodation. These institutions were smaller and the residents typically attended local schools. An example was Balendoch hostel, Perthshire, which accommodated children aged five to fifteen. The women who ran the institution enforced discipline but also acted as motherly figures for the children. A former resident of the home recalled:

It was a remarkable experience. Those three women – we called them our ladies – kept control of us, about 44 children in total, and they taught us everything. We learned how to share, they encouraged to think of others before ourselves. We learned to sing and dance, knit and sew, we learnt to have fun and we were loved ... Their Christian ethos was an inspiration, though we didn't appreciate it at the time.

Many additional hostels for evacuees were established during the winter between 1940 and 1941. They were often placed in ill-suited accommodation and lacked trained staff. The Ministry of Health pushed for the quality of hostels to be improved in 1942 and 1943; staff were trained and the variety of treatments was expanded. Group accommodation catered to evacuees' who were ill. For instance, Barrow Hall, Staffordshire accommodated about 30 children with scabies or impetigo in the care of nurses. In 1943, 3,000 evacuees in England and Wales were in group accommodation for children with behaviour or bedwetting problems. By 1944, 12 per cent of evacuees were living in camps, cottage homes, hostels or residential nurseries as the willingness of private households to accept evacuees had reduced.

=== Evacuation abroad ===
The idea of sending evacuees abroad was not part of the government's plans for evacuation in the 1930s. In 1939, some parts of the British Empire, including Canada and Southern Rhodesia, offered to take evacuees but the British government felt that such ideas were impractical. The German military successes in 1940 made the government more open to overseas evacuation. Winston Churchill, the Prime Minister, was against the idea feeling that it encouraged a "defeatist spirit". However, he was preoccupied with the war in France when the War Cabinet discussed the issue and the government agreed to plans for state-funded evacuation of unaccompanied children abroad in June 1940. The Children's Overseas Reception Board (CORB) was established that month to organise these plans.

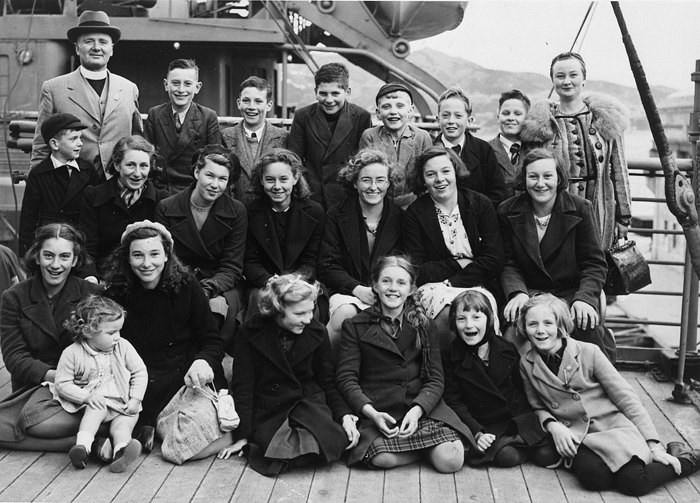
Group of children and escorts travelling to New Zealand through the CORB scheme (1940)

More than 211,000 children had been registered for the scheme ten days after its announcement. Parents enrolled their children in the scheme in order to protect them from the difficulties of life in wartime and the potential for a German invasion. Children and parents were not allowed to tell other people that they were participating. Families were obliged to leave their children at a railway station rather than accompanying them to the docks. On the journey, children were looked after by an escort in groups of around eight. Children were medically inspected before leaving and 11 per cent of participants were sent back due to having certain disabilities or health problems. In September and August 1940, 2,664 CORB evacuees boarded nineteen ships to Canada, Australia, New Zealand and South Africa. The scheme appealed to families from various social backgrounds. The government paid travel costs; parents were expected to pay 5s a week towards their children's upkeep which was sent to the foster families. The supervision of CORB children was controlled by the governments of the host countries; the system varied between the countries. No judgements were made about the suitability of foster families.

One of the ships, the SS Volendam, was torpedoed by a German U-boat but none of the CORB children were killed. On 17 September, the SS City of Benares was torpedoed and sank. Thirty of the 90 CORB children were killed by the explosion; others died waiting to be rescued. Only 13 of the CORB children on the boat survived the sinking. This group included two girls who spent nineteen hours holding on to an upturned lifeboat and six boys who were rescued after eight days in a lifeboat. The final ship carrying CORB children, the SS Rangitata, aborted its voyage shortly after departure due to the sinking. The disaster did not discourage families from evacuation abroad; the Daily Express reported on 24 September that "Not one cancellation of passage was made yesterday. Instead many parents ... [contacted CORB] to ask if, in the event of cancellations due to the tragedy, their children might be moved up on the waiting list, so they might sail sooner." Nevertheless, the government was worried about the number of British ships that were being lost and announced on 2 October that the scheme would be suspended for the winter. It was not resumed again.

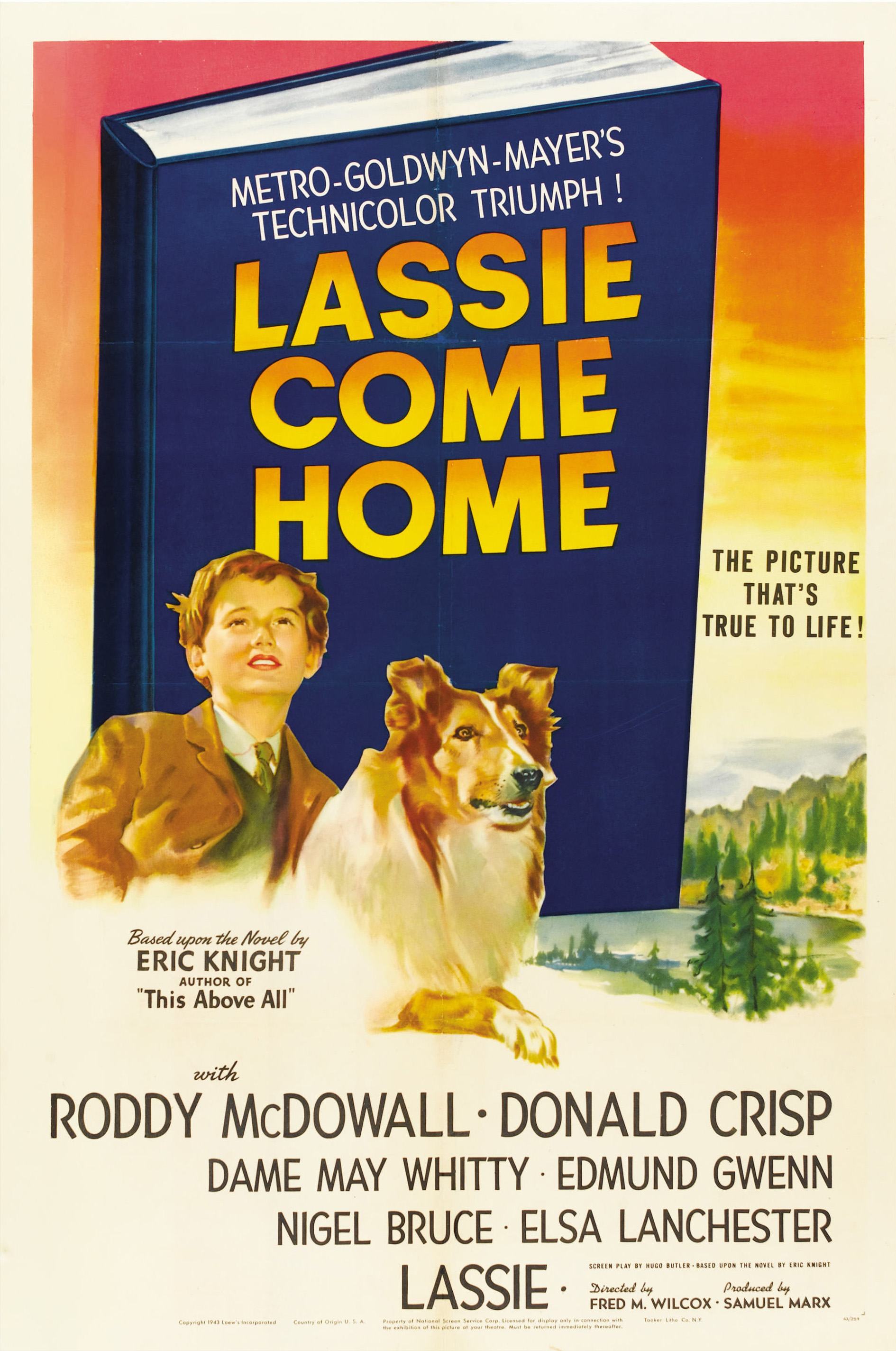
Advertisement for Lassie Come Home (1943) depicting its lead actor Roddy McDowall

A number of privately-organised schemes and agreements between individuals arranged for children to be evacuated to the British dominions or the United States. Summers estimates around 13,000 children were sent abroad through such arrangements. For instance, academics at Yale University fostered the children of academics and employees at Oxford University. Private evacuation tended to disproportionately benefit wealthier families which led to some resentment at the time. Some contemporaries felt that evacuation to the United States improved British-American relations. Jessica Mann, a later writer on the subject, commented that; "...evacuee children were used, both before and after they reached America, to win sympathy for their country's cause ... [Although] the evacuation scheme had not been designed as a propaganda exercise it was certainly used–and recognized–as such...". Programmes were broadcast on American radio which featured child evacuees speaking to their parents in the UK. A few of the child evacuees acted in American films; one example was Roddy McDowall, who played several sympathetic British boy characters.

In October 1940, the British and Irish governments negotiated a scheme for evacuees to travel from Britain to neutral Ireland. The scheme, which began at the start of 1941, was open to mothers with children from areas of Britain which were classified as danger areas in the evacuation categories. It was extended to those who were homeless due to air raids in March. The women had to find their own accommodation in Ireland but their travel costs were paid for and they were given a weekly allowance. This was 5s for the mother, 3s for children younger than fourteen and 5s for older teenagers who were in school.

== Informal evacuation ==
There was felt to be a considerable risk of war during the Munich Crisis in the autumn of 1938. Many Londoners left the city and more than 150,000 people were reported to have fled to Wales. In April 1939, stories appeared in the press that the government was planning to make receiving evacuees compulsory. Many households, especially wealthier people, arranged to take in private evacuees in the event of war in order to avoid having to accept evacuees from the government scheme. Sir George Chrystal, a senior civil servant, believed 800,000 places for evacuees had already been taken up by such arrangements in April. Education officials in Lanarkshire commented in October 1939 that local schools were teaching more unofficial child evacuees than children evacuated through the government scheme.

The Bank of England, departments of the British Broadcasting Corporation (BBC) and other organisations relocated from London to the countryside in the early months of the war. They were followed by employees and their families; a girl remembered her mother "standing on the doorstep and crying" when they had to relocate for her father's job. In June 1940, the government promised that mothers' travel and accommodation costs would be paid for by the state if they made their own arrangements for evacuation. Around 430,000 mothers participated in this scheme over the following months though some only went for short periods. Many men had been conscripted by this time, making evacuation a more practical option for their wives than it had been the previous autumn. The government subsidies allowed them to pay to stay at relatives' homes. There were often tensions between women and their hosts; a July 1940 Mass-Observation report argued that "most of the difficulties and failures [related to evacuation] have been due to the inability of adults to adapt themselves to new conditions, rather than children".

Once the Blitz began, many women and children fled bombed cities on their own initiative. Towns that were easy to reach on trains from cities often became crowded with unofficial evacuees. They were frequently viewed unsympathetically by local people who saw them as a drain on local resources. A Mass-Observation report from 1940 noted that prices for rented accommodation increased sharply with demand from evacuees. The lodgings offered to unofficial evacuees were often rudimentary, crowded and unhygienic. For instance, roughly 700 mothers and children were housed in a temporary shelter within a cinema in Oxford. During the V-2 raids, the government funded a similar evacuation scheme for mothers as in the summer of 1940; paying the travel costs of more than 500,000 mothers and young children leaving London. An article published in the Picture Post towards the end of war described the conditions a group of families from London were experiencing in Llanelli, Carmarthenshire:

Here, women with children live in communal houses taken over by the government and divided mostly into two-roomed units. I visited one house ... It was an ample 11 room house that once must have seen much good and gracious living. There was little that was gracious about it now ... Five mothers and 15 children were billeted here ... These wives of working men and servicemen were so utterly absorbed in the problems of keeping families fed and clean that there was a complete vacuum where, under easier conditions, there might have been those things that nourish the mind and spirit of family. There were no books of any description, no periodicals, no newspapers, not even a children's crayon book.

The lack or poor quality of accommodation available to mothers sometimes motivated them to quickly return home. Women with a civilian husband who had stayed at home were also fast to return. Other families, whose homes had been destroyed in air raids, settled more permanently in the countryside. For instance, a woman with four children was happy to rent a derelict cottage, although it was infested and lacked indoor plumbing. The family stayed there until they emigrated to Canada in 1958.

== Northern Ireland ==
Air raid precautions in Northern Ireland were the responsibility of its devolved government. Northern Ireland had been established as a partially self-governing territory within the United Kingdom in 1921. The focus of the authorities there during the interwar period was on domestic political problems and perceived threats to the territory's future. Preparations for the prospect of a war in Europe were limited in Northern Ireland in the late 1930s. Both British and Northern Ireland government officials were sceptical that the territory would experience aerial attacks given its location; although the British government's military advisors had said Belfast was at risk.

The Northern Ireland government planned for the evacuation of schoolchildren from Belfast in the summer of 1939 but only found accommodation for a small minority of children. It did not organise an evacuation after the outbreak of war. A government-organised evacuation of schools in Belfast took place in July and August 1940; about 2,700 out of 70,000 local schoolchildren were evacuated. Brian Barton suggests, in his history of Belfast during this period, that parents may have been sceptical that the city would suffer air raids, reluctant to be separated from their children and not used to the idea of travelling. Some of the evacuated children quickly returned home. The British government ran an equivalent scheme of state-funded private evacuation from Britain to Northern Ireland as to independent Ireland; 715 mothers and 1,447 children had been evacuated to Northern Ireland through the scheme by February 1941. The Northern Ireland authorities planned for a government evacuation scheme to begin soon after Easter 1941. It would have evacuated mothers with children, elderly people and those who were unwell or blind. The scheme was heavily advertised, to an audience of women in particular, but registration rates were low. After the air raids on Belfast shortly after Easter in 1941, the official evacuation was cancelled as rural areas were already receiving large numbers of informal evacuees.

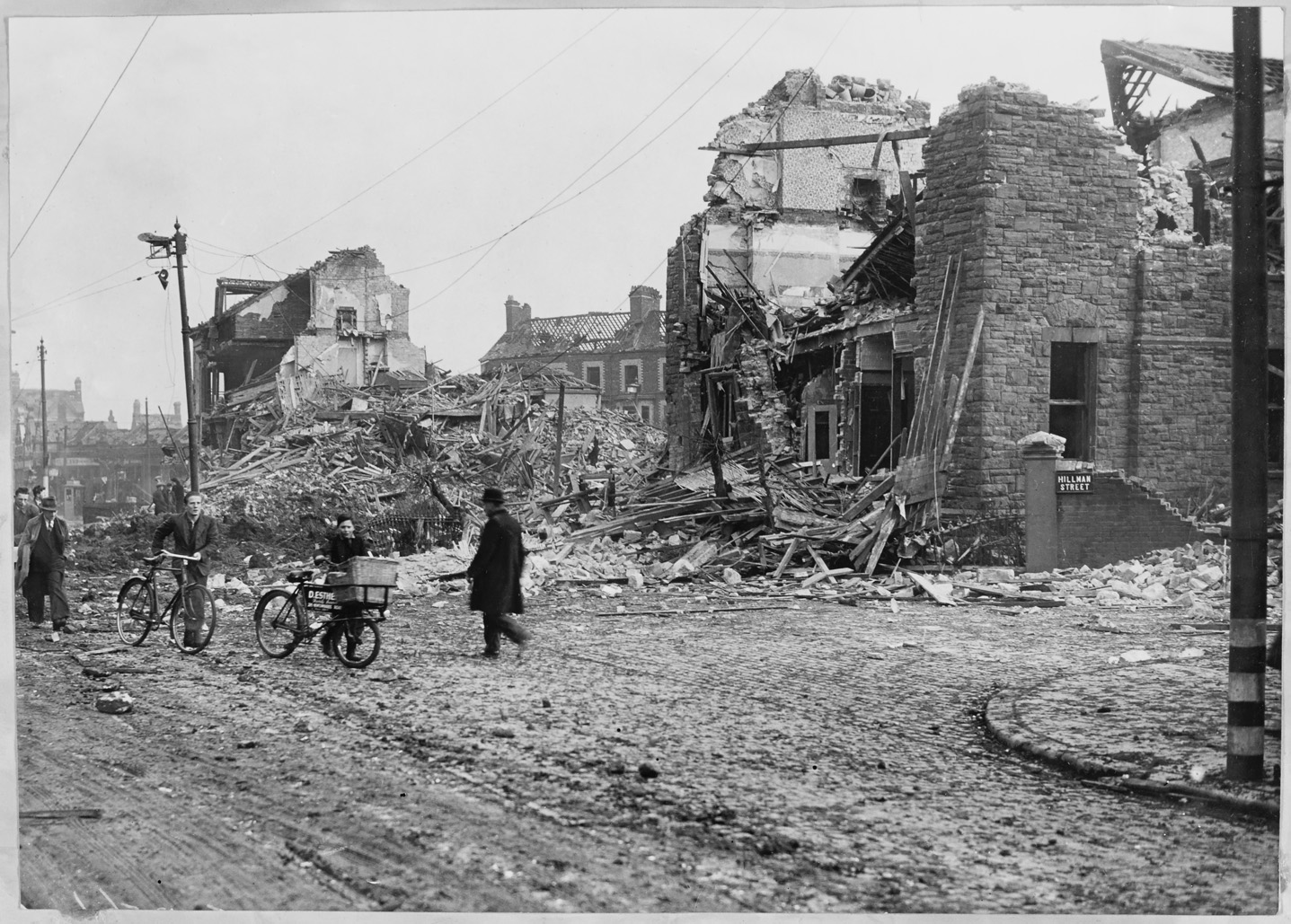
Belfast after an air-raid (1941)

Many civilians fled Belfast to the surrounding countryside during the air-raids on the city after Easter in 1941. For instance, an air raid warden described "... masses of people all on the move [in] … fear and panic … They moved along hurriedly … [with] parcels, cases, baskets, prams." The countryside around Belfast became crowded with evacuees and rents increased sharply. A WVS member described the arrival of unofficial evacuees in Lisburn near Belfast. She said that many of them were leaving due to fear even though their homes were not damaged. Temporary shelters were established for the evacuees in local schools until accommodation was found. Rural people were often surprised by the poverty of evacuees and saw some of them as behaving in an unhygienic manner. Some accounts describe instances of fraud; evacuees taking donations of clothing to sell. Another wave of unofficial evacuees left the city following air-raids on Belfast in May.

== Reactions ==
=== Parents ===
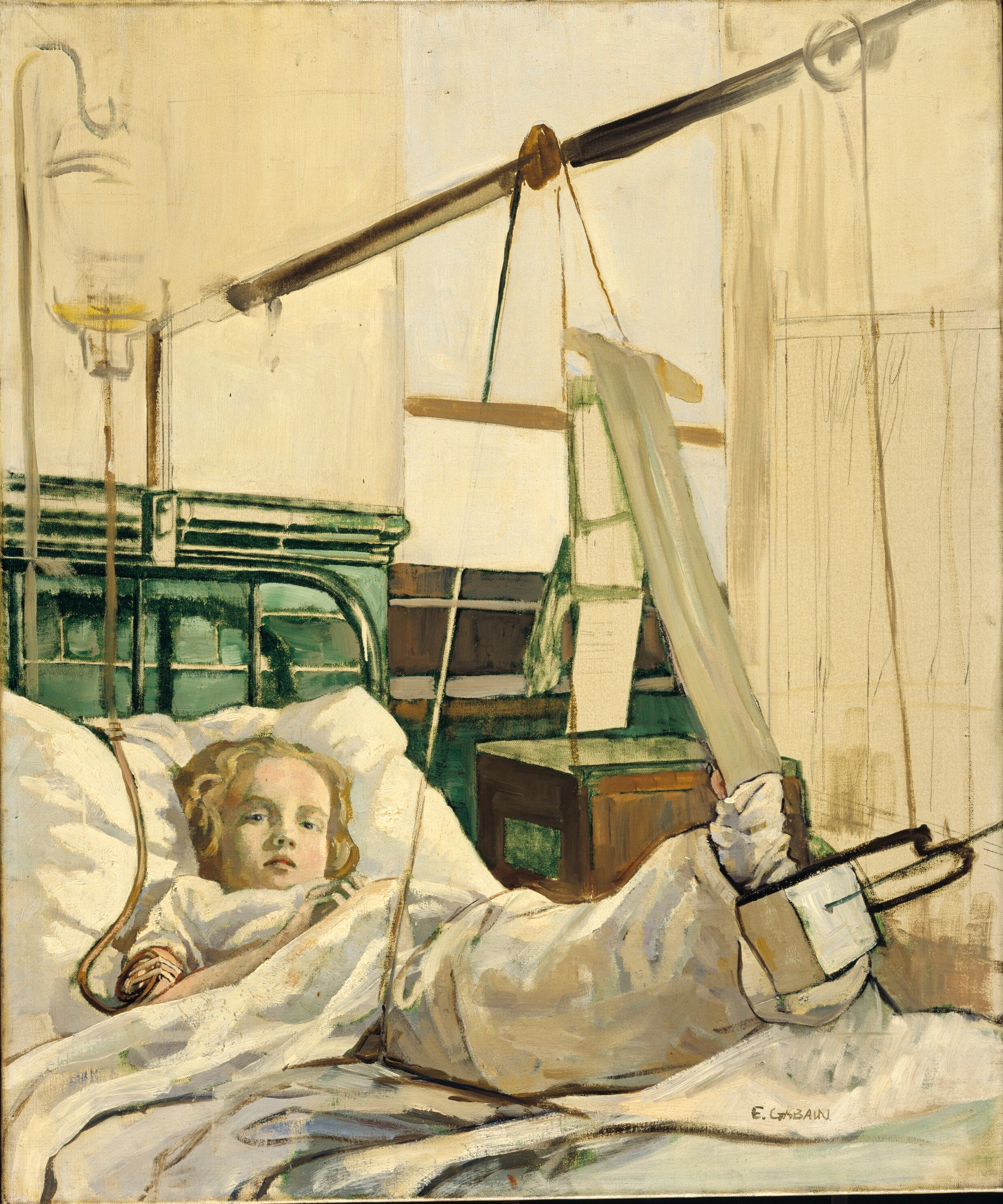
Illustration of a child receiving treatment for injuries sustained in an air-raid, by Ethel Léontine Gabain (1944)

The government and media told parents that they had a patriotic duty and obligation to their children to participate in evacuation. Mothers, in particular, were told that keeping children at home would be emotionally weak. A six-year-old girl who was evacuated to Staffordshire for a short period in 1939 remembered her mother later commenting "that they were brainwashed into believing that they were doing the wrong thing if they didn't let the children go". Although the public discussion about evacuation emphasised the role of mothers, in many households men held authority over women. Children frequently recalled that the decision for them to be evacuated was made solely by their father.

A leaflet distributed by the government in 1939 commented that "the main way to avert the enemy's intention of creating panic and social dislocation is by removing children from endangered areas." Parents of this period could typically remember the First World War, and fathers had often been soldiers in that conflict. Many were keen to protect their children from the suffering of warfare which they had experienced. One boy recalled that his father, who had been injured and exposed to poison gas during the previous conflict, became angry when his children brought home letters about evacuation remembering that the soldiers had believed they "were fighting the war to end all wars". He quickly decided they should be evacuated. A father whose daughters were evacuated abroad in 1940 wrote that he felt he had "committed a horrible crime" by sending them on a dangerous journey. Nevertheless, he considered this less cruel than "keeping them at home to be the possible victims of an invading army".

A survey conducted in Liverpool, early in the war, suggested that many mothers whose children had been evacuated without them were unhappy. Some accounts describe mothers being happy to send their children away, but stories of them being upset by the separation are significantly more common. A boy recalled a crying mother coming into his evacuation train, to remove her daughter immediately before departure. Andrews suggests that psychologists took more interest in the effect of maternal separation than paternal separation because they assumed that mothers would be children's main carers. A large number of men were not in military service during the Second World War. Most people who were evacuated as children recalled the experience from their own point-of-view or that of their mother. Nevertheless, diaries and letters from the time indicate that many fathers were worried about the safety of their wives and children; especially those whose family were living in cities.

Children were given a postcard to send home with their new address and a message for their parents. Often evacuated children had contact with home through letters and visits; some received no visits as their relatives could not afford travel costs. Parents worried that their children would be mistreated but were also nervous that foster families might usurp the parental role. They tended to become upset if their children were referring to foster parents as "mum" and "dad"; it was more common for "auntie" and "uncle" to be used, terms often used by children in this period to refer to adult friends of the family.

=== Foster families ===
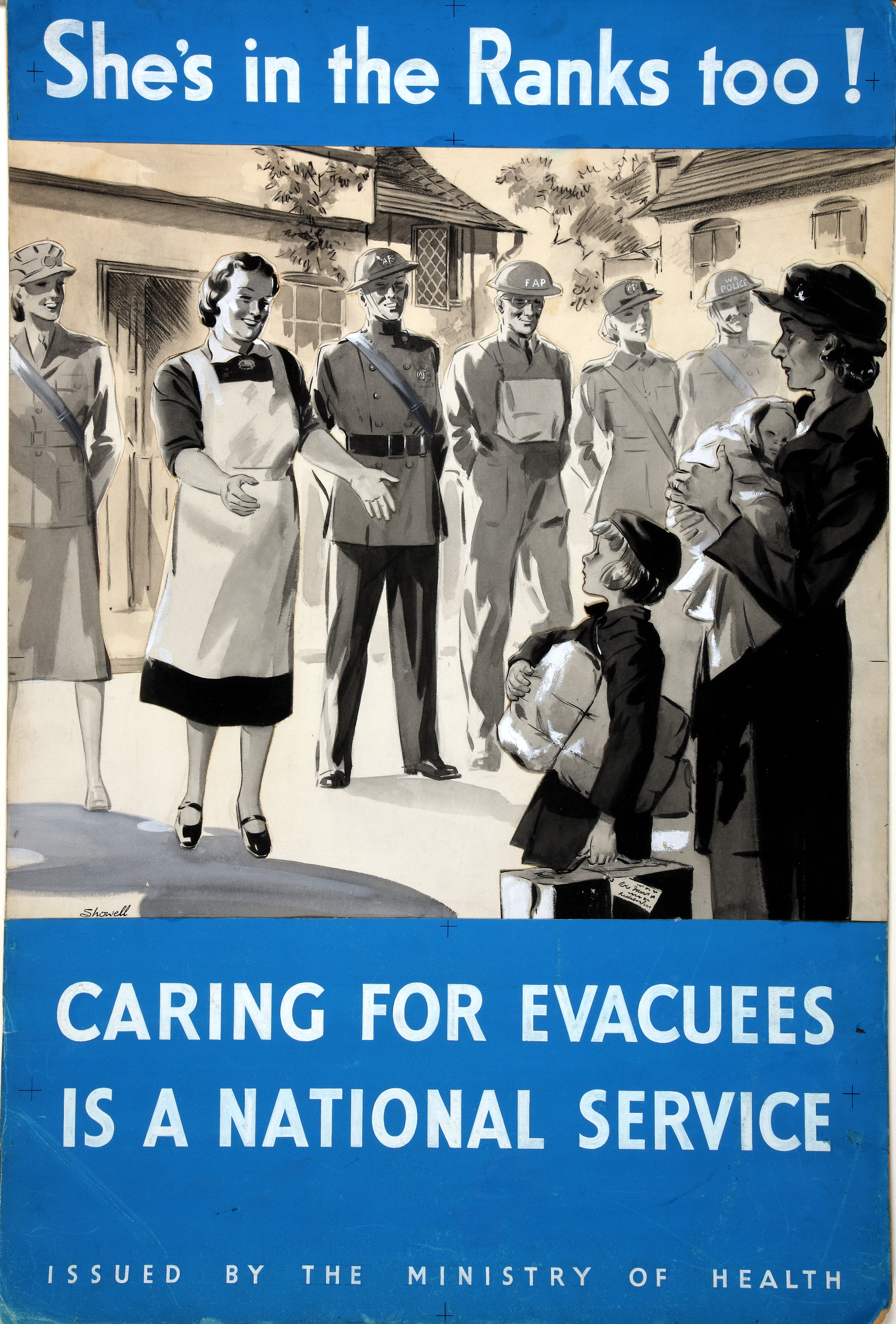
Poster by the Ministry of Health celebrating foster mothers

Households that hosted evacuees were paid 10s 6d (Note: equivalent to £26 in 2025) a week for one unaccompanied child and 8s 6d for each additional child. As well as the financial incentive, many foster mothers saw looking after evacuees as a way of assisting the war effort. The government encouraged that view and foster mothers were exempted from the compulsory employment other women had to participate in after 1941. Others saw looking after evacuees as a form of philanthropy or enjoyed caring for children. Some devoted significant effort to caring for evacuees. A billeting officer in Hampshire noted that a local woman had taken five child evacuees into her "tiny cottage" and managed them through "fairness, firmness and well-directed activity".

Other foster families had difficulties caring for their evacuees; for instance, a woman in Brighton who was looking after 15 evacuees was brought before a magistrate in November 1939 for violating the blackout restrictions. She was struggling to afford the boys' upkeep or control their behaviour. Evacuees created additional household chores, financial costs and sometimes damaged their hosts' property. Foster families were sometimes resentful when children were moved to a different billet or taken home at short notice. Others were unhappy about the presence of evacuees in their homes and glad when they were gone.

Research by the University of Liverpool published in 1940 found that 86 per cent of hosts had no problems with their evacuees and 7 per cent had problems that were easy to resolve. The vast majority of the 320 child evacuees investigated by the Cambridge Evacuation Survey (1941) had a good relationship with their foster mother. A teacher who accompanied the evacuation of their school, told the Cambridge Evacuation Survey that; "I recall with pride the good impression created by our youngsters ... Wherever I have been I have been received with kindness in the foster homes, and many have sought me out to say pleasant things about our children."

A Mass-Observation participant commented that about a quarter of people in their locality did not want to take evacuees; the billeting officers had the legal right to force them but were reluctant to do so as it would make life unpleasant for the evacuees. Although some households were forced to take evacuees. The willingness of households to accept evacuees decreased as the war years progressed. Andrews suggests that the number of prosecutions for refusing to take evacuees appears to have increased over time. In 1944, a woman in Staffordshire was fined for refusing to take evacuees into her home on health grounds. A widespread perception developed that it was easier for wealthier people to avoid taking evacuees.

=== Public attitudes ===
The public reaction to the first wave of evacuation was often negative. Critical rumours circulated about the behaviours of evacuees; local people complained to the authorities and threatened evacuees in the streets. The stories that circulated were usually told in the third person rather than by the hosts that had allegedly experienced them and often had reoccurring themes. They often portrayed evacuees as unhygienic and adult evacuees or the parents of unaccompanied child evacuees as ungrateful. An anecdote circulated in Stirling that a girl evacuated from Glasgow was so dirty her foster mother had to burn her clothes and shave all the hair from her body. Elsewhere, a participant in Mass-Observation described gossip that four mothers with babies were billeted with the same host. The women reportedly went out one evening telling their host to look after their children as the government was paying them to do so. Other more light-hearted stories also circulated which emphasised evacuees perceived naivety; for instance, a child evacuee was said to have commented on a walk with the adults looking after him "Eh, Mister, what a lot of blue sky you have up here."

A common problem was that child evacuees were often prone to wetting the bed. Many people felt this was an indication that they had not been taught the value of personal hygiene at home. Evacuees sometimes had headlice and there were anxieties about them spreading other diseases. For instance, an individual who said they were a billeting officer wrote a letter to The Spectator stating that an evacuated child had both scabies and "venereal disease". Andrews argues that the language used about evacuees at the start of the Second World War was similar to racism that became common in the 1960s and 1970s. An anonymous letter to the Picture Post in October 1939 commented that the writer's friends who were farmers "had seven lousy Birmingham brats [derogatory term for a child] parked on them ... they found the little brats had cut the heads of 13 turkeys for fun! ... I'd rather have a savage from Fiji than a child from Birmingham."

Research by Mass-Observation indicated that public attitudes towards the evacuees became much more sympathetic once air raids began in 1940; an article in the New Statesman and Nation based on Mass-Observation notes commented that "There was real sympathy on the part of the country people, who felt that the cities had been through it ... The exaggerated stories of filthy evacuee behaviour ... were now conspicuous mainly by their absence." A survey by Mass-Observation found that the general public considered evacuation the sixth most difficult aspect of the war in the first year of the conflict but it became less of an issue in later years.

=== Contemporary media portrayals ===
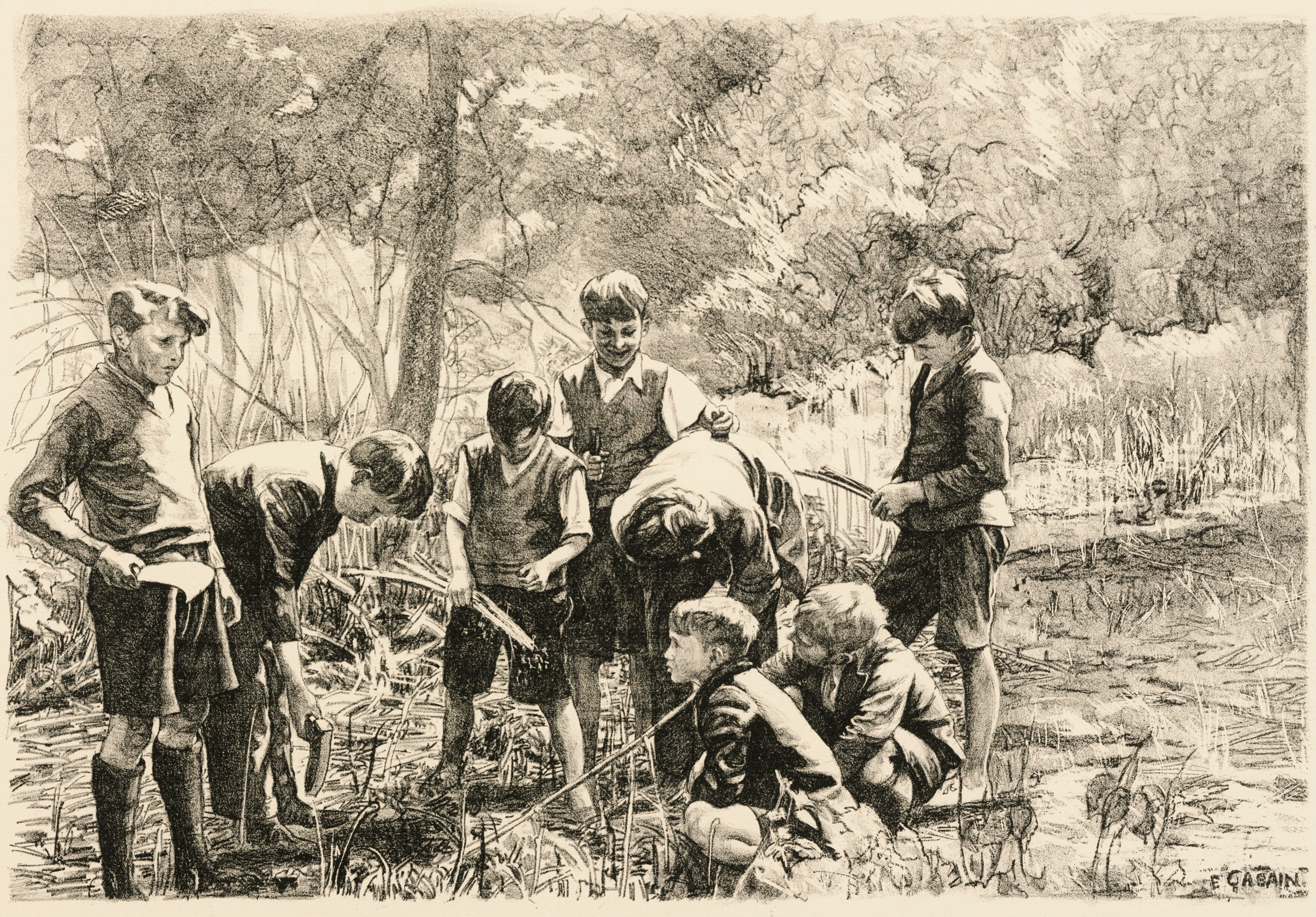
Illustration of evacuated boys from London playing in the countryside, by Gabain (1940)

Olive Shapley, an employee of the BBC during this period, said that the corporation's coverage of evacuation aimed to give reassurance to parents separated from their children and "encouragement" to families receiving evacuees. Coverage tended to focus on the experiences of evacuated children. Evacuation was also covered in newsreels from the time. For instance, the newsreel War! (1939) by Pathé News, on the reaction to the German invasion of Poland around Europe, included footage of calm-looking children boarding buses and trains. The narrator commented that " ... they start out on what to them is a great adventure ... our children move from the crowded cities to the care of new-found friends in safer places". The Ministry of Information produced various public information films promoting evacuation. Westward Ho! (1940) depicted children being evacuated to the seaside resort of Torquay. The Village School (1940) gave a positive portrayal of the education evacuated children were receiving, depicting children learning a variety of practical skills outdoors. Britannia Is a Woman (1940) emphasised the role of the WVS in helping to care for evacuees. Posters were also used to promote evacuation and reinforced the idea of it being an adventure for children.

The government established a system of press censorship and oversight. While newspapers had autonomy over the stories they wrote on evacuation, government documents indicate that officials and the press cooperated to present the scheme in a positive manner. Various newspapers praised the initial evacuation process in 1939; a correspondent for The Times called it a "Triumph of Planning". Much of the coverage given to the evacuation scheme in the press was favourable; for instance, reports in the Daily Express during the first months of the war depicted evacuation as an adventure children easily adjusted to and emphasised the dangers of them remaining in cities. Women's magazines placed a similar emphasis on the positives of evacuation, an October 1941 article in Woman's Own commented that "None of us can deny that space and fresh air and country food are best for growing girls and boys." An article in a local newspaper published in Carmarthen commented during 1945 that the treatment of evacuees sent to the area had been "Welsh hospitality at its best".

However, some of the press coverage of evacuation was more critical. Prior to the war, anxieties were expressed about the mixing of people from different backgrounds and some commentators argued that evacuees should only be placed with foster families of the same social class. After the scheme began, letters from readers which criticised the behaviour of evacuees appeared in newspapers. One such writer to the Glasgow Herald condemned "disobedient and verminous children polluting' country homes". Robert Ensor wrote in The Spectator in 1939 that many adult evacuees "were the lowest grade of slum women – slatternly malodorous tatterdemalions [unkempt, foul-smelling and poorly dressed] trailing children to match". A local newspaper in Windsor, Berkshire argued that the council should establish "concentration camps" to segregate the evacuees from local people. The press also reported on practical issues related to evacuation.

Evacuation was a frequent theme in wartime children's literature. Andrews suggests that authors used the topic as a literary device to give child characters autonomy from adults, similarly to the popular genre of children's books set in boarding schools. Foster families place few restrictions on children and are often peripheral to the story. Children's novels portrayed evacuation positively as an adventure in the countryside. These books emphasised that evacuated children remained involved in the war. In The Children of Primrose Lane (1941) they are shown capturing German spies; The Chalet School in Exile (1940) includes a child character who spies for the enemy. Numerous books depict child evacuees doing farm work, caring for vulnerable people and accepting challenges with enthusiasm.

=== Political and professional response ===
Contemporaries believed that evacuation was necessary in order to protect vulnerable groups from the expected violence and chaos of air raids. Professor J. B. S. Haldane predicted prior to the outbreak of war, based on his experiences of the Spanish Civil War, that mothers and children would flee from bombed cities in panic and be killed on the route. He believed that their evacuation ought to be organised by the government in order to prevent this. In 1940, Colonel Wedgwood, MP for Newcastle-Under-Lyme, argued that evacuation was necessary as men could not be expected to fight or work to repel an invasion unless they knew their families were safe. The Minister for Health, Malcolm MacDonald, argued in 1940 that evacuation would protect children emotionally as the effect air raids "... on their minds … may be very terrible." The placing of evacuees in private households was politically controversial. Many MPs for rural constituencies spoke against the idea in the House of Commons prior to the outbreak of war. Welsh nationalists worried that the evacuees sent to Wales, who were mostly English, would undermine Welsh culture. Sir Henry Fildes, the MP for Dumfriesshire, commented in 1940 that evacuation spread disease and was cowardly. Some psychologists argued that evacuation would be mentally damaging; making children feel unwanted and resentful.

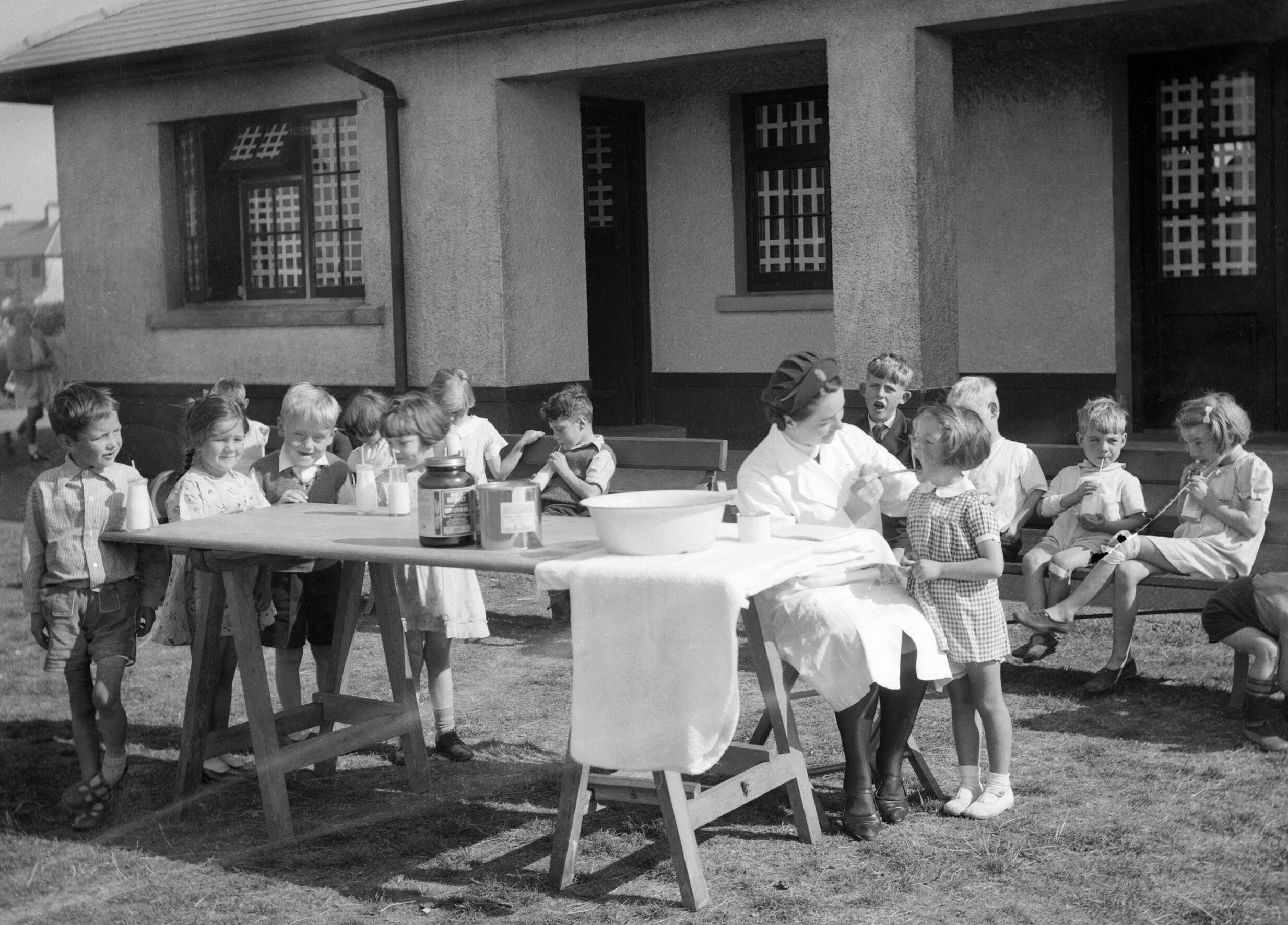
Child evacuees from London, receiving a medical inspection at school in Pen-y-groes, Carmarthenshire (1940)

The government sent many instructions to local authorities on subjects such as evacuees' health and protecting foster families' property. Billeting officers or volunteers acting on their behalf were required to frequently inspect the homes where unaccompanied child evacuees were staying. Local authorities funded social services for evacuees. In Westmorland a "psychiatric social worker" was appointed to help child evacuees with mental health problems and a sick bay was established where those with physical health problems could recuperate. Jonathan Taylor, an academic who has studied the subject, argues that the state respected parents' right to make decisions on behalf of their children. Evacuation was voluntary and, in May 1940, the government publicly promised it would remain so. The authorities feared that any attempt to make evacuation compulsory would produce a refusal of parents to obey the law.

Andrews argues that "evacuation made the care and protection of the young national concerns. Consequently, a multitude of social reformers, psychologists, psychoanalysts, child guidance and child welfare experts used evacuation to promote their own political or intellectual projects and the significance of their profession." Evacuation: Failure or Reform (1940), a report by the Fabian Society, argued that if evacuation was well organised it could create new facilities – "camp schools, village halls, clubs, nursery hostels and the like" – which would benefit society in the future. Numerous contemporary writers commented on issues related to evacuation; most frequently bedwetting and anxiety. Donald Winnicott and Clare Britton, a psychoanalysis social worker, helped to organise a number of hostels in Oxfordshire for child evacuees who were considered unsuitable to stay in private households. They believed that children needed a traditional family environment with firm discipline and tried to recreate that in their hostels. Susan Isaacs led a group of researchers who investigated the effect of family separation on child evacuees. They interviewed children and got them to write essays on their experience. Their research was published as the Cambridge Evacuation Survey (1941).

Our Towns: A Close Up (1943) was an academic report about evacuation written by the Women's Group on Public Welfare linked to the National Council for Social Service. The report argued that there were "problem families" among the poorest households who were "always on the edge of pauperism and crime, riddled with mental and physical defects, in and out of the courts for child neglect, a menace to the community". It suggested that improved education, both for schoolchildren and parents, could address these problems. However, the writers believed that environmental factors also contributed. They argued that the poor quality of many homes, made it difficult for parents to look after their children in a healthy and hygienic manner. The report recommended improved housing, family allowances, nursery schools, a minimum wage, free school meals and catering facilities in working-class areas where people could buy cooked meals. It also argued that prosecutions of parents who repeatedly neglected their children should be increased. The report Our Scottish Towns: Evacuation and the Social Future (1944) was written by the Scottish Women's Group on Public Welfare. The report argued that many evacuated women were lazy, frivolous, lacking domestic skills and did not discipline their children. It described the children as often unhygienic, unhealthy and poorly behaved. However, Our Scottish Towns put more emphasis on poverty being a cause of these problems than its English counterpart; commenting that many evacuated women and mothers of unaccompanied child evacuees "had suffered acutely from unemployment in their own childhood and subsequent married life."

== Legacy ==
=== Social impact ===
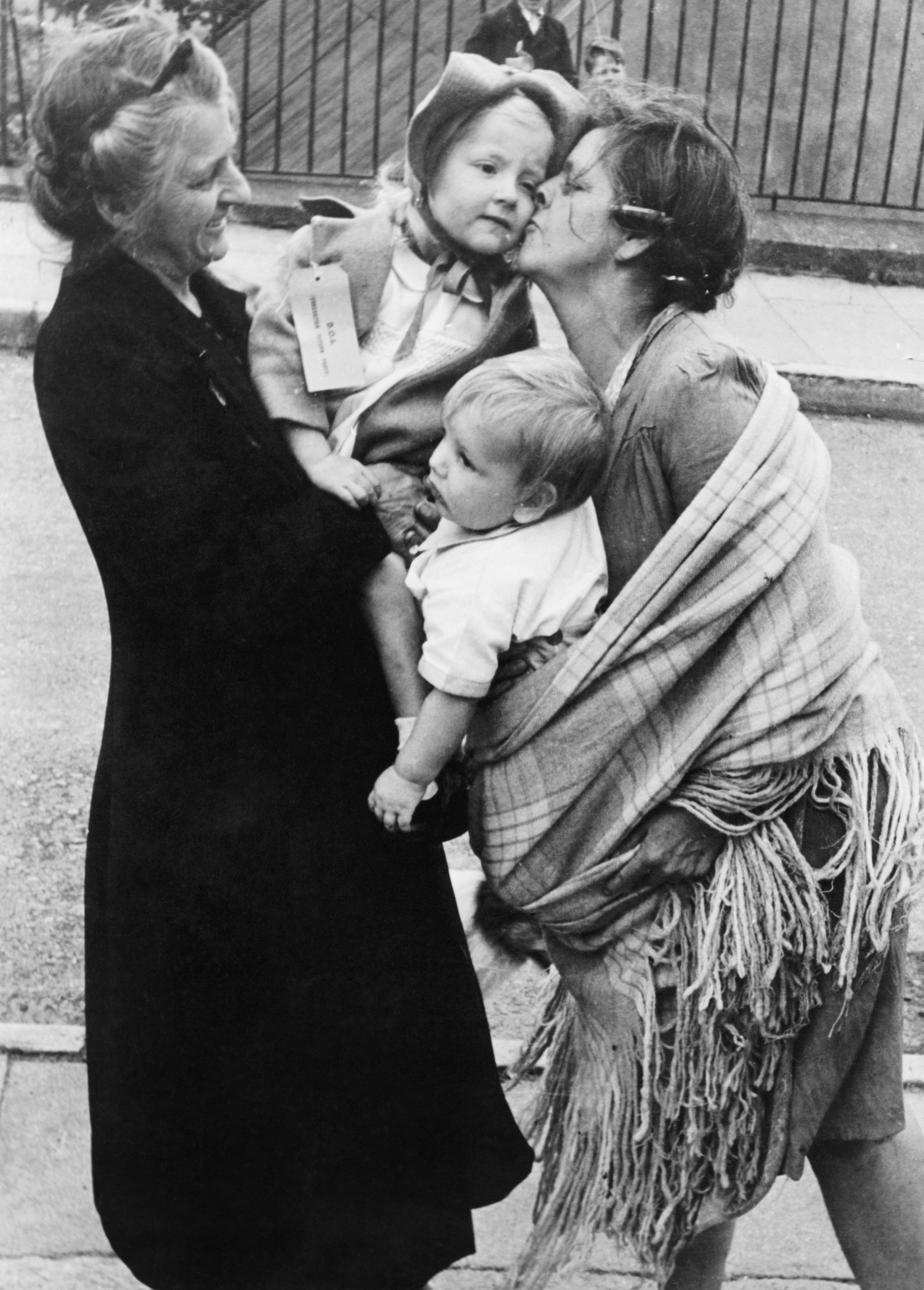
Child evacuee returning home

Summers estimated that more than 85 per cent of the former evacuees who she had interviewed or read the accounts of believed that evacuation had a broadly positive effect on their lives, although some within that group had found aspects of the experience difficult at the time or later. Some of her interviewees felt that the public discussion about evacuation emphasised negative experiences and that there was little interest in positive memories like their own. She argued that many children felt "privileged" that evacuation allowed them to see new things such as "Welsh male voice choirs, classical music, theatre, church, new foods, spring flowers, farmyard animals and country traditions". Former evacuees often remained in contact with their foster families for decades after the Second World War. One woman who was evacuated as a child attended her foster mother's 100th birthday party in 2012.

A significant proportion of evacuees spent only a few months or less away from home. Evacuated mothers, or the parents of unaccompanied child evacuees, often quickly left or collected their children. Other children ran away from their billets on their own initiative. For those who stayed for longer periods, returning home could be emotionally painful. A girl who was evacuated for five years as an adolescent later recalled; "I did not want to return. I cried most of the way back and when I first saw them I hardly recognised my parents. They felt like strangers to me. They spoke strangely, dressed differently and wanted affection from me, which I could not give." Some felt that evacuation had permanently damaged their relationship with their parents. The Picture Post reported in June 1945 that "thousands" of child evacuees were staying with their foster families "because no one wants them, because their parents have been killed, cannot be found or are involved in domestic difficulties that can better be solved without the presence of a child." The report argued that other children who would be better off staying with their foster families were being taken home due to the "obstinacy of an unsuitable parent".

A 2014 study by a group of academics at the University of Edinburgh examined the Scottish Mental Survey, conducted during 1947, which tested the intellectual abilities of Scottish school pupils born in 1936. The study found that the children who had been evacuated during the Second World War scored higher on the intelligence test than others. The researchers noted that the results contradicted a study of boys evacuated at a similar age from Finland. The academics suggested that evacuation may have been less traumatic for the Scottish children as they were sent to other areas of Scotland where English was the main language spoken; they would also have probably been accompanied by their mothers as they were mostly of preschool age when evacuated. The academics suggested that evacuation might have improved the children's intellectual development. They noted that a separate wartime study of adolescent Scottish evacuees found that they became better-behaved and more articulate. However, the researchers also suggested that the results might be explained by the parents who arranged for their children to be evacuated being generally more intelligent.

An academic study conducted in 1998 examined a group of former unaccompanied child evacuees from Kent to households in South West England or South Wales. The quality of the care each participant had received from their foster family was rated based on their own view and a written account of their memories of evacuation. The researchers used a questionnaire to assess the participants' attachment style, their approach to forming relationships, as adults. Secure attachment referred to a positive attitude to oneself and other people. Three other categories indicated a negative attitude to oneself, others or both. The study found that participants who had been evacuated as children were less likely to have a "secure" attachment style than a control group who had grown up in Kent during the same period but not been evacuated. Those who had received a better quality of care from their foster families were more likely to have a secure attachment style.

=== Culture ===
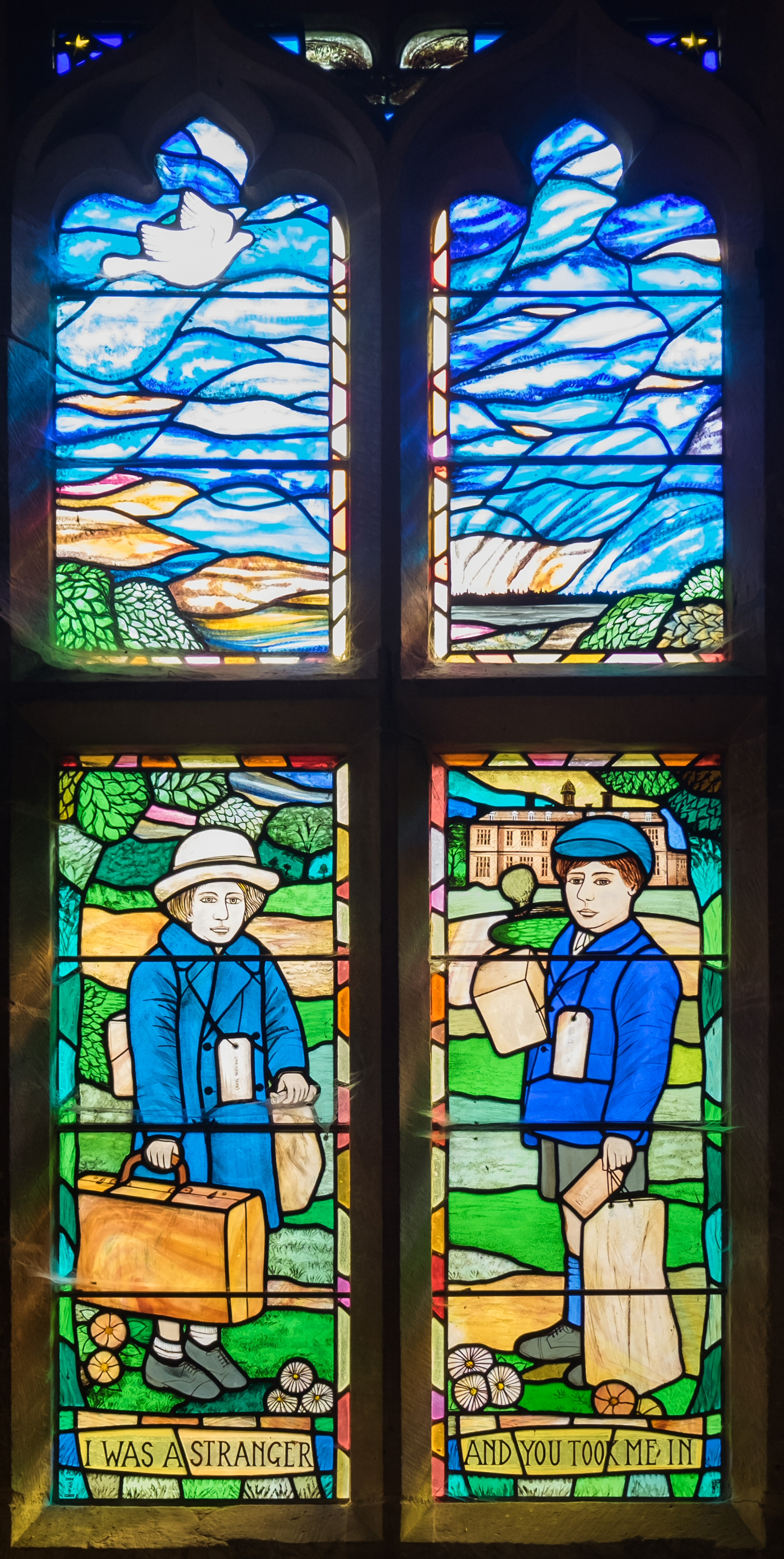
Stained-glass window commemorating evacuation in All Saints Church, Sudbury. It was given as a gift in 2001 by former evacuees to the area from Manchester.

John Stewart and John Welshman, historians of the subject, describe Problems of Social Policy (1950) by Richard Titmuss as the "most influential early interpretation" of the consequences of evacuation. The book was a civil history; its content was not controlled by the government but Titmuss was given access to official documents for research purposes. Titmuss argued that evacuation and air raids "stimulated inquiry and proposals for reform long before victory was even thought possible" with the consequence that "a big expansion took place in the responsibilities accepted by the State for those in need" in the post-war period. History books published in the decades immediately after the Second World War tended to repeat the argument that evacuation had contributed to the impetus for social reform. For instance, A. J. P. Taylor commented in 1965 that "the Luftwaffe [German Air Force] was a powerful missionary for the welfare state" and Derek Fraser, another historian, argued in 1973 that "the unkempt, ill-clothed, undernourished and often incontinent children of bombed cities acted as messengers carrying the evidence of the deprivation of urban working-class life into rural homes".

This interpretation began to be criticised as the mainstream of British politics shifted to the right in the late 20th century; for instance, Jose Harris argued in 1981 that "some kind of refinement and modification" was needed to Titmuss's perspective as there was little evidence the Second World War had led to "heightened government awareness of social welfare either as a tool of national efficiency or as a means of enhancing social solidarity". John Macnicol, a historian who wrote about the subject in the 1980s, argued that the result of evacuation was to "reinforce existing analyses of working-class poverty rather than to change them", referring to a view that problems faced by children were due to inadequate parenting and could be addressed through education rather than social welfare. However, some historians continued to argue that evacuation contributed to increased concern for the poor and interest in expanding social welfare.

The Lion, the Witch and the Wardrobe (1950), a children's novel by C. S. Lewis, depicts the evacuation of a group of children to a country mansion where a wardrobe gives them access to a fantasy world. Andrews argues that the novel has similar themes to portrayals of evacuation in children's books published during the Second World War; presenting child characters as self-reliant and giving the foster family little prominence. Paddington Bear, a children's book character created by Michael Bond in 1958, was based on the author's memories of seeing child evacuees leaving London during the Second World War. In the story, the small bear is found lost on Paddington Station, London and taken in by the Brown family. He is affectionately cared for by his adoptive mother and Mrs Bird, the housekeeper, who buy him new clothes and teach him how to behave. A film adaptation Paddington (2014) mentions evacuation. When Paddington is sent to London by his aunt at the start of the film, she assures the bear that he will be accepted as during a war in the past; "... thousands of children were sent away at railway stations with labels around their necks and unknown families took them in and loved them like their own."

In the late 20th century, cultural depictions of evacuation and the parents who sent their children away became more critical. Andrews linked this to the growth of "child-centred parenting"; the idea that the needs of children should be prioritised above the needs of those looking after them. In Carrie's War (1977) by Nina Bawden, the protagonist, who has been evacuated to Wales with her younger brother, is unhappy throughout much of the story and has a mother who takes little interest in her daughter. The two children find their foster family difficult to live with and rural Wales strange. In Goodnight Mister Tom (1981) by Michelle Magorian, the lead character is abused by his mother and evacuation allows him to find happiness living with his affectionate foster father. Both these novels have been adapted for television. The experience of adults has tended to be less prominent in cultural depictions of evacuation. The Doctor, the Widow and the Wardrobe (2011), a Christmas special of the science fiction television series Doctor Who, was unusual in portraying a mother who evacuates with her children.

Numerous local groups researched evacuation in their areas and individuals published autobiographies on their experience of evacuation. The Evacuees Reunion Association was founded in 1995. Between 2003 and 2006, the BBC's People's War website collected 14,336 accounts of childhood memories or evacuation during the Second World War. Documentaries, educational materials and museum exhibits about evacuation have often reused wartime propaganda that was originally intended to promote the scheme.

== Bibliography ==
=== Journals and news coverage ===
- Calvin, Catherine; Crang, Jeremy; Paterson, Lindsay; Deary, Ian (29 May 2014). "Childhood evacuation during World War II and subsequent cognitive ability: the Scottish Mental Survey 1947". Longitudinal and Life Course Studies. 5 (2). doi:10.14301/llcs.v5i2.255. hdl:20.500.11820/7f168994-a27b-4e57-ab40-9c79570783f1. ISSN 1757-9597.
- Dale, Caroline (12 April 2017). "'The Pied Piper Has Played His Tune': The Daily Express, Family and Evacuation in 1939". Media History. 23 (3–4): 405–426. doi:10.1080/13688804.2017.1309272. ISSN 1368-8804.
- Davies, Caroline (27 February 2017). "Britain's Child Migrant Programme: why 130,000 Children were Shipped Abroad". The Guardian. ISSN 0261-3077.
- "Eire Offers Home To Evacuees: Discussion With The British Government". The Irish Times. 23 October 1940. p. 5.
- "Evacuees for Ireland". The Irish Times. 8 March 1941. p. 7.
- "Homeless Mothers And Children: More Evacuation To Ireland". The Irish Times. 4 March 1941. p. 6.
- Lawrence, Michael (January 2015). "'Bombed into Stardom!' – Roddy McDowall, 'British Evacuee Star' in Hollywood". Journal of British Cinema and Television. 12 (1): 45–62. doi:10.3366/jbctv.2015.0242. ISSN 1743-4521.
- O'Malley, Tom (2 April 2017). "Was there a National Press in the UK in the Second World War?". Media History. 23 (3–4): 508–530. doi:10.1080/13688804.2017.1309273. ISSN 1368-8804.
- Pillot, Clémence (4 March 2021). "'For me, St Paul's would always be among the Pine Trees of Berkshire': English public schools and Wartime Evacuation (1939-45)". History of Education. 50 (2): 182–198. doi:10.1080/0046760X.2020.1825830. ISSN 0046-760X.
- Rusby, James S.M.; Tasker, Fiona (June 2008). "Childhood Temporary Separation: Long-term Effects of the British Evacuation of Children during World War 2 on Older Adults' Attachment Styles". Attachment & Human Development. 10 (2): 207–221. doi:10.1080/14616730802113737. ISSN 1461-6734.
- Stewart, John; Welshman, John (1 May 2006). "The Evacuation of Children in Wartime Scotland: Culture, Behaviour and Poverty". Journal of Scottish Historical Studies. 26 (1–2): 100–120. doi:10.3366/jshs.2006.26.1-2.100. ISSN 1748-538X.
- Talley, Lee A. (2022). "Operation Pied Piper: Children's WWII Evacuation Literature". Children's Literature. 50 (1): 195–221. doi:10.1353/chl.2022.0011. ISSN 1543-3374.
- Taylor, Jonathan (29 May 2020). "'[Her] Hostess … is Anxious to have her Back when she is Cured': The Impact of the Evacuation of Children on Wartime Local Services, England, 1939–1945". Medical Humanities. 46 (2): 144–153. doi:10.1136/medhum-2019-011784. ISSN 1468-215X. PMID 32471851.
- WAR !. Pathé News. British Pathé. 11 September 1939.
- Welshman, John (September 1999). "Evacuation, Hygiene, and Social Policy: The Our Towns Report of 1943". The Historical Journal. 42 (3): 781–807. doi:10.1017/s0018246x99008638. ISSN 0018-246X.

=== Books ===
- Andrews, Maggie (2021). Women and Evacuation in the Second World War: Femininity, Domesticity and Motherhood (Paperback ed.). Bloomsbury Academic. ISBN 9781350196162.
- Barton, Brian (2015). The Belfast Blitz: the City in the War Years. Ulster Historical Foundation. ISBN 9781909556324.
- Johnes, Martin (2012). Wales since 1939 (Repr ed.). Manchester Univ. Press. ISBN 9780719086670.
- Mawson, Gillian (2020). Britain's Wartime Evacuees: The People, Places and Stories of the Evacuations Told Through the Accounts of Those Who Were There (Paperback ed.). Frontline Books. ISBN 9781526781512.
- Mair, Kimberly (2023). The Biopolitics of Care in Second World War Britain. The mass-observation critical series. Bloombury Academic. ISBN 9781350282094.
- Ollerenshaw, Philip (2013). Northern Ireland in the Second World War: Politics, Economic Mobilisation and Society, 1939-45. Manchester University Press. ISBN 9781909556324.
- Rose, Sonya O. (2003). Which People's War? National Identity and Citizenship in Wartime Britain 1939-1945. Oxford University Press. ISBN 9780191001901.
- Shapira, Michal (2013). The War Inside: Psychoanalysis, Total War, and the Making of the Democratic Self in Postwar Britain. Studies in the social and cultural history of modern warfare. Cambridge University Press. ISBN 9781107290297.
- Summers, Julie (2011). When The Children Came Home: Stories of Wartime Evacuees. Simon & Schuster. ISBN 9781847398765.
- Titmuss, Richard (1951). Problems of Social Policy. History of the Second World War United Kingdom Civil Series.
