= The History of Western Education =

1921 book by William Boyd

- Title page for The History of Western Education (1932, 3rd Edition)
- Author: William Boyd
- Genre: Non-fiction
- Publication date: 1921

The History of Western Education is a 1921 book by a Scottish educator William Boyd, head of the Department of Education at Glasgow University in the first half of the 20th century.

The work has been described as "immensely successful" and "classic" and received ten editions between 1921 and 1972.

The 4th edition has been described as having "established itself as a standard work in the field of educational history".

The 7th edition has been expanded b Edmund J. King.

== See also ==
- Western education
