= Westward Ho! (1940 film) =

- Directed by: Thorold Dickinson
- Written by: Thorold Dickinson
- Narrated by: Donald Bull
- Cinematography: Desmond Dickinson
- Edited by: Sidney Cole
- Production company: D&P Studios
- Release date: 1940
- Running time: 8 min. 23 sec.
- Country: United Kingdom
- Language: English
- Budget: £450

Westward Ho! is a 1940 British short public information film directed by Thorold Dickinson about the evacuation of children during the Second World War. At the time, evacuation was a controversial policy, and the film was produced with the aim of building support for it.

Westward Ho! was the first of a series of five-minute propaganda films distributed weekly to cinemas between 1940 and 1942.

== Synopsis ==
A group of schoolchildren from London are preparing for evacuation. After a medical examination, they meet at a railway station, uncertain of their destination. The train arrives and their journey to the countryside begins. Many of them have never seen the countryside before, and enjoy looking out of the carriage windows during the trip.

Eventually, the children arrive at their destination, the Devon town of Torquay. After registration at a local school building, the children are handed over to the families who will be looking after them for the near future.

The following day, the children write to their parents to inform them of their new addresses and begin settling into their new school classes. They also start to adjust to other aspects of life in Torquay, including working in the fields and playing on the beach.

The film ends with a plea from mothers of other northern European countries, including Belgium and France. They urge British families to evacuate their children, wishing that they had had the same opportunity.

== Production ==
The production of Westward Ho! marked the beginning of a new Ministry of Information programme of five-minute propaganda films. According to Sir Kenneth Clark, Controller of Home Publicity for the Ministry of Information, the aim was "to help people to remember government messages by putting them in dramatic form". These films were distributed free to cinemas once a week between 1940 and 1942, when the programme stopped.

The project was initially placed under the leadership of Dallas Bower, who invited feature film director Thorold Dickinson to help create the inaugural production. The idea for the first film's subject came from a letter written to a newspaper from a mother who objected to evacuation. Westward Ho! was thus conceived as a way of showing the importance of evacuation, encouraging support for the policy and reassuring parents about the procedures that were in place. Production of the film was finished quickly, with the film receiving its premiere at the Dominion, on Tottenham Court Road, just two weeks after filming had begun. The total cost of the production was £450.

== Reception ==
Kine Weekly wrote: "Propaganda short manufactured by the Ministry of Information, revealing the organisation behind the evacuation of children. It also counsels parents who have not already evacuated their families to do. Belgian, Norwegian and French women, verbally support the plan. Treatment, commentary and photography adequate. Obvious booking on patriotic grounds."
