= Western education =

Education from the Western world

Western education is the form of education that mainly originated in or is characteristic of the Western world.

== History ==
=== Modern era ===
Progressive education, or educational progressivism, is a pedagogical movement that began in the late 19th century and has persisted in various forms to the present. In Europe, progressive education took the form of the New Education Movement. The term progressive was engaged to distinguish this education from the traditional curricula of the 19th century, which was rooted in classical preparation for the early-industrial university and strongly differentiated by social class. By contrast, progressive education finds its roots in modern, post-industrial experience. Most progressive education programs have these qualities in common:

- Emphasis on learning by doing – hands-on projects, expeditionary learning, experiential learning
- Integrated curriculum focused on thematic units
- Strong emphasis on problem solving and critical thinking
- Group work and development of social skills
- Understanding and action as the goals of learning as opposed to rote knowledge
- Collaborative and cooperative learning projects
- Education for social responsibility and democracy
- Integration of community service and service learning projects into the daily curriculum
- Selection of subject content by looking forward to ask what skills will be needed in future society
- De-emphasis on textbooks in favor of varied learning resources
- Emphasis on lifelong learning and social skills
- Assessment by evaluation of child's projects and productions

== Pre-contemporary history outside of the West ==
The introduction of Western education into the rest of the world occurred to a large degree through imperialism. This affected the way that Western education was absorbed and influenced by the world.

=== Africa ===
The colonial period, beginning in the 19th century, began to replace traditional African education with formal European styles. Colonial powers did not view investing in African education as a practical use of their revenue or refrained from educating Africans to avoid uprisings. Those in positions of authority were specifically afraid of widespread access to higher education among the native populations.

=== East Asia ===
In China, as reformers sought to grapple with the foreign domination of the late 19th century, they came to a conclusion of re-ordering Chinese society through a process of self-strengthening, which included taking ideas from the West.

Even before the Edo period, Japan had established significant contact with Western knowledge through Rangaku (Dutch Learning). While maintaining its isolationist sakoku policy, Japan permitted limited trade with the Dutch East India Company at Dejima, Nagasaki. This unique arrangement allowed Japanese scholars to study Western medicine, astronomy, mathematics, and other sciences through Dutch books and interactions with Dutch traders. Rangaku scholars like Sugita Genpaku and Maeno Ryōtaku made groundbreaking translations of Dutch medical texts, including the influential "Kaitai Shinsho" (New Book of Anatomy), which introduced Western medical knowledge to Japan. This early exposure to Western learning through the Dutch connection laid an important foundation for Japan's later modernization efforts during the Meiji era, when Japan sought to further modernize itself by learning from the West. It sent scholars and diplomats to Western countries to learn from their education systems.

=== South Asia ===
The Jesuits introduced India to both the European college system and book printing by founding Saint Paul's College in Goa in 1542. The French traveler François Pyrard de Laval, who visited Goa around 1608, described the College of St. Paul and praised the variety of subjects taught there free of charge. Like many other European travelers who visited the college, he recorded that it had 3,000 students at the time, drawn from missions across Asia. Its library was one of the largest in Asia, and the first printing press in the region was established there in September 1556.

The British colonised India starting in the late 18th century, and began to impose Western education by the early 19th century. They saw this as a highly positive step, and felt that it was a way to civilise the people. Native kingdoms also sometimes sought such education to understand how to deal with the British threat.

== Comparison with other educational systems ==
=== Asian education ===
Chinese/Eastern education has been contrasted with Western education on the basis of aiming to encourage individuals to acquire the discipline necessary to learn and therefore provide honor to their families.

=== Islamic education ===
Since the colonial era, Muslim leaders have decried Western education as failing to instill moral values, with its secular nature also seen as problematic.

== See also ==
- English-medium education
- The History of Western Education
- Western values
