= William Boyd (educator) =

William Boyd was a Scottish educator (1874-1962) and head of the Education Department at the University of Glasgow for nearly four decades.

He is best known for his classic The History of Western Education which received 10 editions from 1921 to 1972.

He was active in the Scottish Council for Research in Education.
