= Clarence Elder =

British art director

- Occupations: Director, Screenwriter, Art Director
- Years active: 1930-1947 (film)

Clarence Elder was a British art director. During the 1930s he worked for British International Pictures. In 1947 he directed his only film Silver Darlings.

== Selected filmography ==
- The Way of Lost Souls (1929)
- The Yellow Mask (1930)
- The Flame of Love (1930)
- The Flying Fool (1931)
- Fascination (1931)
- Potiphar's Wife (1931)
- The Maid of the Mountains (1932)
- The Indiscretions of Eve (1932)
- Abdul the Damned (1935)
- Invitation to the Waltz (1935)
- I Give My Heart (1935)
- The Student's Romance (1935)
- Music Hath Charms (1935)
- Heart's Desire (1936)
- The Silver Darlings (1947)

== Bibliography ==
- Bergfelder, Tim & Cargnelli, Christian. Destination London: German-speaking emigrés and British cinema, 1925-1950. Berghahn Books, 2008.
