= I'll Stay with You =

I'll Stay with You may refer to:

== Songs ==
- "I'll Stay with You", a song by Beth Hart from Leave the Light On
- "I'll Stay with You", a song by Luna Sea, B-side of "Limit"
- "I'll Stay with You", a song by Russell Morris from A Thousand Suns and Almost Frantic
- "I'll Stay with You", a song by New Order from Lost Sirens
- "I'll Stay with You", a song from the soundtrack of There Goes the Bride

== Other uses ==
- I'll Stay with You (film) or Ich bleib' bei Dir, a 1931 German romantic comedy film
