= The Fire Raisers =

The Fire Raisers may refer to

- The Fire Raisers (film), a 1934 British film starring Leslie Banks
- The Fire Raisers (play), a.k.a. The Firebugs, a 1953 German play
