= Land Without Music =

1936 film

- Theatrical release poster
- Directed by: Walter Forde
- Written by: Armin Robinson (story); Fritz Koselka (story); Rudolf Bernauer (adaptation); Ernest Betts (additional dialogue); Eric Maschwitz (additional dialogue); Marion Dix (writer); L. du Garde Peach (writer)
- Produced by: Max Schach
- Starring: Jimmy Durante
- Cinematography: John W. Boyle
- Edited by: Lynn Harrison
- Music by: Oscar Straus; Van Phillips
- Production company: Capitol Film Corporation
- Distributed by: General Film Distributors
- Release date: 8 October 1936
- Running time: 80 minutes
- Country: United Kingdom
- Language: English

Land Without Music (also known as City Without Music and Land Without Song; U.S.title: Forbidden Music) is a 1936 British comedy film directed by Walter Forde and starring Richard Tauber, Diana Napier and Jimmy Durante. It was written by Armin Robinson, Fritz Koselka, Rudolf Bernauer, Ernest Betts, Eric Maschwitz, Marion Dix and L. du Garde Peach. It was made at Denham Studios.

== Plot summary ==
After discovering that her state is penniless because its citizens spend their time making music instead of money, Princess-Regent Maria Renata bans music in her domains. A New York journalist conspires with rogues to stage a concert.

== Cast ==
- Richard Tauber as Mario Carlini
- Diana Napier as Princess-Regent Maria Renata
- Jimmy Durante as Jonah J. Whistler
- June Clyde as Sadie Whistler
- Derrick De Marney as Rudolpho Strozzi
- George Hayes as Police Colonel Strozzi
- Esmé Percy as Austrian Ambassador
- John Hepworth as Pedro
- Edward Rigby as The Maestro
- George Carney as prison warder
- Ivan Wilmot as chief bandit
- Robert Nainby as Minister for War
- Joe Monkhouse as Finance Minister
- Quentin McPhearson as Customs Officer
- Evelyn Ankers as a Lady of the Court (uncredited; "Who's Carlini?" sequence)

== Soundtrack ==
The musical score was composed by Oscar Straus. The main songs are "Simple Little Melody", '"Smile for Me", "Heaven in a Song" and "You Must Have Music", all of which were recorded by Tauber for Parlophone.

== Reception ==
The Monthly Film Bulletin wrote: "The story is amusing, and Oscar Strauss' music is very agreeable. Richard Tauber's fine singing is well recorded. In fact, this is a musical comedy that contains real music and real comedy. The acting on the whole is competent, though Diana Napier is hardly convincing as the Duchess. The direction is straightforward, if a little unenterprising in the way of lighting, grouping, and choice of camera-angle."

The Daily Film Renter wrote: "Oscar Strauss musical, with Richard Tauber singing brilliantly as famous tenor who helps to free music-loving Italian Duchy from melody ban imposed by Princess Regent anxious the peasantry shall work off debt to Austria. Elaborately staged in Ruritanian settings, with superb rural exteriors and vast cave as scenic highlights subject has huge crowd sequences, effective massed vocalism, touches of amusing Durante comedy, and pleasing romantic motif. Musical numbers well suited to star. Excellent entertainment, particularly for Tauber following."

Kine Weekly wrote: "Buiilt to accommodate the delightful singing of Richard Tauber, who incidentally is in superb voice, this screen operetta sets its tuneful music in a period atmophere [sic] of fragrant picturesqueness. The story is no literary masterpiece, but it is pleasant enough and more than equal to the light and agreeable task of providing background for the Oscar Strauss' score. It contains moments of artless humour, dispensed with boisterous bravado by Jimmy Durante, and a hint of popular romance, both of which help to round the entertainment off. The film is not, of course, expressly designed for the industrial element; it is a little too dainty and airy."

Picturegoer wrote: "It has become, happily, the fashion in musical films to have some sort of plot justification for the music; characters no longer burst into song without excuse or warning, and at first sight it would seem that the producers of Land Without Music had found a perfect musical vehicle ... The film opens beautifully with a field in which a ploughman is singing at his work and a shepherd pipes to his flock. They become interested in harmony, and the horses and the sheep are allowed to follow their own devices. However, when the story comes into the studio it becomes artificial and forced, and its main recommendation lies in the opportunities it affords for Richard Tauber to sing – which he does in his usual superb manner."

Variety wrote: "Operetta built around Richard Tauber, continental singer, and one of the few real novelties British pictures have turned out in motion picture form. Film is very good light musical, with a quaint plot and plenty of tunes, and has Jimmy Durante playing comedy in a 19th century costume and making a go of it. One up for Max Schach, being about the slickest job he has yet produced."
