= Anne Vernon =

French actress (born 1924)

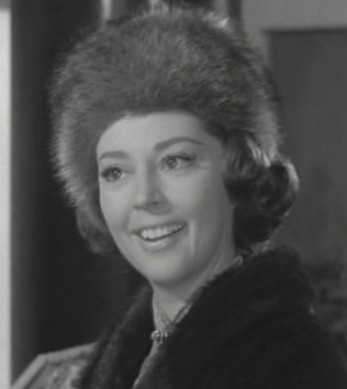
- Vernon in Count Max (1957)
- Born: Édith Antoinette Alexandrine Vignaud; 9 January 1924 (age 102); Saint-Denis, Seine-Saint-Denis, France
- Occupation: Actress
- Years active: 1948–1972; 1995
- Spouse: Robert Badinter (m. 1957; divorced)

Anne Vernon (born Édith Antoinette Alexandrine Vignaud; 9 January 1924) is a French retired film and television actress who appeared in 40 films between 1948 and 1970, including three films that were entered into the main competition at the Cannes Film Festival. She appeared in films of multiple countries, including French, British, Italian, and American. As of 2025, she is believed to be among the last surviving leading ladies of the 1940s cinema.

== Career ==
Anne Vernon made her film debut in the 1948 French-Belgian film The Murdered Model, playing the supporting role of Irène. In 1949, she starred in the British romantic comedy Warning to Wantons opposite Harold Warrender. The same year, she starred in the French drama Thus Finishes the Night with Claude Dauphin. She appeared in her only American film in 1950, having a secondary role in the film noir Shakedown.

Vernon continued being a leading lady throughout the 1950s across different genres in multiple countries. These include Edward and Caroline, a French comedy film that competed at the 1951 Cannes Film Festival, and MGM British's 1953 production Time Bomb, a film noir where she played the wife of Glenn Ford's character. In 1955, she starred in an Eastern German film called Das Fräulein von Scuderi. She had a supporting role in the Italian-French drama General Della Rovere, which won the Golden Lion at the 1959 Venice International Film Festival. She was in the 1958 short film La Joconde: Histoire d'une obsession, which won the Palme d'Or at the 1958 Cannes Film Festival.

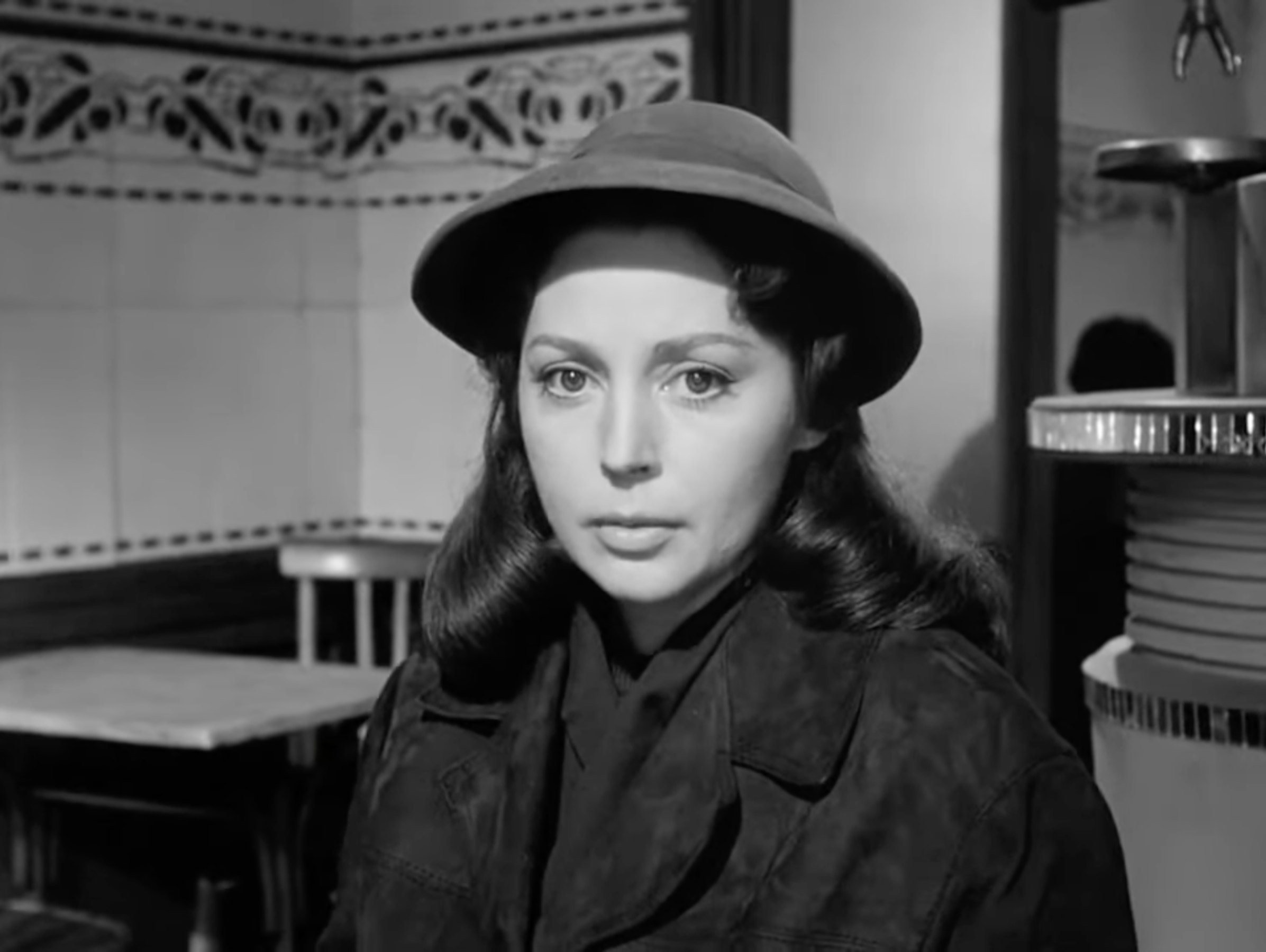
Vernon in Il generale Della Rovere (1959)

In 1964, Vernon played the mother of Catherine Deneuve's character Geneviève in the French-West German musical The Umbrellas of Cherbourg. The film won the Palme d'Or at the 1964 Cannes Film Festival. In the United States, it was nominated for five Academy Awards, including Best Foreign-Language Film, Best Original Screenplay (Demy), and Best Original Score (Demy and Legrand). The film's main theme, "I Will Wait for You", was nominated for Best Original Song. It was later adapted into an English-language stage musical. In 2018, a BBC Culture critics' poll ranked the film in the Top 100 Greatest Non-English Films of All Time.

By the late 1960s, Vernon's film career had slowed down. Her last film role was in the erotic drama Therese and Isabelle (1968). She, however, continued to work in various television series and TV movies.

== Personal life ==
Vernon was married three times. She married lawyer Robert Badinter in 1957. They divorced in 1965. Her second husband was René Gainville, a film director to whom she was married between 1970-1975. In 1988, she married Jean-Pierre Prouteau, a marriage that lasted for ten years until his death in 1998.

Vernon celebrated her 100th birthday on 9 January 2024, making her a centenarian.

== Filmography ==
Year	Title	Role	Country
1948	The Murdered Model	Irène	France/Belgium
1949	Warning to Wantons	Renée de Vaillant	United Kingdom
1949	Thus Finishes the Night	Catherine Beryl	France
1950	Shakedown	Nita Palmer	United States
1950	Pact with the Devil	Andrea Mola's sister	Italy
1951	A Tale of Five Cities	Jeannine Meunier	United Kingdom/Italy
1951	Rue des Saussaies	Jeanne Masson	France
1951	Edward and Caroline	Caroline Mortier	France
1952	The Mistress of Treves	Genoveffa di Brabante	France/Italy/West Germany
1952	Song of Paris	Clementine	United Kingdom
1952	Massacre in Lace	Thérésa Larsen	France
1953	Time Bomb	Janine Lyncort	United Kingdom
1953	Rue de l'Estrapade	Françoise Laurent	France
1953	Jeunes Maries	Gisèle Delaroche	France
1954	The Love Lottery	Jane Dubois	United Kingdom
1955	Das Fräulein von Scuderi	Madelon	East Germany
1955	Beautiful but Dangerous	Carmela	Italy/France
1955	Bel Ami	Clothilde de Marelle	Austria/France/East Germany
1955	The Affair of the Poisons	Hermine Des Oeillets	France/Italy
1956	Suspicion	Claire Grandjean	France
1956	The Width of the Pavement	Hélène Dupré	France/Italy
1956	Ce Soir les Jupons Volent	Catherine Piedeboeuf	France
1957	Robbery in Old Lace	Françoise Dumont	France
1957	The Suspects	Lucette Vignon	France
1957	Les Lavandières du Portugal	Catherine Deligny	France
1957	Judicial Police	Violette Chatelard	France
1957	Count Max	Baroness Elena di Villombrosa	Italy/Spain
1958	La Joconde: histoire d'une obsession (short)		France
1959	General Della Rovere	Clara Fassio	Italy/France
1959	El Casco Blanco		France/Spain
1961	Laura Nuda	Claudia	Italy/France
1962	Arsène Lupin Versus Arsène Lupin	Madame de Bellac	France/Italy
1964	The Umbrellas of Cherbourg	Madame Emery	France/West Germany
1964	Friend of the Family	Véronique Carradine	France/Italy
1966	Trap for the Assassin	Henriette Laroque	France/Italy
1966	Man from Mykonos	Dorothée	France/Italy/Belgium
1966	The Sea Pirate	Decrees	France/Italy/Spain
1968	The Woman is a Stranger	Sophie	France
1968	Therese and Isabelle	Mademoiselle Le Blanc	France/Netherlands/United States/West Germany

== Television ==
- Reves d'amour (aka Dreams of Love) (1962) (TV Movie)
- Le Tartuffe (1962) (TV Movie)
- Dernier Amour (1963) (TV Movie)
- Bonjour Tristesse (1965) (TV Movie)
- Illusions Perdues (aka Lost Illusions) (1965) (TV Series)
- Malican peres et fils (1967) (TV Series)
- Au Theatre ce Soir (1969) (TV Series)
- Le Cyborg ou Le Voyage Vertical (1970) (TV Movie)
- Mauregard (1970) (TV Series)
- Les Dernieres volontes de Richard Lagrange (TV Series) (1972)
- Pont Dormant (1972) (TV Series)
