= Alice Ellis =

Alice Ellis may refer to:

- Diana Napier (1905–1982), née Alice Ellis, English film actress
- Alice Thomas Ellis (1932–2005), English writer and essayist
