= Jacques Brown =

British television producer (1900–1975)

Jacques Brown (first name pronounced "Jakes") (23 August 1900 – 3 April 1975) was a British radio producer. He produced Much-Binding-in-the-Marsh, The Goon Show, Beyond Our Ken and others for BBC Radio.

He was born Solomon Jacob Brown in Toxteth Park, Liverpool. A trumpet player in his youth, he had many stories to tell of being a jobbing musician in London in the 1920s. He performed in a number of minor acting roles before becoming a producer.

After retiring from the BBC to nurse his wife, who was seriously ill with cancer from which she later died, he helped his brother-in-law with his cake decorating business until his death, and the business folded after the postal workers strike of 1971.

He retired to Hampshire where he lived with an old friend, Mrs. W. I. Dismore, herself a widow, until his death, caused by complications after a car accident, on 3 April 1975.

== Filmography ==
Year	Title	Role	Notes
1937	Good Morning, Boys	Devil's Kitchen Manager	Uncredited
1941	South American George	Enrico Richardo	
1941	Hi Gang!	Botticelli	
1945	I Didn't Do It	Professor Borgensen	Uncredited
1948	Under the Frozen Falls	Professor Bell-Wrighton	
1953	Always a Bride	Manager	
