= Warning to Wantons =

- Directed by: Donald Wilson
- Written by: James Laver; Donald Wilson
- Based on: novel A Warning to Wantons by Mary Mitchell
- Starring: Harold Warrender; Anne Vernon; David Tomlinson
- Cinematography: George Stretton
- Edited by: Frederick Wilson; Sidney Hayers
- Music by: Hans May
- Production company: Aquila Film
- Distributed by: General Film Distributors (UK)
- Release dates: 4 January 1949 (London, England)
- Running time: 105 minutes
- Country: United Kingdom
- Language: English
- Budget: £125,000

Warning to Wantons is a 1949 British romantic comedy film directed by Donald Wilson and starring Harold Warrender, Anne Vernon and David Tomlinson. The screenplay, written by art historian James Laver and the director, was based upon Mary Mitchell's 1934 novel A Warning to Wantons.

== Premise ==
A young woman escapes her strict convent school and enters high society, where she has the time of her life.

== Cast ==
Credited

- Harold Warrender as Count Anton Kardak
- Anne Vernon as Renee de Vaillant
- David Tomlinson as Count Max Kardak
- Sonia Holm as Maria
- Hugh Cross as Pauli
- Marie Burke as Therese
- Judy Kelly as Mimi de Vaillant
- Ellen Pollock as Baroness de Jammes
- Andre Van Gyseghem as Oblensky
- Bruce Belfrage as Archimandrite
- Dennis Vance as Franklin Budd
- Jack Melford as Maurice Lugard
- Brian Oulton as Gilbertier

Uncredited

- Stanley Ratcliffe as Baroud
- Aletha Orr as Mrs. Budd
- Claud Frederic as Padara
- Ida Patlanski as Mrs. Padera
- Olwen Brookes as Mdme. Bertrand
- Kenneth Firth as Achille
- John Warren as Grobner
- Mela White as Madeleine
- Alexander Field as Woodman
- Betty Thomas as Hortense
- Frank Cochrane as Gaston
- Nancy Roberts as Mother Superior
- Grace Denbigh Russell as nurse
- Margaret Damer as 1st nun
- Harriet Petworth as 2nd nun
- Michael Balzagette as ticket collector
- Patricia Davidson as 1st maid
- David Keir as concierge
- Herbert C. Walton as quarry peasant
- Peter Faber as page
- Pauline Loring as 1st female relative
- Vincent Ball as Earl (hootman)

== Production ==
It was the first of four films produced by Donald Wilson using prefabricated sets to keep costs down. Filming took six weeks. The film was one of the four of David Rawnsley's films that used his "independent frame" technique, a form of back projection.

== Reception ==
Kine Weekly wrote: "The picture compels its audience to take far too much on trust. The staging is spectacular, but this is insufficient compensation for the many inconsistencies in treatment and presentation. It is therefore small wonder that the players, try as they may, failto raise many laughs, touch thee heart or deliver its heavily veiled warning to wild young females. Almost completely baffled ourselves, we fear to contemplate ihe ninepennies' reactions."

Picturegoer wrote: "I found it all highly diverting, if a bit slow after the first half. Sonia. Holm seems too stolidly English as Maria for the play's setting, but Harold Warrender is a delight as the man with a long list of amorous conquests to his credit – or discredit. As Max David Tomlinson is gauchely naive, as only he knows. I hope that during the year we shall have as many more comedies as amusing as this one."

Picture Show wrote: "Heavy-handed handling of what should have been a gay, whimsical trifle, results in this being a pedestrian sort of warning. It is quite well acted, but the fanciful story is a little too confusing."

Variety wrote: "First of the Independent Frame productions to be made for general exhibition, Warning to Wantons bears no obvious traces of this new factory-like method of film making, other than the introduction of new technical grades such as frame supervisor, transparency photographer and transparency projection. Although its production qualities are commendable, the novelettish theme and the limitations of the script make this a doubtful starter for American audiences. ...Plot itself is light and inconsequential but with a more polished script it might have been a scintillating comedy. As it is, only Anne Vernon, in the femme lead, really captures the spirit of the theme and comes to life. Neither Harold Warrender as the count, nor David Tomlinson as his erring son, appear happy in their parts and Sonia Holm tends to overdo the jealous wife who schemes to get her rival out of the way."

TV Guide called the film a "A spirited romantic comedy," and rated it two out of four stars.
