= Pagliacci (1936 film) =

- Directed by: Karl Grune
- Written by: Ruggero Leoncavallo (libretto); Roger Burford; John Drinkwater; Monckton Hoffe
- Produced by: Max Schach
- Starring: Richard Tauber; Steffi Duna; Diana Napier
- Cinematography: Otto Kanturek
- Edited by: Walter Stokvis
- Music by: Albert Coates; Hanns Eisler
- Production company: Trafalgar Films
- Distributed by: United Artists
- Release date: 11 December 1936
- Running time: 92 minutes
- Country: United Kingdom
- Language: English

Pagliacci (also known as A Clown Must Laugh) is a 1936 British musical film directed by Karl Grune and starring Richard Tauber, Steffi Duna and Diana Napier. The story was adapted by Monckton Hoffe and Roger Burford from the 1892 opera Pagliacci by Ruggiero Leoncavallo, with lyrics by John Drinkwater.

== Cast ==
- Richard Tauber as Canio Salvatini
- Steffi Duna as Nedda Salvatini
- Diana Napier as Trina
- Arthur Margetson as Tonio
- Esmond Knight as Cadet Silvio
- Jerry Verno as Beppe, comic trouper
- Gordon James as Leone
- Harry Milton as Cadet
- Ivan Wilmot as Silvio's coach driver
- John Traynor as coach-home builder

== Production ==
The film was shot partially in colour, using "British Chemicolour", and partially in black-and-white. The film's art direction was by Oscar Friedrich Werndorff. The film was made by the independent Trafalgar Films at Elstree Studios. It was a very expensive production, with Tauber receiving £60,000, which turned into a costly flop on its release.

Caught up in the technical procedures of the colour sequences, Grune asked Wendy Toye to direct the actors for him.

== Reception ==
The Monthly Film Bulletin wrote: "Production is good, and acting on a high level; the film is inclined to drag a little, however, in the middle of the story, and it seems a pity that the operatic technique which has been applied to beginning and end was not applied consistently all through. Tauber's singing is, of course, the main item in the film, and he will not disappoint his admirers."

Kine Weekly wrote: "Adapted with fine artistry and compelling vocal distinction. The essential box-office compromise between story values and operatic excerpt has been brilliantly achieved through the superb versatility of Richard Tauber – his rendering of 'On with the Motley,' and the famous prologue is magnificent, and the sincerity of his acting matches his vocal triumphs – while to augment the delicate, yet tremendously poignant, entertainment, there is competent support and artistic stagecraft, delightfully amplified by dainty sequences in Chemicolour. Outstanding proposition for high-class halls."

== See also ==
- List of early color feature films
