= Thus Finishes the Night =

1949 film directed by Emil E. Reinert

- Directed by: Emil E. Reinert
- Written by: René Jolivet; Jacques Natanson; Henri Schneider
- Produced by: Robert Woog
- Starring: Anne Vernon; Claude Dauphin; Henri Guisol
- Cinematography: Roger Dormoy
- Edited by: Isabelle Elman
- Music by: Joe Hajos
- Production company: Films Metzger et Woog
- Distributed by: Les Films Corona; Les Films Osso (Belgium)
- Release date: 17 August 1949
- Running time: 90 minutes
- Country: France
- Language: French

Thus Finishes the Night (French: Ainsi finite la nuit) is a 1949 French drama film directed by Emil E. Reinert and starring Anne Vernon, Claude Dauphin and Henri Guisol. It was shot at the Billancourt Studios in Paris. The film's sets were designed by the art director Lucien Aguettand.

== Synopsis ==
A woman begins an affair with a concert pianist.

== Cast ==
- Anne Vernon as Catherine Beryl
- Claude Dauphin as Le pianiste André Fuger
- Henri Guisol as Le procureur Georges Beryl
- Katherine Kath as Une voyageuse
- André Versini as Le commis-voyageur Guy Moret
- Albert Duvaleix as Prunier - le concierge du théâtre
- Gilberte Géniat as Jeannette
- Mona Dol as La mère de Catherine
- Albert Michel as Le contrôleur
- Hennery as Ernest
- Léon Pauléon as Un voyageur

== Bibliography ==
- Rège, Philippe. Encyclopedia of French Film Directors, Volume 1. Scarecrow Press, 2009.
