= Bait (1950 film) =

British crime film by Frank Richardson

- Directed by: Frank Richardson
- Screenplay by: Mary Benedetta; Francis Miller; Frank Richardson
- Based on: Stage play by Frank Richardson
- Produced by: Frank Richardson
- Starring: Diana Napier; John Bentley; Willoughby Goddard
- Cinematography: Ernest Palmer; Vic Thomas
- Edited by: John House; Peter Curran
- Music by: Paxtons
- Production company: Adelphi Films
- Release date: January 1950 (U.K)
- Running time: 73 minutes
- Country: United Kingdom
- Language: English

Bait is a 1950 British second feature ('B') crime film directed and produced by Frank Richardson and starring Diana Napier, John Bentley, Willoughby Goddard and John Oxford. It was written by Mary Benedetta, Francis Miller and Richardson, based on the latter's stage play. It was produced by Adelphi Films. A gang steals some diamonds, sells them on the black market and then plan to steal them back again.

== Plot ==
A team of four jewellery thieves, headed by Diana Napier, make off with two exceptionally valuable diamonds taken from a pair of earrings. Napier sells them to a dishonest businessman at his country estate, but the gang plans to return later and steal them back. However, Goddard's long-lost half-brother suddenly returns to the estate accompanied by his new fiancée. Bentley wants to claim his half of the inheritance, but soon discovers that his half-brother has squandered the family fortune and is now engaged in buying and selling stolen gems. He confronts Goddard, who panics, and hits Bentley over the head with a poker. As he is about to strike a death blow, a shot rings out and Goddard falls dead. The police arrest Bentley for the murder but soon have to release him for lack of evidence. Meanwhile, Goddard's fiancée tries to find the real killer by playing up to one of the members of the gang, who happens to be an old boyfriend of hers.

== Cast ==
- Diana Napier as Eleanor Parton
- John Bentley as DuCane
- John Oxford as Bromley
- Patricia Owens as Anna Hastings
- Kenneth Hyde as Jim Prentiss
- Willoughby Goddard as John Hartley
- Sheila Robins as Nina Revere

== Reception ==
The Monthly Film Bulletin wrote: "Amateurish melodrama; lack of continuity and erratic editing make this very shoddy British quota."

Kine Weekly wrote: "Romantic crime melodrama, indifferently written, cast, staged and directed. ... The picture not only has a cheap and novelettish story, but scratches about for the most part in the dark."

Picturegoer wrote: "Indifferent romantic crime melodrama dealing with the adventures of a gang of jewel thieves. Novelettish story, and one which is hard to follow. Diana Napier is weak as the heroine and the rest of the cast are no better."

Hal Erickson writing for AllMovie, noted that: "ladylike Diana Napier is unexpectedly coarse as the female gang boss in Bait." He concluded: "A knuckle tough British programmer, Bait is well acted by all concerned."
