= The Great Defender =

- Opening titles
- Directed by: Thomas Bentley
- Written by: John Hastings Turner; Paul Perez; Marjorie Deans
- Produced by: Walter C. Mycroft
- Starring: Matheson Lang; Margaret Bannerman; Arthur Margetson; Richard Bird
- Cinematography: Jack E. Cox; Phil Grindrod
- Edited by: Walter Stokvis
- Production company: British International Pictures
- Distributed by: Wardour Films
- Release date: 3 July 1934
- Running time: 72 minutes
- Country: United Kingdom
- Language: English

The Great Defender is a 1934 British mystery film directed by Thomas Bentley and starring Matheson Lang, Margaret Bannerman and Arthur Margetson. It was written by John Hastings Turner, Paul Perez and Marjorie Deans, and shot at Welwyn Studios in Hertfordshire with sets designed by the art director John Mead.

== Synopsis ==
A top barrister conducts the defence of an artist facing the death penalty for allegedly murdering his model, while himself battling with serious illness.

== Cast ==
- Matheson Lang as Sir Douglas Rolls
- Margaret Bannerman as Laura Locke
- Arthur Margetson as Leslie Locke
- Richard Bird as Eric Hammond
- Sam Livesey as Sir Henry Linguard
- Frank Atkinson as Pope
- Hal Gordon as Percival Brown
- Kathleen Harrison as Agnes Carter, Locke's maid
- Robert Horton as Doctor Hackett
- Alec Fraser as Grainger
- Jeanne Stuart as Phyllis Ware
- J. Fisher White as Judge
- Laurence Hanray as Parker
- O. B. Clarence as Mr. Hammond
- Mary Jerrold as Mrs. Hammond
- Jimmy Godden as Inspector Holmes

== Reception ==
Kine Weekly wrote: "Thomas Bentley has handled the picture, which is necessarily very fully dialogued, neatly and effectively. Detail work is good and contributes to an atmosphere which is completely in harmony with the tragic story. The Old Bailey court sequences are easily the best that have beenput on the screen and are compelling in their realism and dramatic force."

The Daily Film Renter wrote: "Neat plot construction results in well-balanced piece of melodrama, realistic court-room interludes providing strong climax. Humour is much to fore, emanating from acid passages between Judge and Counsel. Matheson Lang gives fine showing in lead, being perfectly cast as legal light. Judicial procedure and ceremony is interestingly put over."
