= George Schick =

Czech-American conductor, vocal coach, accompanist and music educator

George Schick (born Jiří Šik; September 28, 1908 – March 7, 1985) was a Czech-American conductor, vocal coach, accompanist and music educator. He served as accompanist for Richard Tauber on his 1946–1947 tour of North, Central and South America, also for Elizabeth Schumann, including what proved to be some of her last recordings in New York in 1950. He is particularly remembered for his work as an opera conductor, notably serving on the conducting staffs of the Metropolitan Opera and the Prague State Opera. He spent the latter years of his career serving as the President of the Manhattan School of Music from 1969 to 1976.

== Life and career ==
Born in Prague and trained at the Prague Conservatory, Schick began his career as an assistant conductor at the Prague State Opera from 1927 to 1938. He left there to take a conducting post at the Royal Opera, London in 1939.

In 1940, Schick emigrated to the United States and joined the United States Navy. After World War II, he conducted performances with the San Carlo Opera Company, the Internationale Opera Company, the Miami Opera Guild and the Little Symphony of Montreal during the 1940s. He was appointed by Rafael Kubelik to work with the Chicago Symphony Orchestra as an assistant conductor from 1950 until 1952, later also serving as an associate conductor from 1952 until 1956.

Schick relocated to New York City in 1956 to become coordinator of the NBC Opera Company. In 1958 he joined the conducting staff of the Metropolitan Opera, and remained with the Met for the next eleven years. He left the Metropolitan Opera in 1969 to become the President of the Manhattan School of Music, a post he held until his retirement in 1976.
