= Gertie Maude =

1937 play

- Written by: John Van Druten
- Original language: English
- Genre: Drama

Premiere
- Date premiered: 17 August 1937
- Place premiered: St Martin's Theatre

Gertie Maude is a dramatic play by the British writer John Van Druten. It is set before the First World War, the plot about a chorus girl who begins an affair with an upper-class man only to kill herself when he marries someone of his own class.

It ran for 62 performances at St Martin's Theatre in London's West End between 17 August and 9 October 1937. The cast included Carol Goodner, Griffith Jones, Jill Esmond and Sebastian Smith.

== Bibliography ==
- Wearing, J.P. The London Stage 1930-1939: A Calendar of Productions, Performers, and Personnel. Rowman & Littlefield, 2014.
