= Time Bomb (1953 film) =

1953 British film by Ted Tetzlaff

- Theatrical release poster
- Directed by: Ted Tetzlaff
- Written by: Kem Bennett
- Produced by: Richard Goldstone
- Starring: Glenn Ford; Anne Vernon; Maurice Denham
- Cinematography: Freddie Young
- Edited by: Frank Clarke; Robert Watts
- Music by: John Addison
- Production company: Metro-Goldwyn-Mayer British
- Distributed by: Metro-Goldwyn-Mayer
- Release dates: 5 February 1953 (London); 14 July 1953 (US)
- Running time: 73 minutes
- Country: United Kingdom
- Language: English
- Budget: $975,000
- Box office: $746,000

Time Bomb (U.S. title: Terror on a Train) is a 1953 British film noir thriller film directed by Ted Tetzlaff and starring Glenn Ford, Anne Vernon and Maurice Denham. It was produced by MGM at the company's Elstree Studios with sets designed by the art director Alfred Junge.

== Plot ==
In England in 1952, a freight train loaded with naval mines is destined for HM Dockyard, Portsmouth. As it passes through a Birmingham railyard at night, a man jumps off. After a scuffle with a railway constable, he escapes, but without the bag he was carrying. The constable, Charles Baron, examines the contents of the bag and realizes that the man is a saboteur. The police are alerted, and it is assumed that the man has rigged a bomb to set off the trainload of mines, timed to go off the next morning after arrival at the naval dockyard.

The saboteur eludes the police, so on the assumption that he will want to witness the aftermath of his handiwork, Constable Baron goes to Portsmouth to find him.

The authorities divert the freight train to an abandoned siding, and the neighbourhood is evacuated. The nearest bomb disposal expert is Peter Lyncort, a former army man who lives in Birmingham with his wife Janine--though that evening she has left him, intending to take the train to London.

At the station, Janine reconsiders. She returns home, and sets about trying to find Peter, unaware that he has been taken to the freight train by local railway security chief Jim Warrilow.

After an initial inspection of the train, Lyncort concludes that the bomb is inside one of the mines and proceeds to open each one for examination, assisted by Warrilow. They find the bomb and disable it shortly after dawn, by which time Constable Baron has nabbed the saboteur in Portsmouth and is bringing him to the train via helicopter.

Warrilow wants to question the saboteur, who is uncooperative. That changes when he is handcuffed to the train believing that the bomb has not been found. He agrees to talk, warning Warrilow that two delays are set to go off within minutes. As Lyncort probes for the second bomb, his wife arrives. With no time left to disarm it, he throws the bomb into a field where it explodes harmlessly. The emergency is over, and Peter and Janine are reconciled.

== Cast ==
- Glenn Ford as Major Peter Lyncort
- Anne Vernon as Janine Lyncort
- Maurice Denham as Jim Warrilow
- Harcourt Williams as vicar
- Victor Maddern as saboteur
- Harold Warrender as Sir Evelyn Jordan
- John Horsley as Constable Charles Baron
- Campbell Singer as Inspector Brannon
- Bill Fraser as Constable J. Reed
- Herbert C. Walton as Old Charlie
- Martin Wyldeck as Sergeant Collins
- Arthur Hambling as train driver
- Harry Locke as train fireman
- Frank Atkinson as guard
- Ernest Butcher as Martindale
- Peter Illing as Carlo
- Jack McNaughton as Briggs
- Robert Rietty as Mr. Hancock
- Amy Dalby as Sarah, Charlie's wife
- Jean Anderson as Matron
- Hilda Fenemore as Jimmy's mother
- Leslie Phillips as Police Sergeant
- Charlotte Mitchell as buffet waitress
- Jack May as pub patron
- Ada Reeve as old lady
- Jack MacGowran as bearded man in hostel
- Keith Pyott as train District Superintendent
- Edward Evans as policeman at station
- Arthur Mullard as policeman evacuating pub
- Laurence Naismith as ambulance man
- Russell Waters as ticket collector
- Sam Kydd as ticket inspector

== Reception ==
=== Box office ===
According to MGM records the film earned $346,000 in the US and Canada and $400,000 elsewhere, resulting in a loss of $517,000.

=== Critical ===
The Monthly Film Bulletin wrote: "This modest M.G.M. British production, a good deal of it photographed on location in the Midlands, is cleanly and competently directed by Ted Tetzlaff. That it is not particularly exciting is partly due to the fact that one knows the engineer will be successful in detecting the bomb, and partly because the footage has been padded out in an attempt to give psychological depth to the story ... the director is clearly unfamiliar with his locale, as the peculiar range of accents and minor characters testifies."

Kine Weekly wrote: "Sabotage melodrama, cast in the Seven Days to Noon mould. ... The main action takes place on a goods train, but tension is cunningly eased by human and humorous byplay without robbing the finale of punch. Capably acted by an Anglo-American cast and authentically staged it's certain to hold and thrill the crowd."

Variety wrote: "Entire effort is concentrated on making this a suspenseful meller but the director only partly achieves his object. ... Acting keeps to an adequte but not impressive standard. Glenn Ford plays the lead in somewhat stolid fashion and Anne Vernon, as his French wife, has very little scope. Maurice Denham gives a characteristically reliable performance and Victor Maddern is well cast as the saboteur."

Steve Chibnall and Brian McFarlane wrote that the film: "was a slickly made suspense thriller with a twist in the tail that really pointed the direction for British second features over the next decade. Its compact story, clear narrative trajectory, convincing location work and engaging central performance augmented with entertaining character studies, all provided a template for smaller British production outfits looking to give their films some international appeal."
