= Diana Napier =

English film actress (1905–1982)

Alice Mary Wolkowicka (née Ellis; formerly Mulcaster and Tauber; 31 January 1905 – 12 March 1982), known professionally as Diana Napier, was an English film actress. She appeared in British cinema during the 1930s and 1940s, often in comedic or light dramatic roles, and gained public attention through her marriage to the tenor Richard Tauber, with whom she occasionally appeared on screen. Napier featured in a number of popular films of the period, including Brewster's Millions (1935), Invitation to the Waltz (film) (1935), and Land Without Music (1936), which helped establish her as a familiar figure in British entertainment.

Following Tauber's death in 1948, Napier continued to work intermittently in film and theatre, while also managing aspects of his musical legacy. In her later years she largely withdrew from public life. She died in London in 1982 at the age of 77.

== Biography ==
Napier was the daughter of Major Dr. Alfred Pytches Blanchard Ellis, an ENT specialist and sometime army surgeon, and Alice Napier.

Napier's first husband was the actor G. H. Mulcaster whom she married in 1927 and later divorced. Her second was the Austrian tenor Richard Tauber (1891–1948), to whom she was married from 1936 until his death. Her third was the Polish artist Stanislaw Wolkowicki (1902–1965), whom she had met during the war while she worked for the Polish Red Cross and married in 1953. He died in 1965, and she was buried with him in the Churchyard of St Michael and All Angels, Sunningdale, Berkshire in 1982.

After a few years in repertory, she was offered a screen test by Alexander Korda, and made a few films before he dropped her. It was through Paul Stein she met her future husband Tauber. She appeared with him in three films made in 1935/36, the first of them, Heart's Desire, under Stein's direction. For five years, 1935 until 1940, she rented the Villa Capri at Elstree, where she lived with Tauber from the time of their marriage.

In April 1940 she joined the First Aid Nursing Yeomanry, and after basic training joined an Ambulance Unit in Scotland, where she cared for Polish Soldiers, eventually becoming an NCO in a Polish unit. She later joined the Polish Welfare Unit in London, early in 1945 she travelled to Holland with the Red Cross to care for Polish soldiers escaping from Germany, and after VE Day moved to Meppen in Germany, receiving a high commendation from General Klemens Rudnicki for her work on behalf of Polish Servicemen.

Shortly before Tauber's death, she set up an artist's studio in Beauchamp Place, which became the design and display company Diana Display Ltd. (later DNT Associates) based in Parsons Green, Fulham, London. She published a biography of her husband in 1949, a volume of autobiography (My Heart and I, 1959), and collaborated with Charles Castle on This was Richard Tauber, a book and a film issued in 1971 to mark what would have been Tauber's 80th birthday.

== Selected filmography ==
- The Farmer's Wife (1928, credited as Mollie Ellis)
- Her First Affaire (1932)
- Strange Evidence (1933)
- For Love of You (1933)
- The Private Life of Don Juan (1934)
- The Rise of Catherine the Great (1934)
- The Warren Case (1934)
- Royal Cavalcade (1935)
- Mimi (1935)
- Falling in Love (1935)
- Heart's Desire (1935)
- Pagliacci (1936)
- Land Without Music (1936)
- Bait (1950)

== In popular culture ==
In the 2021 mini-series A Very British Scandal, based upon the life of her friend Margaret Campbell, Duchess of Argyll, Napier was played by Camilla Rutherford.

== Sources ==
- Daniel O'Hara. Richard Tauber: An Illustrated Chronology richard-tauber.de; updated September 2022.[Now at https://www.richard-tauber.de]
- Diana Napier Tauber, Richard Tauber, Arts and Educational Publishers Ltd, Glasgow and London, 1949
- Diana Napier Tauber, My Heart and I, Evans Brothers, London, 1959
- Charles Castle (with Diana Napier Tauber), This was Richard Tauber, W H Allen, London and New York, 1971
