= Carol Goodner =

American actress (1904–2001)

- Born: Carol Marie Goodner; May 30, 1904; New York City, U.S.
- Died: November 29, 2001 (aged 97); Katonah, New York, U.S.
- Occupation: Actress
- Years active: 1929–1957

Carol Marie Goodner (May 30, 1904 – November 29, 2001) was an American actress who appeared mostly in British films and television.

== Career ==
Carol Goodner was born in New York City on May 30, 1904.

A toe dancer when she was only four years old, she continued to earn her living that way until she was nine, when she went to school. She achieved her first New York stage success in 1926 and the following year made her London debut in the stage play; The Butter and Egg Man at the Garrick Theatre. Her New York theater credits include creating the role of Lorraine Sheldon, loosely based on Gertrude Lawrence, in The Man Who Came to Dinner. In England, she appeared in her first film Those Who Love in 1929. In 1931, when in London, she was a friend of actress Kay Walsh and the girlfriend of actor Henry Wilcoxon. In 1937 she played the title role in John Van Druten's play Gertie Maude at St Martin's Theatre. Goodner returned to America at the outbreak of war in 1939. She appeared in theatre in New York, but made no more films, and retired in 1957.

== Personal life ==
Goodner married Thomas Marshall, a real estate man, in New York City on May 14, 1940. She married actor Frederic Hunter in New Orleans on January 30, 1949.

Goodner filed a voluntary petition of bankruptcy in federal court on July 27, 1944. Her filing indicated that she had $340 in assets and $2,793 in liabilities.

Goodner died on November 29, 2001, in Katonah, New York.

== Filmography ==
- Those Who Love (1929) - Anne
- The Ringer (1931) - Cora Ann Milton
- The Flying Squad (1932) - Ann Perryman
- There Goes the Bride (1932) - Cora
- Strange Evidence (1933) - Marie / Barbara Relf
- Leave It to Smith (1933) - Mary Linkley
- The Fire Raisers (1934) - Helen Vaughan
- Red Ensign (1934) - June MacKinnon
- What's in a Name? (1934) - Marta Radovic
- Mimi (1935) - Musette
- Royal Cavalcade (1935) - Tourist in Tower of London
- The Student's Romance (1935) - Veronika Laubenthaler
- Music Hath Charms (1935) - Mrs. Norbray
- La Vie parisienne/Parisian Life (1936) - Simone
- The Dominant Sex (1937) - Gwen Clayton
- The Frog (1937) - Lola Bassano
- A Royal Divorce (1938) - Mme. Tallien

== Bibliography ==
- Cox, David (2006). Ave Atque Vale - the story of the Vale Special. Berkshire: Martin Publications. ISBN 0-9553010-0-9.
