= Max Schach =

Hungarian film producer and journalist (1886–1957)

- Born: 2 May 1886; Čenta, Vojvodina; Austro-Hungarian Empire
- Died: 1957 (aged 70–71); London, England; United Kingdom
- Other name: Max Schacherl
- Occupations: Journalist; Producer
- Years active: 1929 - 1937 (producer)

Max Schach (1886–1957) was an Austro-Hungarian-born film producer. Schach is particularly associated with British cinema, where he was a leading figure in the boom of the mid-1930s.

== Life and career ==
Schach was born as Max Schacherl to a Jewish family in Čenta, then part of the Austro-Hungarian Empire. He worked in Germany for many years as a journalist, and was particularly noted as a theatre and later film critic. He became involved in the German film industry during the silent era, working in a variety of roles at UFA, Emelka and Universal Pictures' German subsidiary. He personally produced several films, including some directed by Karl Grune.

Schach emigrated to Britain in 1934 following the Nazi takeover in Berlin. In the wake of the international success of Alexander Korda's The Private Life of Henry VIII (1933) Schach secured financial backing from the City of London who wanted to invest in the growing British film industry. He oversaw a series of independent film companies which made large-budget productions aimed at international markets. Many of his films employed fellow European exiles from the Nazis, including Fritz Kortner and Richard Tauber and Karl Grune. Because of his lavish budgets Schach was able to attract figures away from more established film companies. While some of the films such as Abdul the Damned (1934) made money, a lot struggled to recover their large budgets.

By 1937 a slump hit the British industry which saw several companies go out of business. While Alexander Korda was widely blamed for his extravagance at Denham Studios, historian Rachael Low believes that Schach and his associates were more responsible. The series of production companies that Schach oversaw ceased making films, generally after only one or two releases. The failure of Schach's film empire led to a lengthy legal case, and he never made another film. He continued to live in Britain, and died in London in 1957.

== Selected filmography ==
- Waterloo (1929)
- The Chaste Coquette (1929)
- Abdul the Damned (1934)
- Koenigsmark (1935)
- Love in Exile (1936)
- When Knights Were Bold (1936)
- Pagliacci (1936)
- Southern Roses (1936)
- Public Nuisance No. 1 (1936)
- Love from a Stranger (1937)
- The Lilac Domino (1937)
- Second Best Bed (1938)

== Bibliography ==
- Low, Rachael. Filmmaking in 1930s Britain. George Allen & Unwin, 1985.
