= Heart's Desire (1935 film) =

- Sheet music tie-in
- Directed by: Paul L. Stein
- Written by: Roger Burford; Jack Davies; Bruno Frank; Clifford Grey; Lawrence du Garde Peach; Lioni Pickard
- Produced by: Walter C. Mycroft
- Starring: Richard Tauber; Leonora Corbett; Carl Harbord; Paul Graetz
- Cinematography: John C. Cox
- Edited by: Leslie Norman
- Music by: G.H. Clutsam
- Production company: British International Pictures
- Distributed by: Wardour Films
- Release date: August 1935
- Running time: 82 minutes
- Country: United Kingdom
- Language: English

Heart's Desire is a 1935 British musical drama film directed by Paul L. Stein and starring Richard Tauber, Leonora Corbett, Kathleen Kelly, Diana Napier and Frank Vosper. Its plot involves a young opera singer who is discovered in Vienna and brought to London where he rises to stardom. The film was made at Elstree Studios in April/May 1935, and had its charity premiere at the Regal Cinema, Marble Arch, London on 17 October that year. It was part of a cycle of British operetta films.

== Cast ==
- Richard Tauber as Karl August Franz Ludwig Josef Steidler
- Leonora Corbett as Frances Wilson
- Carl Harbord as Oliver Desmond
- Paul Graetz as Florian
- Kathleen Kelly as Anna
- George Graves as Granville Wilson
- C. Denier Warren as Ted Mayer
- Diana Napier as Diana Sheraton
- Frank Vosper as Van Straaten
- Viola Tree as Lady Bennington
- Hilda Campbell-Russell as Steidler's Maid

== Critical reception ==
In a contemporary review, The Sydney Morning Herald wrote "This plot makes few demands upon Mr Tauber as actor and enables the audience to enjoy his magnificent singing without much interruption...It would be impossible one imagines, for Mr Tauber to navigate his way through a film that was stronger dramatically than this one. A film in which he appears becomes a pleasant alternative to a series of his phonograph records. From this point of view the producers of 'Heart's Desire' have succeeded admirably."

== Bibliography ==
- Bock, Hans-Michael & Bergfelder, Tim. The Concise Cinegraph: Encyclopaedia of German Cinema. Berghahn Books, 2009.
