= Love in Exile (film) =

1936 film

- Directed by: Alfred L. Werker
- Written by: Gene Markey (novel); Ernest Betts; Roger Burford; Herman J. Mankiewicz
- Produced by: Max Schach
- Starring: Helen Vinson; Clive Brook; Mary Carlisle; Ronald Squire
- Cinematography: Otto Kanturek
- Edited by: Edward B. Jarvis
- Music by: Benjamin Frankel
- Production company: Capitol Film Corporation
- Distributed by: General Film Distributors
- Release date: 19 May 1936
- Running time: 78 mins
- Country: United Kingdom
- Language: English

Love in Exile is a 1936 British romantic adventure film directed by Alfred L. Werker and starring Helen Vinson, Clive Brook and Mary Carlisle.

== Plot ==
The film opens with the abdication of King Regis, orchestrated by powerful businessmen who exploit his romance with a commoner named Xandra, turning it into a global scandal. Blaming herself for the king's forced departure, Xandra retreats to Holland, convinced that removing herself from his life will lead to his restoration to the throne. Meanwhile, the king seeks solace in Cannes, embracing a carefree life on the Riviera as he mourns the loss of his kingdom, hoping Xandra will join him.

As time passes, Xandra becomes determined to undo the injustice. She persuades the man responsible for his dethronement to reconsider, advocating for the king's return to power. Xandra's efforts pay off, and Regis reclaims his throne, with Xandra by his side as the new queen.

== Production ==
The film was shot at Isleworth Studios in west London by the independent producer Max Schach. It was based on the novel His Majesty's Pajamas by Gene Markey. The film's art direction was by John Mead.

== Cast ==
- Helen Vinson as Countess Xandra St. Aurion
- Clive Brook as King Regis VI
- Mary Carlisle as Emily Stewart
- Ronald Squire as Paul
- Cecil Ramage as John Weston
- Will Fyffe as Doc Tate
- Tamara Desni as Tanya
- Edmund Breon as Baron Zarroy
- Henry Oscar as Dictator
- Barbara Everest as Anna

== Release ==
The film reportedly had a North American release around 15 November 1936.

== Bibliography ==
- Low, Rachael. Filmmaking in 1930s Britain. George Allen & Unwin, 1985.
- Wood, Linda. British Films, 1927–1939. British Film Institute, 1986.
