= Carmen (1931 film) =

1931 British film by Cecil Lewis

- Directed by: Cecil Lewis
- Written by: Cecil Lewis; Prosper Mérimée (novel)
- Produced by: Walter C. Mycroft
- Starring: Marguerite Namara; Lester Matthews; Mary Clare
- Production company: British International Pictures
- Distributed by: Wardour Films
- Release date: 30 October 1931
- Running time: 77 minutes
- Country: United Kingdom
- Language: English

Carmen (also known as Bizet's Carmen, Gipsy Blood, Gypsy Blood) is a 1931 British musical film directed by Cecil Lewis and starring Marguerite Namara, Thomas F. Burke and Lance Fairfax. It was written by Lewis from the 1845 novella Carmen by Prosper Mérimée, and is an adaptation of the opera Carmen by Georges Bizet. It was produced by British International Pictures, the country's leading company of the early sound era, and shot at the Elstree Studios near London.

== Cast ==
- Marguerite Namara as Carmen
- Thomas F. Burke as Don José
- Lance Fairfax as Escamillo
- Lester Matthews as Zuniga
- Mary Clare as factory girl
- Dennis Wyndham as Doncairo
- Lewin Mannering as innkeeper
- Hay Petrie as Remenado

== Reception ==
Kine Weekly wrote: "While this adaptation of Carmen is artificial and suffers through not deciding whether it means to be opera or just plain drama, the voices of the leads are very good. One could have done with more of the everpopular airs from the opera. ... While both Thomas Burke as Don Jose, and Lance Fairfax as the Toreador, sing well, neither is outstanding histrionically."

The Daily Film Renter wrote: "Ambitious talkie experiment with Bizet's opera, which, in spite of excellent mounting and music, suffers from insufficient editing and is somewhat burdened with the heavy operatic style."
