= Ungeküsst soll man nicht schlafen gehn =

1936 film

- Directed by: E. W. Emo
- Written by: Fritz Koselka
- Starring: Hans Moser; Heinz Rühmann; Theo Lingen
- Music by: Robert Stolz
- Release date: 27 February 1936 (Vienna)
- Country: Austria
- Language: German

Ungeküsst soll man nicht schlafen gehn (English: You Should Not Go to Sleep Unkissed) is a 1936 Austrian comedy film. The screenplay was written by Fritz Koselka, the title song was composed by Robert Stolz, and the film was directed by E. W. Emo. The film, shot in black and white, starred the three most popular German-speaking comedians of the time—Heinz Rühmann, Hans Moser, and Theo Lingen. The leading roles were played by Liane Haid and Annie Rosar.

== Plot ==
Celebrated singer and actress Edda Vivian (Haid), who has secretly married her lover, Prince Alba (Iván Petrovich), has arrived in Vienna as part of a promotional tour. Her manager, Toni Miller (Lingen), who is completely unaware of her married state and the husband she is hiding in her hotel suite, has arranged a publicity stunt—an auction to be held at a ball where Edda Vivian is supposed to give a kiss to the highest bidder, with the money to be given to charity.

At the same time Franz Angerer (Rühmann), a student of philology, arrives in Vienna, where he wants to attend a conference. He is put up by his Uncle Ferdinand (Karl Hellmer), who works as a butler for Direktor Wiesinger (Moser in rather an unusual role), the owner of a record company.

In the course of the action Angerer is mistaken for several other people, in particular Prince Alba. However, he only has eyes for Wiesinger's daughter, Dore (Susi Lanner). The happy ending consists in the real Prince Alba showing himself to the public together with his wife Edda Vivian, and in Franz Angerer, who by his wit has made her sign an exclusive contract with Wiesinger's company, becoming engaged to Dore.

== Cast ==
- Heinz Rühmann as Franz Angerer
- Liane Haid as Edda Vivian
- Theo Lingen as Toni Miller, a director
- Hans Moser as Wiesinger, a director
- Annie Rosar as Lydia as Wiesinger's wife
- Susi Lanner as Dorrit as Wiesinger's daughter
- Iván Petrovich as Prince Carlo Alba
- Karl Hellmer as Ferd. Unterleitner, Wiesinger's servant
