= The Warren Case =

1934 film directed by Walter Summers

- Directed by: Walter Summers
- Written by: Arnold Ridley (play); Walter Summers
- Produced by: Walter C. Mycroft
- Starring: Richard Bird; Nancy Burne; Diana Napier
- Cinematography: Jack Parker
- Edited by: Frank Cadman
- Production company: British International Pictures
- Distributed by: Pathé Pictures
- Release date: 8 March 1934
- Running time: 75 minutes
- Country: United Kingdom
- Language: English

The Warren Case (also known as Crime Reporter and Fleet Street Murder) is a 1934 British crime film directed by Walter Summers and starring Richard Bird, Nancy Burne and Diana Napier. It was written by Summers based on the play The Last Chance by Arnold Ridley, and was made as a quota quickie at Welwyn Studios by British International Pictures.

== Plot ==
Lewis Bevan is a bitter, war-scarred and unbalanced criminologist and reporter. When his newspaper's proprietor, Sir Richard Clavering, berates him for not writing sensational front-page stories, he decides to plan and perpetrate the perfect crime, for which he will provide suitabling exciting coverage. His plot implicates Hugh Warren, fiancé of Clavering's daughter Mary. When Warren is convicted, Mary persuades the police to re-examine the case, and Bevan is tricked into confessing.

== Cast ==
- Richard Bird as Louis Bevan
- Nancy Burne as May Clavering
- Diana Napier as Pauline Warren
- Edward Underdown as Hugh Waddon
- Iris Ashley as Elaine de Lisle
- A. Bromley Davenport as Sir Richard Clavering
- Barbara Everest
- Francis L. Sullivan

== Reception ==
Kine Weekly wrote: "This British crime drama is not without occasional imperfections, mainly technical, but in spite of these it is an exceedingly praiseworthy effort. The clever, ingenious story strikes out on original lines, and is played against newspaper backgrounds which promote interesting and colourful atmosphere. The direction reveals imagination, and the character drawing is flawless from the stars downwards."

The Daily Film Renter wrote: "Wealth of incident building up tense atmosphere and leading to thrilling climax. Newspaper background well presented, and Old Bailey setting especially effective. Richard Bird's acting on virile lines, with supporting players turning in adequate portrayals."
