= Under the Frozen Falls =

- Directed by: Darrell Catling
- Written by: Mary Cathcart Borer
- Screenplay by: Mary Cathcart Borer
- Story by: J H Martin Cross
- Produced by: Donald Wilson.
- Starring: Harold Warrender; Jacques Brown; Ray Jackson
- Cinematography: George Stretton
- Edited by: Frederick Wilson
- Music by: Mischa Spoliansky
- Production companies: Gate Studios, Borehamwood, Hertfordshire
- Distributed by: General Film Distributors (GFD)
- Release date: 21 March 1948 (London)
- Running time: 55 minutes
- Country: United Kingdom
- Language: English

Under the Frozen Falls is a 1948 British children's film directed by Darrell Catling and starring Harold Warrender, Jacques Brown and Ray Jackson.

The original screenplay was written by Mary Cathcart Borer as a film for children. It was later adapted as a book by J. H. Martin Cross.

The film was one of the four of David Rawnsley's films that used his "independent frame" technique, a form of back projection.

== Premise ==
A party of boys collect lead from a disused lead mine in Somerset, for model making. They become involved with the kidnappers of a distinguished scientist. Lost secret plans and misadventures with dynamite add a thrill to the story.

== Cast ==
- Harold Warrender as Mr. Carlington
- Jacques Brown as Professor Bell-Wrighton
- Ray Jackson as David Roseby
- Peter Scott as Bob
- Tony Richardson as Peter
- Claude Hulbert as Riley
- Ivan Brandt as Thompson
- Mary Kerridge as Mrs. Roseby
- Michael Dear as Jim
- Alexander Field as Keeper of Toyshop
