= Leslie Banks =

English actor (1890–1952)

Leslie Banks CBE
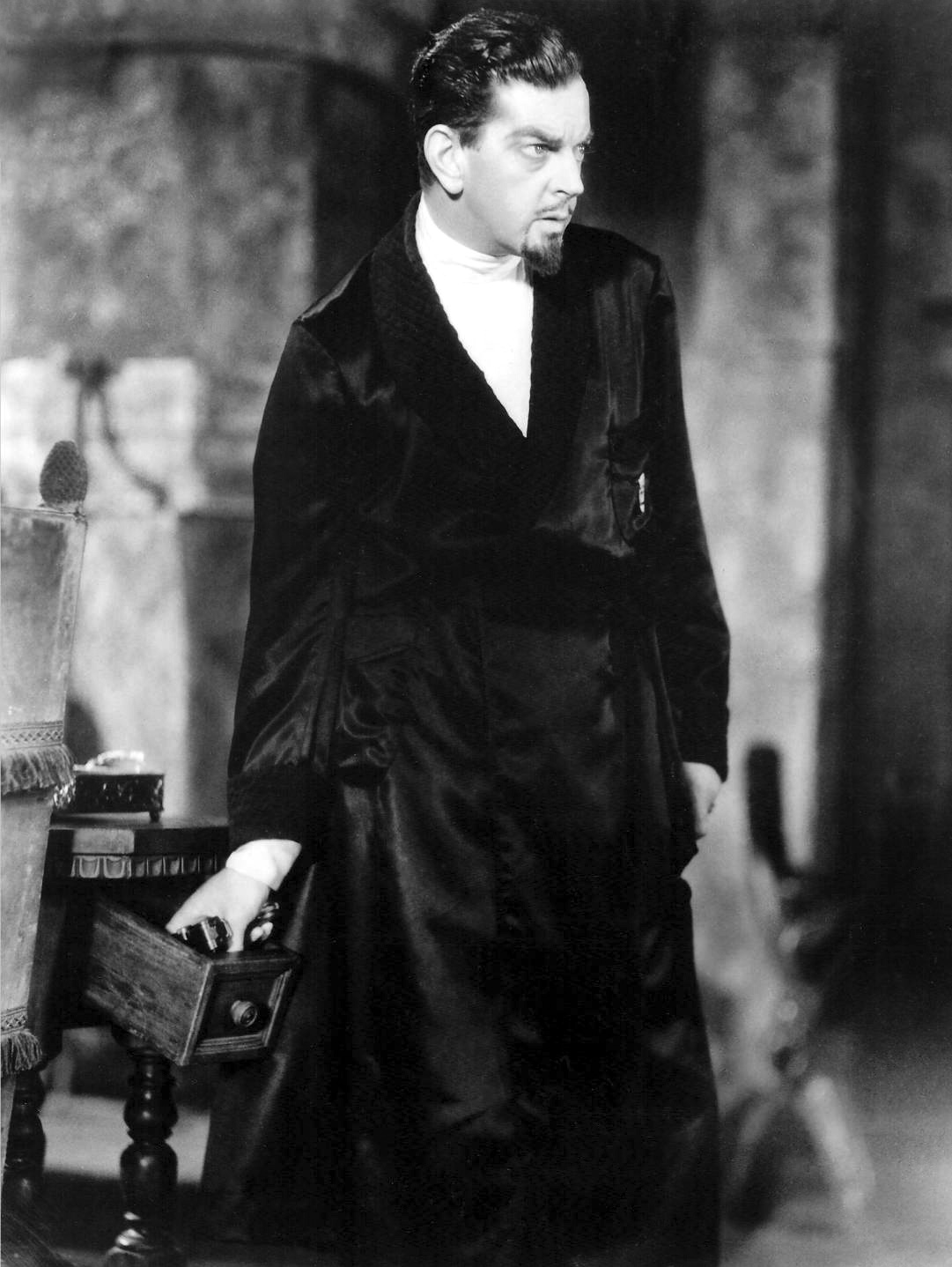
- Banks in The Most Dangerous Game (1932)
- Born: Leslie James Banks; 9 June 1890; West Derby, Liverpool, Lancashire, England
- Died: 21 April 1952 (aged 61); Kensington, London, England
- Occupations: Actor, director, producer
- Years active: 1911–1950
- Spouse: Gwendoline Haldane Unwin (m. 1915)
- Children: 3

Leslie James Banks (9 June 1890 – 21 April 1952) was an English stage and screen actor, director and producer, now best remembered as Count Zaroff in The Most Dangerous Game (1932) and the star of Alfred Hitchcock's original version of The Man Who Knew Too Much (1934).

== Early life and career ==
Leslie Banks was born in West Derby, Liverpool, Lancashire, to George and Emily (née Dalby) Banks. He attended school at Glenalmond College in Scotland, and later studied at Keble College, Oxford with the intention of becoming a parson, but decided against this.

He joined Frank Benson's company, and made his acting debut in October 1911 at the town hall in Brechin, playing Old Gobbo in The Merchant of Venice. He then toured the United States and Canada with Henry V. Esmond and Eva Moore in 1912 and 1913. Returning to London, he appeared for the first time on the West End stage at the Vaudeville Theatre on 5 May 1914, as Lord Murdon in The Dangerous Age.

During the First World War he served with the Essex Regiment. He received injuries that left his face partially scarred and paralysed. In his acting career he would use this injury to good effect, by showing the unblemished side of his face when playing comedy or romance and the scarred, paralysed side of his face when playing drama or tragedy. After the war, Banks joined the Birmingham Repertory Theatre. He returned to London in 1921, and established himself as a leading dramatic actor and West End star known for his powerful yet restrained performances.

Working in both London and New York City, he gained prominence on both sides of the Atlantic, and it was when he was in New York that Kenneth Macgowan persuaded him to go to Hollywood and make his first credited movie debut there in The Most Dangerous Game in 1932.

== Film career ==
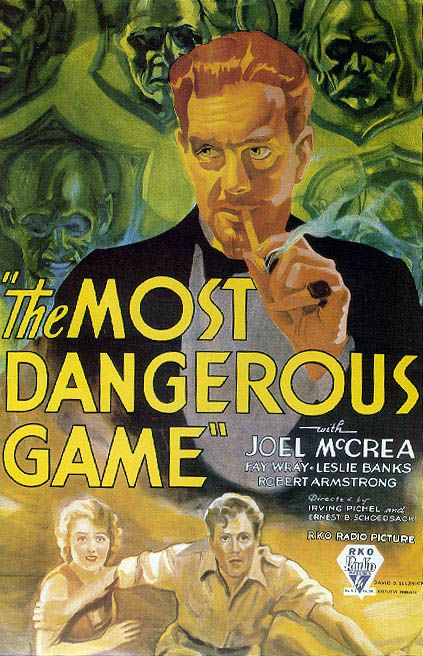
Theatrical release poster for The Most Dangerous Game (1932)

His intimidating aspect served him well in his Hollywood debut, as a diabolical Russian hunter of human prey in The Most Dangerous Game (1932). After two more Hollywood films he returned to Britain where he divided his time between film and theatre. His other film roles included Alfred Hitchcock's The Man Who Knew Too Much (1934), Sanders of the River (1935), Erich Pommer's Fire Over England (1937), Jamaica Inn (1939, for Hitchcock and Pommer again), The Arsenal Stadium Mystery (1939), Cottage to Let (1941), Went the Day Well (1942), Laurence Olivier's Henry V (1944), Michael Powell and Emeric Pressburger's The Small Back Room (1949) and David Lean's Madeleine (1950).

His theatre roles included Eliza Comes to Stay (his American debut in 1914), Captain Hook in Peter Pan (his New York debut in 1924), the title role in Clive of India (1934), Petruchio in The Taming of the Shrew (1937), the schoolmaster in Goodbye, Mr Chips (1938), and James Jarvis in the Kurt Weill musical Lost in the Stars (1950).

== Personal life ==
He married Gwendoline Haldane Unwin in 1915; they had three daughters, Daphne, Virginia, and Evangeline. Banks was appointed a Commander of the Order of the British Empire (CBE) for his services to theatre in 1950, the year of his last appearances on stage and screen. He died in 1952, aged 61, from a stroke he suffered while walking, and is buried in St Nicholas Churchyard in the village of Worth Matravers, Dorset.

== Filmography ==
Year	Title	Role	Notes
1921	Experience		(Film debut)
1932	The Most Dangerous Game	Count Zaroff	
1933	Strange Evidence	Francis Relf	
1933	I Am Suzanne	Adolpe 'Baron' Herring	
1934	The Fire Raisers	Jim Bronton	
1934	Red Ensign	David Barr	
1934	The Man Who Knew Too Much	Bob Lawrence	
1935	Sanders of the River	Commissioner R.G. Sanders	
1935	The Night of the Party	Sir John Holland	
1935	The Tunnel	Frederick Robbins	
1936	Debt of Honour	Maj. Jimmie Stanton	
1936	Three Maxims	Mac	
1937	Wings of the Morning	Lord Clontarf	
1937	Fire Over England	the Earl of Leicester	
1937	Farewell Again	Col. Harry Blair	
1939	Jamaica Inn	Joss Merlyn	
1939	The Arsenal Stadium Mystery	Inspector Anthony Slade	
1939	Sons of the Sea	Captain Hyde	
1940	21 Days	Keith	
1940	Dead Man's Shoes	Roger de Vetheuil	
1940	Busman's Honeymoon	Inspector Kirk	
1940	The Door with Seven Locks	Dr. Manetta	
1940	Neutral Port	George Carter	
1941	Cottage to Let	John Barrington	
1941	Ships with Wings	Vice-Admiral Weatherby	
1942	The Big Blockade	Civil Service: Taylor	
1942	Went the Day Well?	Oliver Wilsford	
1944	Henry V	Chorus	
1947	Mrs. Fitzherbert	Charles Fox	
1949	The Small Back Room	Col. A.K. Holland	
1950	Your Witness	Col. Roger Summerfield	
1950	Madeleine	James Smith	(final film)
