= Joyce Barbour =

English actress (1901–1977)

- Born: 27 March 1901; Birmingham, Warwickshire, England
- Died: 16 March 1977 (aged 75); Northwood, Middlesex, England
- Occupations: Film and Stage Actress
- Spouse: Richard Bird

Joyce Barbour (27 March 1901 – 16 March 1977) was an English actress. She was the wife of the actor Richard Bird.

Barbour was born in Birmingham on 27 March 1901 the daughter of Horace and Miriam Barbour, her father was an assurance clerk and later a hotel manager. She made her first stage appearance in Birmingham as a pantomime fairy in 1914. She first appeared on the London stage in 1915 at the Gaiety Theatre in the chorus. She appeared at the Duke of York's Theatre in December 1923 in London Calling!. She went to America in August 1924, and appeared on Broadway as Violet Dering in Havoc and Florence Horridge in Sky-High.

Her later theatre work included the original productions of Rodgers and Hart's Present Arms (1928), and Spring is Here (1929) on Broadway; and the musical Ever Green (1930) in the West End. She also played in the original production of Noël Coward's Words and Music at the Adelphi Theatre, London, in 1932. In September 1945 she took over as Madame Arcati in Blithe Spirit. At the Apollo Theatre in March 1949 she succeeded Margaret Rutherford as Miss Whitchurch in The Happiest Days of Your Life. In 1950 she appeared in Esther McCracken's Cry Liberty.

Barbour married the actor Richard Bird in 1931 in London. She died on 16 March 1977 in Hospital at Northwood, Middlesex, aged 75.

== Selected filmography ==
- Enchantment (1920) - Sophie Desmond
- Diamond Cut Diamond (1932)
- Sabotage (1936) - Renee
- For Valour (1937) - Barmaid
- Housemaster (1938) - Barbara Fane
- Saloon Bar (1940) - Sally
- Don't Take It to Heart (1944) - Harriet
- Stop Press Girl (1949) - Aunt Mab
- It Started in Paradise (1952) - Lady Burridge
- The Captain's Paradise (1953) - Mrs. Reid (housekeeper)
- The Main Chance (Edgar Wallace Mysteries )(1964) - Madame Rozanne

== Sources ==
- Herbert, Ian, ed. (1972). Who's Who in the Theatre (fifteenth ed.). London: Sir Isaac Pitman and Sons. ISBN 978-0-273-31528-5.
