= The Silver Darlings =

- Directed by: Clarence Elder
- Written by: Clarence Elder
- Based on: the novel by Neil M Gunn
- Starring: Clifford Evans; Helen Shingler
- Cinematography: Francis Carver
- Edited by: Max Brenner
- Music by: Clifton Parker
- Production company: ABPC
- Release date: 3 September 1947
- Running time: 84 minutes
- Country: United Kingdom
- Language: English
- Budget: £94,731
- Box office: £104,804 (UK)

The Silver Darlings is a 1947 British film directed by Clarance Elder and starring Clifford Evans and Helen Shingler. It was written by Elder based on the 1941 novel of the same title by Neil M. Gunn.

== Plot ==
The film is set in the early 19th century, after the Highland Clearances. Catrine and her family, like many other dispossessed Scots, turn their hands to fishing for herring, the "silver darlings" of the title. Catrine's husband is pressganged into the Royal Navy and dies at sea. Catrine is left widowed with a young son to raise.

After some time Roddy proposes to Catrine, but her son Finn, now older, is upset about the engagement. The fishermen are still trying to avoid conscription into the Royal Navy.

== Cast ==
- Clifford Evans as Roddy
- Helen Shingler as Catrine
- Carl Bernard as Angus
- Norman Shelley as Hendry
- Simon Lack as Don
- Norman Williams as Tormad
- Murdo Morrison as Finn (adult)
- Josephine Stewart as Una (adult)
- Hugh Griffith as Packman
- Carole Lesley as Una (child)
- Christoper Capon as Finn (child)
- Stanley Jay as Bo'sun
- Harry Fine as Lieutenant
- Iris Vandeleur as Kirsty
- Jean Shepherd as Mrs Hendry
- Bennett O'Loghlin as Callum
- Jack Faint as Skipper Bremner
- Wilfred Caithness as first crofter
- Michael Martin-Harvey as second crofter
- Anne Allan as Meg
- Phema Clyne as Marie
- Peter Illing as Foreign Buyer
- Roddy Hughes as shoemaker
- Hamilton Deane as professor
- Kenneth Warrington as doctor
- Phyllis Morris as Tormad's mother

== Reception ==
=== Box office ===
As of 1 April 1950 the film had earned distributor's gross receipts of £33,783 in the UK, of which £21,836 went to the producer. The film made a loss of £72,895.

=== Critical ===
The Monthly Film Bulletin wrote: "The photography is excellent and shows to full advantage the forbidding bleakness of the land and the wild beauty of the sea. The acting is generally efficient enough, although occasionally it is slightly stilted. Direction makes the most of a dramatic situation arising from a dangerous cliff climb, a rescue from the sea and from incidents in a cholera epidemic. This is a refreshing film of an unusual and well-treated subject."

Kine Weekly wrote: "It's a stickler for atmosphere, but authentic detail and environment fail to cloak a dishevelled central theme or its novelettish romantic interest. Badly overcrowded and carelessly cut, it's not, we fear, the masses' 'cup of tea'. ... The story is at one and the same time an indictment of the grasping early nineteenth-century Scottish landlords, a tribute to the brave and patient wives of the stalwart fishermen, a pat on the back for the men themselves, and an outline of the northern herring industry, but its canvas is far too unwieldy to make strong or popular dramatic entertainment. Pictorially impressive, it needs the scissors to bring out its full flavour."

Picturegoer wrote: "The story around which this development is written is poor and novelettish. It is actually not worthy of its theme. Pictorially the picture is good but the industry one feels deserves something more impressive than it has been given. Acting is generally more theatrical than real."

Picture Show wrote: "Rather slow-moving drama of life the sombre, rugged Hebrides. It is sincerely told, and includes some superbly beautiful land and seascapes."

In The Radio Times Guide to Films Allen Eyles gave the film 2/5 stars, writing: "This Scottish enterprise was a work of love, made over a two year span by writer/director Clarence Elder in collaboration with actor and associate director Clifford Evans. A pity, then, that the location footage overwhelms the narrative and is too often back-projected behind actors in the studio. Evans's Welsh accent and Helen Shingler's English one are a hindrance to cultivating an authentic tone."
