= Helen Shingler =

English actress (1919–2019)

- Born: 29 August 1919; London, England
- Died: 8 October 2019 (aged 100); Somerset, England
- Occupation: Actress
- Years active: 1940–1985
- Spouse: Seafield Head (m. 1944; died 2009)
- Children: Murray Head; Anthony Head
- Relatives: Emily Head (granddaughter); Daisy Head (granddaughter)

Helen Shingler (29 August 1919 – 8 October 2019) was an English film and television actress.

== Biography ==
Shingler was born on 29 August 1919. She married producer Seafield Head, and was the mother of actor and singer Murray Head and actor Anthony Head; her granddaughters include actresses Emily and Daisy Head. Her television roles include Madame Maigret in the BBC Television series Maigret (1960–63), in which Rupert Davies played the eponymous French detective. She died in October 2019, five weeks after celebrating her 100th birthday.

== Selected filmography ==
- Quiet Weekend (1946)
- The Silver Darlings (1947)
- The Long Mirror (TV film, 1948)
- The Rossiter Case (1951)
- The Lady with a Lamp (1951)
- Judgment Deferred (1952)
- Love's a Luxury (1952)
- Laughing Anne (1953)
- Background (1953)
- Room in the House (1955)
- Rx Murder (1958)
- Television Playwright (TV series, 1958) 2 episodes
