= George H. Clutsam =

Australian pianist, composer and writer

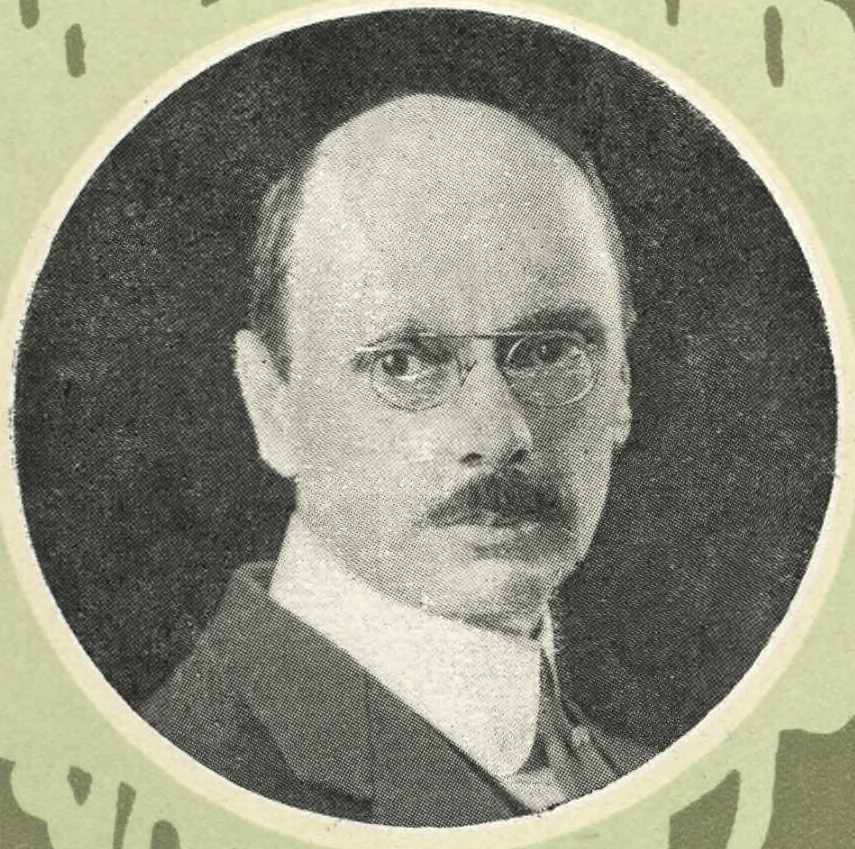
ca. 1919 portrait of Clutsam

George Howard Clutsam (26 September 1866 – 17 November 1951) was an Australian pianist, composer and writer, best remembered as the arranger of Lilac Time. Clutsam published over 150 songs.

== Life ==
Clutsam was born in Sydney, New South Wales, Australia. His career began as a pianist, at which he had little formal training. After establishing himself in Australia and New Zealand, he moved to London in 1889, where he continued as an accompanist to various artists including fellow Australian Nellie Melba in 1893. From 1895 he increasingly moved to arrangement and composition of orchestral works and light opera.

From 1888, Clutsam frequently shared the stage as pianist with Australian singer Minna Fischer, who was married to Herbert Flemming but separated with two sons. They were also paired or made a threesome with Amy Sherwin at social occasions such as the Crossley–Muecke wedding. Clutsam and Fischer married quietly on 12 December 1908, two months after the death of Flemming.

Between 1908 and 1918 he wrote music criticism for The Observer and "The Musical Times", while continuing to compose and arrange. In 1912, he wrote a biography of Franz Schubert. Aside from his many stage works, he wrote numerous songs, including the popular "Ma Curly-Headed Babby". Later he became Vice-Chairman of the Performing Right Society. He also wrote music for the silent cinema and subsequently also composed for the "talkies".

Clutsam published under a number of pseudonyms, namely Paul Aubry, Robert Harrington, H.S. Iseledon, Georges Latour and Ch.G. Mustal. His brother, Fred Clutsam (1869–1934), was a pianist described as George Marshall-Hall's prize pupil, an inventor and the conductor of Melbourne's Orpheus Society.

He died in London in 1951 at the age of 85.

== Selected musicals and other works ==
- Carnival Scenes (1895; orchestral work)
- The Queen's Jester (1904 opera)
- The Fool's Cap (1906 opera)
- A Summer Night (1910; opera)
- King Harlequin (1912; opera/masque)
- Carmen Ballet (1912; Alhambra Theatre, based on Bizet music)
- Young England (1916 musical)
- A Southern Maid (1920; contributed additional music)
- 101 original studies for the pianoforte (1920)
- The Green Lanes of England (1920; orchestral suite)
- Gabrielle (1921 musical, co-written with Archibald Joyce)
- The Little Duchess (1922 play with music)
- Lilac Time (1922 arrangement of Franz Schubert's music)
- The Damask Rose (1929; play with arrangements of Chopin music)
- Lavender (1930 musical)
- Barbara; or, The Broken Sixpence (1932 comic opera)
- Mimi (1935; film score with arrangements from Puccini's La bohème)
- Heart's Desire (1935; film score)
- Three Plantation Sketches (orchestral work)
- Plantation Songs

== Sources ==
- "George Clutsam", Australian Variety Theatre Archive, accessed 19 January 2014
- Scowcroft, Philip L. "G. H. Clutsam", Classical Music on the Web, MusicWeb International (2001), accessed 19 January 2014
- Skinner, Graeme. "George Clutsam, 'Our only Australian Composer'", Graeme Skinner: Musicologist – Writer – Researcher, 3 February 2012, accessed 19 January 2014
- "Clutsam the Composer", The Register, Adelaide, NLA.gov, 9 May 1914, p. 15, accessed 19 January 2014
- "George H. Clutsam", AustLit: The Australian Literature Resource (subscription service), accessed 19 January 2014
- "Chopin Music on the Stage: Mr. Clutsam's new opera", The Advertiser, Adelaide, 24 June 1929, p. 13, accessed 19 January 2014
