= What Happened Then? =

1934 film directed by Walter Summers

- Directed by: Walter Summers
- Written by: Lillian Trimble Bradley (play); Walter Summers
- Produced by: Walter C. Mycroft
- Starring: Richard Bird; Lorna Hubbard; Geoffrey Wardwell
- Cinematography: James Wilson
- Edited by: Edward B. Jarvis
- Production company: British International Pictures
- Distributed by: Wardour Films
- Release date: 25 September 1934
- Running time: 62 minutes
- Country: United Kingdom
- Language: English

What Happened Then? is a 1934 British crime film directed by Walter Summers and starring Richard Bird, Lorna Hubbard and Geoffrey Wardwell. It was written by Summers, adapted from the play by Lilian Trimble Bradley, and was made as a quota quickie at Welwyn Studios.

== Plot ==
When William Wadsworth is murdered, his adopted son Raymond is arrested, found guilty on the basis of circumstantial fingerprint evidencde, and sentenced to death. His best friend, Peter, proposes to Raymond's sweetheart, Alicia, who, in desperation, agrees to marry him if he can find new evidence to prove Raymond's innocence. When the family's doctor is murdered, and Raymond's fingerprints are found at the crime scene, it is revealed that Peter is a madman, and in order to frame Raymond for the murders had taken casts of Raymond's fingerprints.

== Cast ==
- Richard Bird as Peter Bromley
- Lorna Hubbard as Alicia Altherton
- Geoffrey Wardwell as Raymond Rudford
- Francis L. Sullivan as Richard Bentley, Prosecution Counsel
- Richard Gray as Robert
- George Zucco as Inspector Hull
- Quentin McPhearson as Kirkland
- Laurence Hanray as Dr. Bristol
- Stella Arbenina as Mrs. Bromley
- Cecil Ramage as Defence
- J. Fisher White as Judge
- Alec Finter
- Kathleen Harrison as a housemaid
- Raymond Huntley as James Cookson, the butler

== Reception ==
Kine Weekly wrote: "Richard Bird gives a studied portrayal of the unfortunate murderer whose clever schemings emanate from an unbalanced mind, his final confession being a fine piece of work. Francis L. Sullivan plays the role of prosecuting attorney with rare polish, and Cecil Ramage is an excellent defending counsel."

The Daily Film Renter wrote: "Presented with commendable dramatic economy, the story is ingeniously unfolded, working up to a strong climax. The Old Bailey episode is a gem, put over with great fidelity to the real thing, counsel's clashes providing humour to lighten the sombreness of the occasion, Despite the fact that there is an abundance of dialogue (a legacy from the piece's stage origin), action is plentiful."
