= Fritz Koselka =

Austrian screenwriter and writer (1905–1978)

Fritz Koselka (24 July 1905 Graz in Austria Hungary – 1978) was an Austrian screenwriter and writer. He was involved in writing of about 15 films between 1936 and 1952.

He is possibly best known for his writing of the major Austrian film comedy Ungeküsst soll man nicht schlafen gehn released in 1936

== Selected filmography ==
- Land Without Music (1936)
- Anton the Last (1939)
- My Daughter Lives in Vienna (1940)
- Love is Duty Free (1941)
- To Be God One Time (1942)
- Dance Into Happiness (1951)
- Irene in Trouble (1953)
