= Mimi (1935 film) =

1935 film

- Directed by: Paul L. Stein
- Written by: Jack Davis Jr.; Clifford Grey; Paul Merzbach; Denis Waldock
- Based on: La Vie de Bohème by Henri Murger
- Produced by: Walter C. Mycroft
- Starring: Douglas Fairbanks Jr.; Gertrude Lawrence; Diana Napier
- Cinematography: Jack E. Cox
- Edited by: Leslie Norman
- Music by: George H. Clutsam
- Production company: British International Pictures
- Distributed by: Wardour Films
- Release date: 29 March 1935
- Running time: 94 minutes
- Country: United Kingdom
- Language: English

Mimi is a 1935 British romance film directed by Paul L. Stein and starring Douglas Fairbanks Jr., Gertrude Lawrence and Diana Napier. Set in nineteenth century Paris, the screenplay concerns a composer who becomes inspired by a young woman he encounters. The film is based on the 1851 novel La Vie de Bohème by Henri Murger. The score includes arrangements of Giacomo Puccini's music from the opera La bohème, arranged by George H. Clutsam.

The film was made at Elstree Studios, with sets designed by the art director Cedric Dawe.

== Cast ==
- Douglas Fairbanks Jr. as Rodolphe
- Gertrude Lawrence as Mimi
- Diana Napier as Madame Sidonie
- Harold Warrender as Marcel
- Carol Goodner as Musette
- Richard Bird as Colline
- Martin Walker as Schaunard
- Austin Trevor as Lamotte
- Laurence Hanray as Barbemouche
- Paul Graetz as Durand
- Jack Raine as Duke

== Reception ==
Writing for The Spectator, Graham Greene described the film as evoking a "happy juvenility" and attributed its success to the superior acting skills of Fairbanks and Lawrence, and to the wardrobe designed by Doris Zinkeisen.

British International admitted this film and Drake of England lost money even though they cost less than $500,000.

== Bibliography ==
- Low, Rachael. Filmmaking in 1930s Britain. George Allen & Unwin, 1985.
- Wood, Linda. British Films, 1927-1939. British Film Institute, 1986.
