= Richard Bird (actor) =

English actor and director (1895–1979)

- Richard Bird
- Born: George Bird; 4 April 1895; Liverpool, Lancashire, England
- Died: December 1979 (aged 84); Northwood, Middlesex, England
- Spouse: Joyce Barbour

Richard Bird (4 April 1895 – December 1979) was an English actor and director of stage and screen. Born George, Bird took the stage name Richard Bird after being nicknamed "Dickie" by his theatre colleagues.

After working in a newspaper office for a year he made his stage debut as a member of the Liverpool Repertory Company in 1917. He went on to appear on both the London and American stage, making his film debut in some silent shorts during 1919.

He appeared in films throughout the 1930s and 1940s, playing the lead roles in quota quickies The Warren Case and What Happened Then? (both 1934). His film roles of the 1930s tended towards melodrama, such as the jealous Ernest in Maurice Elvey's The Water Gipsies (1932), and the murderous Eric opposite Matheson Lang in The Great Defender (1934). Middle-age saw his characters become more affable and his later films showcase his ability at light comedy, such as the sleepy Inspector Sneed in The Door with Seven Locks (1940); the dual role of bumbling Arthur and the Ghost in Don't Take It to Heart (1944); and the dog-obsessed Jennings in Forbidden (1949). He was a surprise romantic lead in I'll Walk Beside You (1943), and had probably his most high profile role in the ensemble cast of Ealing's supernatural drama The Halfway House (1944). He continued acting into the 1950s and 1960s, mainly in television series such as Ivanhoe, Probation Officer and Public Eye, as well as small roles in a couple of Anglo-Amalgamated's Edgar Wallace Mysteries films.

He directed the 1938 film version of Edgar Wallace's The Terror, as well as the 1943 stage adaptation of Graham Greene's Brighton Rock at the Garrick Theatre, London. Two of the cast members in the production, Richard Attenborough and Hermione Baddeley, reprised their roles in the Boulting brothers' acclaimed film version of 1947.

In 1931 Bird married stage actress Joyce Barbour in London. He died in Northwood, Middlesex in 1979 aged 84.

== Filmography ==
- Tilly of Bloomsbury (1931)
- Number, Please (1931)
- The Professional Guest (1931)
- Impromptu (1932)
- A Letter of Warning (1932)
- White Face (1932)
- The Water Gipsies (1932)
- Nine till Six (1932)
- The Right to Live (1933)
- The Warren Case (1934)
- The Great Defender (1934)
- What Happened Then? (1934)
- The Crouching Beast (1935)
- Invitation to the Waltz (1935)
- Mimi (1935)
- Royal Cavalcade (1935)
- Night Mail (1935)
- Sensation (1936)
- Bulldog Drummond at Bay (1937)
- The Door with Seven Locks (1940)
- I'll Walk Beside You (1943)
- Don't Take It to Heart (1944)
- The Halfway House (1944)
- Forbidden (1949)
- Edgar Wallace Mysteries - Death Trap (1962)
- Edgar Wallace Mysteries - Return to Sender

== Selected stage credits ==
- The Combined Maze by Frank Vosper (1927)
- The Composite Man by Ronald Jeans (1936)
- Love in a Mist by Kenneth Horne (1941)
- Lady from Edinburgh by Aimée Stuart (1945)
- My Friend Lester by Alec Coppel (1947)
- The French Mistress by Sonnie Hale (1955)
