= Laurence Hanray =

British actor (1874–1947)

- Born: Lawrence Henry Jacobs; 16 May 1874; Hampstead, London, United Kingdom
- Died: 28 November 1947 (aged 73); Marylebone, London, United Kingdom
- Occupation: Actor
- Years active: 1923–1947 (film)

Laurence Hanray (né Lawrence Henry Jacobs; 16 May 1874 – 28 November 1947), sometimes credited as Lawrence Hanray, was a British film and theatre actor born in London, England. He is also credited as the author of several plays and music hall songs.

Laurence Hanray was born Lawrence Henry Jacobs in St John's Wood on 16 May 1874, the son of Angelo Jacobs (c. 1851–1910), a glass manufacturer, and Leah (née Nathan; 1850/1851–1946).

His father changed his name to Angelo Jacobs Hanray, and with it the family name, after becoming bankrupt in 1897, although Laurence had been using the name Hanray professionally from at least 1892, when he appeared as a member of the Hermann Vezin Theatre Company in supporting roles in Hamlet and Macbeth at Her Majesty's Theatre, Dundee.

Australian newspapers show he was in Australia and New Zealand from around 1901–04, appearing as Carraway Bones the undertaker in the farce Turned Up at the Theatre Royal, Perth, in May 1901, and subsequently at most of the main cities until June 1904. Travel records show him departing Sydney for Auckland in August 1901, and sailing from Sydney for London on 7 October 1904. He then resumed touring in Britain. In the 1911 census, Laurence Hanray (36), actor, is listed as residing at the Woolton Hall Hydropathic Hotel, Much Woolton, Lancashire, England.

Hanray married Dorothy Mary Chambers Farnsworth (1884–1918) in the Birkenhead district during the first quarter of 1914. She petitioned for divorce in 1917, but then died suddenly in London on 16 August 1918. Hanray married Lois Grace Heatherley (1892–1966) in Paddington during the same quarter his first wife died. Lois was also an actress and performed with Laurence at the Booth Theatre, Broadway, in 1921. They were also together in The Faithful Heart, she as Ginger and Laurence as Major Lestrade, at the Comedy Theatre, Haymarket. Travel records then show the couple arriving in New York in September 1922. He appeared in John Galsworthy's play Loyalties at the Gaiety Theatre on Broadway. They arrived in Liverpool in May 1923. The couple also played together in Escape at the Booth Theatre, Broadway in 1927, she as Miss Grace and he in multiple roles (the Fellow Convict, the Old Gentleman and the Farmer).

Laurence and Lois had a daughter, Ursula Susan Edith Hanray, on 16 November 1923. According to travel records, the family visited America from September 1927. Laurence also went on his own to Canada in September 1931, and also during 1939–1940. Ursula became a child actress, playing the title role in the first televised production of Alice Through The Looking Glass in 1937, and the young Queen Victoria in a London theatre in 1940.

Hanray worked almost up to his death; The Times reported in early September 1947 that he was to appear in a play at Dunfermline Abbey Theatre. He died at age 73 on 28 November 1947, following an operation at the Middlesex Hospital, London. Lois Grace Hanray died aged 74 on 25 April 1966.

== Partial filmography ==
- The Pipes of Pan (1923) – James Flaxman
- Beyond the Cities (1930) – Gregory Hayes
- Her Reputation (1931) – Mr. Montgomery
- The Faithful Heart (1932) – Major Ango
- Love on Wheels (1932) – Gallop's Commissionaire (uncredited)
- That Night in London (1932) – Ribbles
- Wedding Rehearsal (1932) – News editor
- Leap Year (1932) – Hope
- There Goes the Bride (1932) – Police Chief (uncredited)
- The Good Companions (1933) – Mr. James Tarvin
- Loyalties (1933) – Jacob Twisden
- His Grace Gives Notice (1933) – Mr. Grayling
- This Week of Grace (1933) – Lawyer Cowlbe
- The Private Life of Henry VIII (1933) – Archbishop Cranmer
- The Man from Toronto (1933) – Duncan
- The Rise of Catherine the Great (1934) – Goudovitch
- Those Were the Days (1934) – Wormington
- Chu Chin Chow (1934) – Kasim Baba
- The Great Defender (1934) – Parker
- Easy Money (1934) – Mr. Pim
- What Happened Then? (1934) – Dr. Bristol
- Lorna Doone (1934) – Parson Bowden
- The Scarlet Pimpernel (1934) – Burke (uncredited)
- Murder at Monte Carlo (1935) – Collum
- Brewster's Millions (1935) – Grant
- Street Song (1935) – Tuttle
- Mimi (1935) – Barbemouche
- Escape Me Never (1935) – (uncredited)
- Adventure Ltd. (1935) – Simon Ledbury
- Drake of England (1935) – (uncredited)
- Expert's Opinion (1935) – Coroner
- Whom the Gods Love (1936) – Archbishop of Salzburg
- Beloved Imposter (1936) – Arthur
- Someone at the Door (1936) – Poole
- The Man Who Could Work Miracles (1936) – Mr. Bamfylde
- Lonely Road (1936) – Jenkinson
- As You Like It (1936) – Third Lord (uncredited)
- Rembrandt (1936) – Heertsbeeke
- Three Maxims (1936) – Thomas
- Fire Over England (1937) – French Ambassador
- Action for Slander (1937) – Clerk of Court
- Dark Journey (1937) – Cottin
- Moonlight Sonata (1937) – Mr. Bishop
- The Show Goes On (1937) – Waiter (uncredited)
- Knights for a Day (1937) – (uncredited)
- It's Never Too Late to Mend (1937) – Lawyer Crawley
- Knight Without Armour (1937) – Forrester
- Midnight Menace (1937) – Sir George, Lead Conspirator
- The Girl in the Taxi (1937) – Charencey
- Smash and Grab (1937) – Praskins
- The Last Chance (1937) – Mr. Perrin
- A Royal Divorce (1938) – Klemens von Metternich
- The Missing People (1939)
- 21 Days (1940) – Solicitor
- The Ghost of St. Michael's (1941) – Clerk of Court (uncredited)
- Quiet Wedding (1941) – Mr. Williamson (uncredited)
- Old Mother Riley's Circus (1941) – Cheddar, KC
- Penn of Pennsylvania (1942) – (uncredited)
- Hatter's Castle (1942) – Dr. Lawrie
- Let the People Sing (1942) – (uncredited)
- My Learned Friend (1943) – Sir Norman
- On Approval (1944) – Parkes
- Hotel Reserve (1944) – Police Commissioner
- Love Story (1944) – Angus Rossiter
- Waterloo Road (1945) – Traveller to Basingstoke (uncredited)
- The Life and Adventures of Nicholas Nickleby (1947) – Mr. Gride
- Mine Own Executioner (1947) – Dr. Lefage (final film role)
