= Don't Take It to Heart =

1944 British film by Jeffrey Dell

- Directed by: Jeffrey Dell
- Written by: Jeffrey Dell
- Produced by: Sydney Box
- Starring: Richard Greene; Alfred Drayton; Patricia Medina; Moore Marriott; Richard Bird; Edward Rigby; Brefni O'Rorke; Wylie Watson
- Cinematography: Eric Cross
- Edited by: Frederick Wilson
- Music by: Mischa Spoliansky
- Production company: Two Cities Films
- Distributed by: General Film Distributors
- Release date: 30 November 1944
- Running time: 90 minutes
- Country: United Kingdom
- Language: English

Don't Take It to Heart is a 1944 British comedy film directed and written by Jeffrey Dell and starring Richard Greene, Alfred Drayton, Patricia Medina, Moore Marriott and Richard Bird.

== Plot ==
When the ancient castle of the earls of Chaunduyt (pronounced "Condit") is damaged by German bombing during the Second World War, an ancient ghost is released from a chest hidden in an old wall. He is sighted by the butler Alfred Bucket and the maid when they come to inspect the damage, and he becomes front page news. Lawyer Peter Hayward joins a tour of the somewhat decrepit castle (conducted by the poverty-stricken, but unconcerned Lord Chaunduyt, incognito), and admires portraits of a young woman, who turns out to be Lady Mary, the present lord's daughter.

When Peter comes to look at manuscripts that were also uncovered by the bombing, he is pleasantly surprised to find that his lordship has forgotten the appointment, but Lady Mary has returned home and can be persuaded to assist him. (She has socialist tendencies and is engaged to commoner George Bucket, much to her snobbish aunt's displeasure.) They spend much time together; after a week, Peter asks Mary if she was only trying to help sell the manuscripts. She admits it is important to her father, then tells him she has to go away the next day when he makes it clear he is attracted to her. When Peter asks when she found out, she tells him it was half a minute ago.

In the local pub, the ghost tries to engage a somewhat inebriated Peter to take on a case after Pike ploughs up a cricket pitch; over 400 years, his conscience has grown to bother him that he fenced in land that did not belong to him.

When Mary returns, she finds Peter still there. She then tells him that her fiance, whom she has seen only once briefly since they were children, is coming home from the war. Discouraged, Peter decides to leave. At the railway station, he learns that Pike has confiscated the land Harry used to operate a brickyard, probably out of spite for losing the case over the cricket grounds, and now people are saying that he is responsible. At a party, Mary inadvertently learns that George is engaged to someone else, which makes her distraught. However, she pulls herself together when Peter appears; she continues to discourage his romantic interest in her.

Meanwhile, Peter concocts a plan. He has some of the local residents move sheep onto the confiscated land. When Pike takes the matter to court, presided over by Lord Chaunduyt, Peter pleads not guilty for himself and all of the other defendants. Pike is represented by Sir Henry Wade and Patterson. Peter proceeds to contend that the recently discovered manuscripts prove the Lord Chaunduyt who enclosed the land originally was not in fact Lord Chaunduyt at all. Peter calls Dr. Rose of the British Museum as his first witness. He confirms the authenticity of the manuscripts and reads a paragraph which contains a deathbed confession that a man switched his child with the infant Lord Chaunduyt. Peter then asserts that the rightful earl is poacher Harry Bucket! Sir Henry demands that Peter produce a witness to the signature. The ghost unexpectedly appears, takes the witness stand and confirms that the signature is that of his father. The case is dismissed.

Harry is made Lord Chaunduyt by act of Parliament. Peter confesses to Mary that his aged father is a baronet and overcomes her outrage with a kiss. Meanwhile, the former earl enjoys himself by poaching.

== Cast ==
- Richard Greene as Peter Hayward
- Alfred Drayton as [Joseph] Pike
- Patricia Medina as Mary
- Moore Marriott as Granfer
- Richard Bird as Arthur [Chaunduyt] / the ghost
- Edward Rigby as Butler [Alfred Bucket]
- Brefni O'Rorke as Lord [Charles] Chaunduyt
- Wylie Watson as Harry Bucket
- Claude Dampier as Loopy
- Ernest Thesiger as Justices' Clerk
- Ronald Squire as music-lover
- Joyce Barbour as Harriet
- David Horne as Sir Henry [Wade]
- Joan Hickson as Mrs. Pike
- Claude Bailey as magistrate
- Ivor Barnard as bus driver
- Esma Cannon as maid
- Peter Cotes as Junior Counsel [Patterson]
- Patric Curwen as Smith
- Harry Fowler as telegraph boy
- Arthur Hambling as railway porter
- Ernest Jay as reporter [Tripp]
- Edie Martin as postmistress
- George Merritt as landlord
- John Salew as Dr. Rose, witness
- John Turnbull as Police Sergeant
- Amy Veness as Cook
- Margaret Withers as Mrs. Smith
- Eliot Makeham as Roberts
- Ian Wilson as reporter in court

== Production ==
The film was made at Riverside Studios, Hammersmith in London, England, with sets designed by the art director Alex Vetchinsky, and on location.

== Critical reception ==
The Monthly Film Bulletin wrote: "Jeffrey Dell, the author and director of the film, has shown his skill at satirising the squirearchy on several occasions, and this film is no exception. Despite the story, it succeeds by good and consistent characterisation of both the major and the minor parts, by some good use of the camera and sound, and by the gentle mockery of the tradition which pervades the whole direction."

Kine Weekly wrote: "The play opens and ends in good style, it is exceedingly well acted by its all-star screen and stage cast, cracks a number of telling gags and is refreshingly English atmosphere. Its high spirits and good humour make it a jolly, original and engaging general comedy proposition."

Variety wrote: "Treatment of some familiar material is novel, There is a nice clean story, satirically unfolded and occasionally bordering on burlesque, but in a nice manner. This should be a success in America."

TV Guide wrote, "The talented leads are supported by a fine cast of character actors."
