= Strange Evidence =

- Frank Vosper and Carol Goodner in the film
- Directed by: Robert Milton
- Screenplay by: Miles Malleson; Lajos Bíró (story)
- Produced by: Alexander Korda
- Starring: Leslie Banks; Carol Goodner; George Curzon
- Cinematography: Robert Martin
- Edited by: Stephen Harris
- Production company: London Film Productions
- Distributed by: Paramount British Pictures
- Release date: January 1933 (UK)
- Running time: 71 minutes
- Country: United Kingdom
- Language: English

Strange Evidence (also known as Dance of the Witches and Wife in Pawn) is a 1933 British crime film directed by Robert Milton and starring Leslie Banks, George Curzon, Carol Goodner and Frank Vosper. It was written by Lajos Bíró and Miles Malleson, and produced as a quota quickie by Alexander Korda's London Film Productions at British and Dominions Imperial Studios, Elstree, with art direction by R. Holmes Paul.

== Preservation status ==
The British Film Institute National Archive holds a collection of ephemera and stills but no film or video materials.

== Plot ==
A promiscuous wife prefers a love affair with her cousin to caring for her sick husband, while also fighting off the advances of her lust crazed brother-in-law. When her husband is found poisoned to death, she is suspect No.1 for his murder.

== Cast ==
- Leslie Banks as Francis Relf
- Carol Goodner as Marie / Barbara Relf
- George Curzon as Stephen Relf
- Frank Vosper as Andrew Relf
- Norah Baring as Clare Relf
- Haidee Wright as Mrs. Relf
- Lyonel Watts as Henry Relf
- Lewis Shaw as Larry
- Diana Napier as Jean
- Merle Oberon bit part
- Miles Malleson uncredited

== Reception ==
Kine Weekly wrote: "A vague and rather melancholy drama, but one which allows a strong cast of established stage players to exploit their fine talents. The interest is mainly centred in the individual character – a drawing which, fortunately, is lifelike and vital enough to extract some arresting entertainment from the theme, and herein lies the major appeal."

The Daily Film Renter wrote: "Rambling and somewhat unconvincing story of woman wrongly accused of murdering her husband. Direction on pedestrian lines fails to infuse life into flimsy situations and redundant side-issues. Stilted dialogue and undistinguished acting, plus over-abundant footage. Good photography and settings. Booking for the uncritical."

Picturegoer wrote: "An artificial and rather theatrical drama."

Picture Show wrote: "An excellent cast is wasted on this loosely-woven, slow-moving production. ... gloomy atmosphere, dull dialogue, jerky continuity and meandering development."

Film critic Leslie Halliwell called Strange Evidence a "mildly interesting quickie whodunnit".
