= Those Who Love (1929 film) =

1929 film

Those Who Love is a 1929 British sound part-talkie drama film directed by H. Manning Haynes and starring Adele Blanche, William Freshman and Carol Goodner. The film was promoted as having two full reels of synchronized dialogue or talking sequences. In addition to the talking sequences, the film also featured a synchronized musical score with sound effects and English intertitles. The film was based on the novel Mary Was Love by Guy Fletcher. Anna Neagle made her debut in the film, playing a small part.

== Cast ==
- Adele Blanche ... Mary / Lorna
- William Freshman ... David Mellor
- Lawson Butt ... Joe
- Carol Goodner ... Anne
- Hannah Jones ... Babe
- Dino Galvani ... Frenchman
- Anna Neagle ... Minor role

== See also ==
- List of early sound feature films (1926–1929)
