= Mary's Start in die Ehe =

1931 film

- Directed by: Johannes Meyer
- Written by: Henry Koster; Wolfgang Wilhelm
- Produced by: Herbert Ephraim; Erich Schicker; Karl Schulz; Robert Wüllner
- Starring: Jenny Jugo; Hermann Thimig; Hermann Vallentin
- Cinematography: Karl Puth
- Edited by: Hanne Kuyt
- Music by: Felix Günther
- Production companies: Schulz & Wuellner Film
- Distributed by: Albo Film
- Release date: 2 November 1931
- Running time: 86 minutes
- Country: Germany
- Language: German

Mary's Start in die Ehe, also known as Ich bleib' bei dir, is a 1931 German romantic comedy film directed by Johannes Meyer and starring Jenny Jugo, Hermann Thimig and Hermann Vallentin. The film's sets were designed by the art director Erich Zander. It was remade the following year as There Goes the Bride, a British film starring Jessie Matthews.

== Cast ==
- Jenny Jugo
- Hermann Thimig
- Hermann Vallentin
- Eva Speyer
- Fritz Odemar
- Eva Schmid-Kayser
- Hansi Arnstaedt
- Kurt Lilien
- Martha Ziegler
- S.O. Schoening
- Willy Roxin
- Richard Ludwig
- Max Wilmsen
- Karl Junge-Swinburne

== Bibliography ==
- Cook, Pam (1997). Gainsborough Pictures. Cassell. ISBN 978-0-304-33708-8.
