= The Fire Raisers (film) =

1934 film

- Opening title card
- Directed by: Michael Powell
- Written by: Jerome Jackson; Michael Powell
- Produced by: Jerome Jackson
- Starring: Leslie Banks; Anne Grey; Carol Goodner; Frank Cellier
- Cinematography: Leslie Rowson
- Edited by: Derek Twist
- Production company: Gaumont British Picture Corporation
- Distributed by: Woolf & Freedman Film Service (UK); United Artists (US)
- Release date: 22 January 1934 (UK)
- Running time: 77 minutes
- Country: United Kingdom
- Language: English

The Fire Raisers is a 1934 British drama film directed by Michael Powell and starring Leslie Banks, Anne Grey, Carol Goodner and Frank Cellier. It was written by Jerome Jackson and Powell.

It was described by Powell as "a sort of Warner Brothers newspaper headline story" and marked the first of his four films with actor Leslie Banks.

== Plot ==
Jim Bronson is an insurance investigator, but he's unhappy with his work and gets involved with a gang of arsonists. His conscience is troubling him...

== Cast ==
- Leslie Banks as Jim Bronson
- Anne Grey as Arden Brent
- Carol Goodner as Helen Vaughan
- Frank Cellier as Brent
- Francis L. Sullivan as Stedding
- Lawrence Anderson as Twist
- Harry Caine as Bates
- Joyce Kirby as Polly

== Reception ==
The Daily Film Renter wrote: "First-rate drama with topical aspect. Slickly directed story surrounding activities of notorious fire assessor, with strong climax involving death of principal player. Fast moving, brilliantly mounted, and well acted. Genuine piece of strong entertainment that should get over everywhere."

Picturegoer wrote: "A picture which deals none too satisfactorily with the topical subject suggested by the title. It is all conventionally melodramatic, weak in dialogue, and containing a few fire thrills of a familiar order. ... Acting is as good as the parts allotted to the artistes allow it to be."

== Home media ==
The film has been released on Region 2 DVD by Opening in the "Les films de ma vie" series. The DVD has fixed French subtitles for the original English soundtrack.
