= There Goes the Bride (1932 film) =

1932 film

- Lobby card
- Directed by: Albert de Courville
- Written by: adaptation, scenario & dialogue: W. P. Lipscomb
- Story by: Henry Koster; Wolfgang Wilhelm
- Produced by: Michael Balcon
- Starring: Jessie Matthews; Owen Nares; Carol Goodner; Basil Radford; Roland Culver
- Cinematography: Alex Bryce
- Edited by: Ian Dalrymple
- Music by: songs: Noel Gay; Fred Raymond lyrics: Clifford Grey musical score: Louis Levy
- Production companies: Gainsborough Pictures in association with: British Lion Film Corporation; Presented by Gaumont-British Picture Corporation
- Distributed by: Ideal (UK)
- Release dates: 26 October 1932 (London, England)
- Running time: 79 minutes
- Country: United Kingdom
- Language: English

There Goes the Bride is a 1932 British comedy film directed by Albert de Courville and starring Jessie Matthews, Owen Nares, Carol Goodner, Basil Radford and Roland Culver. The screenplay concerns a woman who breaks off her an engagement and escapes to Paris. It is a remake of the German film Mary's Start in die Ehe, also known as Ich bleib' bei dir (1931). David Niven makes his film debut in a tiny uncredited role.

It was shot at Beaconsfield Studios. The film's sets were designed by the art director Norman Arnold.

The director insisted Jessie Matthws play the lead and she became a star.

There Goes the Bride was released on Region 2 DVD in 2009.

== Plot ==
Running away from an arranged marriage, businessman's daughter Annette (Jessie Matthews) boards a train to Paris, only to have her bag stolen, and then herself suspected of theft by Max (Owen Nares), a wealthy young man sharing her carriage. Annette insists she was robbed, but cannot go into further detail because her picture is all over the newspapers, and she needs to escape. Max refuses to let her out of his sight until she can better explain, which she says she promises to do after 24 hours have passed. Farcical situations ensue, involving Max's fiancé Cora (Carol Goodner), and all the while Max and Annette are falling in love.

== Cast ==
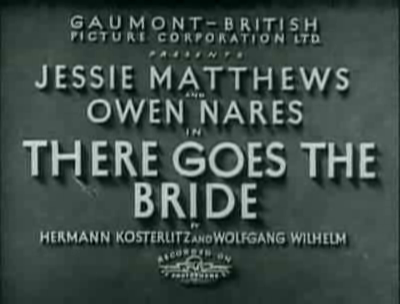
Title screen for There Goes the Bride

- Jessie Matthews as Annette Marquand
- Owen Nares as Max
- Carol Goodner as Cora
- Charles Carson as Monsieur Marquand
- Barbara Everest as Madame Marquand
- Basil Radford as Rudolph
- Winifred Oughton as Housekeeper
- Jerry Verno as Clark, the chauffeur
- Roland Culver as Jacques
- Jack Morrison as Alphonse
- Mignon O'Doherty as Madame Duchaine
- Max Kirby as Pierre
- Gordon McLeod as Monsieur Duchaine
- Laurence Hanray as Police Chief
- George Zucco as Prosecutor
- Carroll Gibbons as himself
- Savoy Orpheans as Themselves
- David Niven as Minor role

== Soundtrack ==
- "I'll Stay with You", sung by Jessie Matthews

== Critical reception ==
TV Guide gave the film one out of four stars, lamenting, "a series of barely funny screwball situations"; whereas Eye for Film wrote, "Matthews steals this bright little comedy. She has an effervescence and genuine likeability, which keep you watching," and concluded, "I would urge you to give this film a go - it is harmless fun."
