= Abdul the Damned =

1935 British film directed by Karl Grune

- Directed by: Karl Grune
- Written by: Robert Neumann; Ashley Dukes; Roger Burford; Warren Chetham-Strode; Emeric Pressburger; Curt Siodmak
- Produced by: Max Schach
- Starring: Fritz Kortner; Nils Asther; John Stuart; Adrienne Ames
- Cinematography: Otto Kanturek
- Edited by: A.C. Hammond; Walter Stokvis
- Music by: Hanns Eisler
- Production company: Alliance-Capital Productions
- Distributed by: Wardour Films (UK); Columbia Pictures (US)
- Release dates: 23 September 1935 (United Kingdom); 10 May 1936 (United States)
- Running time: 111 minutes
- Country: United Kingdom
- Language: English
- Budget: £50,000

Abdul the Damned (also known as Abdul Hamid) is a 1935 British drama film directed by Karl Grune and starring Fritz Kortner, Nils Asther and John Stuart. It was made at the British International Pictures studios by Alliance-Capitol Productions. It is set in the Ottoman Empire in the years before the First World War, during the reign of Sultan Abdul Hamid II and the constitutionalist Young Turks who dethroned him.

== Plot ==
Sultan Abdul Hamid II is the absolute ruler of the Ottoman Empire in 1908. That same year, the leader of the revolutionary CUP (Young Turks), Hilmi Pasha, returns from exile, threatening the Sultan's rule and the conservative opposition to the CUP. Seeking to please the old despot, the Osmanli chief of police assassinates the leader of the conservative opposition, and makes it look as if a Young Turk committed the crime in order to give the Sultan an excuse for arresting the CUP leadership. Meanwhile, the Sultan becomes infatuated with a visiting Austrian singer. When she rejects his advances, she endangers both herself and her fiancé, a Turkish officer who knows too much about the assassination plot.

== Cast ==
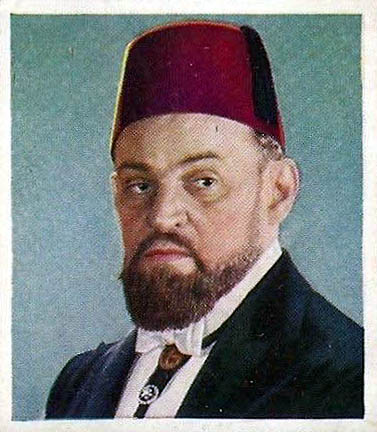
Fritz Kortner as Abdul Hamid II

- Fritz Kortner as Sultan Abdul Hamid II / Kelar
- Nils Asther as Chief of Police Kadar-Pasha
- John Stuart as Captain Talak-Bey
- Adrienne Ames as Therese Alder
- Esmé Percy as Ali - Chief Eunuch
- Walter Rilla as Hassan-Bey
- Charles Carson as General Hilmi-Pasha
- Patric Knowles as Omar - Hilmi's Attache
- Eric Portman as Conspirator
- Clifford Heatherley as Court Doctor
- Henry B. Longhurst as General of the Bodyguards
- Annie Esmond as Therese's Train Companion
- Harold Saxon-Snell as Chief Interrogator
- George Zucco as Officer of the Firing Squad
- Robert Naylor as Opera Singer
- Warren Jenkins as Young Turk Singer
- Henry Peterson as Spy
- Arthur Hardy as Ambassador

== Production ==
Schach borrowed £15,000 from Westminster Bank to make the film.

== Critical reception ==
The New York Times wrote, "Although the film achieves a few moments of dramatic interest—chiefly through the performance of the Continental Fritz Kortner—it is in the main a tedious and uninspired biography, scarred by hypodermic injections of stale melodrama"; whereas Film Weekly found it "magnificently acted by Fritz Kortner. Interesting, impressive and, for the most part, gripping entertainment."

== Bibliography ==
- Low, Rachael. Filmmaking in 1930s Britain. George Allen & Unwin, 1985.
