= Harold Warrender =

British actor and radio presenter (1903–1953)

- Warrender in 1930s
- Born: Harold John Warrender; 15 November 1903; London, England, United Kingdom
- Died: 6 May 1953 (aged 49); Gerrards Cross, Buckinghamshire, England, United Kingdom
- Occupation: actor
- Years active: 1928–1953

Harold John Warrender (15 November 1903 – 6 May 1953) was a British stage, film and television actor, and radio presenter.

His father was Sir George Warrender, 7th Baronet. His mother was Lady Ethel Maud Ashley Cooper, a singer and patron of music, and personal friend of the composer Edward Elgar and his wife Caroline Alice Roberts.

Warrender became well-known in the 1940s for his part in the popular radio variety show 'Merry-Go-Round' in which he conducted a cash quiz called 'Double or Quits.' The show started as a Forces entertainment which after the war continued in the BBC Light Programme.

== Family ==
In 1942 Warrender married Constance Elizabeth Fowles, daughter of John Fowles vicar of Rye, East Sussex. They had no children.

He died suddenly at his home at Gerrard's Cross on 6 May 1953, following a collapse after mowing his lawn. He was 49.

== Filmography ==
Year	Title	Role	Notes
1934	Leave It to Blanche	Guardee	
1934	I Spy	NBG	
1934	Lady in Danger	Clive	
1935	Lazybones	Lord Melton	
1935	Mimi	Marcel	
1935	Invitation to the Waltz	Duke of Wurtemburg	
1940	Contraband	Lt. Cmdr. Ellis, RN	
1940	Convoy	Lt. Commander Martin	
1940	Sailors Three	Pilot's Mate	
1948	Under the Frozen Falls	Mr. Carlington	
1948	Scott of the Antarctic	Dr. E.A. Wilson	
1949	Warning to Wantons	Count Anton Kardak	
1949	Conspirator	Col. Hammerbrook	
1951	Pandora and the Flying Dutchman	Geoffrey Fielding	
1951	The Six Men	Holroyd	
1951	Where No Vultures Fly	Mannering	
1952	Ivanhoe	Locksley	
1953	Time Bomb	Sir Evelyn Jordan	
1953	Intimate Relations	George	
