= Invitation to the Waltz (film) =

- Directed by: Paul Merzbach
- Written by: Eric Maschwitz (play); Roger Burford; Clifford Grey; Paul Merzbach
- Produced by: Walter C. Mycroft
- Starring: Lilian Harvey; Wendy Toye; Carl Esmond
- Cinematography: Claude Friese-Greene; Ronald Neame
- Edited by: John Neill Brown
- Music by: Walter Goehr
- Production company: British International Pictures
- Distributed by: Wardour Films
- Release date: October 1935
- Running time: 82 minutes
- Country: United Kingdom
- Language: English

Invitation to the Waltz is a 1935 British historical musical film directed by Paul Merzbach and starring Lilian Harvey, Wendy Toye and Carl Esmond. It was based on a play by Eric Maschwitz.

== Production ==
It was made by British International Pictures at Elstree Studios. The film's sets were designed by John Mead and Clarence Elder. Much of the film's score consists of extracts of classical music arranged by Walter Goehr, including Weber's Invitation to the Dance; the pianist was Stanislas Niedzielski. It was the only film made in Britain by the London-born German star Lilian Harvey. Harvey had returned from Hollywood and signed a three-film contract with British International Pictures, but after making only this film she returned to Germany and agreed a new contract with UFA.

== Synopsis ==
In London, Jenny, an aspiring ballet dancer, meets an aide to the Duke of Wuerttemberg who is in Britain for a marriage alliance and financial treaty to supply troops to Britain for the war against Napoleon. After being discovered by an Italian impresario she goes to Venice to be trained as a great dancer. The visiting Duke of Wuerttemberg becomes fascinated with her and engages her to perform at the state opera house in his capital of Stuttgart, hoping also to make her his mistress.

The British authorities encourage Jenny to go to Stuttgart and try to live extravagantly at the Duke's expense in the hope that a shortage of funds with compel him to renew his treaty against Napoleon. However at the border she once again meets Carl, the handsome aide she had first encountered in London, who has been ordered to escort her, and who is hurt by the fact that she now appears to be the Duke's lover. Unable to reveal the true purpose of her mission to him, she outrages him and the inhabitants of the Duchy by the exorbitant demands she makes of their ruler.

Having finally persuaded the Duke to sign the treaty with Britain, her plans to escape from the Duchy are wrecked when Napoleon invades and captures Stuttgart. Forced to appear in a command performance for the Emperor, immediately after dancing, and with the complicity of Napoleon himself, she is able to cross the border with Carl hidden inside her trunk.

== Cast ==
- Lilian Harvey as Jenny Peachey
- Wendy Toye as Signora Picci
- Carl Esmond as Lieutenant Colonel Carl Kerner
- Harold Warrender as Duke of Wurtemburg
- Richard Bird as Weber
- Esmé Percy as Napoleon Bonaparte
- Eric Stanley as Sir Francis
- Alexander Field as George Peachey
- Anton Dolin as Chief Dancer
- Hay Petrie as Periteau
- Charles Carson as Signor Lombardi
- Hal Gordon as Sergeant
- Gus McNaughton as Valet
- Ronald Shiner as the Street Vendor

== Release ==
The film was released on 23 March 1936. It was issued on DVD in 2016 in a new transfer on Volume 5 of the networkonair / Studio Canal series 'British Musicals of the 1930s', 7954438.

== Bibliography ==
- Bergfelder, Tim & Cargnelli, Christian. Destination London: German-speaking emigrés and British cinema, 1925-1950. Berghahn Books, 2008.
- Low, Rachael. Filmmaking in 1930s Britain. George Allen & Unwin, 1985.
- Wood, Linda. British Films, 1927-1939. British Film Institute, 1986.
