= L. du Garde Peach =

British writer (1890–1974)

- Portrait of L. Du Garde Peach by Thomas Cantrell Dugdale
- Born: Lawrence du Garde Peach; 14 February 1890; Sheffield, England
- Died: 31 December 1974 (aged 84); Foolow, Derbyshire
- Education: Manchester University; PhD at Sheffield University in 1921
- Occupations: English author and playwright for radio, stage, and screen
- Writing career
- Language: English
- Notable works: Adventure from History series; Music Hath Charms (1935); Turn of the Tide (1935)
- Notable awards: OBE for services for literature in 1972; honorary DLitt from Sheffield University in 1964

Lawrence du Garde Peach (14 February 1890 – 31 December 1974), who wrote under the name L. du Garde Peach, was an English author and playwright for radio, stage, and screen. He is best remembered as the author of over thirty works in the Adventure from History series of non-fiction books for children which was published by Ladybird Books between 1957 and his death in 1974. It was the largest series Ladybird produced, and remained in print until 1986.

== Life ==
Peach, the son of Mary Ann (née Munns) and Charles Peach, a Unitarian minister and later the Secretary of the Northern Counties Education League, was born in 1890 in Sheffield, and attended Manchester Grammar School and Victoria University of Manchester before taking up a postgraduate position at University of Göttingen in 1912, later earning a PhD at Sheffield University in 1921 for a thesis on the development of drama in France, Spain and England in the 17th century. He married Emily Marianne Leeming in 1915, and served in military intelligence during World War I, serving for a period in France and reaching the rank of captain.

From the early 1920s, he began regularly writing humorous pieces for Punch and other magazines, and after a period as a lecturer at the University College of the South West of England (later to become the University of Exeter), Peach left academia to become a full-time writer. A major outlet was the then new medium of radio, for which he wrote his first play in 1924. Much of his work for radio dramatised history and biography, and became a staple of the Children's Hour strand for younger listeners.

He also wrote extensively for the stage, forming a close relationship with the Sheffield Playhouse, and from 1934 to 1936, he wrote for a number of films, ranging from horror The Ghoul (1933), The Man Who Changed His Mind (1936), and musical comedy Princess Charming (1934), Land Without Music (1936), to serious drama adaptations Turn of the Tide (1935), and the all-star spectacular Transatlantic Tunnel (1935). He turned down lucrative offers from Hollywood, preferring not to have to deal with all the whims of those in the production process. Frank Launder once claimed that he and Sidney Gilliat had to abandon "most of the script" for Seven Sinners (1936) and that Peach's "only virtue was speed."

Peach was also a great supporter of the idea of amateur theatre, and wrote a number of plays specially tailored for particular kinds of amateur groups. In 1927 he founded an amateur group at Great Hucklow, close to his home in the Peak District of Derbyshire, which achieved a notably high standard. It continued until 1971 and ceased after he cut off his toe while mowing the lawn, this accident handicapping his activity. He wrote many plays and produced many productions for the group, and in 1938 created its own theatre, converted from an old lead mining building. Peach was influential in the Derbyshire Rural Community Council and became the first editor of their journal, The Derbyshire Countryside, in 1931. Through the pages of this publication he was able to promote local theatre as a way of developing local communities. He also was involved with the formation of Tideswell Community Players in the next village and starred in its first production, Ambrose Applejohn's Adventure in 1930. After the war he also produced a number of large-scale theatrical pageants in Sheffield, Manchester and elsewhere.

Peach also entered the world of politics, standing as a candidate for the Liberal Party at the 1929 General Election in the dual member seat of Derby, without success.

He was made an OBE for services for literature in 1972, and recognised with an honorary DLitt from Sheffield University in 1964. He died in 1974 at his home in Foolow, Derbyshire, about a mile from Great Hucklow, two years after the death of his wife.

== Selected filmography ==
- Princess Charming (1934)
- Music Hath Charms (1935)
- It's a Bet (1935)
- The Crouching Beast (1935)
- Turn of the Tide (1935)
- Dusty Ermine (1936)
- The Man Who Changed His Mind (1936)
- Land Without Music (1936)
- His Lordship (1936)
- Melody and Romance (1937)
- The Great Mr. Handel (1942)
- Get Cracking (1943)
