= Richard Tauber =

Austrian tenor and actor (1891–1948)

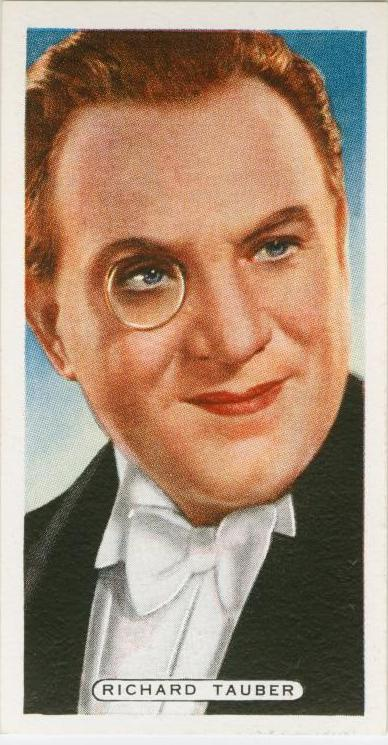
- Richard Tauber on a cigarette card
- Born: Richard Denemy; 16 May 1891; Linz, Austria-Hungary
- Died: 8 January 1948 (aged 56); London, England
- Occupations: Opera singer, actor
- Years active: 1912–1947
- Spouses: Carlotta Vanconti (m. 1926; div. 1928) Diana Napier (m. 1936)

Richard Tauber (16 May 1891 – 8 January 1948) was an Austrian lyric tenor and film actor. He performed the tenor role in numerous operas, including Don Giovanni by Mozart and Lorenzo Da Ponte.

== Early life ==
Richard Tauber was born in Linz, Austria, to Elisabeth Seifferth (née Denemy), a widow and actress who performed soubrette roles at the local theater, and Richard Anton Tauber, an actor. His parents were not married, and his father was reportedly unaware of his birth as he was touring North America at the time. The child was named Richard Denemy. He was sometimes known as [Carl] Richard Tauber and also used his mother's married name, Seiffert; however, the claim by the Encyclopædia Britannica that he was ever known as Ernst Seiffert is not supported by any of the 12 published books and monographs about him listed in Daniel O'Hara's comprehensive Richard Tauber Chronology. After being adopted by his father in 1913, his legal name became Richard Denemy-Tauber.

Tauber accompanied his mother on theatrical tours, but she found it increasingly difficult to manage and eventually left him with foster parents in Urfahr, now a suburb of Linz. In 1897–98, he attended school in Linz, after which his father assumed responsibility for his upbringing, moving him to Graz, Prague, Berlin, Salzburg, and finally Wiesbaden. His father, who was born Jewish, but had converted to Roman Catholicism, hoped his son would become a priest. However, the boy missed the excitement of the theater and instead joined his father in Prague and later, in 1903, at the theater in Wiesbaden.

Although Tauber aspired to become a singer, he failed to impress the teachers he auditioned for, likely because he chose to sing Wagner, a repertoire unsuited to his voice. His father enrolled him at the Hoch Conservatory in Frankfurt to study piano, composition, and conducting. Tauber made rapid progress in his studies but remained determined to pursue a career as a singer.

== Early career ==
After an intensive period of vocal training under Carl Beines, Tauber made his public debut at a concert in Freiburg on 17 May 1912. That same year, his father was appointed Intendant of the Municipal Theater in Chemnitz, which allowed him to arrange Tauber's debut as Tamino in The Magic Flute on 2 March 1913. A few weeks later, on 16 April, Tauber performed the role of Max in Der Freischütz. This performance was attended by Nikolaus Count von Seebach of the Dresden Opera, who had already offered Tauber a five-year contract starting on 1 August. The Count encouraged Tauber to take small roles with other companies to broaden his experience.

During his tenure in Dresden, Tauber earned a reputation as an exceptionally quick learner. He mastered Gounod's Faust in 48 hours and learned Bacchus in Richard Strauss's Ariadne auf Naxos overnight, astonishing Strauss, who conducted the performance in Berlin. This earned him the nickname "the SOS Tenor." In 1926, he rescued the German premiere of Puccini's Turandot at the Staatsoper Dresden by learning the role of Calaf in three days after tenor Curt Taucher fell ill.

After guest appearances at the Wiener Volksoper in 1920, Tauber made his Vienna State Opera debut on 16 June in La bohème, stepping in for an indisposed Alfred Piccaver. In 1922, he signed a five-year contract with the Vienna State Opera and subsequently performed with the Berlin State Opera. For many years, he divided his time between these two companies, spending four months with each, while reserving the remaining months for concerts, guest appearances with other companies, and international tours.

Tauber sang tenor roles in numerous operas, including Don Giovanni, The Bartered Bride, Tosca, Mignon, Faust, Carmen, and Die Fledermaus. He also appeared in modern works such as Erich Korngold's Die tote Stadt and Wilhelm Kienzl's Der Evangelimann. According to Daniel O'Hara's Tauber Chronology, he performed over 100 roles in opera and operetta.

In June 1919, Tauber made the first of more than seven hundred gramophone records. All his vocal recordings were produced for the Odeon Records label, and from 1933 onwards, for the associated Parlophone label. Tauber's lyrical, flexible tenor voice was renowned for its warm, elegant legato. His exceptional breath control allowed him to produce a superb head voice, remarkable messa di voce, and exquisite pianissimo. His physical appearance also contributed to his elegant stage presence, despite a slight squint in his right eye, which he camouflaged by wearing a monocle. When paired with a top hat, the monocle enhanced his distinctive and sophisticated look.

Tauber first performed in an operetta by Franz Lehár at the Volksbühne in Berlin in 1920. This was Zigeunerliebe, a role he also performed in Linz and Salzburg in 1921. In 1922, he was offered the role of Armand in Lehár's Frasquita at the Theater an der Wien, and the experience was a resounding success. Although some critics looked down on his venture into operetta, it proved beneficial for Tauber, helping him gain a new audience and revitalizing Lehár's career as a composer of operetta. In the years that followed, Lehár composed several operettas with roles written specifically for Richard Tauber, including Paganini (1925, although Tauber was unavailable for the Vienna premiere and first performed it in Berlin in 1926), Der Zarewitsch (1927), Friederike (1928), The Land of Smiles (1929), which featured the famous aria "Dein ist mein ganzes Herz", Schön ist die Welt (1930), and Giuditta (1934). The hit songs, typically in the second act, became informally known as Tauberlieder.

Tauber also appeared in several films, both in Germany and later in England. Notably, he provided a 'voice-over', singing the title song in the otherwise silent film I Kiss Your Hand, Madame (1929).

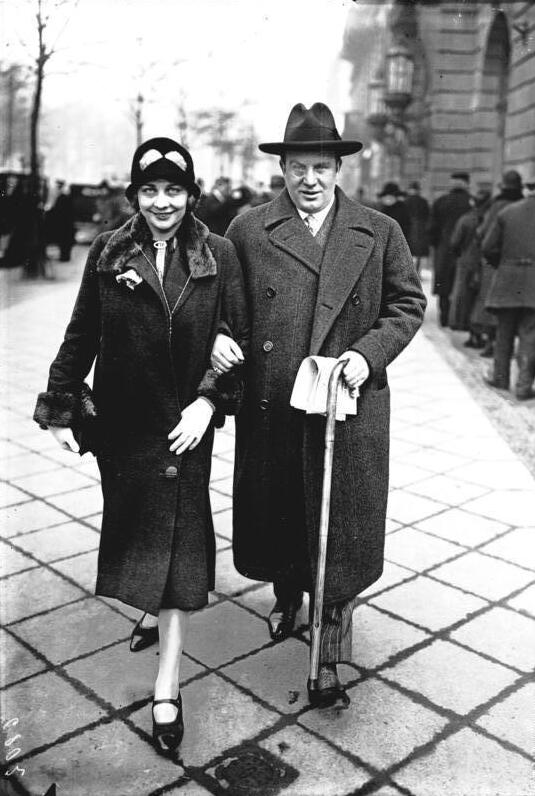
Richard Tauber and Carlotta Vanconti, c. 1928

While in Vienna, Tauber also conducted at the Theater an der Wien, where, in 1924, he met the soprano Carlotta Vanconti. She soon divorced her Italian husband and married Tauber on 18 March 1926. They separated in 1928 and divorced later that same year in Berlin. However, the divorce was only legally recognized in Germany. In 1929, Tauber met Mary Losseff at Rudolf Nelson's review in Berlin, and they lived together for about five years. Losseff became his muse, and it was for her that he composed Der singende Traum. Although Losseff's career was cut short by alcoholism, Tauber remained her lifelong friend and supported her until his death.

In 1931, Tauber made his London debut in operetta, and London performances became a regular part of his schedule. He also toured the United States that same year. In 1933, Tauber was attacked in the street by a group of Nazi Brownshirts due to his Jewish ancestry. Following the assault, he decided to leave Germany for his native Austria, where he continued to perform at the Vienna State Opera until the Anschluss in March 1938.

During the mid-1930s, Tauber made several musical films in England. In April 1935, at the premiere of the film Mimi, he met the English actress Diana Napier (1905–1982). After protracted legal proceedings to secure an Austrian divorce from Vanconti, they married on 20 June 1936. Napier appeared in three of his British films: Heart's Desire (1935), Land Without Music, and Pagliacci (both 1936).

== Later career ==
In 1938, Tauber made his London operatic debut in Die Zauberflöte under Sir Thomas Beecham. Earlier that year, the Nazi government of Germany annexed Austria, and Tauber left for good. In response, the Nazis withdrew the Taubers' passports and right of abode; this left the couple technically stateless, prompting Tauber to apply for British citizenship. He was touring South Africa when World War II broke out and returned to Switzerland until receiving the papers allowing him to enter the UK in March 1940. Germany had banned recordings of his music in 1937.

Despite receiving lucrative offers from the United States, he remained in the UK throughout the war. With little opera staged in wartime Britain, he earned a living by singing, conducting, and making gramophone records and radio broadcasts. He even composed English operettas with lyricist Fred S. Tysh. From one of these, Old Chelsea, the song "My Heart and I" became one of his most popular English recordings. It was only these English records that generated royalties for him; for his earlier recordings, he had been paid per performance and had been forced to leave his savings behind in Austria. By this time, he was so crippled by arthritis that he could no longer move in and out of the microphone for softer and louder notes. To address this, a small trolley was constructed on rubber wheels, allowing engineers to silently roll him back and forth while recording.

In 1946, Tauber appeared in a Broadway adaptation of The Land of Smiles (Yours is my Heart), which flopped, leaving him with huge personal losses and in debt to the backers. He was thus forced to tour the United States, Canada, Central, and South America for six months to recoup the losses, with Arpad Sandor and George Schick serving as his accompanists, and Neil Chotem as an assisting artist. In April 1947, Tauber returned to London and sought medical attention for a persistent cough. He was eventually diagnosed with lung cancer: one lung was already useless, and the other nearly so.

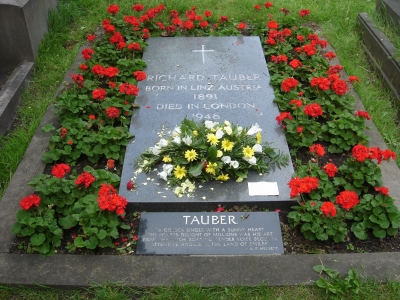
Gravestone, Brompton Cemetery, London

The Vienna State Opera was in London for a short season at the Royal Opera House – their first visit since the war – and they invited Tauber to sing one performance with his old company. On 27 September 1947, he sang the role of Don Ottavio in Don Giovanni, a relatively small part but with two difficult arias that demand good breath control. Those in the audience reported that he sang wonderfully, earning loud applause. Live excerpts of these two arias from this performance survive, revealing a tone of undiminished focus and steadiness, a good line, and somewhat shortened phrasing.

== Death ==
Three days after his last performance, Tauber entered Guy's Hospital on October 1, 1947, to have his left lung removed to treat the cancer. Despite this, he died of complications on January 8, 1948, at the London Clinic, Devonshire Place. His Requiem Mass was held at St. James's Church, Spanish Place. He was interred in Brompton Cemetery in London.

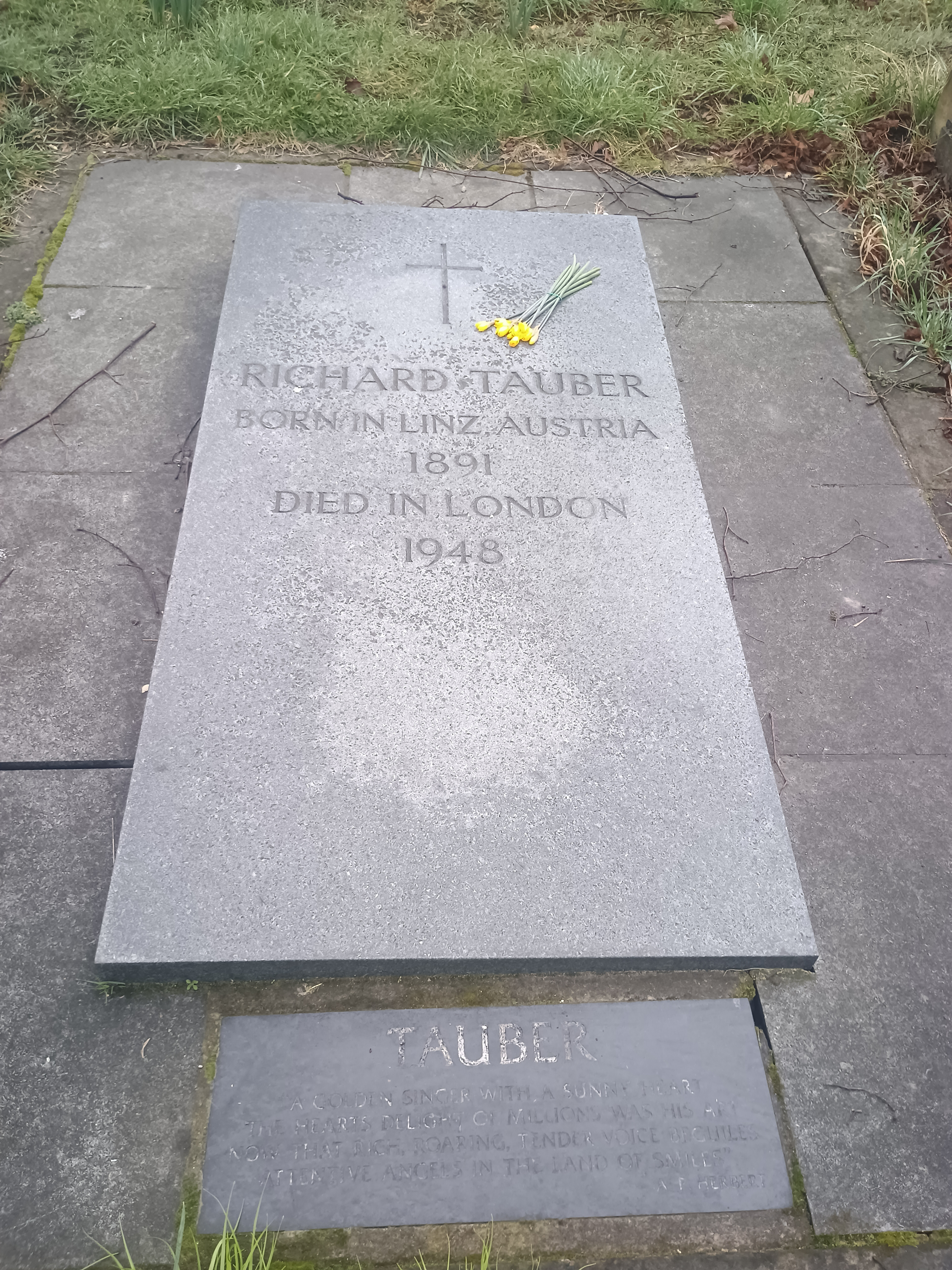
Grave of Richard Tauber at West Brompton Cemetery

== Selected discography ==
Tauber made over 720 vocal recordings for the Odeon/Parlophone companies, as well as several as an orchestral conductor, primarily of his own works, but also of music by Grieg and Johann Strauss, Jr. Among the 120 acoustic recordings, the most notable include arias by Mozart, Tchaikovsky, and Kienzl, along with songs by Schumann, Richard Strauss, and Grieg. Additionally, there are five duets with Elisabeth Rethberg, arias by Verdi, Puccini, and others, as well as excerpts from Korngold's Die tote Stadt, including a duet with Lotte Lehmann. Among the electrical recordings are albums of German folksongs, 12 songs from Schubert's Winterreise, accompanied by Mischa Spoliansky, and an album of folksongs by Franz Gabriel and Hermann Löns. Perhaps most prized are the four Mozart arias recorded in 1938 and 1939, and the aria from Der Freischütz made in 1946. Among his final recordings are two songs by Richard Strauss, accompanied at the piano by Percy Kahn. During his lifetime, his numerous recordings of music by Franz Lehár, much of which was composed specifically for him, and his own songs from the operetta Old Chelsea (1942) were bestsellers, alongside a vast array of lighter and popular music in both German and English. A number of his broadcasts have been preserved, including a series of General Motors Concerts from America in 1937, a Radio Hilversum concert from 1939, and excerpts from his three series of weekly programs for the BBC (1945–47).

== Selected filmography ==
- Reise-Abenteuer (1925) [short silent]
- Achtung! Aufnahme! (1927) [short silent]
- I Kiss Your Hand, Madame (1929)
- Never Trust a Woman (1930, Ich glaub' nie mehr an eine Frau)
- End of the Rainbow (1930, Das lockende Ziel)
- The Land of Smiles (1930)
- The Big Attraction (1931, Die große Attraktion)
- Melody of Love (1932, Melodie der Liebe)
- Blossom Time (1934)
- Heart's Desire (1935)
- Land Without Music (1936)
- Pagliacci (1936)
- Waltz Time (1945)
- Lisbon Story (1946)
