= Charles Korvin =

Hungarian-American film, television and stage actor (1907–1998)

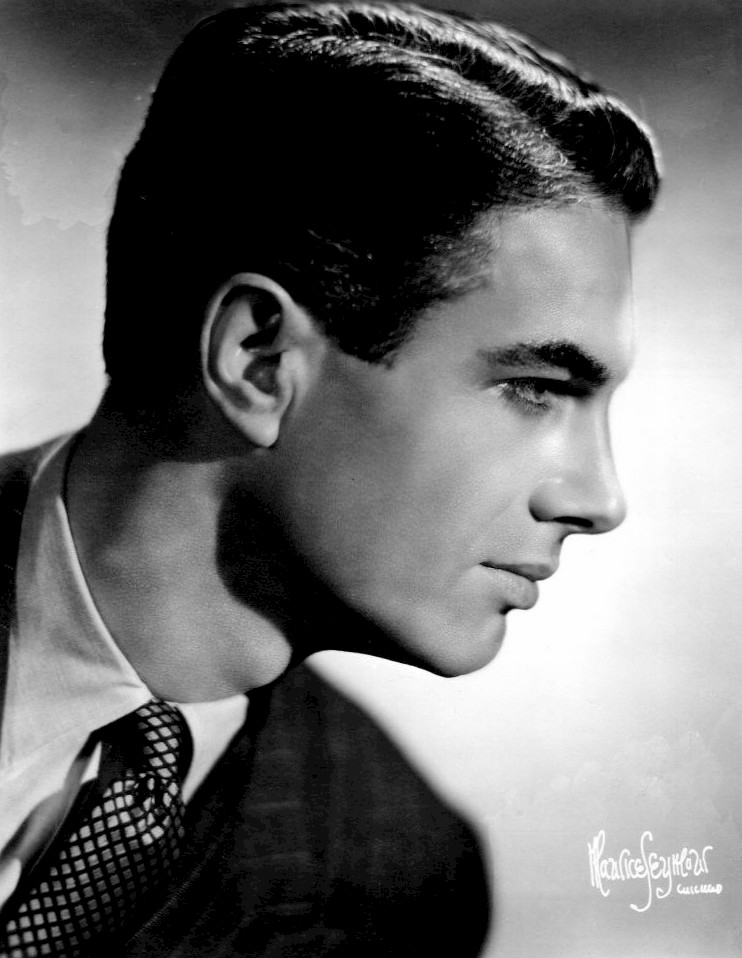
- Korvin in 1948
- Born: Géza Karpathi; November 21, 1907; Pöstyén, Austria-Hungary (now Piešťany, Slovakia)
- Died: June 18, 1998 (aged 90); New York City, U.S.
- Other name: Géza Korvin
- Education: Sorbonne
- Occupation: Actor
- Years active: 1937–1993
- Spouses: Helena Maria Fredricks (m. 1945; div. 1955) Anne Korvin (m. 1955; died 1986): Natasha Korvin
- Children: 2, including Edward Danziger Korvin

Charles Korvin (born Géza Kárpáthi, November 21, 1907 – June 18, 1998) was a Hungarian-American film, television and stage actor. He was also a professional still and motion picture photographer and a master chef.

== Early life ==
Korvin was born in Pöstyén, Austro-Hungary (now Piešťany, Slovakia) and studied at the Sorbonne.

== Career ==
During his 10 years in France, he was hired by Yvon, the famous French postcard company, shooting photographs on location all over the country. In 1937, he was hired for a CBC documentary film project about the renowned Canadian medical doctor, Norman Bethune. Korvin photographed and co-directed the anti-Franco film, Heart of Spain, which was shot on the front lines during the Spanish Civil War. Moving to the United States in 1940, he studied acting and stagecraft at the Barter Theater in Abingdon, Virginia.

As Géza Korvin, he made his Broadway stage debut in 1943, playing a Russian nobleman in the play, Dark Eyes. After signing a movie contract with Universal Pictures, he changed his stage name to Charles Korvin.

He worked steadily through the 1940s, including appearing in three films with actress Merle Oberon. He was a victim of the blacklist around 1952, when he refused to testify before the HUAC, and his film career halted.

Turning to the newly burgeoning, and much less political, field of broadcast television, Korvin starred in early productions for Playhouse 90, Studio One, and US Steel Hour. He played The Eagle for six contiguous episodes on Disney's Zorro and played Latin dance instructor Carlos on The Honeymooners episode "Mama Loves Mambo". In 1960, he starred as Inspector Duval in the UK/US television series Interpol Calling produced by J. Arthur Rank. During these years, Korvin returned to off-Broadway theater starring as the king in Rodgers and Hammerstein's The King and I with runs at the Westbury Music Fair and the St. Louis Municipal Opera Theatre (co-starring Betty White). He was back on Broadway in the mid-1960s starring as the upstairs neighbor in Neil Simon's Tony Award winning play, “Barefoot in the Park”. In 1964, he returned to Hollywood to play the ship’s captain in Stanley Kramer's Academy Award winning film, Ship of Fools. Remaining active in later years, he was the voice of the Red Baron for eight years on television and radio ads for Lufthansa Airlines.

== Personal life ==
For more than 25 years Korvin and his wife Anne were part-of-the-year residents in Klosters, Switzerland, where he enjoyed skiing, cooking and entertaining with friends and fellow part time residents Irwin and Marion Shaw, Greta Garbo, Salka Viertel, Deborah Kerr, and Gaetan de Rosnay, among others. Korvin claimed to have been Garbo's last dance partner.

Julia Child, another long time friend, was interviewed in 1978 by Dick Cavett on his PBS television show. When he asked her to name her favorite amateur chef, Child replied, “Charles Korvin”.

== Partial filmography ==
- Enter Arsène Lupin (1944) - Arsene Lupin
- This Love of Ours (1945) - Dr. Michel Touzac
- Temptation (1946) - Mahoud Baroudi
- Berlin Express (1948) - Perrot
- The Killer That Stalked New York (1950) - Matt Krane
- Tarzan's Savage Fury (1952) - Rokov, Russian Agent
- Lydia Bailey (1952) - Col. Gabriel D'autremont
- Sangaree (1953) - Felix Pagnol
- Studio One (1955) - Gastman, 1 episode, "The Judge and His Hangman"
- Thunderstorm (1956) - Pablo Gardia
- Ship of Fools (1965) - Capt. Thiele
- The Man Who Had Power Over Women (1970) - Alfred Felix
- Inside Out (1975) - Peter Dohlberg

== Sources ==
- Lamparski, R. (1986) Whatever became of ... ? Tenth series, Crown Publishers, Inc.: New York. ISBN 0-517-56229-4.
