= This Love of Ours =

1945 film by William Dieterle

- Directed by: William Dieterle
- Screenplay by: Bruce Manning; John D. Klorer (as John Klorer); Leonard Lee
- Based on: Come prima meglio di prima 1923 play by Luigi Pirandello
- Produced by: Howard Benedict; Edward Dodds (associate producer)
- Starring: Merle Oberon; Claude Rains; Charles Korvin
- Cinematography: Lucien Ballard
- Edited by: Frank Gross
- Music by: Hans J. Salter (as H.J. Salter)
- Production company: Universal Pictures
- Distributed by: Universal Pictures
- Release date: 31 October 1945
- Running time: 90 minutes
- Country: United States
- Language: English
- Box office: $353,711 (Latin America)

This Love of Ours is a 1945 American drama film directed by William Dieterle and starring Merle Oberon, Maris Wrixon, Claude Rains, Charles Korvin and Carl Esmond. The film's composer, Hans J. Salter, was nominated for an Academy Award for Best Original Score in 1946. This drama from Universal Pictures was later remade as Never Say Goodbye (1956) and the French television film Comme avant, mieux qu'avant (1972).

== Cast ==
- Merle Oberon as Karin Touzac, also known as Florence Hale
- Claude Rains as Dr. Joseph Targel
- Charles Korvin as Michel Touzac
- Carl Esmond as Uncle Robert
- Maris Wrixon as Evelyn
- Sue England as Susette Touzac
- Jess Barker as Chadwick
- Helene Thimig as Tucker
- Harry Davenport as Dr. Jerry Wilkerson
- Dave Willock as Dr. Dailey
- Ralph Morgan as Dr. Lane
- Howard Freeman as Dr. Barnes
- Fritz Leiber as Dr. Bailey
