= Interval (1973 film) =

1973 film by Daniel Mann

- Directed by: Daniel Mann
- Written by: Gavin Lambert
- Produced by: Merle Oberon
- Starring: Merle Oberon; Robert Wolders
- Cinematography: Gabriel Figueroa
- Edited by: Howard S. Deane
- Music by: Armando Manzanero; Rubén Fuentes
- Production companies: Estudios Churubusco Azteca S.A.; Euro-American-Films
- Distributed by: Avco Embassy
- Release date: 1973
- Running time: 84 minutes
- Country: United States
- Language: English

Interval is a 1973 romantic drama film starring Merle Oberon in her final performance. Oberon also produced the movie, and fell in love with her co-star in it, Robert Wolders, divorcing her husband to marry Wolders in 1975. This film was widely criticized for its outdated approach to romance.

== Plot ==
Serena Moore has been everywhere and is trying to put her past behind her. She finds refuge in Mexico where, without intending to, falls in love with a much younger painter Chris.

== Cast ==
- Merle Oberon ... Serena Moore
- Robert Wolders ... Chris
- Claudio Brook ... Armando Vertiz
- Russ Conway ... Fraser
- Britt Leach ... Leonard
- Peter von Zerneck ... Broch
- Anel ... Jackie

== Reception ==
In The New York Times, Roger Greenspun wrote:

It is one of those ecstatic affairs, full of wonder and discovery, and yet it doesn't work. Perhaps Serena is just too fine, too sensitive. Perhaps it is something else. There is a problem, a silent traveler with Serena on her journeys, which I wouldn't bring up if the movie didn't keep bringing it up—in whispers: "The age thing." Though it is the last thought on his mind, and though you could never tell from looking at her, at some point Chris has to admit that Serena is—well—"over 40."But truth to tell, Merle Oberon is well over 60, and from time to time it shows.

== See also ==
- List of American films of 1973
