= The Virginian (TV series) =

American Western television series (1962–1971)

- Also known as: The Men from Shiloh
- Genre: Western
- Based on: The Virginian by Owen Wister
- Starring: James Drury; Doug McClure; Lee J. Cobb; Charles Bickford; John McIntire; Clu Gulager; Gary Clarke; Randy Boone; Roberta Shore; Diane Roter; Sara Lane; Don Quine; Harper Flaherty
- Theme music composer: Percy Faith; (seasons 1–8); Ennio Morricone; (season 9)
- Opening theme: "Lonesome Tree"; conducted by Stanley Wilson
- Ending theme: "Lonesome Tree"; conducted by Stanley Wilson
- Composers: Percy Faith; Richard Shores; Dave Grusin
- Country of origin: United States
- Original language: English
- No. of seasons: 9
- No. of episodes: 249 (list of episodes)

Production
- Executive producers: Charles Marquis Warren; Norman Macdonnell; Frank Price; Roy Huggins
- Producers: Morton Fine; David Friedkin; Joel Rogosin; Winston Miller; Cy Chermak; Frank Telford; Arthur H. Nadel; Don Ingalls; Paul Freeman; Warren B. Duff; Jules Schermer
- Cinematography: Benjamin H. Kline; Lionel Lindon; Enzo Martinelli; John Russell; Walter Strenge
- Running time: 74–77 minutes
- Production companies: Revue Studios; (1962–1963); (season 1); Universal Television; (1963–1971); (seasons 2–9)

Original release
- Network: NBC
- Release: September 19, 1962 – March 24, 1971

Related
- Laredo

The Virginian (renamed The Men from Shiloh in its final year) is an American Western television series starring James Drury in the title role, along with Doug McClure and Lee J. Cobb, originally broadcast on NBC from 1962 to 1971, for a total of 249 episodes. Drury had played the same role in 1958 in an unsuccessful pilot that became an episode of the NBC summer series Decision. Filmed in color, The Virginian became television's first 90-minute Western series (75 minutes excluding commercial breaks). Cobb left the series after four seasons, and was replaced over the years by mature character actors John Dehner, Charles Bickford, John McIntire, and Stewart Granger, all portraying different characters. It was set before Wyoming became a state in 1890, as mentioned several times as Wyoming Territory, although other references set it later, around 1898.

The series was loosely based on The Virginian: Horseman of the Plains, a 1902 Western novel by Owen Wister that Hollywood had previously adapted for movies. Percy Faith composed the show's original theme.

The series ran for nine seasons, making it network television's third-longest running Western series, behind Bonanza at 14 seasons and 432 episodes, and Gunsmoke at 20 seasons and 635 episodes.

== Production ==
When Revue Productions' hour long series Wagon Train moved from the NBC network to ABC, The Virginian was proposed to replace it. From the beginning, the 90-minute series was filmed in Technicolor on 35 mm movie film. The half-hour pilot in 1958 was filmed in black-and-white.

== Synopsis ==
=== Pilot ===
The half-hour black and white pilot titled The Virginian aired in 1958 as part of the anthology series Decision, which in other weeks aired pilots for six other series.

In the pilot, unlike in the later series, the Virginian had a noticeable Southern accent and wore a belt buckle marked "CSA", indicating service in the Confederate States Army. The portrayal of him as a young American Civil War veteran of Jeb Stuart's army would indicate that the time period of the pilot was decades earlier than that of the series. He arrived by invitation at the ranch of Judge Henry (Robert Burton) to be an accountant and manager. He soon becomes involved in unraveling a plot to destroy the judge's efforts to create a new town in the surrounding region. Other actors in the pilot, some of whom appeared in the series years later, included Andrew Duggan, Jeanette Nolan, and (in a small, nonspeaking role) Dan Blocker.

=== Seasons 1–8 ===
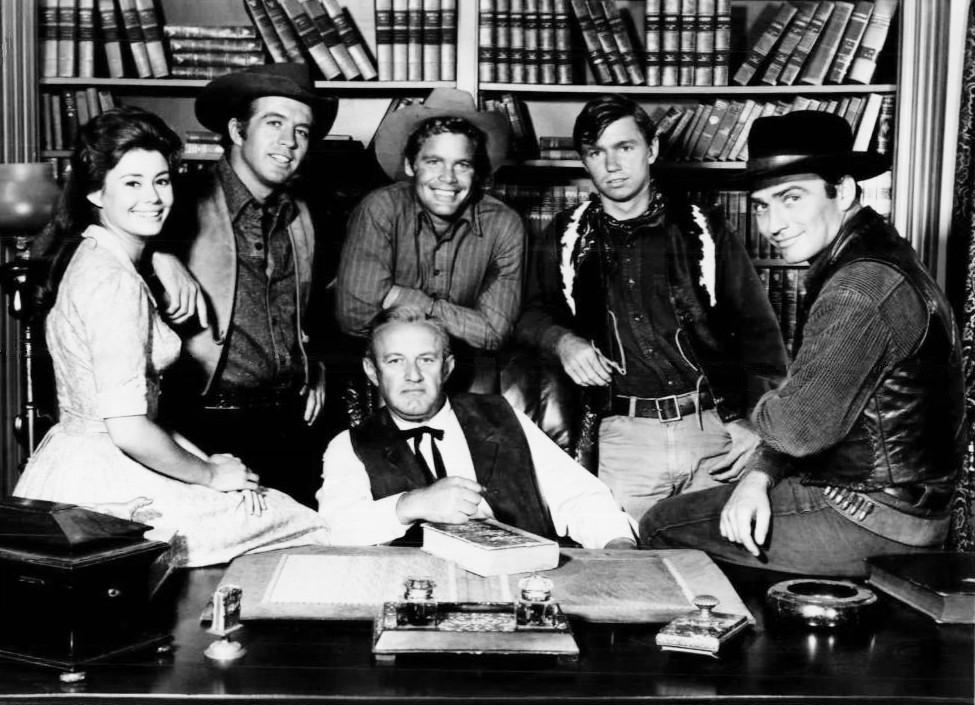
The main cast in the fall of 1964: Center: Lee J. Cobb (Judge Garth), from left: Roberta Shore (Betsy Garth), Clu Gulager (Emmett Ryker), Doug McClure (Trampas), Randy Boone (Randy Benton), James Drury (the Virginian)

Set in the late 19th century, and loosely based on The Virginian, A Horseman of the Plains, a 1902 novel by Owen Wister, the series revolved around the foreman of the Shiloh Ranch, played by Drury. His top hand, Trampas (McClure), was the only character to remain with the show for the entire run, although Ross Elliott, as Sheriff Abbott, recurred throughout the run, appearing in 61 episodes over nine years. As in the book, the foreman went only by the name "the Virginian". The series was set in Medicine Bow, Wyoming. Various references in the first season indicate that setting is 1898:

- In episode five, "The Brazen Bell", guest star George C. Scott quotes from Oscar Wilde's The Ballad of Reading Gaol, which was first published in 1898.
- In episode seven, "Riff Raff", several of the main characters join Theodore Roosevelt's Rough Riders, the volunteer cavalry unit formed in 1898 to fight in Cuba during the Spanish–American War.
- In episode 11, "The Devil's Children", the grave marker for one of the characters who dies in the episode states 1898 as the year of death.
- In episode 13, "The Accomplice", an 1898 calendar is present in the bunkhouse.

The series focused on the foreman's quest to maintain an orderly lifestyle at Shiloh Ranch. The ranch was named after the two-day American Civil War Battle of Shiloh, at Pittsburg Landing, Tennessee. The show's white Appaloosa was named Joe D., and Trampas' buckskin horse was named Buck.

Several cast changes were made throughout the program's run. In the first four seasons (1962–1966), the owner of the ranch was Judge Henry Garth (Cobb). His de facto daughter (Note: In episode 2 of season 1 ("Woman from White Wing"), Betsy's real father is identified as Garth's former friend Frank Dawson; when Dawson went to prison, Garth took custody of baby Betsy and never told her about her true background, and years later Dawson, who has come back to take her with him, chooses to leave Shiloh without telling her either.) Betsy (Roberta Shore) lived at the ranch with him, and had a sister relationship with the ranch hands. Ranch hand Steve Hill (Gary Clarke) joined in episode storylines. Randy Boone joined the show in the second season as Randy Benton, a youthful ranch hand who played guitar and sang duets with Betsy.

In 1965, Decca Records released an LP of songs from the two singing actors. In the episode "First to Thine Own Self" (February 12, 1964), Boone's character sings "I'm So Lonesome I Could Cry", written by Hank Williams in 1949.

In the third season, Clu Gulager, who had previously guest-starred twice in earlier seasons, was added to the show as deputy Emmett Ryker. At the end of season three, executive producer Frank Price was replaced by Norman Macdonnell. Conversely, season four's production was strained and troublesome. When Shore left the cast, Macdonnell added a new leading woman—Diane Roter, who played Jennifer, the judge's niece. When Cobb left the show in 1966, John Dehner, as Morgan Starr, was brought in as the manager of Shiloh when Judge Garth left to become the governor of Wyoming.

Producer Frank Price returned for season five. The characters of Randy, Morgan Starr, and Jennifer were subsequently replaced with characters of a more familiar tone. John Grainger (played by Charles Bickford) became the new owner. Elizabeth Grainger (played by Sara Lane), was John Grainger's granddaughter. Her brother Stacey (Don Quine) rounded out this new cast. Ranch rand Harper (played by Harper Flaherty) began being credited in the episodes since season six, which he appeared in over 32 credited episodes. Dick Shane, a stunt double for Drury's character, played as ranch hand Dick in over seven credited episodes.

Although Price later left again, the series continued smoothly in the pattern he set. Due to Charles Bickford's sudden death in November 1967, season six saw Clay Grainger (John McIntire), take ownership of Shiloh after his brother John's apparent departure "on business". The sixth season also added Holly Grainger (played by Jeanette Nolan, McIntire's real-life wife, with whom he often worked professionally) as Clay's wife. Season seven had the entrance of David Sutton, played by David Hartman. Sutton was replaced in season eight with a younger hand, Jim Horn (Tim Matheson).

=== Season 9 ===
The new The Men from Shiloh title card

In season 9 (1970–1971), the name of the program was changed to The Men from Shiloh and the look of the series was completely redesigned. Ownership of the Shiloh Ranch was changed once more, and Colonel Alan MacKenzie (Stewart Granger) took over. Also Lee Majors joined as a new character, Roy Tate, introduced in the fifth episode of the season. Granger said of his character:

They had some idea of Colonel Mackenzie against the West. I wanted no part of that. Englishmen were running cattle here from the beginning. The English have this thing for land; for animals and crops... I said this old cocker's out of India and the colonies: he can take the American West on his own terms.

In several countries, including the United Kingdom, the show went under the extended title The Virginian: Men from Shiloh.

A new opening theme song was composed by Ennio Morricone, and the look of the show was changed reflecting a style similar to spaghetti Westerns, which were popular at the time.

These changes brought a better ranking (number 18) in the top-30 primetime shows in the United States, after the previous year had the show slip out of the top-30 rankings for the first time. (It was one of only four Western series shown in primetime.)

The final season operated on a "rotating lead actor" basis of the four stars, with normally just one lead appearing each week. Two of the four leads (Lee Majors and Doug McClure) never appeared together in the last season. Shiloh itself played a very nominal part in season 9; most scripts featured the four stars away from the ranch. Little seemingly could save it, as the final season brought in several big guest stars to the remaining episodes. The studio and network were set on ending the series, as evidenced by rivals CBS and ABC making demographic moves away from rural-oriented shows (see "rural purge"). The final episode aired on March 24, 1971, ending the show's nine-season run.

== Characters ==
=== The Virginian ===
The Virginian
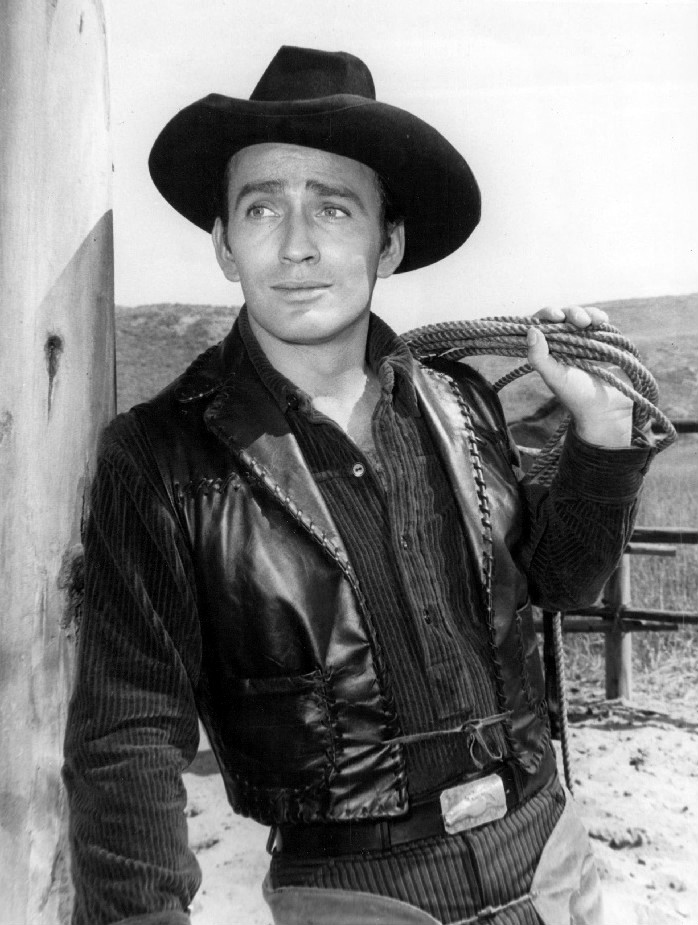
- James Drury as the Virginian in the Universal series by the same name
- First appearance: "The Executioners" (1962)
- Last appearance: "Jump-up" (1971)
- Created by: Owen Wister
- Portrayed by: James Drury

In-universe information
- Gender: Male
- Occupation: Foreman of the Shiloh Ranch in Medicine Bow, Wyoming

Played by James Drury, the Virginian was the tough foreman of the Shiloh Ranch. Based loosely on the character in the Owen Wister novel, he always stood his ground firmly. Respected by the town citizens and the hands of the ranch, he was a prominent figure in Medicine Bow. In the series, the Virginian is the ranch foreman from the first episode. This way, the producers were able to establish a feeling that he had been there for a while, thus keeping a consistent story line; this differed from the book, where he was the deputy foreman, eventually promoted to foreman. The Virginian usually wore a black hat, black leather vest, black boots, a maroon red shirt and a single right-handed holster and revolver. He often ordered Monongahela brand whiskey in saloons.

When making the show, the producers chose not to reveal the Virginian's real name, and little about his past was actually made known, making the Virginian an intriguing and mysterious character. The foreman worked under five ranch owners throughout the series: Judge Garth (Lee J. Cobb), Morgan Starr (John Dehner), John Grainger (Charles Bickford), Clay Grainger (John McIntire), and Colonel Alan Mackenzie (Stewart Granger). Drury was the only cast member to appear in the pilot (aired as an episode of the series Decision) and the entire nine season run of The Virginian, with McClure the only other cast member to remain with the show for all nine seasons of The Virginian, though not in the initial pilot.

=== Judge Garth ===
Lee J. Cobb's Judge Garth was portrayed as a stern man with a soft side to his personality, acting as a father figure to the Virginian. Respected by all the townspeople as well as his employees, Garth was often looked to as mediator for certain matters. Cobb left the series near the end of season four. In the episode "Morgan Starr", the character was stated to have left Shiloh to become governor of Wyoming. Garth had previously said he would leave Shiloh to his daughter Betsy in "The Hero" (season three, episode four).

=== Trampas ===
Played by Doug McClure, the character of Trampas took on a completely different personality from the character in the novel. In Wister's book, Trampas was a villain throughout the story and at the end was shot by the Virginian. In the series, producers chose to make Trampas a fun-loving and rowdy character; McClure fit the part perfectly. Trampas, a sandy-haired, rowdy cowhand who eventually settled down on the ranch, was by far the most developed character in the series, as compared to the minimal history on the title character. Several episodes were made detailing his past. McClure added a touch of light comedy to the series to counterbalance the Virginian's serious manner. For part of season 9, the Trampas character wore a thick mustache and broader brimmed hat.

=== Steve Hill ===
Played by Gary Clarke, Steve was a good friend of both Trampas' and the Virginian's. He was constantly getting Trampas in and out of his usual scrapes. The on-screen chemistry that Gary Clarke and Doug McClure possessed reflected a good friendship off screen, and was loved by fans worldwide. Although he was with the show at the beginning, Clarke was being phased out of the show at the end of season two, but remained as a guest star for a few episodes in season three, before departing permanently.

=== Betsy Garth ===
Played by Roberta Shore from seasons 1–4, Betsy was the only daughter of Judge Garth. Early in the series, she was made clear to be adopted, but nevertheless, the judge treated her as his own. Betsy and the ranch hands had a relationship similar to that of brother and sister. Trampas and Steve had a particular soft spot for her, often jumping to protect her, and looking out for her wellbeing. At the start of the series, Betsy was said to be 15 years old. In a season-four episode, "The Awakening", she married a minister (Glenn Corbett), and moved to Pennsylvania, reflecting Shore's departure from the show.

=== Randy Benton ===
Played by Randy Boone from seasons 2–4, Randy was a young ranch hand who played guitar and sang. He came into the show as Steve Hill was being phased out as a regular cast member. Before the new Grainger family was brought in for season five, his character was discontinued.

=== Deputy Sheriff Emmett Ryker ===
At the beginning of season three, a new cast regular was introduced. Clu Gulager played the restless deputy Emmett Ryker. Ryker was the first cast regular not to live on Shiloh. A former lawman turned hired gun, because the pay was better, Ryker decided to settle in Medicine Bow before he took his new profession too far. He was hired by Sheriff Abbott, with whom he had been acquainted, after solving the murder of a prominent rancher in the introductory episode "Ryker". He became the sheriff in season four. Gulager remained with the show for four seasons, leaving briefly at the beginning of season five, then returning for the rest of season five before leaving for good toward the end of season six.

=== Jennifer Sommers ===
After Roberta Shore's departure, Diane Roter was brought in as the judge's niece. At the end of season four, along with Boone and Dehner, she left, making room for the new owners.

=== Morgan Starr ===
Halfway through season four, Morgan Starr was brought in to run the ranch for Judge Garth because of Garth's appointment as governor of Wyoming. John Dehner played a tough and demanding man, who was hard to befriend, as the Virginian and Trampas soon found out. Fans disliked Dehner's character, and he left the show at the end of the season.

=== John Grainger ===
At the beginning of season five, with Judge Garth, Betsy, and Jennifer gone, a new character was brought in to run Shiloh. Charles Bickford played a stern but loving grandfather to his two grandchildren, Stacey and Elizabeth. Although the Virginian and Mr. Grainger never quite had the father–son relationship that the Virginian and Judge Garth had, they got along well. Charles Bickford's death on November 9, 1967, was a shock to the cast. He was replaced by John McIntire as his brother Clay.

=== Stacey Grainger ===
Played by Don Quine, Stacey Grainger, the grandson of John Grainger, lived at Shiloh, beginning in season five. He worked alongside Trampas, and the two become good friends. Stacey's sister Elizabeth looked up to him as a big brother, and he filled the role more than competently. Quine's two seasons on The Virginian were the only ones that finished in the Nielsen rating top-15 year-end rankings.

=== Elizabeth Grainger ===
Stacey's younger sister Elizabeth (Sara Lane) was the granddaughter of John Grainger, starting in season five. Trampas, the Virginian, and Stacey all looked out for her wellbeing. Elizabeth was cast as a teenage girl enjoying her life on the frontier. She loved horses, riding the range, and going to the ever-present Saturday-night dances. Sara Lane departed the series in season eight.

=== Clay Grainger ===
After the death of Charles Bickford, John McIntire was hired as his brother, Liz and Stacey's great uncle. Clay had a wife, Holly (Jeanette Nolan), and was the ranch owner for seasons five through eight. McIntire had earlier taken over the lead role in Wagon Train upon the death of Ward Bond, assuming the role of the new wagonmaster. In season 9, The Virginian was revamped, and McIntire, along with Nolan, Lane, David Hartman, and Tim Matheson, left the show.

=== Harper ===
Played by Harper Flaherty. He was a ranch hand in the Shiloh bunk house. He began being credited in the episodes since season six, and was a stunt double for McClure's character. He originally played uncredited roles in the series. He was credited in almost every episode from season six to season eight.

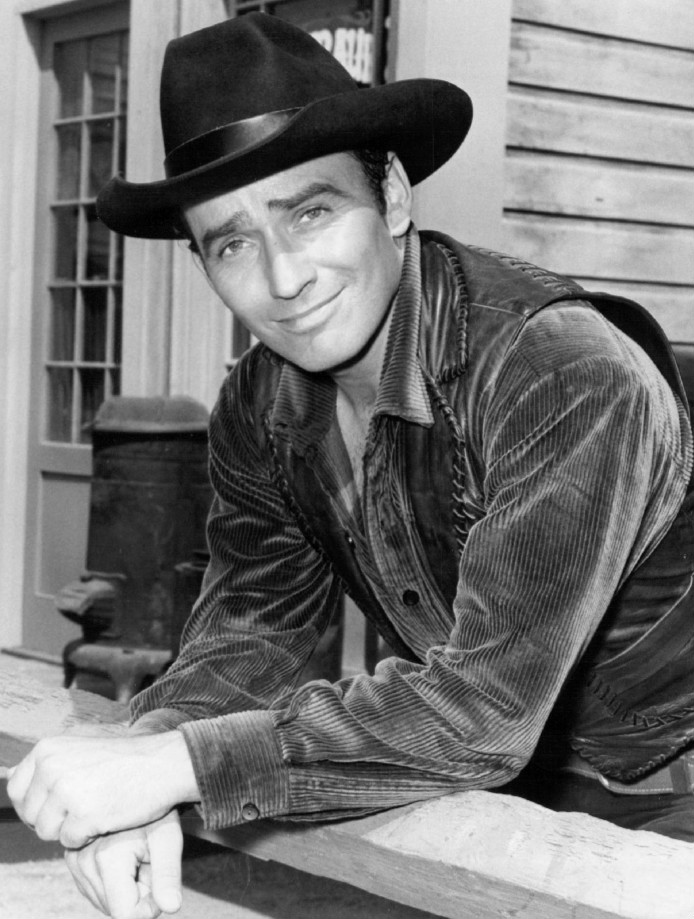
James Drury as the Virginian

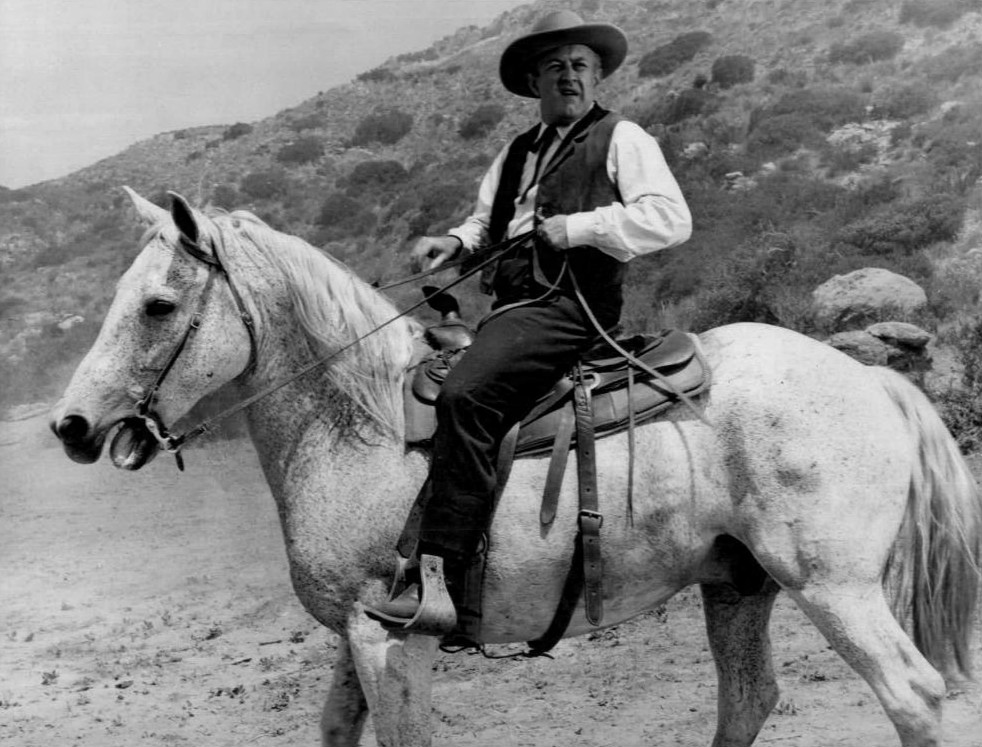
Lee J. Cobb as Judge Garth

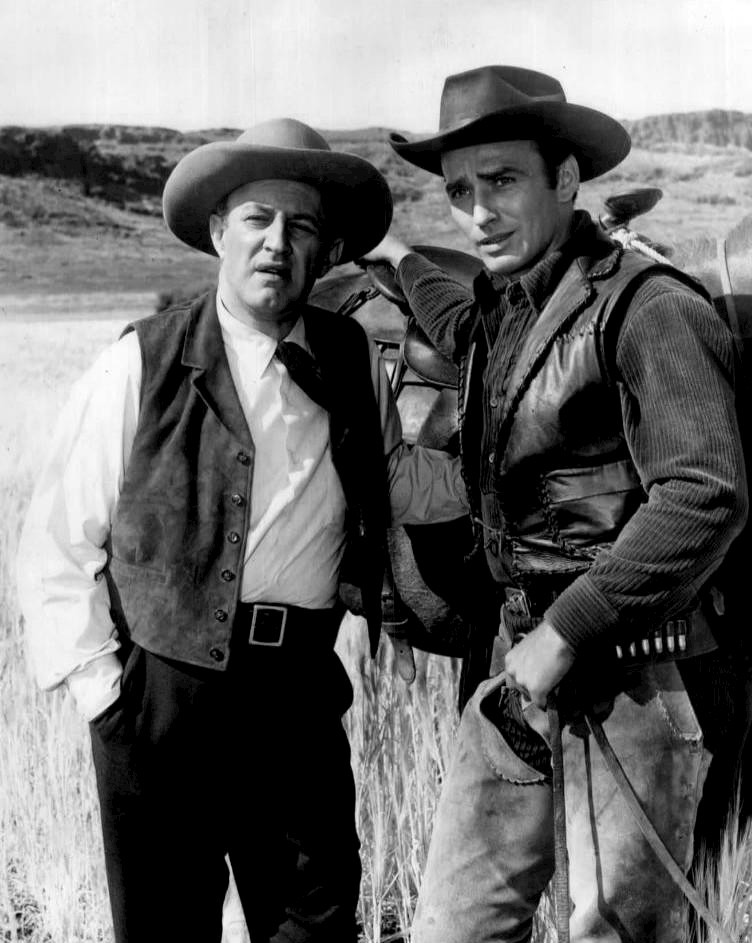
Lee J. Cobb and James Drury

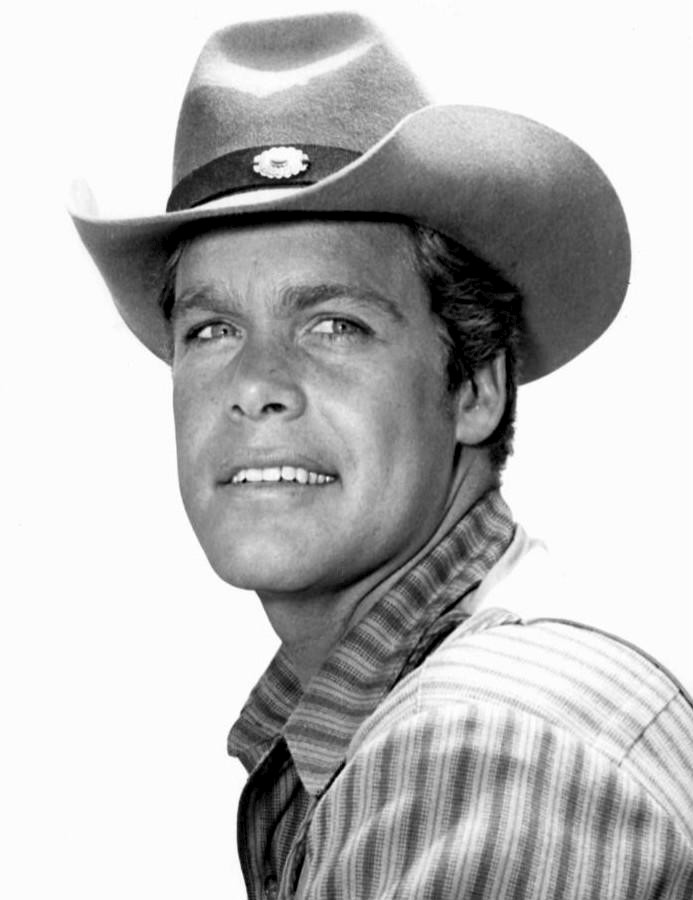
Doug McClure as Trampas

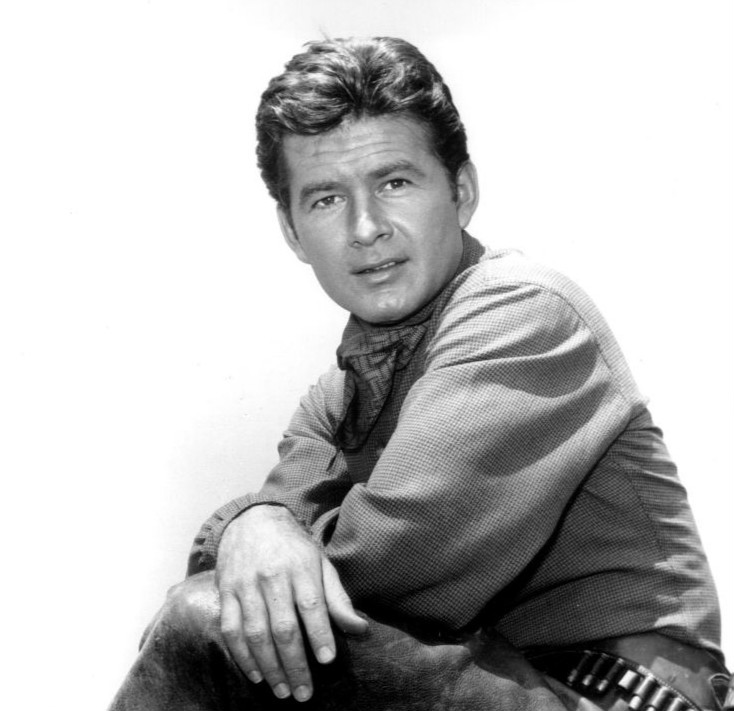
Gary Clarke as Steve Hill

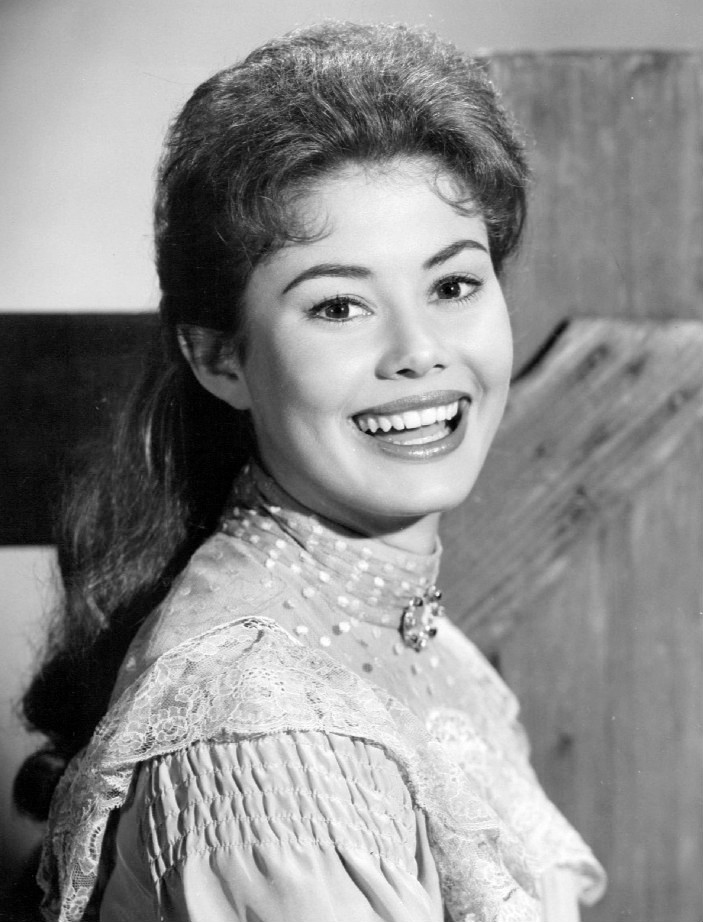
Roberta Shore as Betsy Garth

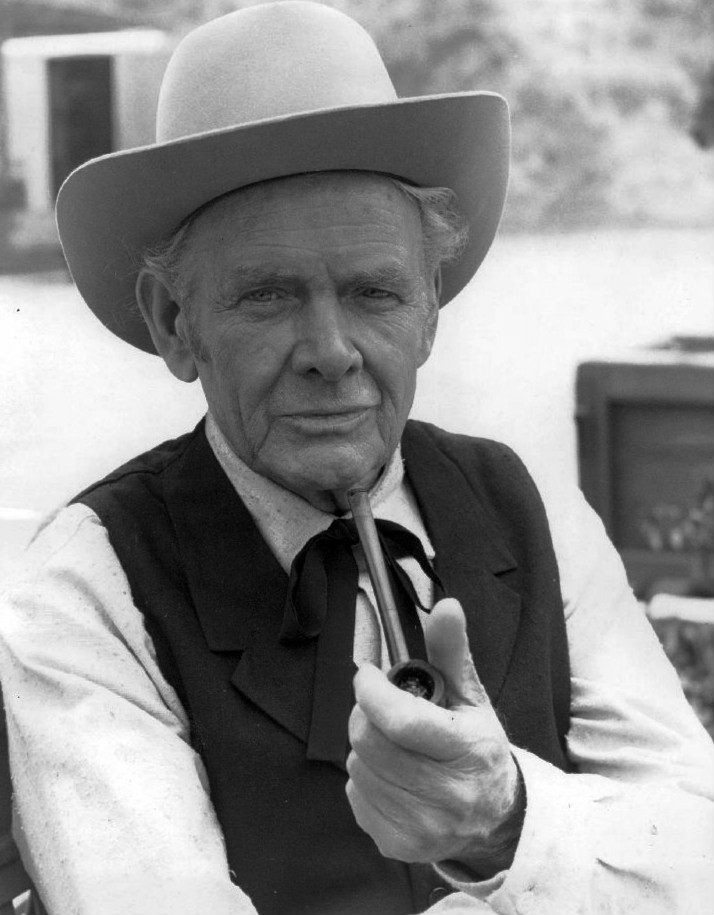
Charles Bickford as John Grainger

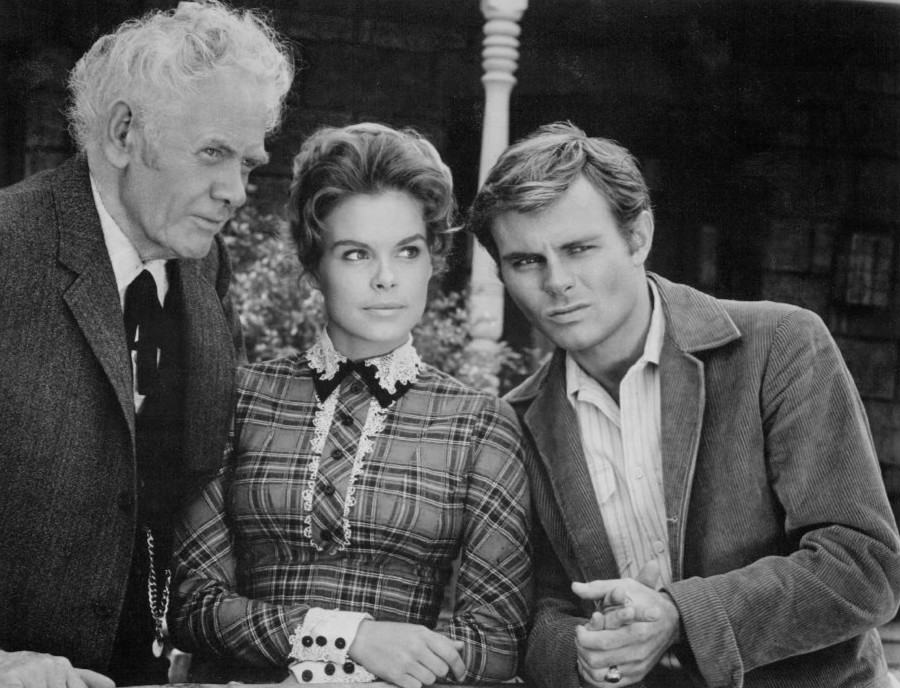
Stacey (Don Quine) and Elizabeth (Sara Lane) Grainger with their grandfather

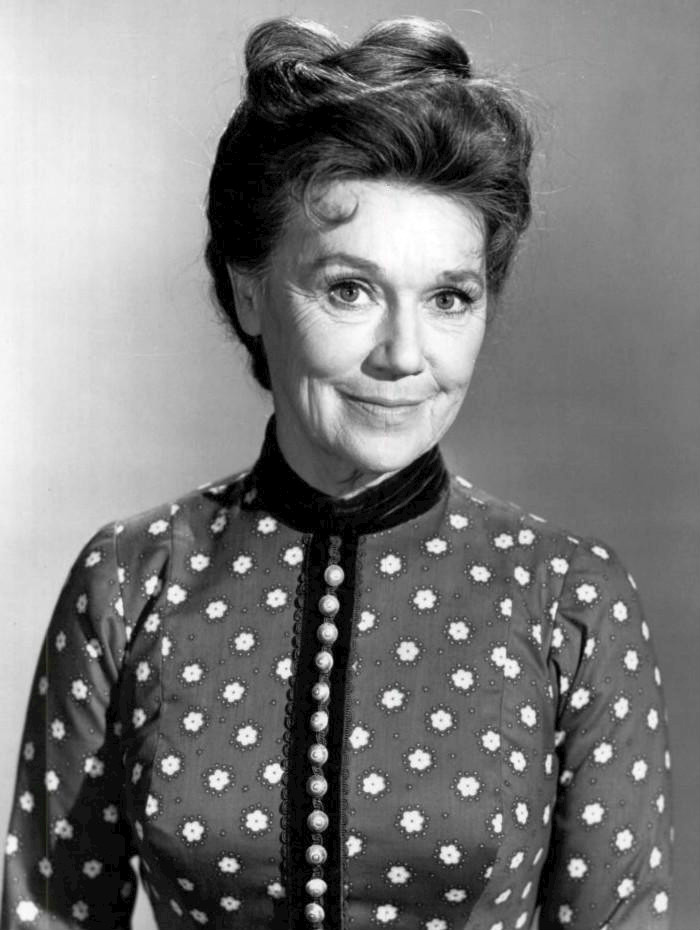
Jeannette Nolan as Clay Grainger's wife, Holly

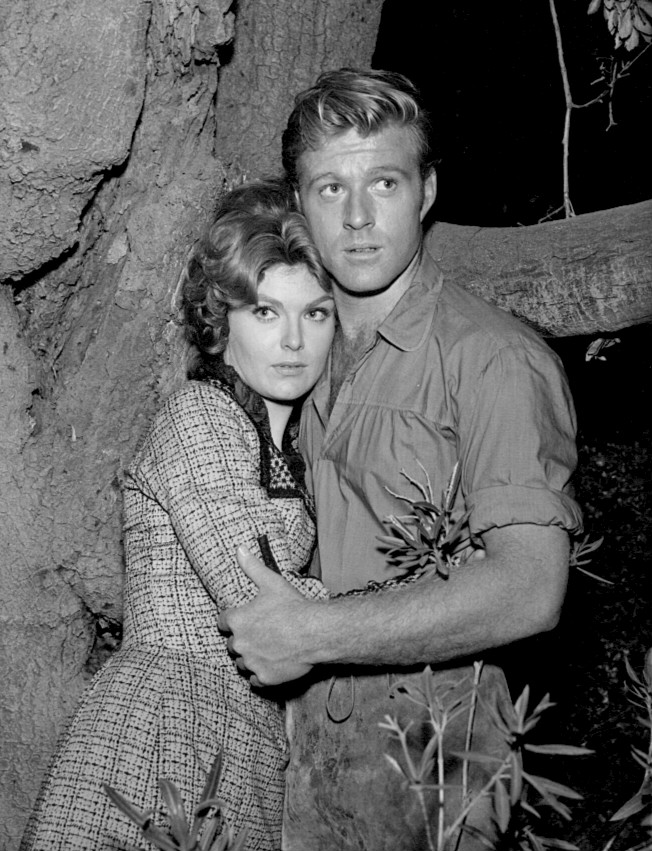
Robert Redford and Patricia Blair, 1964 episode

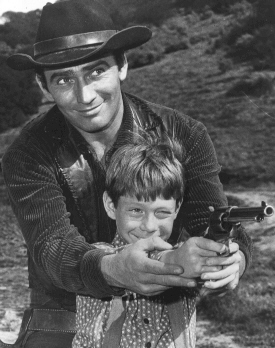
James Drury and Billy Mumy

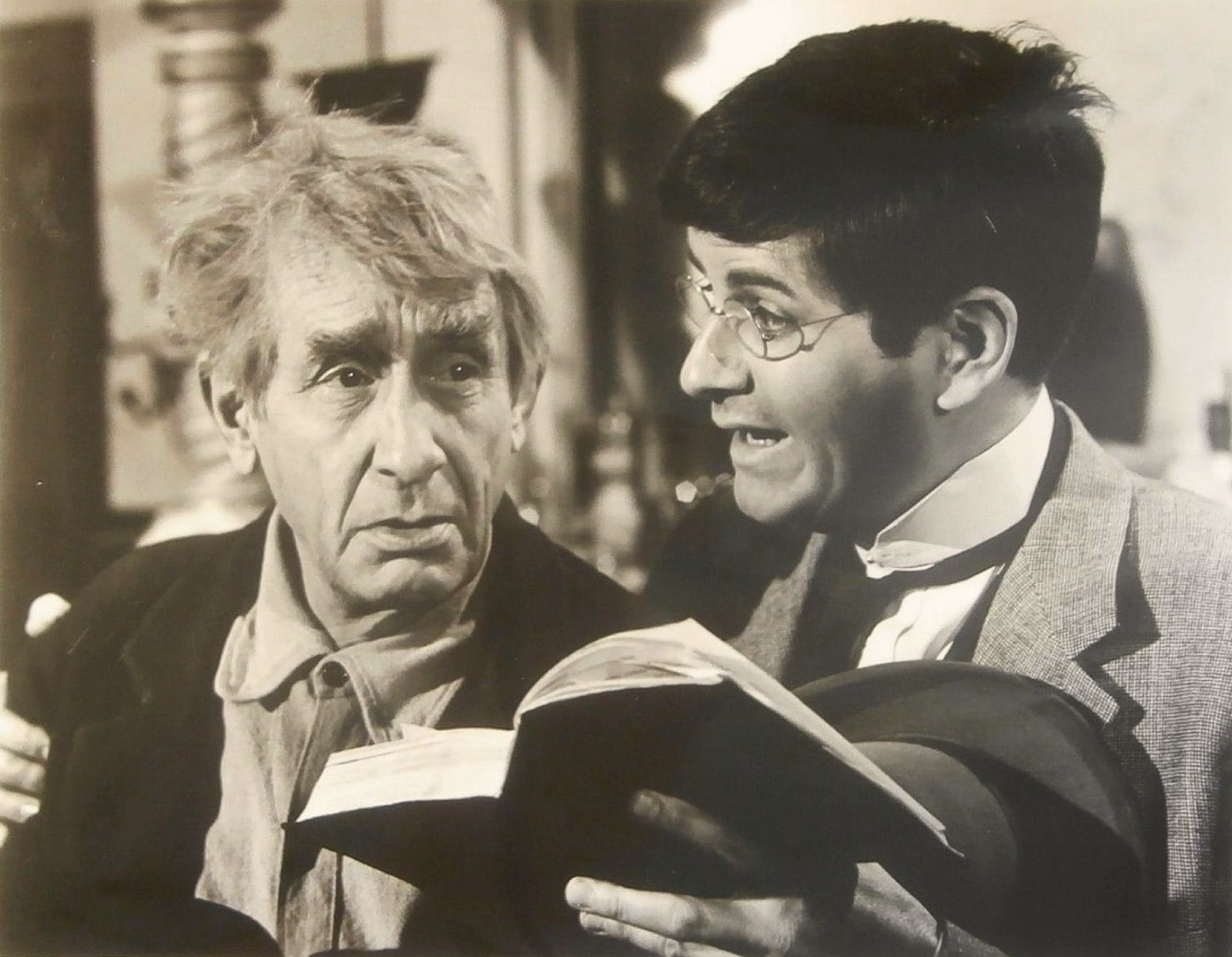
Victor Jory and Linden Chiles

== Episodes ==
Season	Episodes	Originally released	
Season	Episodes	First released	Last released
1	30	September 19, 1962	May 1, 1963
2	30	September 18, 1963	May 6, 1964
3	30	September 16, 1964	April 21, 1965
4	30	September 15, 1965	April 20, 1966
5	29	September 14, 1966	April 12, 1967
6	26	September 13, 1967	March 20, 1968
7	26	September 18, 1968	April 9, 1969
8	24	September 17, 1969	March 18, 1970
9	24	September 16, 1970	March 24, 1971

The Virginian aired Wednesday at 7:30–9:00 pm on NBC for its entire run.

== Reception ==
=== Ratings ===
Season	Rank	Rating
1962–1963	#26	21.7
1963–1964	#17	24.0
1964–1965	#22	24.0
1965–1966	#23	22.0 (Tied with The Wild Wild West and The Jackie Gleason Show)
1966–1967	#10	22.8 (Tied with Gomer Pyle, U.S.M.C., The Lawrence Welk Show and The Ed Sullivan Show)
1967–1968	#14	22.9
1968–1969	#17	21.8
1969–1970	Not in the Top 30	
1970–1971	#18	21.2

=== Legacy ===
Drury was an active advocate of the series since the end of the original airings. He traveled across the United States, Ireland, and several other countries, appearing in Western-themed conventions, festivals, celebrations, news programs, and TV specials to promote The Virginian. Along with Gary Clarke and Roberta Shore, he participated in interviews for the Encore Westerns channel. Drury also reunited with key cast members Randy Boone, Gary Clarke, and Roberta Shore at these events.

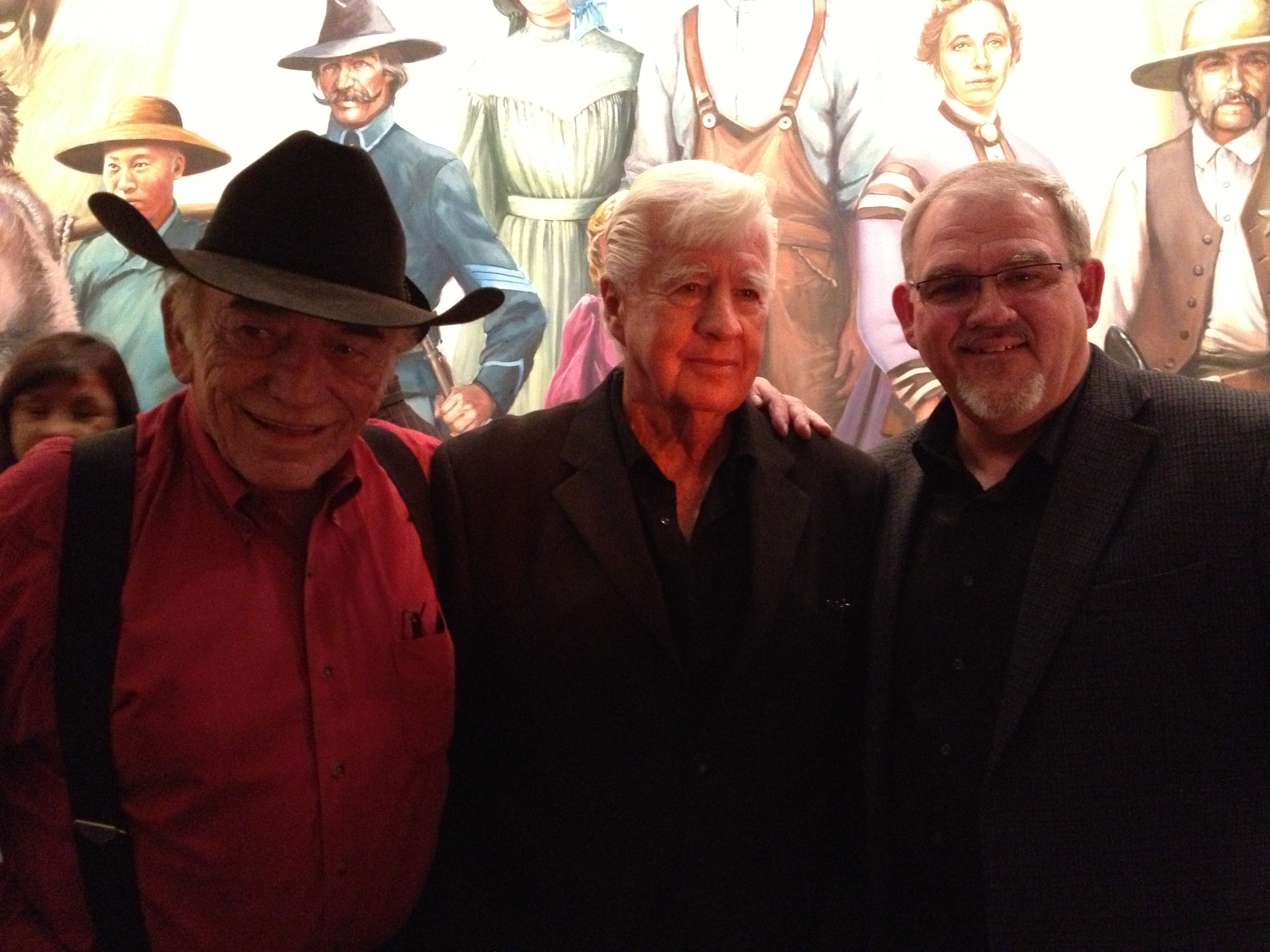
James Drury, Clu Gulager, and Doug Butts (SVP of Programming, INSP)

In 2012, Drury also reunited with L. Q. Jones, Clu Gulager, Diane Roter, Sara Lane, and Don Quine in addition to Boone, Clarke, and Shore. Three events were held to celebrate the 50th anniversary of The Virginian, at the Memphis Film Festival on May 31, 2012, the Western Legends Roundup on August 16, 2012, and the Autry National Center and Museum on September 22, 2012. During the 50th-anniversary event, INSP, the exclusive cable home to current reruns of "The Virginian" filmed content with the surviving cast to use in the "Cast Favorites Marathon", which continues to be aired several times each year. In 2017, INSP began airing The Men from Shiloh during their Saddle Up Weekends programming block.

== Filming locations ==
- Western streets in the backlot of Universal City, California
- Iverson Movie Ranch, Chatsworth, California
- Lone Pine, California
- Pollock Pines, California (Ghost Mountain Ranch)
- Bronson Canyon, Griffith Park Los Angeles, California
- CBS Studio Center Los Angeles
- Albertson Movie Ranch, Ventura County, California

== Spin-offs ==
In April 1965, an episode of The Virginian titled "We've Lost a Train" served as a backdoor pilot for the TV series Laredo.

== Syndication ==
The cable channels of Encore Westerns, MoviePlex, and RetroPlex began airing complete, uncut commercial free episodes of The Virginian starting with a premier marathon in January 2010 and ending in December 2011. Seasons one through eight were shown.

The Inspiration Network cable channel began a three-year agreement to run The Virginian starting with a marathon of episodes on September 22, 2012, to celebrate the 50th anniversary of the show. Cozi TV, the NBCUniversal classic television digital specialty network, began airing episodes in 2013. The show later returned to Encore Westerns and continues to air every weekday; a marathon of Drury-centric episodes was run shortly after his death in April 2020.

== Home media ==
Timeless Media Group (under license from NBCUniversal) has released all seasons of The Virginian on DVD in Region 1. All episodes on all releases have been fully restored and digitally remastered in full color and are available in special collectors' edition tin cases. They also each include a bonus disk with interviews from the actors.

Euro Video of Germany released season one, part one, in Germany, on October 14, 2010. Season one, part two, was released June 16, 2011. The release is presented with original English audio with German subtitles, as well as a German-dubbed soundtrack.

Acorn Media UK released the first season of The Virginian on DVD in the UK on April 4, 2011. The DVD also contains an interview with James Drury.

DVD name	Ep #	Release date
The Complete First Season	30	May 25, 2010
The Complete Second Season	30	December 21, 2010
The Complete Third Season	30	March 15, 2011
The Complete Fourth Season	30	May 17, 2011
The Complete Fifth Season	29	October 25, 2011
The Complete Sixth Season	26	May 1, 2012
The Complete Seventh Season	26	February 5, 2013
The Complete Eighth Season	24	July 16, 2013
The Final Season: The Men from Shiloh	24	October 25, 2011

== Translations of the title ==
- Germany: Die Leute von der Shiloh Ranch
- French: Le Virginien
- Spanish: El Virginiano
- Swedish: Mannen från Virginia
- Finnish: Virginialainen
- Italian: Il virginiano

== Other media ==
Gold Key Comics published a single issue of a comic book tie-in in summer 1963.

Transogram published a board game in 1962.

== See also ==
- 1962–63 United States network television schedule
