= Laredo (TV series) =

American Western television series

- Title card
- Genre: Western
- Starring: Neville Brand; William Smith; Peter Brown; Philip Carey
- Theme music composer: Russell Garcia
- Composer: Stanley Wilson
- Country of origin: United States
- Original language: English
- No. of seasons: 2
- No. of episodes: 56

Production
- Camera setup: Single-camera
- Running time: 60 minutes
- Production company: Universal Television

Original release
- Network: NBC
- Release: September 16, 1965 – April 7, 1967

Related
- The Virginian

Laredo is an American Western television series that aired on NBC from 1965 to 1967, starring Neville Brand, William Smith, Peter Brown, and Philip Carey as Texas Rangers. It is set on the Mexican border around Laredo in Webb County in South Texas. The program presented 56 episodes in color. It was produced by Universal Television. The series has a comic element, but like another NBC series that premiered in 1965, The Wackiest Ship in the Army, it was an hour in length, had no laugh track, and characters were frequently killed, thus going against three unofficial rules for sitcoms at the time.

The pilot episode of Laredo aired in 1965 on NBC's The Virginian under the title "We've Lost a Train". In 1969, the pilot was released theatrically under the title Backtrack. Three episodes from the series were edited into the 1968 feature film Three Guns for Texas.

== Synopsis ==
The series were about three members of the Texas Rangers and their commander Captain Parmalee, who didn't approve of the Rangers jokes and pranks. The time period was after the Civil War.

Reese Bennett was a former Union Army office in his forties when he joined the Texas Rangers. Joe Riley was an ex-gunfighter when he joined for both adventure and sanctuary from lawmen outside of Texas. Chad Cooper was from Boston, and had been a member of the Border Patrol during the Civil War. At the beginning of the second season Erik Hunter became a new Ranger, who wore "outlandish outfits" which were not typical of how other Texas Rangers dressed.

Peter Brown, who played Chad Cooper, recalled that the producers of the show wanted the three stars to have the same relationship and camaraderie as did the stars of Gunga Din, and had Brand, Brown, and Smith watch the film three times.

== Cast ==
Neville Brand, Peter Brown, William Smith and Philip Carey (L to R)

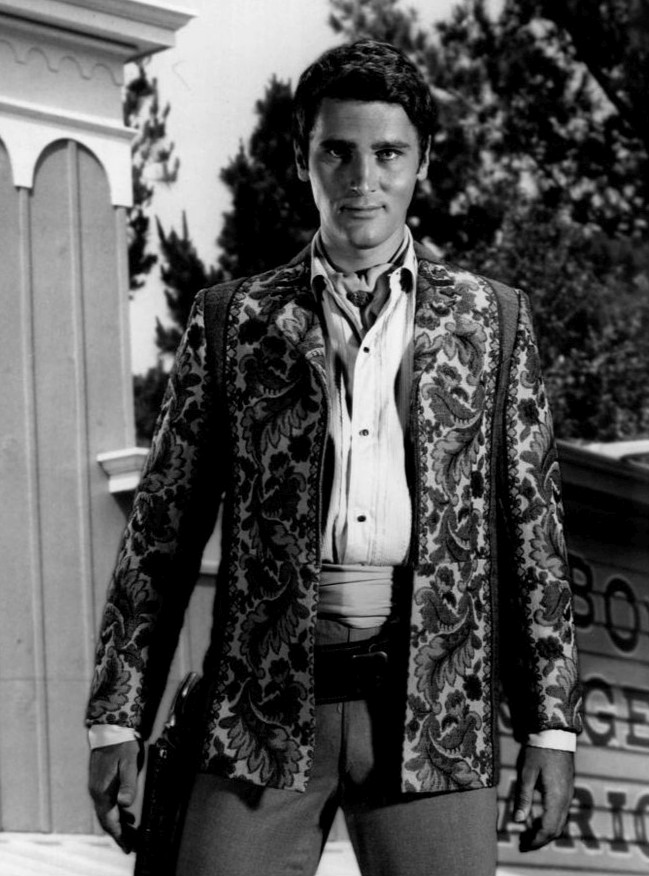
Robert Wolders

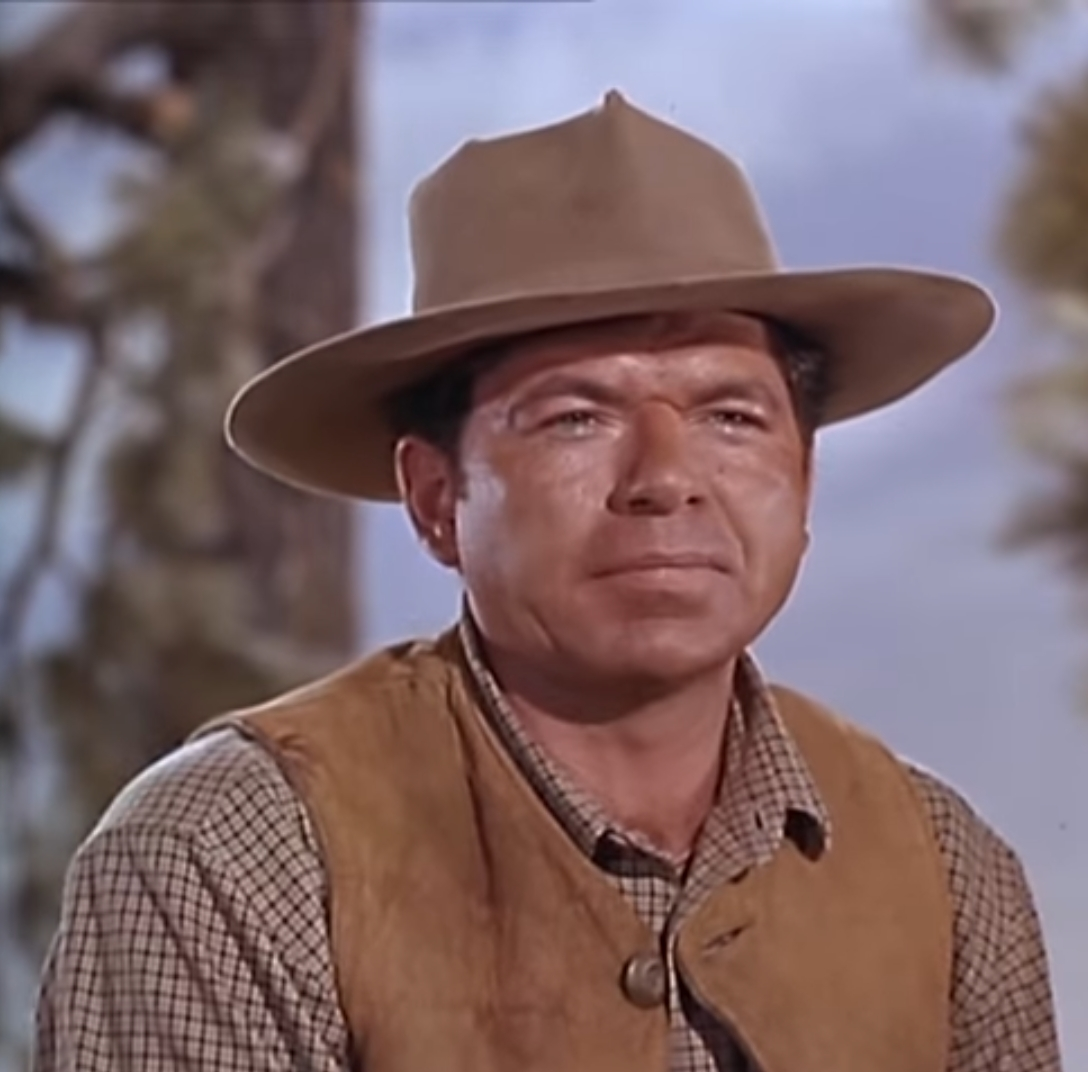
Claude Akins

=== Main cast ===
- Neville Brand as Reese Bennett
- Peter Brown as Chad Cooper
- William Smith as Joe Riley
- Philip Carey as Captain Edward Parmalee
- Robert Wolders as Erik Hunter (26 episodes, 1966–1967)
- Claude Akins as Cotton Buckmeister (5 episodes, 1966–1967)

=== Guest cast ===
- Mario Alcalde
- Eve Arden
- Rayford Barnes
- X Brands
- Chad & Jeremy
- Ahna Capri
- John Cliff
- Sidney Clute
- Richard Collier
- Bill Coontz
- Ellen Corby
- Robert O. Cornthwaite
- Bruce Dern
- Richard Devon
- Mimsy Farmer
- Shug Fisher
- Duke Fishman
- Harper Flaherty
- Byron Foulger
- Gina Gillespie
- Leo Gordon
- James Griffith
- Chick Hannan
- Julie Harris
- Myron Healey
- Carol Henry
- Bern Hoffman
- Rex Holman
- Clyde Howdy
- Hoke Howell
- Rodolfo Hoyos Jr.
- I. Stanford Jolley
- DeForest Kelley
- Ray Kellogg
- Jack Kelly (2 episodes)
- George Kennedy
- Jess Kirkpatrick
- Fred Krone
- Fernando Lamas
- Norman Leavitt
- Jack Lord
- Ken Lynch
- Ted Mapes
- Marlyn Mason
- Ken Mayer
- Rod McGaughy
- Troy Melton
- Mort Mills
- Shelley Morrison
- Stuart Nisbet
- Cliff Osmond
- Gregg Palmer
- Robert Phillips
- William Phipps
- Mike Ragan (3 episodes)
- Donnelly Rhodes
- Roy Roberts
- Diane Roter
- Kurt Russell
- Cosmo Sardo
- Tom Simcox
- Robert F. Simon
- Dub Taylor
- Lyle Talbot
- Jack Tornek
- Arthur Tovey
- Lee Van Cleef
- Doodles Weaver
- Jack Weston

== Episodes ==
=== Season 1 (1965–66) ===
No. overall	No. in season	Title	Directed by	Written by	Original release date
1	1	"Lazyfoot, Where Are You?"	Paul Stanley	Story by : Lewis Reed & Calvin Clements; Teleplay by : Calvin Clements	September 16, 1965
2	2	"I See By Your Outfit"	Harvey Hart	John D.F. Black	September 23, 1965
3	3	"Yahoo"	David Lowell Rich	John D.F. Black	September 30, 1965
4	4	"Rendezvous at Arillo"	Harvey Hart	Calvin Clements	October 7, 1965
5	5	"Three's Company"	Bernard McEveety	John McGreevey	October 14, 1965
6	6	"Anybody Here Seen Billy?"	Lawrence Dobkin	John McGreevey	October 21, 1965
7	7	"A Question of Discipline"	R.G. Springsteen	Archie Lawrence	October 28, 1965
8	8	"The Golden Trail"	Earl Bellamy	Gene L. Coon & Bloise N. Coon	November 4, 1965
9	9	"A Matter of Policy"	R.G. Springsteen	Edward J. Lasko	November 11, 1965
10	10	"Which Way Did They Go?"	Leon Benson	Gerry Day	November 18, 1965
11	11	"Jinx"	Paul Stanley	John D.F. Black	December 2, 1965
12	12	"The Land Grabbers"	R.G. Springsteen	Ric Hardman	December 9, 1965
13	13	"The Pride of the Rangers"	Tony Leader	John McGreevey	December 16, 1965
14	14	"The Heroes of San Gill"	Paul Stanley	Calvin Clements	December 23, 1965
15	15	"A Medal for Reese"	Lawrence Dobkin	Story by : Edward J. Lasko & George Bast; Teleplay by : Edward J. Lasko	December 30, 1965
16	16	"The Calico Kid"	Lawrence Dobkin	Story by : S.S. Schweitzer; Teleplay by : Gene L. Coon	January 6, 1966
17	17	"Above the Law"	Richard Benedict	John McGreevey	January 13, 1966
18	18	"That's Noway, Thataway"	Howard Morris	Vincent Bogert & Gene L. Coon	January 20, 1966
19	19	"Limit of the Law Larkin"	William Witney	Ric Hardman	January 27, 1966
20	20	"Meanwhile Back at the Reservation"	Bernard McEveety	John D.F. Black	February 10, 1966
21	21	"The Treasure of San Diablo"	William Witney	Story by : Gerry Day & B.W. Sandefur; Teleplay by : Gerry Day	February 17, 1966
22	22	"No Bugles, One Drum"	Earl Bellamy	John D.F. Black	February 24, 1966
23	23	"Miracle at Massacre Mission"	Bernard McEveety	John T. Dugan	March 3, 1966
24	24	"It's the End of the Road, Stanley"	Leon Benson	Gene L. Coon	March 10, 1966
25	25	"A Very Small Assignment"	Paul Stanley	Edward J. Lasko	March 17, 1966
26	26	"Quarter Past Eleven"	Irving J. Moore	John D.F. Black	March 24, 1966
27	27	"The Deadliest Kid in the West"	Leon Benson	Gerry Day	March 31, 1966
28	28	"Sound of Terror"	William Witney	John McGreevey	April 7, 1966
29	29	"The Would-Be Gentleman of Laredo"	Earl Bellamy	John T. Dugan	April 14, 1966
30	30	"A Taste of Money"	William Witney	John D.F. Black	April 28, 1966

=== Season 2 (1966–67) ===
No. overall	No. in season	Title	Directed by	Written by	Original release date
31	1	"The Legend of Midas Mantee"	Hollingsworth Morse	Gerry Day & B.W. Sandefur	September 16, 1966
32	2	"The Dance of the Laughing Death"	Jerry Hopper	Fred Freiberger	September 23, 1966
33	3	"A Double Shot of Nepenthe"	Abner Biberman	Gene L. Coon	September 30, 1966
34	4	"Coup de Grace"	R.G. Springsteen	William Raynor & Myles Wilder	October 7, 1966
35	5	"The Land Slickers"	Sherman Marks	William Hellinger & Clint Young	October 14, 1966
36	6	"Finnegan"	Alexander Singer	Edward J. Lasko	October 21, 1966
37	7	"Any Way the Wind Blows"	John English	John McGreevey	October 28, 1966
38	8	"The Sweet Gang"	Ezra Stone	Walter Black	November 4, 1966
39	9	"One Too Many Voices"	William Witney	John McGreevey	November 18, 1966
40	10	"Road to San Remo"	Irving J. Moore	Calvin Clements	November 25, 1966
41	11	"The Last of the Caesars - Absolutely"	R.G. Springsteen	Story by : Jay Simms; Teleplay by : Joseph Bonaduce & Jay Simms	December 2, 1966
42	12	"A Prince of a Ranger"	Charles R. Rondeau	Joseph Bonaduce	December 9, 1966
43	13	"Oh Careless Love"	Charles R. Rondeau	Gilbert Ralston	December 23, 1966
44	14	"Leave It to Dixie"	Abner Biberman	Marty Roth	December 30, 1966
45	15	"The Seventh Day"	Irving J. Moore	Story by : Alvin Boretz; Teleplay by : Joel Murcott	January 6, 1967
46	16	"Scourge of San Rosa"	Joseph Pevney	Calvin Clements	January 20, 1967
47	17	"The Short, Happy Fatherhood of Reese Bennett"	Ezra Stone	Leonard Praskins & Barbara Merlin	January 27, 1967
48	18	"The Bitter Yen of General Ti"	Charles R. Rondeau	John T. Dugan	February 3, 1967
49	19	"The Other Cheek"	Ezra Stone	Gene L. Coon	February 10, 1967
50	20	"Enemies and Brothers"	Gene Nelson	Story by : Tom Adair & John Elliotte; Teleplay by : Brian Barstu and Tom Adair & John Elliotte	February 17, 1967
51	21	"Hey Diddle Diddle"	William Witney	Gerry Day	February 24, 1967
52	22	"The Small Chance Ghost"	Richard Bartlett	Marty Roth	March 3, 1967
53	23	"A Question of Guilt"	Leo Penn	Joseph Bonaduce	March 10, 1967
54	24	"Like One of the Family"	Robert Gist	John McGreevey	March 24, 1967
55	25	"Walk Softly"	William Witney	Edward J. Lasko	March 31, 1967
56	26	"Split the Difference"	Alan Rafkin	Paul Mason	April 7, 1967

== Selected episodes ==
In "The Golden Trail", Jeanette Nolan is cast as Ma Burns, who investigates the progress of a gold shipment that Reese Bennett is supposedly transporting from St. Louis to Laredo. Jim Davis appears in this episode as a sheriff. Nolan also appeared as Martha Tuforth in "It's the End of the Road, Stanley" (1966) and as Vita Rose in "Like One of the Family" (1967).

Lane Bradford was cast five times in different roles, as Three-finger Jake in "Rendezvous at Arillo" and as Amos Slaughter in "Which Way Did They Go?" (both 1965), as Ben Slick in "The Treasure of San Diablo" and as Charley Smith in "Road to San Remo" (both 1966), and as Lyle in "Walk Softly" (1967).

== DVD releases ==
Timeless Media Group released the entire series on DVD in Region 1 on November 24, 2009. The 12-disc boxed set features all 56 episodes of the series, as well as bonus features.

== Other media ==
Gold Key Comics published a single issue comic book tie-in in 1966.
