= Berlin Express =

1948 film by Jacques Tourneur

- Theatrical release poster
- Directed by: Jacques Tourneur
- Screenplay by: Harold Medford
- Story by: Curt Siodmak
- Produced by: Bert Granet
- Starring: Merle Oberon; Robert Ryan; Charles Korvin; Paul Lukas
- Narrated by: Paul Stewart
- Cinematography: Lucien Ballard
- Edited by: Sherman Todd
- Music by: Frederick Hollander
- Distributed by: RKO Pictures
- Release date: May 7, 1948 (United States)
- Running time: 87 minutes
- Country: United States
- Language: English

Berlin Express is a 1948 American drama film starring Merle Oberon, Robert Ryan, Charles Korvin, and Paul Lukas, and directed by Jacques Tourneur.

Thrown together by chance, a group of people search post-World War II Frankfurt for a kidnapped German peace activist. Set in Allied-occupied Germany, it was shot on location in Frankfurt (with exterior and interior shots of the IG Farben Building and its paternoster elevators) and Berlin. One of a small handful of American-made Trümmerfilms (rubble films), it features a full-screen notice during the opening credits reading: "Actual scenes in Frankfurt and Berlin were photographed by authorization of the United States Army of Occupation, the British Army of Occupation, and the Soviet Army of Occupation."

== Plot ==
In post World War II Paris, various passengers board a secure U.S. Army train to Frankfurt. They include American, Russian, British, French, and German diplomats, scientists, military personnel, and others cleared to make the passage.

A German tries to become better acquainted with the other passengers, but they all rebuff his overtures because of his nationality. When a British man on board, Sterling, comes to believe he is Dr. Heinrich Bernhardt, a prominent diplomat working to restore a peaceful Germany, the atmosphere immediately changes for most. After retiring to his compartment, the man is killed by a bomb. While the others are questioned upon arrival in Frankfurt, they learn that the dead man was actually one of the doctor's bodyguards. The real Bernhardt had been posing as anonymous passenger, traveling with his secretary, Lucienne, an attractive, younger French woman.

At the busy Frankfurt railway station Bernhardt greets Walther, an old, trusted friend. Before anybody realizes what has happened, he is kidnapped. The U.S. Army quickly institutes a search of the city, but when Lucienne begs her fellow travelers to help look for him, they initially decline. One by one, however, they reconsider.

Lucienne suggests they find Walther, unaware that he has betrayed Bernhardt in order to secure his detained wife's return. When they get to his home, they discover Walther has hanged himself in the trauma of having learned his wife had been dead all along.

The group splits up to cover the city. Lindley accompanies Lucienne to various German-only nightclubs. At one, Lindley notices a woman smoking an unusually long cigarette, just like the ones Bernhardt has made specially for him. He picks up a discarded butt and shows Lucienne that it has Bernhardt’s monogram on it. When the woman turns out to be an entertainer, a “mind-reader”, Lindley asks her where Bernhardt is. She flees, and her assistant prevents Lindley from following her. When Lindley and Lucienne question the American soldier who had been with the woman beforehand, Sergeant Barnes, he reluctantly agrees to lead them to her home.

When they arrive at an abandoned brewery, Barnes turns out to be working with the kidnappers. Bernhardt is being held prisoner, and Lindley and Lucienne are taken captive. An undercover agent assigned to protecting Bernhard had trailed the others to the hideout. He is shot when he is discovered but manages to get away and inform authorities of the location of the hideout, and turns out to be German train traveler Hans Schmidt. American soldiers break in just as Bernhardt and Lucienne are about to be shot and free the three unharmed. Kessler, the ringleader, is chased by Perrot, a Frenchman from the train and part of the search party. In a room alone together, Perrot shoots him dead after revealing that he is actually a German collaborator usurping Kessler's position.

The passengers board the connecting train for Berlin. Perrot suggests that each of them take turns guarding Bernhardt in his compartment. He volunteers to be first. Uneasy, Lindley pieces together various clues suspecting Perrot, but they are dismissed by the others. At a stop Lindley sees a reflection of Perrot strangling Bernhardt in the window of an adjacent train and saves his life. Perrot is gunned down as he tries to escape.

The rest of the group are driven to the Brandenburg Gate for transit to their respective destinations in Berlin. Seeing them depart, Bernhardt wonders if there can be cooperation between nations, and after despairing observes camaraderie between the once fractious British, American, and Russian men as they say their goodbyes. His hope is restored.

== Cast ==
- Merle Oberon as Lucienne Mirbeau
- Robert Ryan as Robert Lindley
- Charles Korvin as Henri Perrot
- Paul Lukas as Dr. Heinrich Bernhardt
- Robert Coote as James Sterling
- Reinhold Schünzel as Walther
- Roman Toporow as Lt. Maxim Viroshilov
- Peter von Zerneck as Hans Schmidt
- Otto Waldis as Kessler
- Fritz Kortner as Franzen
- Michael Harvey as Sgt. Barnes
- Tom Keene as Major
- Charles McGraw as USFET Col. Johns
- Marle Hayden as Maja the Mind Reader
- Paul Stewart as Narrator (uncredited)

== Production ==
According to Eddie Muller, a Turner Classic Movies host, Merle Oberon insisted on Lucien Ballard, her husband, being the cinematographer because he had developed techniques to hide facial scars she had as a result of a car accident.

Muller also noted that this was the first Hollywood production filmed on location in post-war Berlin, beating out A Foreign Affair.

== Reception ==
In The New York Times, A. H. Weiler gave the film a positive review, stating the film's photography of the post-war landscape creates a "realistic, awesome and impressive vista". After lukewarm praise for the film's plot, he writes, "...it is the panoramic and close views of life amid the 'new architecture' of Frankfort and Berlin — 'early Twentieth Century modern warfare' architecture — which gives the adventure the authentic impact of a documentary."

The staff at Variety magazine was also enthusiastic, writing, "[The m]ost striking feature of this production is its extraordinary background of war-ravaged Germany. With a documentary eye, this film etches a powerfully grim picture of life amidst the shambles. It makes awesome and exciting cinema...Ryan establishes himself as a first-rate actor in this film, demonstrating conclusively that his brilliant performance in Crossfire was no one-shot affair." Variety, however, did criticize the screenplay for "its failure to break away from the formula of anti-Nazi films."

On the review aggregator website Rotten Tomatoes, 80% of 5 critics' reviews are positive.

== Accolades ==
Screenwriter Harold Medford was nominated for the 1949 Writers Guild of America Award for the Screen, Best Written American Drama.
