= Robert Wolders =

Dutch actor (1936–2018)

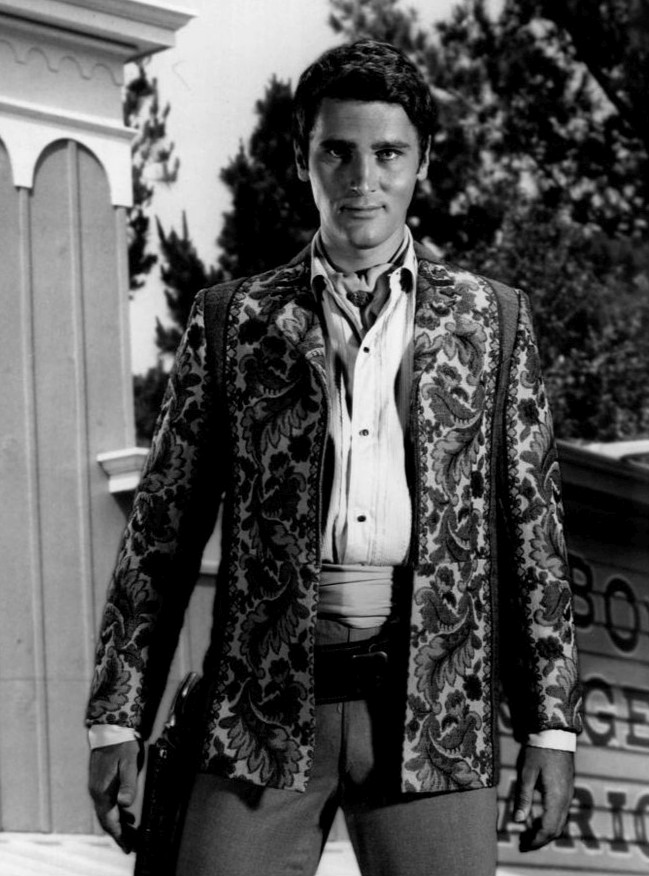
- Wolders in Laredo, October 1966
- Born: 28 September 1936; Rotterdam, Netherlands
- Died: 12 July 2018 (aged 81); Malibu, California, US
- Years active: 1965–1975
- Spouse: Merle Oberon (m. 1975; died 1979)
- Partner(s): Audrey Hepburn (1980–1993; her death); Shirlee Fonda (1995–2018)

Robert Wolders (28 September 1936 – 12 July 2018) was a Dutch television actor known for his role in the US television series Laredo and appearing in series such as The Man from U.N.C.L.E., Bewitched and The Mary Tyler Moore Show. He was married to Merle Oberon, and was the longtime partner of Audrey Hepburn.

== Career ==
Wolders came to the US in the early 60s to study psychotherapy at the University of Rochester. At the advice of one of his professors he took up acting. After finishing university, he enrolled in the American Academy of Dramatic Arts in New York City, expecting to return to the University of Rochester afterward. Instead, he was offered an acting job by Universal.

Typecast as a "Latin Lover" because of his good looks and exotic accent, Wolders started out appearing in TV series like Flipper and The John Forsythe Show. He signed a contract with Universal Pictures that led to several film roles as well as landing the role of Erik Hunter in the second season of the TV series Laredo. He also had guest roles in other shows, including Daniel Boone, The Man from U.N.C.L.E., The Name of the Game, The F.B.I., Bewitched, and The Mary Tyler Moore Show. Wolders stopped acting shortly after marrying Merle Oberon in 1975.

== Personal life ==
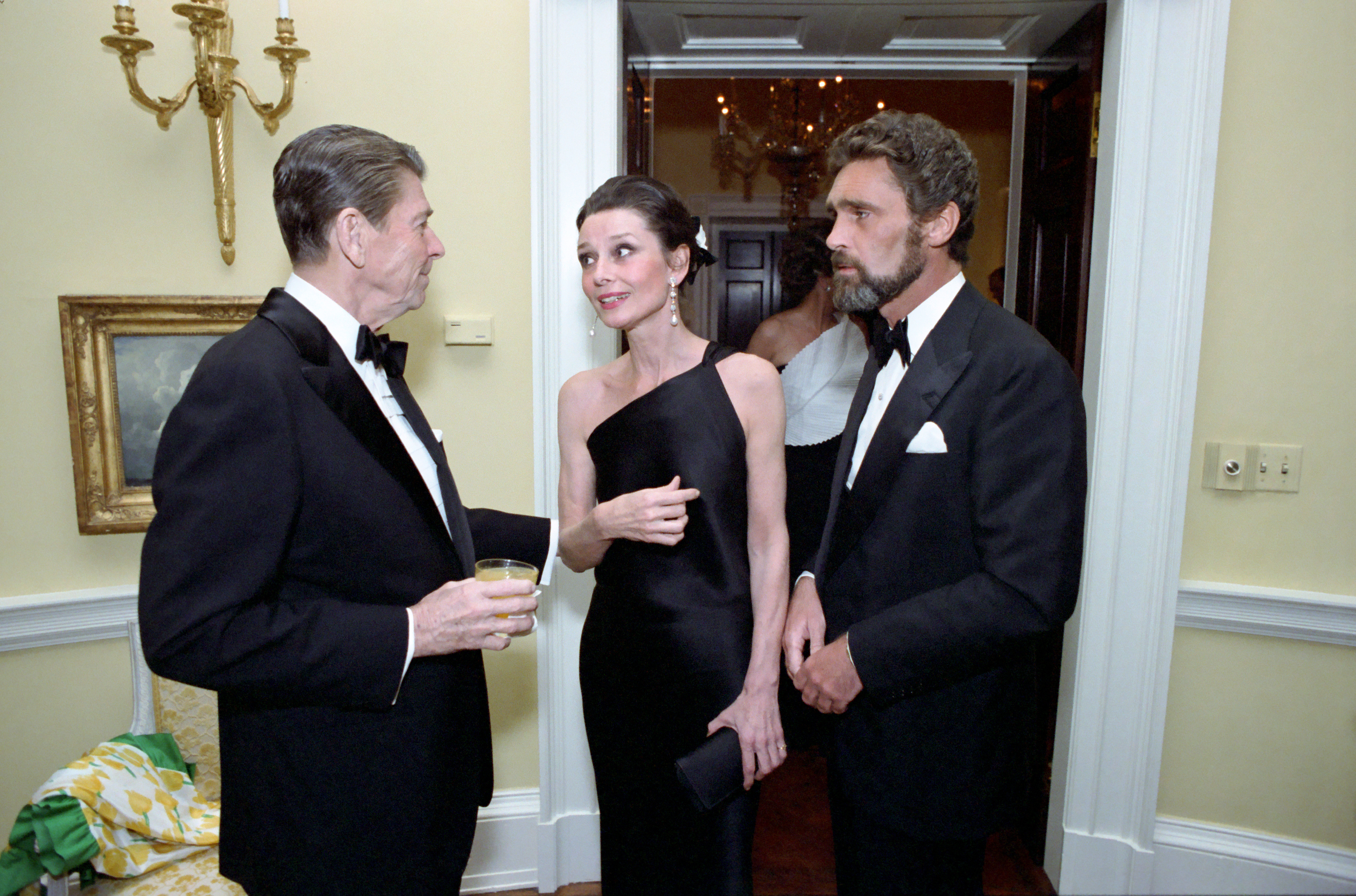
Wolders and partner Audrey Hepburn talking with President Ronald Reagan in May 1981

Wolders met actress Merle Oberon while filming Interval in 1973. Oberon was married at the time, but after filming with Wolders she divorced her husband of 16 years, Bruno Pagliai, and married Wolders in 1975. Wolders was 25 years younger than Oberon. They remained married until her death in 1979.

In 1980, Wolders became the companion of Audrey Hepburn until her death in 1993. From 1994 to 1995, he and actress-dancer Leslie Caron were a couple.

In 1995, Wolders began a relationship with Henry Fonda's widow, Shirlee Fonda.

Wolders died on 12 July 2018, at the age of 81.

== Filmography ==
Year	Title	Role	Notes
1965	Juliet of the Spirits	Corpse at Susy's party	Uncredited
1965	Flipper	Captain Johnson	Episode: "Flipper and the Spy"
1966	Run for Your Life	Marcel Lambert	Episode: "In Search of April"
1966	The John Forsythe Show	Mishka	Episode: "If I Were a Prince"
1966	Beau Geste	Fouchet	
1966–1967	Laredo	Erik Hunter	26 episodes
1967	Tobruk	Corporal Bruckner	
1967	Daniel Boone	Almaviva	Episode: "The Beaumarchais"
1967	The Man from U.N.C.L.E.	Andreas Petros	Episode: "The Man from THRUSH Affair"
1968	The Name of the Game	Dubrek	Episode: "The White Birch"
1969	The F.B.I.	Eric Linler	Episode: "The Doll Courier"
1970	Dan August	Gabe Redfern	Episode: "Murder by Proxy"
1970	Kemek	Sebastian	
1970	Bewitched	Clark	Episode: "The Corsican Cousins"
1971	Raid on Rommel	German Pilot	Uncredited
1973	Interval	Chris	
1974	Banacek	Tommy Forrest	Episode: "The Vanishing Chalice"
1974	The Mary Tyler Moore Show	Paul Van Dillen	Episode: "Not Just Another Pretty Face"
1974	McMillan & Wife	Ilia Astrov	Episode: "The Game of Survival"
1975	The Legendary Curse of the Hope Diamond	Hendrik	TV movie, (final film role)
