= Overland Trail (TV series) =

American TV series

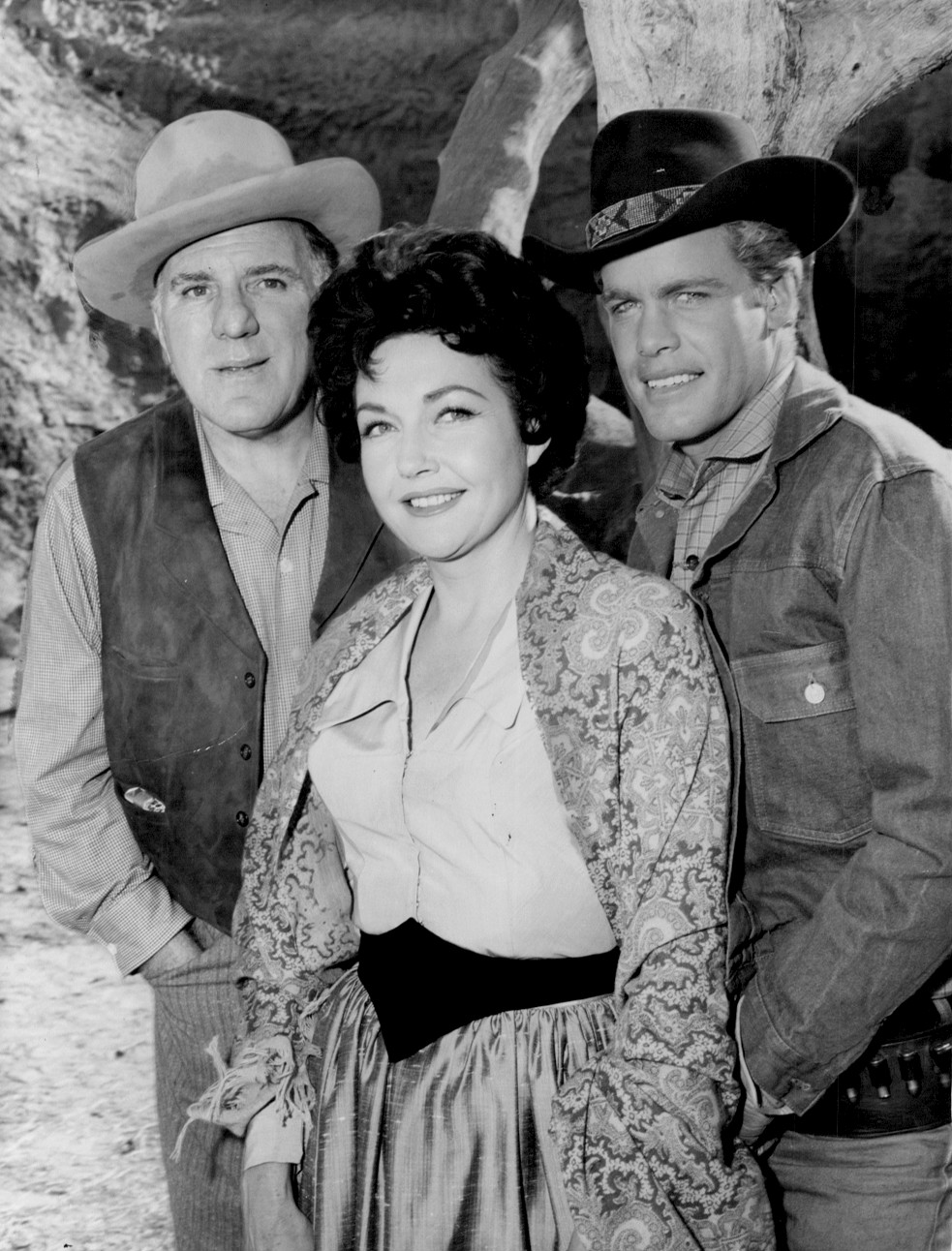
- William Bendix, guest star Lynn Bari, and Doug McClure, 1960
- Also known as: Overland Stage
- Genre: Western
- Written by: Martin Berkeley; Borden Chase; Fred Freiberger; B.L. James; Samuel A. Peeples
- Directed by: Tay Garnett; Sidney Salkow; Lesley Selander; Virgil Vogel; William Witney
- Starring: William Bendix; Doug McClure
- Theme music composer: Jeff Alexander; Dave Kahn; Stanley Wilson
- Country of origin: United States
- Original language: English
- No. of seasons: 1
- No. of episodes: 17

Production
- Executive producer: Nat Holt
- Producer: Samuel A. Peeples
- Camera setup: Single-camera
- Running time: 60 mins.
- Production companies: Overland Stage-Bilben Productions; Stagecoach Productions; Revue Studios

Original release
- Network: NBC
- Release: February 7 – July 2, 1960

Overland Trail is an American Western television series starring William Bendix and Doug McClure, which aired on NBC from February 7 to June 6, 1960.

== Synopsis ==
Bendix portrayed Frederick Thomas "Fred" Kelly, fictitious superintendent of the Overland Stage Company. McClure appeared as Frank "Flip" Flippen, Bendix's young associate.

Overland Trail aired opposite Lassie and Dennis the Menace on CBS and Walt Disney Presents and Maverick on ABC. Overland Trail left the air on September 11, 1960, after summer rebroadcasts. It was replaced by the last season of NBC's Shirley Temple's Storybook.

== Notable guest stars ==
Notable guest stars included:

- Mario Alcalde
- John Anderson
- Robert Anderson
- Claude Akins
- Lynn Bari
- Rayford Barnes
- Whitney Blake
- Russ Bender
- James Best
- Chet Brandenburg
- Robert Bray
- John Carradine
- James Chandler
- Steve Conte
- Walter Coy
- Frank Dekova
- Alan Dexter
- Don Dubbins
- Frank Ferguson
- Harper Flaherty
- Dianne Foster
- Kelton Garwood
- Robert Griffin
- Ron Hayes
- Michael Hinn
- Rex Holman
- Rodolfo Hoyos Jr.
- Lang Jeffries
- Ray Kellogg
- Werner Klemperer
- Robert Loggia
- BarBara Luna
- Barton MacLane
- Ted Mapes
- John Marley
- Lucy Marlow
- Ken Mayer
- Mercedes McCambridge
- Sean McClory
- John McIntire
- Denny Scott Miller
- Gerald Mohr
- Mary Tyler Moore
- Read Morgan
- Jimmy Noel
- Gregg Palmer
- Slim Pickens
- Andrew Prine
- Judson Pratt
- Denver Pyle
- Gilman Rankin
- Jack Reitzen
- Karen Sharpe
- Quentin Sondergaard
- Boyd Stockman
- Robert Tetrick
- Kelly Thordsen
- Eddy Waller
- Adam West
- Peter Whitney
- Robert J. Wilke
- Tony Young

== Episodes ==
No. in season	Title	Directed by	Written by	Original release date
1	"Perilous Passage"	Virgil W. Vogel	Samuel A. Peeples	February 7, 1960
2	"The O'Mara Ladies"	Jerry Hopper	Borden Chase	February 14, 1960
3	"West of Boston"	David Butler	Fred Freiberger	February 21, 1960
4	"The High Bridge"	Harold Schuster	Story by : Samuel A. Peeples; Teleplay by : Martin Berkeley	February 28, 1960
5	"Westbound Stage"	Sidney Salkow	Samuel A. Peeples	March 6, 1960
6	"All The O'Mara Horses"	Sidney Salkow	Borden Chase	March 13, 1960
7	"Daughter of the Sioux"	D. Ross Lederman	Story by : Samuel A. Peeples; Teleplay by : Dwight Newton	March 20, 1960
8	"Lawyer In Petticoats"	Tay Garnett	Fred Freiberger	March 27, 1960
9	"The Vigilantes of Montana"	Sidney Salkow	Story by : Samuel A. Peeples; Teleplay by : Martin Berkeley	April 3, 1960
10	"Fire In the Hole"	Tay Garnett	Borden Chase	April 17, 1960
11	"Mission Into Mexico"	Tay Garnett	N.B. Stone, Jr.	April 24, 1960
12	"First Stage to Denver"	Christian Nyby	Story by : Samuel A. Peeples; Teleplay by : Barry Shipman	May 1, 1960
13	"Sour Annie"	William Witney	B.L. James	May 8, 1960
14	"The Baron Comes Back"	Tay Garnett	B.L. James	May 15, 1960
15	"Escort Detail"	Lesley Selander	B.L. James	May 22, 1960
16	"The Reckoning"	William Witney	B.L. James	May 29, 1960
17	"Most Dangerous Gentleman"	William Witney	Samuel A. Peeples	June 5, 1960

== Home media ==
On February 14, 2012, Timeless Media Group released Overland Trail- The Complete Series on DVD in Region 1.
