= Harper Flaherty =

American actor and stuntman

- Born: Harper Anthony Flaherty; April 10, 1920; Ohio, U.S.
- Died: August 4, 1993 (aged 73)
- Occupations: Actor, stuntman

Harper Anthony Flaherty (April 10, 1920 – August 4, 1993) was an American actor and stuntman. He was best known for playing Harper, a ranch hand in the American western television series The Virginian.

== Life and career ==
Flaherty was born in Ohio, and was raised in California. He served in the United States Navy during World War II. After his discharge, he performed as an ice skater with the Hollywood Ice Revue at Madison Square Garden. He began his screen career in 1959, appearing in the syndicated detective television series Mickey Spillane's Mike Hammer. In the same year, he appeared in the NBC western television series Wagon Train.

Later in his career, Flaherty starred as Harper, a ranch hand in the NBC western television series The Virginian. Aside from his role, he served as a stunt double for Doug McClure in the television series. He also performed stunts for McClure in Overland Trail and Search. He guest-starred in television programs including The Deputy and Laredo, and appeared in the 1960 film Psycho.

== Death ==
Flaherty died on August 4, 1993, at the age of 73.
