= Diane Roter =

American actress

- Roter in The Virginian, 1966
- Born: 1947 or 1948 (age 78–79); Brussels, Belgium
- Occupations: Actress, teacher, journalist
- Years active: 1959–present

Diane Roter (born 1947 or 1948) is an American actress best known for her appearances in the long-running TV Western The Virginian in its fourth season, which ran from 1965 to 1966. She then appeared in an episode of Laredo, which was a spin-off from The Virginian series in 1966 and later appeared in an episode of the TV show Family Affair in 1969. She is also known as Danielle Roter and made appearances in television and film from 1959 until 1970. She currently is a professional writer, actor, director, critic, and arts journalist. She is a certified teaching artist. She has also worked as an editor, computer tutor, algebra teacher, writing and performance coach, and political organizer. She is as also known as Dani Roter.

== Early life ==
Roter was born in Brussels, Belgium, the daughter of Mr. and Mrs. Ted Roter. Her father was an actor and executive producer for the Santa Monica Playhouse. Her parents moved to the United States in 1952 and became citizens in 1957. She attended a Brussels school in 1961-1962 and later attended Venice High School in Los Angeles. She gained early acting experience at the Playhouse. When she was 10 years old she appeared with Charles Laughton in the television drama "The Last Lesson".

== Career ==
After a talent scout for Universal Studios saw Roter starring in Gigi at the Playhouse, a screen test led to her obtaining the role in The Virginian. She played Jennifer Sommers, Judge Henry Garth's (Lee J. Cobb) niece. She joined the show taking the place of Betsy Garth (Roberta Shore), who left the show in the previous season. Her time in the TV series was cut short when Lee J. Cobb left the series before his contract was completed in the middle of the fourth season. Jennifer Sommers' character was independent, confident, and sharing, and she helped others in her day-to-day activities. She was left "home alone" many times as Judge Garth made business trips preparing to become the new Wyoming Territory governor. Other cast members of The Virginian with whom she appeared were James Drury, Doug McClure, Clu Gulager, and Randy Boone.

=== Awards ===
She won the Bronze Wrangler award from the National Cowboy & Western Heritage Museum in 1966 for her acting in the episode titled "The Horse Fighter".

=== Television filmography ===
On The Virginian these fourth-season episodes were the ones in which she had a significant role:

Diane Roter as "Jennifer Sommers" in The Virginian TV Series
Date	Season	Episode	Episode name
November 3, 1965	4	7	"Jennifer"
November 10, 1965	4	8	"Nobility of Kings"
December 1, 1965	4	11	"The Dream of Stavros Karas"
December 15, 1965	4	13	"The Horse Fighter"
December 22, 1965	4	14	"Letter of the Law"
January 5, 1966	4	16	"Nobody Said Hello"
January 26, 1966	4	19	"Chaff in the Wind"
February 2, 1966	4	20	"The Inchworms Got No Wings at All"
February 9, 1966	4	21	"Morgan Starr"
March 30, 1966	4	27	"That Saunders Woman"
April 20, 1966	4	30	"Mark of a Man"

Television filmography
Show	Date	Season	Episode	Episode name
Laredo	September 23, 1966	2	2	"The Dance of the Laughing Death"
Family Affair	April 7, 1969	3	27	"Flower Power"
General Electric Theater	February 8, 1959	7	19	"The Last Lesson"
Dick Powell Show	October 30, 1962	2	6	"The Great Anatole"
Hondo	October 13, 1967	1	6	"Hondo and the Apache Kid"
The Rat Patrol	February 19, 1968	2	22	"The Double Jeopardy Raid"

- In 1969, Danielle Roter appeared in Justine a 116-minute drama film directed by George Cukor. In 1970, she appeared in the 87-minute drama film titled Triangle. She was in the company of Dana Wynter in this last film just as she was in her early filmed appearance on the Dick Powell Show in 1962.

== After television ==
After her appearances in television, she trained with Marcel Marceau in Paris and performed as a mime at the Mark Taper Forum. She has taught mime and movement, as well as acting and writing, in private classes and in schools. She taught algebra to adults at Los Angeles Valley College and earned a bachelor of arts in biopsychology from UCLA, and was honored with a research training award. She has been published in journalism and art criticism in the Los Angeles Times, San Jose Mercury News, The Daily News, LA Weekly, and The Advocate.

She joined her fellow cast members from The Virginian for their 50th-anniversary celebration at the Memphis Film Festival on May 31, 2012. The event was held south of Memphis in Olive Branch, MS. She appeared with James Drury, Gary Clarke, L.Q. Jones, Roberta Shore, Randy Boone, Sara Lane, and Don Quine.

She joined her fellow cast members at a second 50th-anniversary celebration in Kanab, Utah, at the Western Legends Roundup on August 16, 2012. She appeared with Drury, Clarke, Sara Lane, and Quine.

She attended a third 50th-anniversary celebration with Drury, Clarke, Jones, Roberta Shore, Boone, Clu Gulager, Sara Lane, and Quine in Los Angeles, at the Autry National Center and Museum on September 22, 2012. On this same date, The Virginian began a three-year agreement to run on the Inspiration Network cable channel.

Cozi TV, the NBCUniversal classic-television digital-specialty network, began airing episodes in 2013. MeTV airs episodes in selected viewing areas. She appeared as a guest star at the Roy Rogers Festival in Portsmouth, Ohio, on July 31, 2013, with fellow Virginian cast member Don Quine and actress and singer Lainie Kazan.

She attended as a guest star, the Cowboy Up for Vets Horse Show with fellow Virginian cast members Drury, Shore, Clarke, Boone, Gulager, Lane, and Quine. The show was held on March 28, 2014, in Swanton, Ohio. She took part in a special celebration of James Drury's 80th birthday at the show.

She attended as guest star, the largest cast reunion of The Virginian assembled at the Cowboy Up for Vets Horse Show held on April 22–24, 2016, in Swanton. Other cast members who attended were Drury, Shore, Clarke, Jones, Boone, Gulager, Lane, Quine, and Joe Cannon.
