= Merle Oberon =

American-British actress (1911–1979)

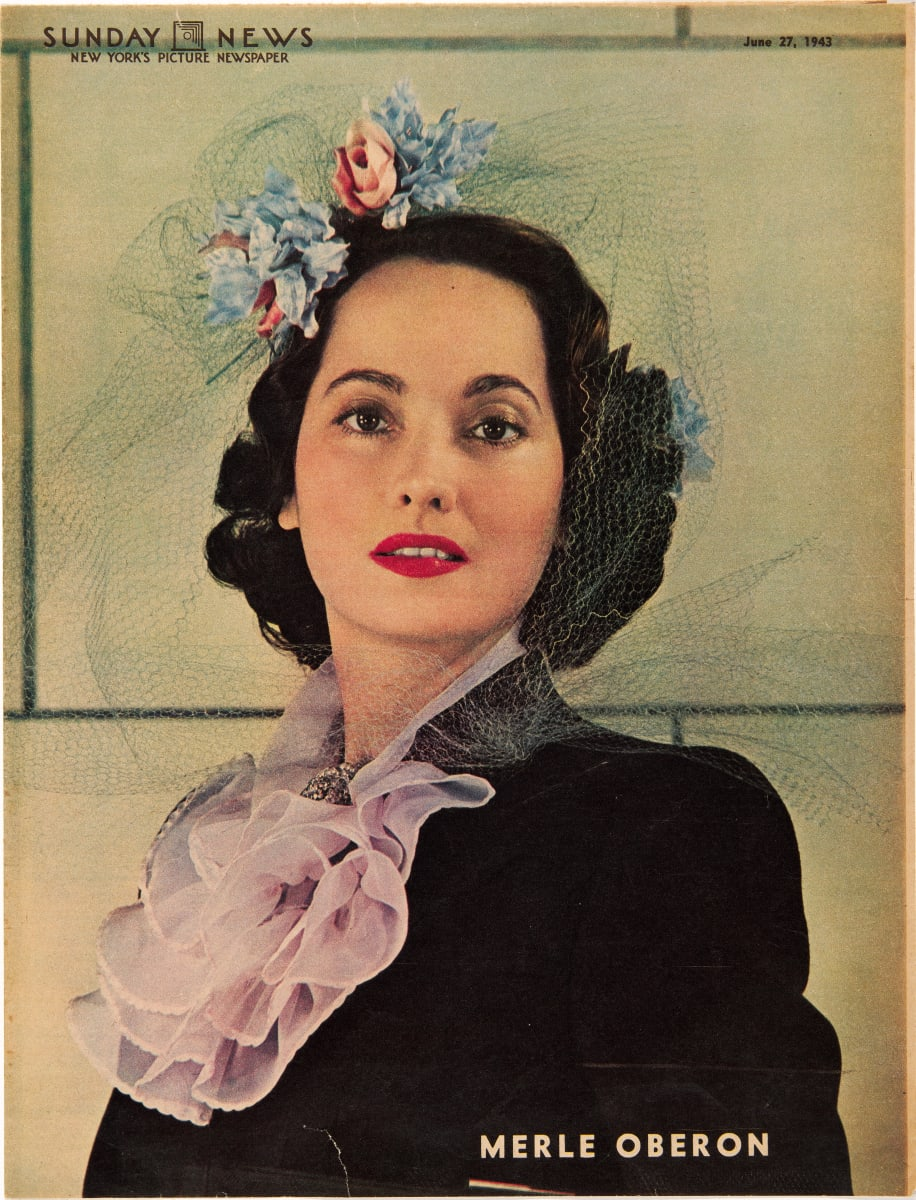
- Oberon in 1943
- Born: Estelle Merle O'Brien Thompson; 19 February 1911; Bombay, British India
- Died: 23 November 1979 (aged 68); Malibu, California, U.S.
- Occupation: Actress
- Years active: 1928–1973
- Spouses: Sir Alexander Korda (m. 1939; div. 1945) Lucien Ballard (m. 1945; div. 1949) Bruno Pagliai (m. 1957; div. 1973) Robert Wolders (m. 1975)
- Children: 2

Merle Oberon (born Estelle Merle O'Brien Thompson; 19 February 1911 – 23 November 1979) was a British actress. Her career spanned the 1920s to the 1970s, and she was a major leading lady during the Golden Age of Hollywood.

Born and raised in British India, she began her acting career in British cinema in the early 1930s, with a breakout role in The Private Life of Henry VIII (1933). She later moved to Hollywood, where she became an international star, earning acclaim for films such as The Dark Angel (1935), Wuthering Heights (1939), and That Uncertain Feeling (1941). Her performance as Kitty Vane in The Dark Angel earned her a nomination for the Academy Award for Best Actress.

Oberon's other notable roles included A Song to Remember (1945), Berlin Express (1948), and Désirée (1954). A traffic collision in 1937 caused facial injuries that nearly ended her career, but she recovered and remained active in film and television until 1973.

Throughout her adult life, Oberon concealed her parentage and ethnic background, claiming to have been born in Australia to white British parents. Despite hiding her Asian heritage throughout her career, Oberon is regarded as the first Asian nominee in the Best Actress category and the first Asian individual overall to receive an Oscar nomination.

== Early life ==
Estelle Merle O'Brien Thompson was born in Bombay, British India, on 19 February 1911, to a white father and a Burgher mother. She was given the nickname "Queenie" in honour of Queen Mary, who visited India along with King George V in 1911.

=== Parentage ===
For most of her life, Oberon concealed the truth about her parentage by claiming that she had been born in Tasmania, Australia, to white parents, and that her birth records had been destroyed in a fire. She identified as British.

She was raised as the daughter of Arthur Terrence O'Brien Thompson, a Welsh mechanical engineer from Darlington who worked in Indian Railways, and his wife, Charlotte Selby, whose full married name, according to her 1937 obituary, was Constance Charlotte Thompson. Selby was born in Sri Lanka (then Ceylon) and was a Burgher (a small Eurasian ethnic group in Sri Lanka).

Oberon's birth certificate lists her biological mother as "Constance Thompson", which could have referred to either Constance Charlotte Selby or her then-14-year-old daughter, Constance Joyce Selby. It is theorized that Thompson impregnated his stepdaughter Constance Joyce by rape, with Oberon being raised as Constance Joyce's half-sister to avoid scandal. Neither Constance Charlotte nor Constance Joyce acknowledged this theory during their lifetimes, and DNA testing did not exist then to determine maternity.

Constance Charlotte herself had given birth to Constance Joyce at the age of 14, after being raped by Henry Alfred Selby, the Anglo-Irish foreman of a tea plantation. In their 1983 biography of Oberon, Charles Higham and Roy Moseley (known to write highly fictionalised accounts of celebrities) also averred, dubiously, that Constance Charlotte had Māori ancestry, though which Iwi (Maori tribe) was not specified.

Constance Joyce married Alexander Soares, with whom she had four children: Edna, Douglas, Harry, and Stanislaus. Edna and Douglas moved to the UK at an early age. Stanislaus, who lived in Surrey, Canada, was the only child to retain his father's surname of Soares. Harry eventually moved to Toronto, Canada, retaining grandmother Charlotte's maiden name, Selby.

After locating Oberon's birth certificate in Indian government records in Bombay, Harry tried to visit her in Los Angeles, only for Oberon to refuse any meeting. When Higham and Moseley were working on their biography of Oberon, Harry withheld that he might have been Oberon's half-brother instead of her nephew; he later disclosed the information to Maree Delofski, producer of the 2002 ABC documentary The Trouble with Merle, which investigated the conflicting versions of Oberon's origin, and repeated it to biographer Mayukh Sen, who included it in the book Love, Queenie: Merle Oberon, Hollywood's First South Asian Star (2025).

=== Youth ===
In 1914, when Merle was three, her father, Arthur Thompson, joined the British Army and later died of pneumonia on the Western Front during the Battle of the Somme. Merle and Charlotte led an impoverished existence in shabby flats in Bombay for a few years before moving in 1917 to Calcutta. Oberon attended La Martinière Calcutta for Girls, one of the best private schools in Calcutta, as a charity student. There, she was constantly teased by the majority European students for her mixed ethnicity, which led her to quit school and receive lessons at home.

Oberon performed with the Calcutta Amateur Dramatic Society. She loved films; she liked going to nightclubs. Indian journalist Sunanda K. Datta-Ray said that Merle worked as a telephone operator in Calcutta under the name Queenie Thomson, and won a contest at Firpo's Restaurant there, before the outset of her film career.

At Firpo's in 1929, aged 18, Oberon met a former actor, Colonel Ben Finney, and dated him; however, when he saw Charlotte one night at her flat, he realized Oberon was of mixed ancestry and ended the relationship. However, Finney promised to introduce her to Rex Ingram of Victorine Studios (whom he had known through his relationship with the late Barbara La Marr), if she were prepared to travel to France, which she readily did. After packing all their belongings and moving to France, Oberon and her mother found that their supposed benefactor avoided them, although he had left a good word for Oberon with Ingram at the studios in Nice. Ingram appreciated Oberon's exotic appearance and quickly hired her to be an extra in a party scene in a film named The Three Passions.

== Acting career ==
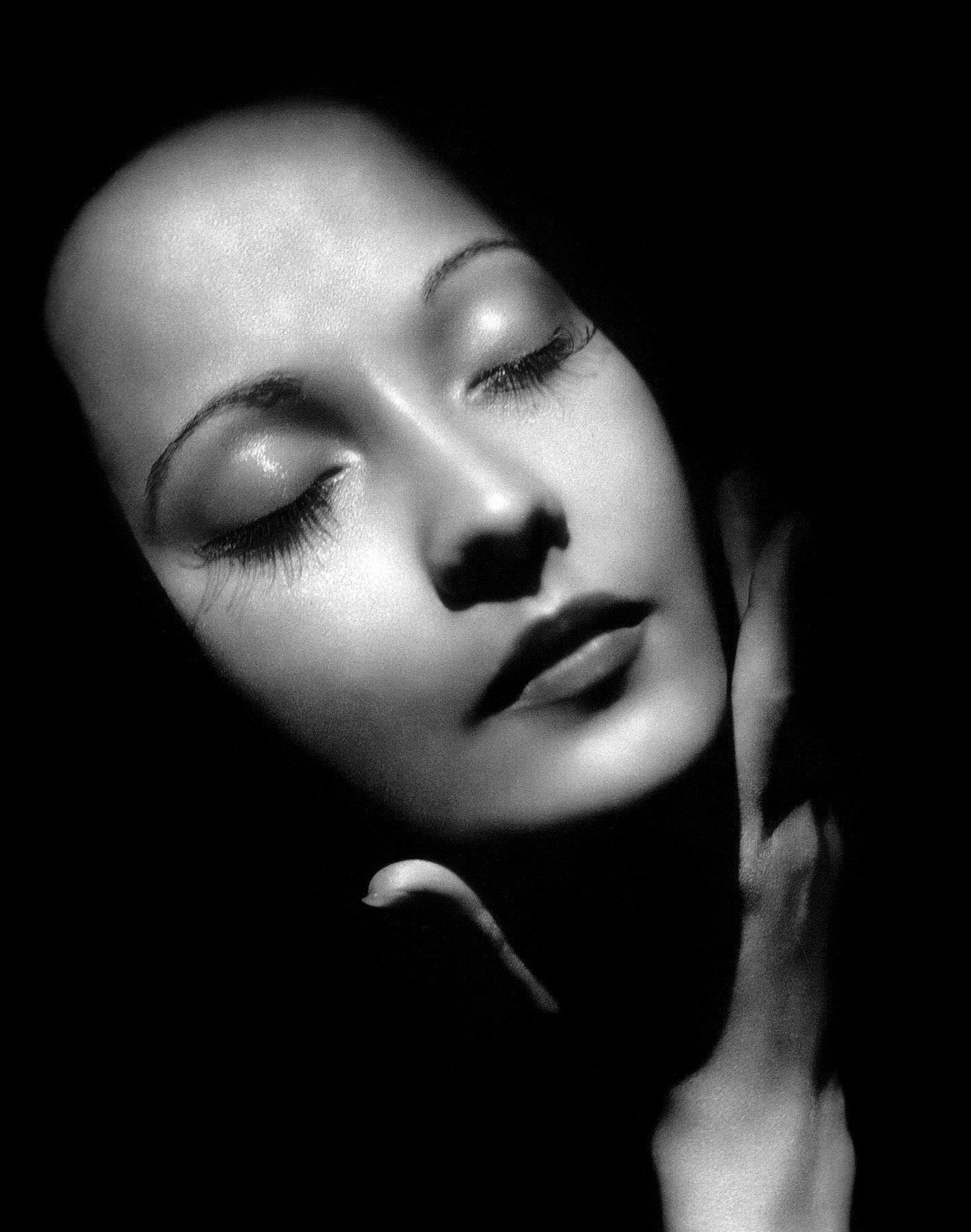
Merle Oberon in 1936

=== Early roles ===
Oberon arrived in England for the first time in 1928, aged 17. She worked as a club hostess under the name Queenie O'Brien and played in minor and unbilled roles in various films. "I couldn't dance or sing or write or paint. The only possible opening seemed to be in some line in which I could use my face. This was, in fact, no better than a hundred other faces, but it did possess a fortunately photogenic quality," she told a journalist at Film Weekly in 1939.

=== Alexander Korda and British stardom ===
Her film career received a major boost when director Alexander Korda took an interest and gave her a small but prominent role, under the name Merle Oberon, as Anne Boleyn in The Private Life of Henry VIII (1933) opposite Charles Laughton. The film became a major success and she was then given leading roles in other productions, starting with The Battle (1934) opposite Charles Boyer, and The Broken Melody (1934).

Oberon then made two more films for Korda: The Private Life of Don Juan (1934) with Douglas Fairbanks was a disappointment but The Scarlet Pimpernel (1934) with Leslie Howard, who became her lover for a while, was a huge hit.

=== Hollywood and Sam Goldwyn ===
Oberon's career benefited from her relationship with, and later marriage to, Korda. He sold "shares" of her contract to producer Samuel Goldwyn and she moved to Hollywood. Her "mother" stayed behind in England. Oberon's career there began with Folies Bergère de Paris (1935) starring Maurice Chevalier.

Goldwyn put her in The Dark Angel (1935), which earned her a sole Academy Award for Best Actress nomination, then These Three (1936) for William Wyler and Beloved Enemy (1936). The latter co-starred David Niven, with whom Oberon had a serious romance. According to one biographer, she even wanted to marry him, but he was not faithful to her.

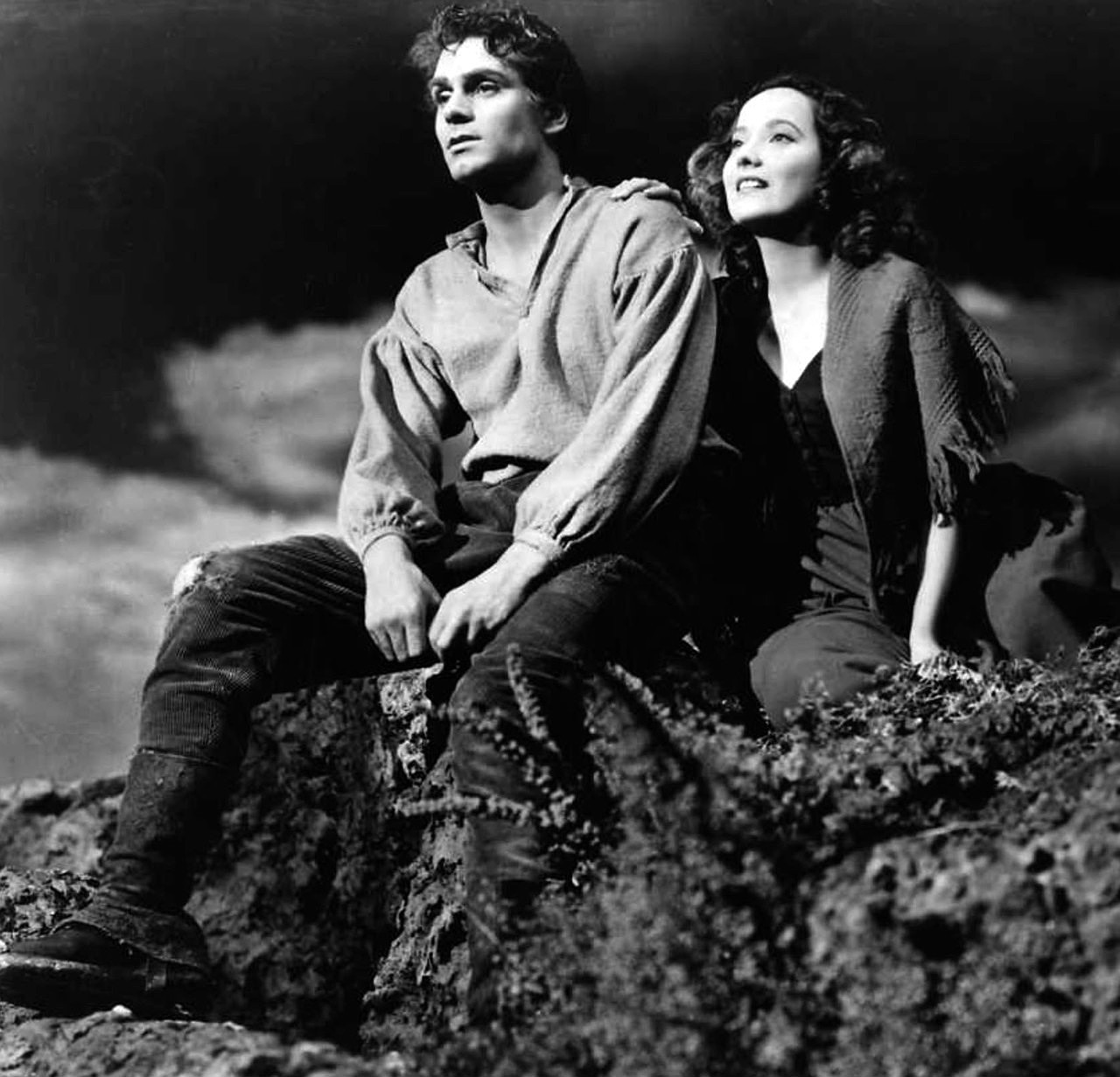
Laurence Olivier and Merle Oberon in Wuthering Heights (1939)

She was selected to star in Korda's 1937 film, I, Claudius, as Messalina, but her injuries in a car crash resulted in the film being abandoned. (Note: In July 1937, United Press correspondent Dan Rogers noted: "Beautiful Merle Oberon has two scars from her recent automobile accident, but movie fans will never see them. She is completely recovered, is entertaining again at her home... and will start a new picture here this month.... One [injury] was a slight cut on the left eyelid; it left no mark at all. The most serious hurt was to the back of her head; it left a scar but of course it is hidden by her thick hair. Just in front of her left ear is a fine perpendicular white line a half-inch long. So skilfully did surgeons do their job that this scar is invisible except at a range of a yard or less, in strong light.") Around this time she sat for the Portrait of Merle Oberon by Gerald Brockhurst. While in England she co-starred with Laurence Olivier in the Korda comedy The Divorce of Lady X (1938).

Back in Hollywood, Oberon appeared opposite Gary Cooper in The Cowboy and the Lady (1938) and then played Cathy in the highly acclaimed film Wuthering Heights (1939) opposite Laurence Olivier. In England, Oberon made Over the Moon (1939) and The Lion Has Wings (1939) for Korda.

Oberon had darker skin, due to her Sri Lankan background. This was not too much a problem in black-and-white film, but she did not "test well" during colour film tests. According to Princess Merle, the biography written by Charles Higham with Roy Moseley, Oberon suffered damage to her complexion in 1940 from a combination of cosmetic poisoning and an allergic reaction to sulfa drugs in an attempt to lighten her skin. Alexander Korda sent her to a skin specialist in New York City, where she underwent several dermabrasion procedures. The results were only partially successful; her face had become noticeably pitted and indented unless concealed by makeup.

Oberon starred in Til We Meet Again (1940) and Affectionately Yours (1941) for Warner Bros, then That Uncertain Feeling (1941) for Ernst Lubitsch. Korda financed Lydia (1941). None of these films were particularly successful at the box office. Oberon was one of many stars to make cameos in Forever and a Day (1943) and Stage Door Canteen (1943). She made First Comes Courage (1943) at Columbia and played the female lead in The Lodger (1944), a popular noir. Also admired was Dark Waters (1944).

Oberon had a big hit with A Song to Remember (1945), in which she played the French writer George Sand. However, this was followed by a series of unsuccessful films at Universal: This Love of Ours (1946), Night in Paradise (1946), and Temptation (1946). She made some films for RKO, Night Song (1948), and Berlin Express (1948).

=== Later career ===
In France, Oberon appeared in Pardon My French (1951), then 24 Hours of a Woman's Life (1952) in England and All Is Possible in Granada (1954). Back in Hollywood she played the Empress Joséphine in Désirée (1954) and had a cameo role in Deep in My Heart (1954). She had the lead in a noir, The Price of Fear (1956). Oberon came out of retirement sporadically to appear in films such as Of Love and Desire (1963) and Hotel (1967). Her last movie was Interval (1973).

== Personal life and death ==
Charlotte Selby, Oberon’s possible birth grandmother, raised Oberon as her daughter until her death in 1937. In 1949, Oberon commissioned paintings of Charlotte based on an old photograph (but depicting Charlotte with lighter skin), which hung in all her homes until Oberon's own death in 1979.

=== Relationships and marriages ===
Oberon married director Alexander Korda in 1939. While married, she had a brief affair in 1941 with Richard Hillary, an RAF fighter pilot who had been badly burned in the Battle of Britain. They met while he was on a goodwill tour of the United States. He later wrote the best-selling autobiography The Last Enemy.

Oberon became Lady Korda when her husband was knighted in 1942 by King George VI for his contribution to the war effort. At the time, the couple was based at Hills House in Denham, England. She divorced him in 1945 to marry the American cinematographer Lucien Ballard. Ballard devised a special camera light for her, to obscure on film her facial scars suffered in the 1937 accident. The light became known as the "Obie" (now commonly-called a "catch light") and has become ubiquitous in photography and videography. She and Ballard divorced in 1949.

Oberon married Italian-born industrialist Bruno Pagliai in 1957, adopted two children with him and lived in Cuernavaca, Morelos, Mexico. While married to Pagliai, she had an affair with model Mike Edwards, who was 33 years her junior. While filming Interval in 1973, Oberon met Dutch actor Robert Wolders who was 25 years her junior. Oberon divorced Pagliai and married the 36-year-old Wolders in 1975.

=== Disputed birthplace ===
Merle Oberon was of partial Sri Lankan Burgher origin.

To avoid prejudice over her mixed background, Oberon dissembled that she was born and raised in Tasmania, Australia, and that her birth records were destroyed in a fire. The story eventually unravelled after her death. Oberon is known to have been to Australia only twice. Her first visit there was in 1965, on a film promotion. Another visit, to Hobart, Tasmania, was scheduled, but after journalists in Sydney pressed her for details of her early life, she became ill and shortly afterwards left for Mexico.

In 1978, the year before her death, she agreed to visit Hobart for a Lord mayoral reception. The Lord Mayor of Hobart became aware shortly before the reception that there was no proof she had been born in Tasmania, but he went ahead with the celebration to avoid embarrassment. Shortly after arriving at the reception, Oberon, to the disappointment of many, denied she had been born in Tasmania. She then excused herself, claiming illness, and was unavailable to answer questions about her background. On the way to the reception, she had told her driver that as a child she was on a ship with her father, who became ill when it was passing Hobart. They were taken ashore so he could be treated, thereby spending some time in her early years on the island. During her Hobart stay, she remained in her hotel, gave no other interviews, and did not visit the theatre named in her honour.

=== Death ===
Oberon retired after Interval and moved with Wolders to Malibu, California, where she died in 1979, aged 68, after suffering a stroke. Her body was interred at Forest Lawn Memorial Park Cemetery in Glendale, California.

== Reputation and legacy ==
Despite hiding her Asian heritage throughout her career, Oberon is regarded as the first Asian nominee in the Best Actress category and the first Asian individual overall to receive an Oscar nomination. In 2023, discussion around Oberon's Academy Awards status resurfaced after Malaysian Michelle Yeoh won Best Actress for Everything Everywhere All at Once. News outlets such as The Hollywood Reporter opted to describe Yeoh as "the first self-identified Asian actress", while making note of Oberon hiding her identity.

For her contributions to film, Oberon received a star on the Hollywood Walk of Fame, located at 6274 Hollywood Boulevard, on February 8, 1960.

Michael Korda, nephew of Alexander Korda, published a roman à clef about Oberon after her death titled Queenie in 1985, which was adapted into a 1987 television miniseries starring Mia Sara, Kirk Douglas, Sarah Miles, Claire Bloom, Leigh Lawson, and Joss Ackland.

F. Scott Fitzgerald's unfinished novel The Last Tycoon was made into a television series with Jennifer Beals playing Margo Taft, a character created for the TV series and based on Oberon.

New Zealand author Witi Ihimaera used Oberon's hidden South Asian and alleged Māori heritage as the inspiration for the novel White Lies, which was turned into the 2013 movie White Lies.

British author Lindsay Ashford, publishing under the pen name Lindsay Jayne Ashford, wrote the 2017 historical fiction novel Whisper of the Moon Moth based on Oberon. The novel is a fictionalised retelling of Oberon's early life, rise to Hollywood stardom, and turbulent personal life.

In December 2025, she was recognized as Turner Classic Movies Star of the Month.

== Acting credits ==
=== Film ===
Year	Title	Role	Notes
1928	The Three Passions	Bit Part	Uncredited
1930	The W Plan	Woman at Cafe Table	Uncredited
1930	Alf's Button	Bit Part	Uncredited
1930	A Warm Corner	Bit Part	Uncredited
1931	Never Trouble Trouble	Bit Part	Uncredited
1931	Fascination	Flower Seller	Uncredited
1932	Service for Ladies	Minor Role	Uncredited
1932	Ebb Tide	Girl	Uncredited
1932	Aren't We All?	Bit Part	Uncredited
1932	Wedding Rehearsal	Miss Hutchinson	
1932	Men of Tomorrow	Ysobel d'Aunay	
1932	For the Love of Mike	Bit Part	Uncredited
1933	Strange Evidence	Bit Part	Uncredited
1933	The Private Life of Henry VIII	Anne Boleyn	
1934	The Battle	Marquise Yorisaka	
1934	The Broken Melody	Germaine Brissard	
1934	The Private Life of Don Juan	Antonita	
1934	The Scarlet Pimpernel	Lady Marguerite Blakeney	
1935	Folies Bergère de Paris	Baroness Genevieve Cassini	
1935	The Dark Angel	Kitty Vane	Nomination - Academy Award for Best Actress
1936	These Three	Karen Wright	
1936	Beloved Enemy	Lady Helen Drummond	
1937	I, Claudius	Messalina	Unfinished
1938	The Divorce of Lady X	Leslie Steele	
1938	The Cowboy and the Lady	Mary Smith	
1939	Over the Moon	Jane Benson	
1939	Wuthering Heights	Catherine Earnshaw Linton	
1939	The Lion Has Wings	Mrs. Richardson	
1940	'Til We Meet Again	Joan Ames	
1941	That Uncertain Feeling	Jill Baker	
1941	Affectionately Yours	Sue Mayberry	
1941	Lydia	Lydia MacMillan	
1943	Forever and a Day	Marjorie Ismay	
1943	Stage Door Canteen	Herself	
1943	First Comes Courage	Nicole Larsen	
1944	The Lodger	Kitty Langley	
1944	Dark Waters	Leslie Calvin	
1945	A Song to Remember	George Sand	
1945	This Love of Ours	Karin Touzac	
1946	Night in Paradise	Delarai	
1946	Temptation	Ruby	
1947	Night Song	Cathy Mallory	
1948	Berlin Express	Lucienne Mirebeau	
1951	Pardon My French	Elizabeth Rockwell	
1952	Dans la vie tout s'arrange	Elizabeth Rockwell	French version of The Lady from Boston
1952	24 Hours of a Woman's Life	Linda Venning	
1954	All Is Possible in Granada	Margaret Faulson	
1954	Désirée	Empress Joséphine de Beauharnais	
1954	Deep in My Heart	Dorothy Donnelly	
1956	The Price of Fear	Jessica Warren	
1963	Of Love and Desire	Katherine Beckmann	
1966	The Oscar	Herself	
1967	Hotel	Duchess Caroline	
1973	Interval	Serena Moore	

=== Short subjects ===
- Screen Snapshots Series 16, No. 4 (1936)
- Hollywood Goes to Town (1938)
- Assignment Foreign Legion (1956-1957 25 episodes)

=== Radio ===
Year	Program	Episode/source
1946	Screen Guild Players	This Love of Ours
1946	Screen Guild Players	Wuthering Heights

== Awards and nominations ==
Year	Organization	Category	Work	Result	Ref.
1936	Academy Awards	Best Actress	The Dark Angel	Nominated	
1960	Hollywood Walk of Fame	Star - Motion Pictures	—N/a	Honored	

== See also ==
- List of Academy Award winners and nominees from Great Britain
