= Arthur Berthelet =

American film director (1879–1949)

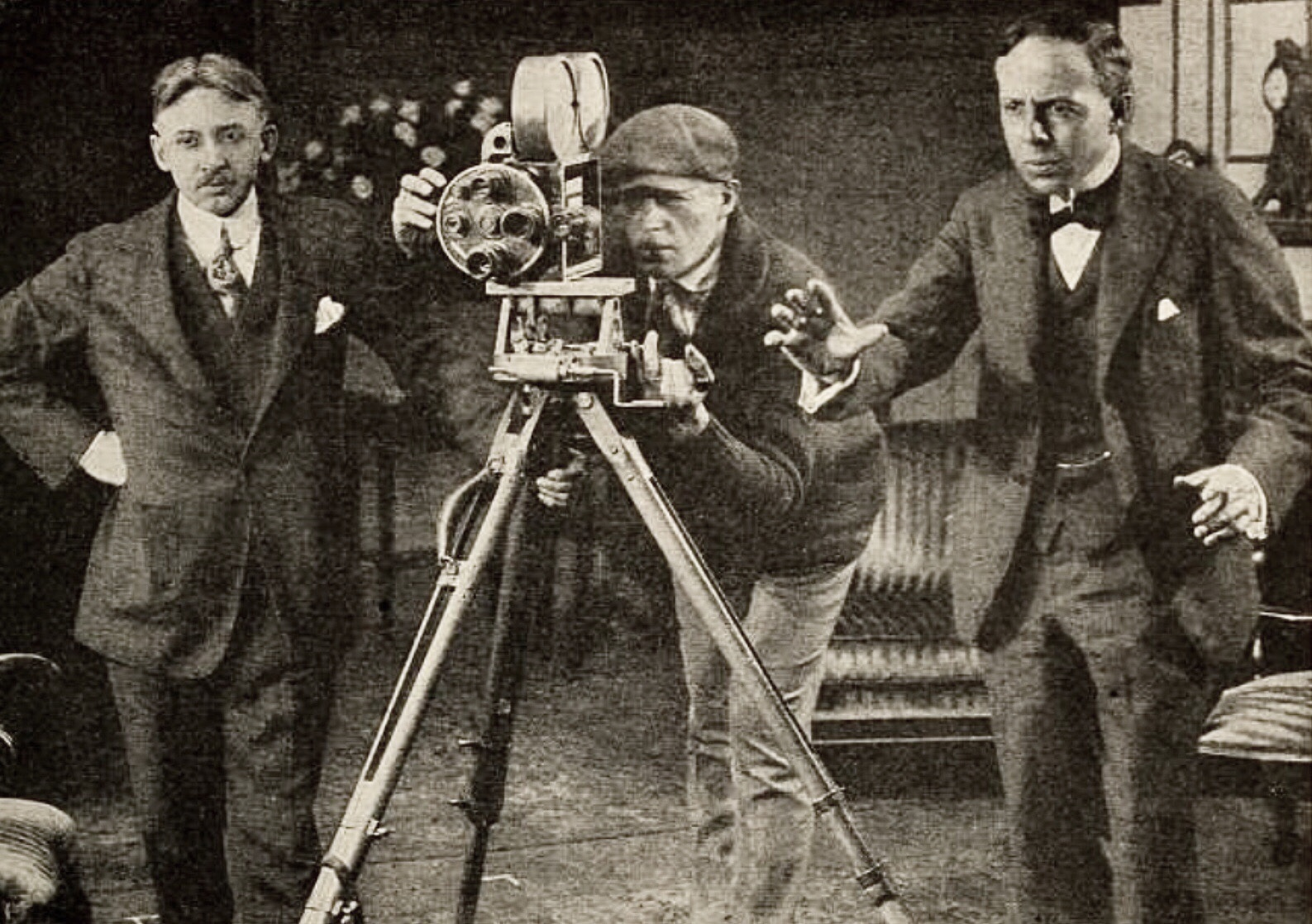
- Berthelet (right) directing at Essanay Studios in Chicago, 1917
- Born: Rolette Arthur Berthelet (Note: Berthelet's full name varies in official records. His earliest personal records, such as his birth certificate, document his name "Rolette Arthur Berthelet". Later records, however, including references to him in period trade publications, transpose his first and middle names, citing instead "Arthur Rolette Berthelet" or "Arthur R. Berthelet". It is likely that Berthelet himself chose to alter the sequence of his full name, perhaps doing so for crediting purposes or to emphasize his preferred use of "Arthur".); October 12, 1879; Milwaukee, Wisconsin; United States
- Died: September 16, 1949 (aged 69); Vista, California; United States
- Occupations: Stage and film director, scriptwriter, dialogue directory (Note: Especially during the late 1920s and early 1930s, when the silent era of films was transitioning to "talkies", dialogue directors served as speech coaches for actors unaccustomed to having their lines recorded while performing on camera. Later in the sound era, dialogue directors remained important personnel at studios for their work in training young and inexperienced screen performers in ways to improve their elocution and style of delivery on screen. Refer to "Dialogue Director" at AllMovie.)
- Years active: 1899–1940
- Spouse(s): Leona Ball (1910–1949; his death)
- Children: 2 sons

Arthur Rolette Berthelet (October 12, 1879 – September 16, 1949; credited as Rolette Bertheletto, Arthur Berthelet, and Arthur R. Berthelet) was an American actor, stage and film director, dialogue director, and scriptwriter. With regard to screen productions, he is best remembered for directing the 1916 crime drama Sherlock Holmes starring William Gillette, an actor who since 1899 had distinguished himself on the Broadway stage and at other prominent theatrical venues with his numerous, "definitive" portrayals of Sir Arthur Conan Doyle's great fictional detective. In 1918, Berthelet also directed the controversial author and feminist Mary MacLane in Men Who Have Made Love to Me, a production notable for being among the first cinematic dramas to break the "fourth wall" and among the earliest American film projects to bring together on screen a woman's work as a published author, "scenarist", actor, and narrator through the use of intertitles.

== Early life ==
Born in Wisconsin in 1879, Arthur Berthelet was the third child of seven children of Louisa Matilda (née Thibault) and Joseph Reuben Berthelet, Jr. Both of Arthur's parents were Canadian natives, and his father supported the family working as a sewer-pipe manufacturer and later as a superintendent of the Milwaukee Cement Company. (Note: Arthur Berthelet in the federal census of 1930 identifies the place of birth for both of his parents as "Canada-English", although in earlier records Berthelet's father indicated he was born in 1844 in the "Indian Territory", in the north-central region of the United States bordering Canada.) There are conflicting records regarding Arthur's educational background. A biographical sketch of him in 1916, one published in October that year in an American film-studio directory, states that he studied at the University of Notre Dame after attending public schools in Milwaukee. Yet, Berthelet himself certifies in the United States Census of 1940 that he actually completed his education only through the eighth grade.

== Stage career ==
As early as 1899, twenty-year-old Berthelet is already identified in stage publications as a notable actor, who in that early period of his entertainment career was credited in reviews with his middle name "Rolette" instead of Arthur and with an Italianized surname, "Bertheletto". The San Francisco Dramatic Review, for example, reports in its October 21, 1899 issue about the performance of the play Magda starring Nance O'Neil and presented at the local California Theatre. Rolette Bertheletto is also highlighted in that production and complimented as "uncommonly good" in his role as Max, "the boylieutenant [sic] in love with his cousin Marie". Six months later, in the April 14, 1900 issue of The San Francisco Dramatic Review, a special correspondent for trade paper describes a production of Quo Vadis conducted by the Lyceum Stock Company in Denver, Colorado. Berthelet, still a member of that company, is commended by the correspondent for his role as "Chilo" and is once again recognized with "honors" for his performance.

Berthelet for several years continued to travel extensively with stock companies. During 1903–1904, he was advertised as one of the "prominent" support players in a "farewell revival" of The Two Orphans starring the legendary actress Kate Claxton, who since the 1870s had made a career of performing as "Louise" in the well-known French play. Yet, Berthelet did not limit his acting to traveling shows. He also performed regularly on Broadway, appearing there in a variety of Shakespearean and contemporary-based plays such as King Henry V (1900), Beaucaire (1902), A Man's World (1910), and His Wife by His Side (1912) Over that span of time, however, he began to combine more and more his duties as an actor with directing stage productions and later with managing stock companies himself. He was managing summer stock in Portsmouth, Ohio between 1909 and 1911, and then left that position to manage Lucille La Verne's company before moving on in 1914 to serve as stage director for Grayce Scott in Richmond, Virginia. The next year in Richmond, in its July 11, 1915 issue, the Richmond Times-Dispatch announces to its readership the departure of Berthelet's "Bijou Stock Company":

Richmond's theater patrons will bid a temporary farewell this week to Director Berthelet and his Bijou players, who have provided this city with some of the best performances seen here in years. The farewell production is to be a notable one, for Director Berthelet has selected "The Devil", the famous Hungarian comedy, for the closing offering, and is making every effort to insure its production's eclipsing anything he has yet offered here.
It is of particular interest to local patrons of the theater to learn of the romance suggested by the presentation of "The Devil" here. Director Berthelet and Miss [Leona] Ball were in the original Savage Company, and there met for the first time. (Note: Arthur Berthelet and Leona Ball married in Chicago five years earlier, on January 3, 1910. See "Illinois, Cook County Marriages, 1871–1968", Rollette A. Berthelet and Leona Ball, January 3, 1910, Chicago, Cook County, Illinois. Retrieved through limited subscription to FamilySearch archives database, Salt Lake City, Utah, March 23, 2022.) When the company started on tour, they were the honeymooners of the organization. Both Mr. Berthelet and his wife will appear in their original roles in the forthcoming production of "The Devil."

== Films ==
During the latter half of 1915, Berthelet began to transition professionally, moving from his career as a stage actor and as a director and manager of stock companies to working in the rapidly expanding motion picture industry. Essanay Studios in Chicago contracted him to direct several films, beginning with Tides That Meet, a three-reel romantic adventure set within "the unsettled conditions in Mexico". Released in early October 1915 and co-starring Bryant Washburn and Ann Kirk, the feature was widely promoted and popular with audiences for its "thrilling situations and hairbreadth escapes". Berthelet's next screen project for Essanay in 1915, another three-reeler, was Twice Into the Light. That melodrama starred John Lorenz and presented the story of a violinist who was born blind but ultimately found success musically and romantically after overcoming a series of physical and emotional struggles.

Following the positive film-industry and public reactions to Berthelet's first two projects, Essanay assigned him to direct longer, more elaborate "photoplays" such as The Misleading Lady (1916), The Primitive Strain (1916), Sherlock Holmes (1916), and Vultures of Society (1916).

=== Sherlock Holmes ===
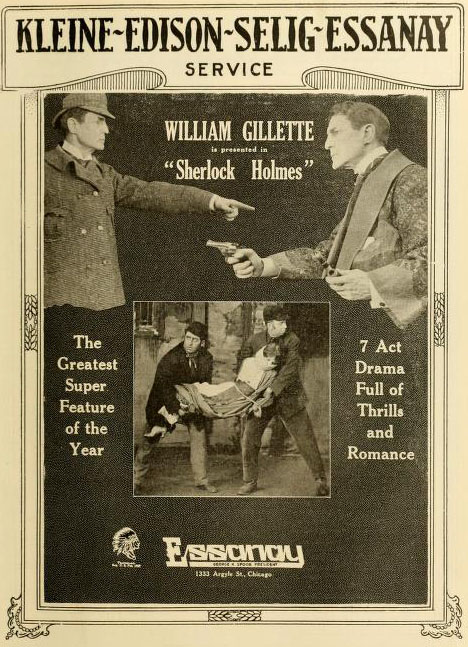

Sherlock Holmes proved to be an especially challenging and notable release for Berthelet. The production—the first American film to portray Sir Arthur Conan Doyle's very popular fictional detective—features American actor William Gillette, who since 1899 had already performed on stage as Sherlock Holmes hundreds of times on Broadway and in select theatres in Canada and England. (Note: Sherlock Holmes (1916) was for many decades classified as a lost film. In 2014, however, a complete duplicate negative of the motion picture was discovered in France. See Michael Phillips' May 21, 2015 Chicago Trubune article "Lost 'Sherlock Holmes' film shot in Chicago from 1916 found in France".) Widely recognized and celebrated for being the definitive interpreter of Holmes, Gillette was an authority on all of Doyle's related writings. Berthelet's own experience as a stage performer and his substantial knowledge of stage management made him an ideal director to adapt effectively a portrayal of Doyle's eloquent detective to a silent format dependent solely on pantomime and intertitles. In addition to directing an acclaimed expert in the role of Holmes, Berthelet had to film the seven-reel, 116-minute motion picture in Chicago and select exterior locations in that city to represent believably areas of London between the late Victorian and Edwardian eras. (Note: An extended digital copy (with additional restoration credits) of Berthelet's Sherlock Holmes for Essanay can be viewed here at the Internet Archive.) The results of his work received widespread accolades in 1916 film-industry publications and newspapers. Critic James S. McQuade of the New York trade journal The Moving Picture World praised Berthelet for the film's composition and general appearance, stating that "The settings are worthy of the acted production, and these and talented direction must be credited to Director Arthur Berthelet." In its assessment of the film, Motion Picture News, another widely read trade journal, judged the direction of this film version of Gillette's stage play as "excellent". The reviewer for Motography, Genevieve Harris, in her June 10, 1916 examination of Sherlock Holmes describes the film overall as "well produced" (Note: During the early silent era, the term "producer" was very often used interchangeably with "director". The distinction between the two film-production positions and their respective duties evolved over time and by the 1920s were referred to and credited separately.) but questions the decision to extend the picture's length to nearly two hours, a running time that she contends detrimentally affects the story's pacing and clarity in some parts:

Arthur Berthelet directed this screen version and has succeeded in presenting its thrills effectively. Many of the settings are interesting and unusual. Much of the photography is very good. A number of big scenes stand out prominently, in which the suspense is cleverly managed. But as a whole, seven reels seems lengthy; the play drags in the first part and some of the story is vague.

Although the critic for Motography found the running time of Sherlock Holmes too long, other prominent reviewers did not consider it excessive for presenting a thorough portrayal of Holmes. The New York Clipper, which in 1916 was promoted as "The Oldest Theatrical Journal in America", applauded Berthelet's work as both a critical and commercial achievement:

While seven reels seem a trifle lengthy, still the story, as unfolded, never wearies. It is all frank melodrama, which might seem a trifle exaggerated to some at the present day, but the way Sherlock Holmes is acted makes up for any structural defects of the play itself. Director Berthelet, who produced "The Havoc" for Essanay, has added another success to his list.

=== Final Essanay films, 1917–1918 ===
Berthelet continued to direct features and shorts at Essanay for two years after the release of Sherlock Holmes. The studio in 1917 released no less than ten of his productions. Some of those motion pictures include Little Shoes, The Saint's Adventure, The Golden Idiot, The Quarantined Bridegroom, Pants, and Young Mother Hubbard. In 1917, Berthelet also wrote the story that was later developed into Essanay's comedy crime drama Beauty and the Rogue, a production directed the next year by Berthelet's studio colleague Henry King. The next year, in 1918, before leaving Essanay, Berthelet completed two releases, one being his most controversial production, Men Who Have Made Love to Me. The latter motion picture, which is currently classified by the Library of Congress as a lost film, was adapted from a 1902 memoir written by feminist author and social activist Mary MacLane and published in 1902. Her book, simply titled The Story of Mary MacLane, recounts with, as one period publication described it, "astonishingly frank truths about herself" and six love affairs she had with men of different ages, marital circumstances, and from different educational, economic, and social backgrounds. Working with MacLane, who was naturally cast as the lead in a film version of her autobiographical work, and who co-wrote the screenplay, Berthelet had the tasks of tactfully adapting MacLane's sensational literary work to the screen, to craft a "seven-reel vampire photoplay" in a time when the physical aspects of having sex were customarily implied or symbolically represented.

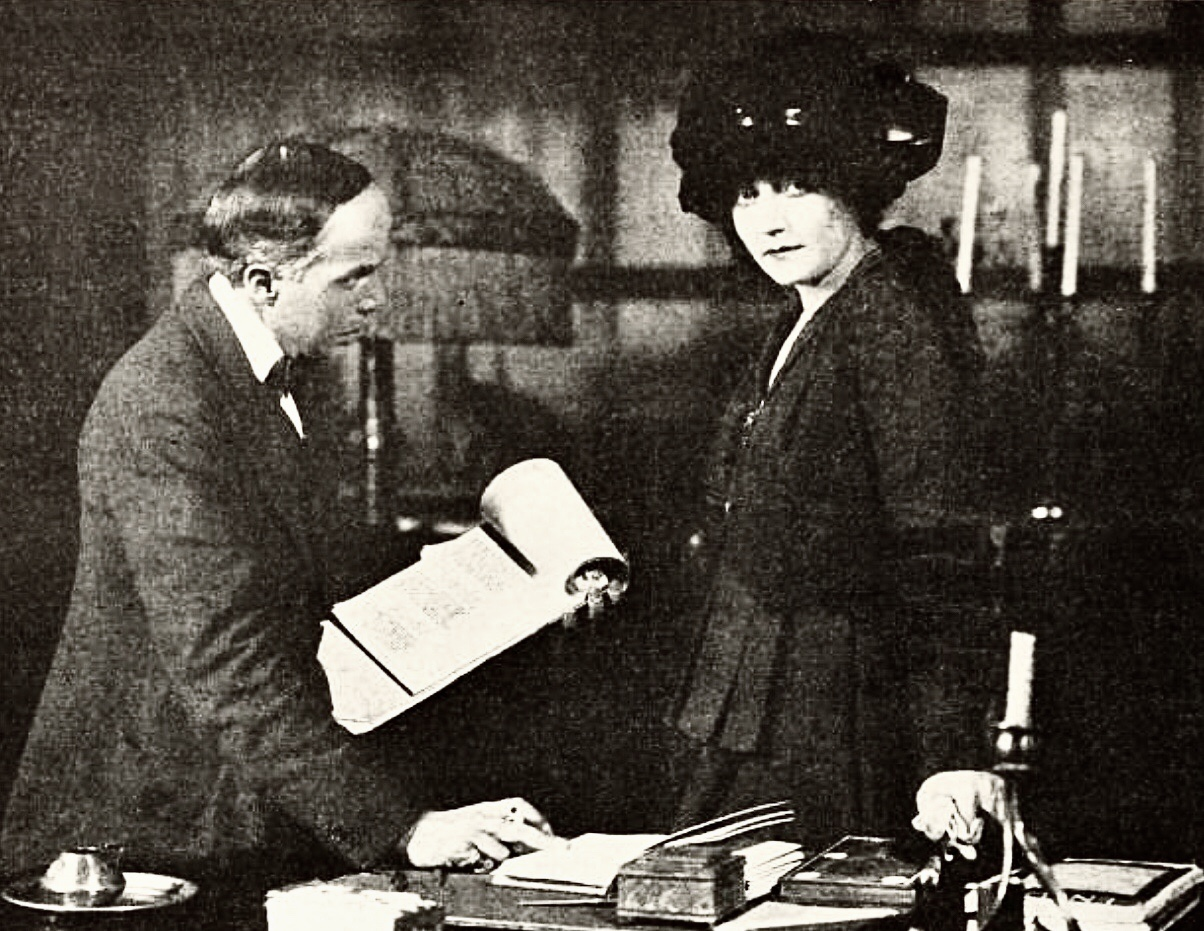
Berthelet and Mary MacLane reviewing script for Men Who Have Made Love to Me (1918)

From the outset of developing Men Who Have Made Love to Me, Berthelet sought to elevate public perceptions of the film's subject matter by establishing unusually high production values for the picture. Exhibitors Herald in October 1917 reported on the director's early development of sets for the project and attention to detail:

Some of the most elaborate and expensive sets ever used in a picture are being employed by Essanay in the forthcoming drama, "Men Who Have Made Love to Me"...One set represents an apartment in a richly appointed hotel. It contains eight rooms, arranged so that glimpses of all other seven rooms are obtained when the camera is trained in the spacious library. Where the average set can be erected in a few hours, Director Arthur Berthelet consumed several weeks in completing the apartment....The setting is correct in every detail. As an instance of the care being expended by Director Berthelet, in a sun room [sic] scene there is a wicker bird cage that blends with the wicker furniture. Mr. Berthelet held up the scene half a day until the right kind of a canary could be found for the cage.

== Retirement ==
By 1940, Berthelet continued to work as a freelance dialogue director, hired under contract by various film studios to assist in screening and training new actors and refining the on-camera speaking style and dialects of rising stars. Soon, though, he began to curtail his work in the movie business, a move likely prompted by his declining health due to advanced arteriosclerosis. Nevertheless, he is credited as a dialogue director up to late 1947, specifically for his work during the production of the 20th Century Fox film The Tender Years starring Joe E. Brown.

== Personal life and death ==
Berthelet married only once. In 1910, he and actress Leona Ball, an Arkansas native (1880—1958), wed after meeting and working together as cast members in the Savage Repertory Company's presentation of Molnár's play The Devil. The couple, who had two sons, Joseph and John, would remain together for nearly 40 years, until Arthur's death.

Twenty months after the release of the comedy The Tender Years in January 1948, Berthelet died while being treated for ongoing circulatory problems at Casa Del Mar Sanitarium near Vista, California, located approximately 100 miles southeast of Hollywood. According to his official death certificate, dated September 16, 1949, he died from a brain hemorrhage. He was survived by his wife Leona, their two sons, and by two of his brothers and two sisters. Following a memorial service at Berry Mortuary in Oceanside, California, Berthelet was buried at nearby Eternal Hills Memorial Park.

== Selected filmography ==
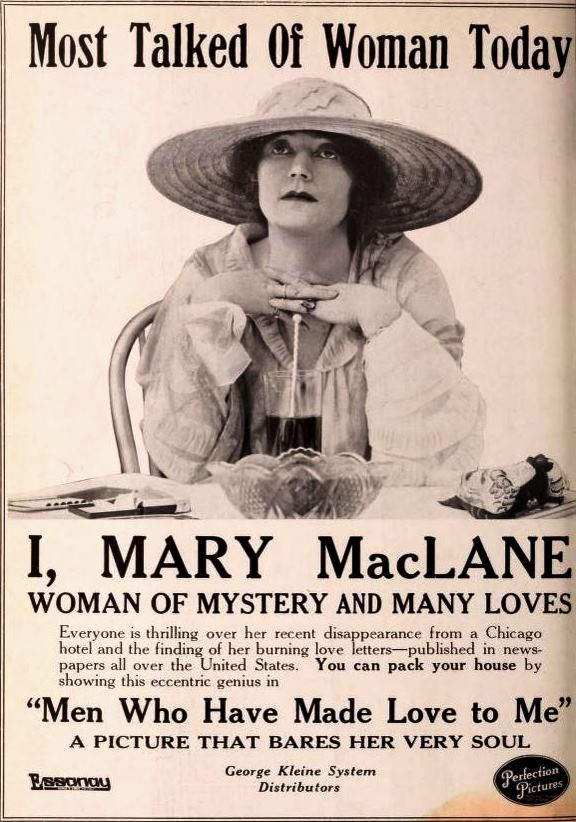
In 1918, Essanay assured theater owners that presentations of this controversial film would "pack your house".

- Enemies of Youth (1925)
- Penny of Top Hill Trail (1921)
- Young America (1918)
- The Lighted Lamp (1918)
- The Lie That Failed (1918)
- Men Who Have Made Love to Me (1918)
- Young Mother Hubbard (1917)
- Pants (1917)
- The Quarantined Bridegroom (1917)
- The Golden Idiot (1917)
- Aladdin Up-To-Date (1917)
- Where Is My Mother. (1917)
- Pass the Hash, Ann (1917)
- Our Boys (1917)
- The Saint's Adventure (1917)
- Little Shoes (1917)
- According to the Code (1916)
- Orphan Joyce (1916)
- The Chaperon (1916)
- The Return of Eve (1916)
- Sherlock Holmes (1916)
- The Havoc (1916)
- Vultures of Society (1916)
- The Misleading Lady (1916)
- The Primitive Strain (1916)
- Twice Into the Light (1915)
- Tides That Meet (1915)
