= Soliloquy =

Speech to oneself

Juliet delivers a soliloquy on the balcony, unaware that Romeo is listening in act 2, scene 2 of Romeo and Juliet.

A soliloquy (/səˈlɪl.ə.kwi, soʊˈlɪl.oʊ-/, from Latin solus 'alone' and loqui 'to speak', pl. soliloquies) is a monologue in drama in which a character speaks their thoughts aloud, typically while alone on stage or onscreen. It is used to reveal the character's inner feelings, motivations, or plans directly to the audience, providing information that would not otherwise be accessible through dialogue with other characters. They are used as a narrative device to deepen character development, advance the plot, and offer the audience a clearer understanding of the psychological or emotional state of the speaker. Soliloquies are distinguished from other monologues by their introspective nature and by the absence of, or disregard for, other characters on the stage.

The soliloquy became especially prominent during the Elizabethan and Jacobean periods, when playwrights used it as a means to explore complex human emotions and ethical dilemmas. William Shakespeare employed soliloquies extensively in his plays, using them to convey pivotal moments of decision, doubt, or revelation. Notable examples include Hamlet's "To be, or not to be" speech, which reflects on life and death, and Macbeth's contemplation of the consequences of regicide. Although the use of soliloquy declined in later theatrical traditions with the rise of realism, it has continued to appear in various forms across different genres, including film and television.

== Function ==
The primary function of a soliloquy is to provide audiences with direct and unmediated access to a character's internal thoughts, emotions, and motivations. Unlike dialogue, which involves interaction between characters, a soliloquy creates a situation where the character's private world is made publicly visible without the need for interaction with other characters. This device enables the dramatist to reveal psychological complexities, moral dilemmas, or conflicting desires that might otherwise remain hidden. By voicing inner thoughts, soliloquies offer audiences insights into a character's reasoning processes, emotional vulnerabilities, or ethical uncertainties, often deepening engagement with the narrative and enhancing the overall dramatic tension.

In addition to character development, soliloquies serve important structural purposes within dramatic works. They often function as expository tools, clarifying events that have occurred offstage, outlining future plans, or contextualizing relationships and conflicts. Through soliloquy, a playwright can convey information to the audience that other characters within the story are unaware of, thereby creating dramatic irony and heightening audience anticipation. In this sense, soliloquies are often instrumental in advancing the plot, preparing the audience for critical developments, or justifying actions that might otherwise appear abrupt or unmotivated.

Soliloquies also play a significant thematic role, allowing for the articulation of larger philosophical, political, or existential concerns embedded within a play. In many canonical examples, characters use soliloquies not only to discuss personal matters but also to meditate on broader questions about fate, power, identity, or mortality. These speeches can transform individual experience into commentary on universal human conditions, linking personal narrative to collective concerns. In this way, soliloquies often serve as vehicles for the playwright's thematic exploration and the play's engagement with contemporary social or metaphysical issues.

== Etymology ==
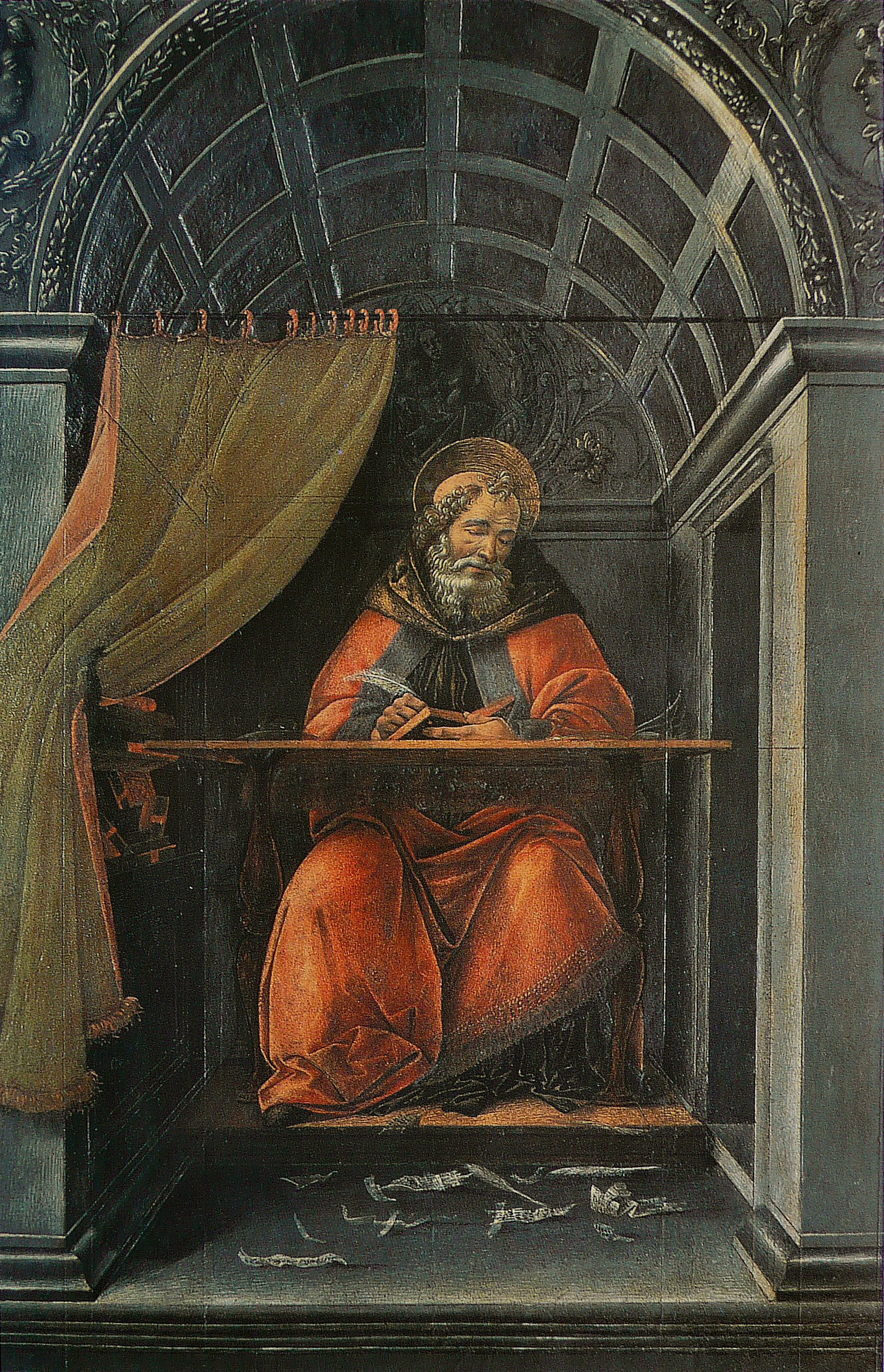
Saint Augustine in His Study by Sandro Botticelli, 1494, Uffizi Gallery

The word soliloquy derives from the Latin soliloquium, a compound of solus meaning "alone" and loqui meaning "to speak." The term was first recorded in English in the late 16th century, showing the increased attention to individual expression characteristic of Renaissance-era drama.

In its original Latin usage, soliloquium referred broadly to any form of self-directed speech or internal dialogue. Early Christian writers, notably Saint Augustine in his work Soliloquia (circa 386–387 CE), employed the term to describe philosophical and spiritual meditations conducted internally or spoken aloud. Augustine's use of the concept emphasized introspection and the search for divine truth through self-examination.

In the context of English literature and drama, the meaning of soliloquy became more narrowly defined. It came to refer specifically to a dramatic device wherein a character speaks their thoughts aloud, usually while alone on stage or under the assumption of being unheard. This more specific theatrical application became especially prominent during the Elizabethan and Jacobean periods, most notably in the works of William Shakespeare and his contemporaries.

== History ==
=== Origins to early renaissance ===
Soliloquy-like addresses appear in ancient Greek drama, where characters onstage occasionally break from dialogue to speak directly to the chorus or audience, conveying personal reflections or contextual commentary. In tragedies by Euripides, for example, protagonists such as Medea articulate their motivations and emotional turmoil in asides that frame their subsequent actions. These instances, while integrated within a broader choral structure, establish an early precedent for isolating a single voice in dramatic discourse.

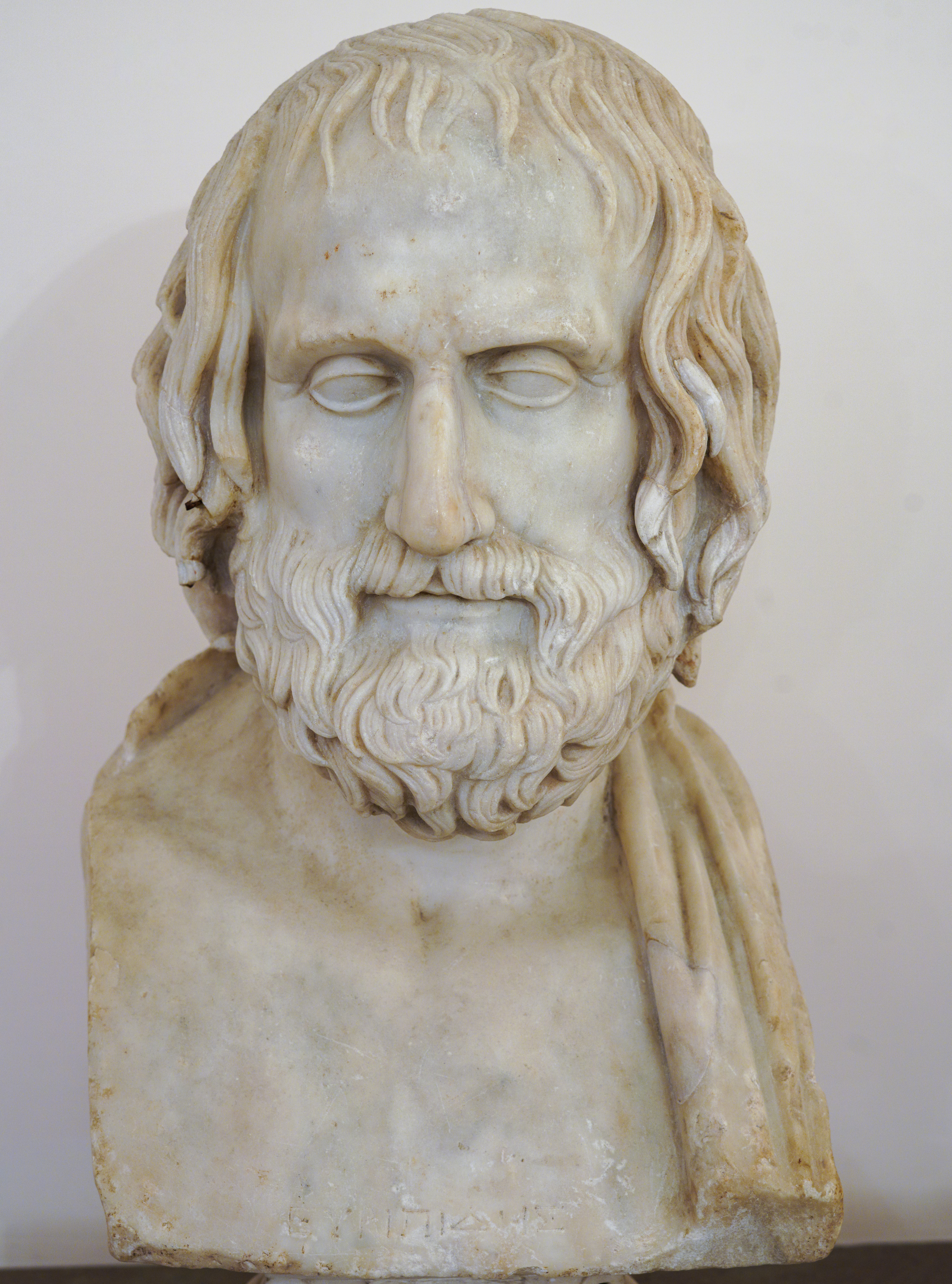
Bust of Euripides, a classical Greek tragedian

Roman tragedy, particularly in the works of Seneca (c. 4 BC–AD 65), develops this technique further. Senecan plays frequently include lengthy speeches in which characters meditate on themes of fate, vengeance, and moral decay. Delivered without response from other figures onstage, these monologues concentrate character psychology and foreshadow the more formal soliloquy of later periods. The Senecan model influenced medieval and Renaissance writers, who adopted and adapted its emphasis on internal deliberation.

During the medieval period, liturgical dramas and morality plays featured allegorical personifications—such as Vice, Virtue, or the character of Everyman—who delivered extended monologues to articulate moral lessons and spiritual introspection. These speeches, though primarily didactic, rely on direct address to engage the congregation as audience, reinforcing the dramatic potential of solitary speech. By the fifteenth century, with the rise of secular theatre in vernacular languages, playwrights began to shift focus toward individual characterization. Protagonists in early secular dramas spoke their private intentions and internal debates aloud, laying the groundwork for the fully realized soliloquy that would emerge in early modern theatre.

=== English Renaissance and neoclassical reaction ===
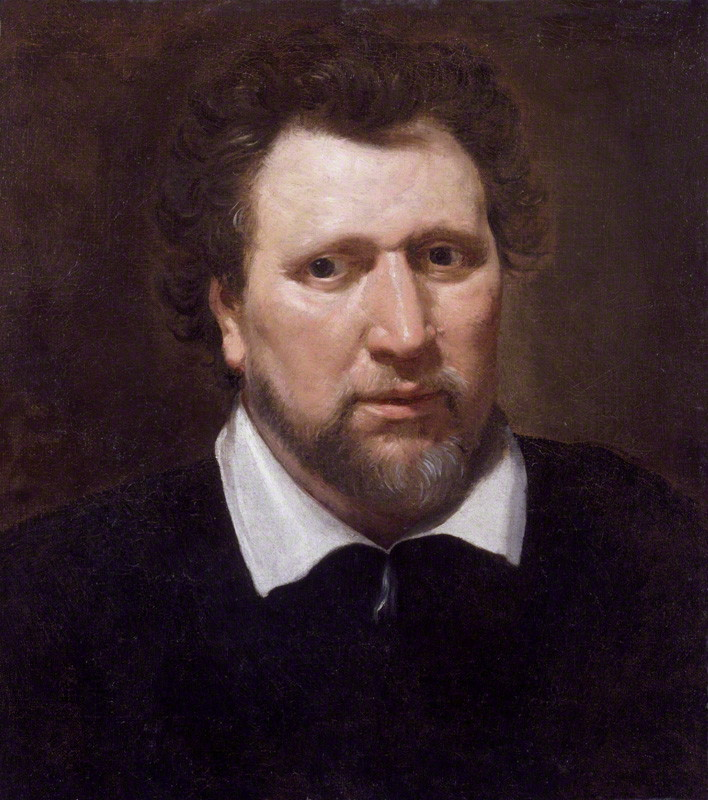
Circa 1617 portrait of Ben Jonson

The soliloquy achieved its greatest formal refinement during the English Renaissance, particularly between the 1580s and the early 1620s. Playwrights such as Christopher Marlowe, Thomas Kyd, and Ben Jonson employed extended solo speeches to reveal hidden motives, advance intricate plots, and heighten dramatic irony. William Shakespeare's works exemplify the period's mastery of the form. In his Richard II, the king's soliloquies articulate the psychological toll of political upheaval, whereas in Macbeth, the title character's "If it were done when 'tis done" speech dramatizes his moral hesitation. Shakespeare's versatility extended the soliloquy into comedic contexts as well, as in As You Like It, where Rosalind's disguised reflections deepen themes of identity and love.

From the mid-seventeenth century onward, neoclassical criticism—a movement striving for realism which was rooted in renewed readings of Aristotle's Poetics—began to challenge the dramatic conventions of the Renaissance stage. French and English theorists advocated for the unities of time, place, and action, and insisted upon decorum in presenting characters' speech. Direct addresses to the audience were deemed artificial intrusions that threatened the believability of the dramatic illusion. As a consequence, playwrights during the Restoration and early eighteenth century largely abandoned traditional soliloquy, instead employing confidants, asides, or narrative exposition to convey interiority.

Despite critical censure, the influence of the Renaissance-style soliloquy endured in modified forms. Actors continued to experiment with discreet asides and voice-over techniques, and writers retained the strategy of revealing character thoughts through creative staging or epistolary devices. By the late eighteenth century, the growing interest in individual psychology in both drama and the emerging novel helped rehabilitate the soliloquy's central function: providing audiences with direct access to a character's inner life, even as its classical form remained in abeyance.

=== Revival and modern period ===
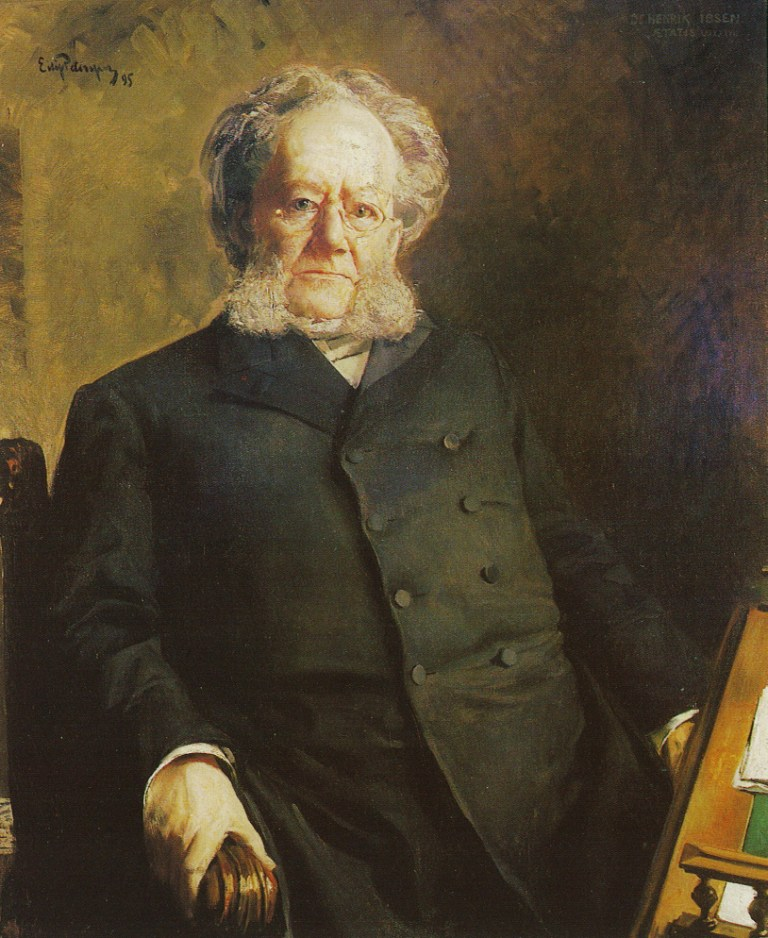
Painting of Henrik Ibsen in 1895

During the Romantic and Victorian periods, soliloquy-like monologues reemerged as a means of expressing individual consciousness and emotional intensity. Although these speeches were technically monologues, they functioned similarly to soliloquies. Poetic dramas by authors such as Percy Bysshe Shelley and Robert Browning featured extended speeches that foregrounded characters' inner experiences. In the theatre, actors and directors explored staging techniques—such as focused spotlighting and restrained movement—to emphasize the psychological dimensions of these speeches.

In the twentieth century, developments in dramatic realism and naturalism led playwrights to favor subtler forms of interior expression. Henrik Ibsen and Anton Chekhov, for example, employed indirect dialogue and nuanced subtext in place of overt soliloquies, while still addressing characters' unspoken thoughts. Concurrently, the advent of film and television introduced voice-over narration and direct-to-camera asides, adapting the soliloquy's function of providing audience access to a character's private reflections within new media formats.

Contemporary drama and screenwriting continue to incorporate soliloquy-inspired techniques across diverse genres. Experimental theatre often integrates metatheatrical commentary and interactive staging to reengage audiences in the performative act of self-address. In digital media—including graphic novels, video games, and virtual reality experiences—internal monologues and aside conventions also still persist.

== Evolution in modern media ==
In contemporary media, particularly in film and television, the soliloquy has evolved into related narrative techniques that fulfill similar functions of revealing a character's internal thoughts. While direct soliloquies, as traditionally conceived in theater, have become less common, their essence persists through various modern forms that adapt to the demands of narrative realism and audiovisual storytelling.

One prevalent technique is the use of voice-over narration, wherein a character's inner monologue is presented alongside visual action. This method allows filmmakers to maintain the appearance of naturalistic dialogue while providing psychological depth and commentary on unfolding events. For example, the film Taxi Driver (1976) utilizes extensive internal narration to convey the protagonist's alienation, anger, and descent into violence, allowing audiences access to thoughts that are not expressed outwardly.

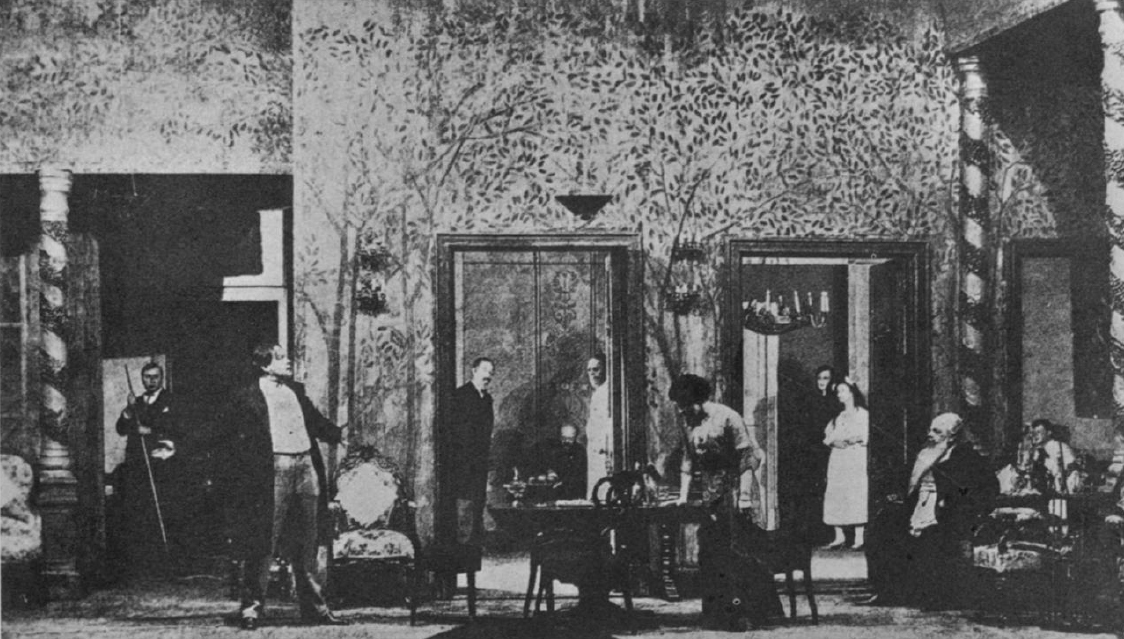
In Stanislavski's production of The Cherry Orchard (Moscow Art Theatre, 1904), a three-dimensional box set gives the illusion of a real room. The actors act as if unaware of the audience, separated by an invisible "fourth wall", defined by the proscenium arch.

Another significant adaptation is the breaking of the fourth wall, in which characters address the audience directly. This technique establishes immediacy and intimacy, functioning similarly to traditional soliloquy by exposing a character's private experiences and emotions. Television series such as House of Cards (2013–2018) and Fleabag (2016–2019) make extensive use of direct address, blending dramatic realism with self-aware commentary, and reviving the soliloquy's role as a bridge between character and audience.

In addition to verbal forms, visual storytelling has increasingly fulfilled the role of internal revelation. Through cinematography, editing, and non-verbal performance, filmmakers and showrunners depict a character's internal state without the need for explicit speech. Scenes of solitude, symbolic imagery, and musical accompaniment often serve to externalize a character's thoughts and emotions, suggesting psychological depth traditionally conveyed through spoken soliloquy. In this way, the core function of the soliloquy—providing insight into a character's inner life—has remained vital, even as its formal characteristics have evolved to align with the conventions of modern audiovisual media.

== Criticisms and reception ==
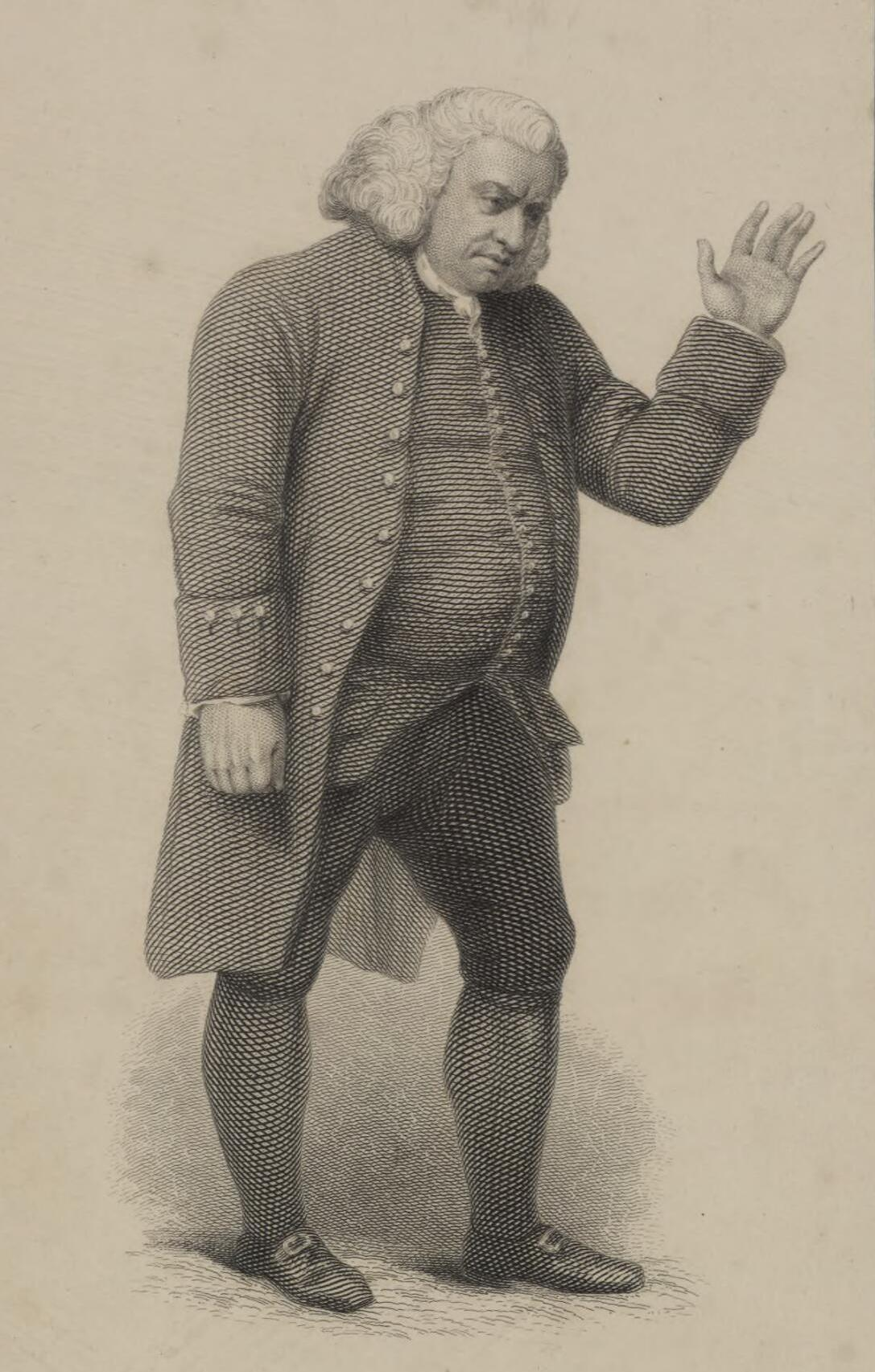
Portrait of Samuel Johnson from 1770

The use of soliloquy has been the subject of extensive critical discussion across different historical periods. Critics have long praised the soliloquy for its ability to provide audiences with direct access to a character's innermost thoughts, allowing for a deeper understanding of personal motivations, emotional conflicts, and philosophical dilemmas. Particularly during the Renaissance, the soliloquy was valued for its rhetorical sophistication and its exploration of human consciousness. William Shakespeare's use of soliloquy, exemplified by speeches such as Hamlet's "To be, or not to be," has been regarded by literary critics as a pinnacle of dramatic introspection, demonstrating the soliloquy's capacity to engage audiences with universal themes of existence, morality, and doubt. Scholars such as Samuel Johnson in the 18th century recognized the soliloquy's effectiveness in revealing character psychology, while later critics, including A.C. Bradley and Harold Bloom, emphasized its role in constructing complex and enduring literary figures.

However, the advent of theatrical realism in the 19th century led to growing criticism of the soliloquy as an unnatural or contrived device. Realist playwrights such as Henrik Ibsen and later Anton Chekhov sought to create drama grounded in everyday speech and behavior, where characters would not realistically voice private thoughts aloud. In this context, soliloquies were often seen as a break from the illusion of reality, and their use declined significantly in serious dramatic works. In the 20th century, especially with the rise of modernism and postmodernism, critical reception of the soliloquy became more favorable once again, though often with new methods. Playwrights and theorists such as Bertolt Brecht and Samuel Beckett experimented with forms of direct audience address, using soliloquy-like devices to highlight the constructed nature of theater and to disrupt traditional narrative immersion.

== Shakespearean soliloquy ==
William Shakespeare, who used soliloquies often in his works

Shakespeare employed soliloquies to reveal the inner deliberations of characters at critical junctures. These speeches typically occur when a character is alone onstage or believes themselves unobserved, and they serve to clarify motivations, present unfolding decisions, and heighten dramatic tension. Shakespeare's soliloquies often introduce or resolve conflicts: they may pose ethical dilemmas, expose hidden ambitions, or signal a shift in purpose. The speeches use concise imagery, balanced phrasing, and direct address to maintain focus and to underscore key thematic concerns such as identity, power, and mortality.

Across genres, Shakespeare adapts soliloquy form to suit dramatic needs. In tragedies, soliloquies articulate crisis points—moments of doubt or resolve that propel the action forward. In comedies, they can underscore disguise and mistaken identity by letting characters comment on their own duplicity. In history plays, soliloquies convey political uncertainty and personal ambition, linking individual agency to broader social change. By juxtaposing public dialogue with private speech, these soliloquies create layers of meaning that inform both character development and audience expectation.

=== In Macbeth ===
Macbeth's soliloquies reveal his struggle between ambition and conscience. In "If it were done when 'tis done" (Act 1, Scene 7), he lists reasons for and against killing King Duncan, noting that regicide teaches "bloody instructions" that return to "plague the inventor." In the dagger-vision speech (Act 2, Scene 1), he sees a floating dagger leading him to Duncan's chamber, a sign of his guilt and determination. By the "Tomorrow, and tomorrow, and tomorrow" speech (Act 5, Scene 5), Macbeth describes life as "a tale told by an idiot," reflecting his view that time has reduced human action to meaningless repetition.

=== In Hamlet ===
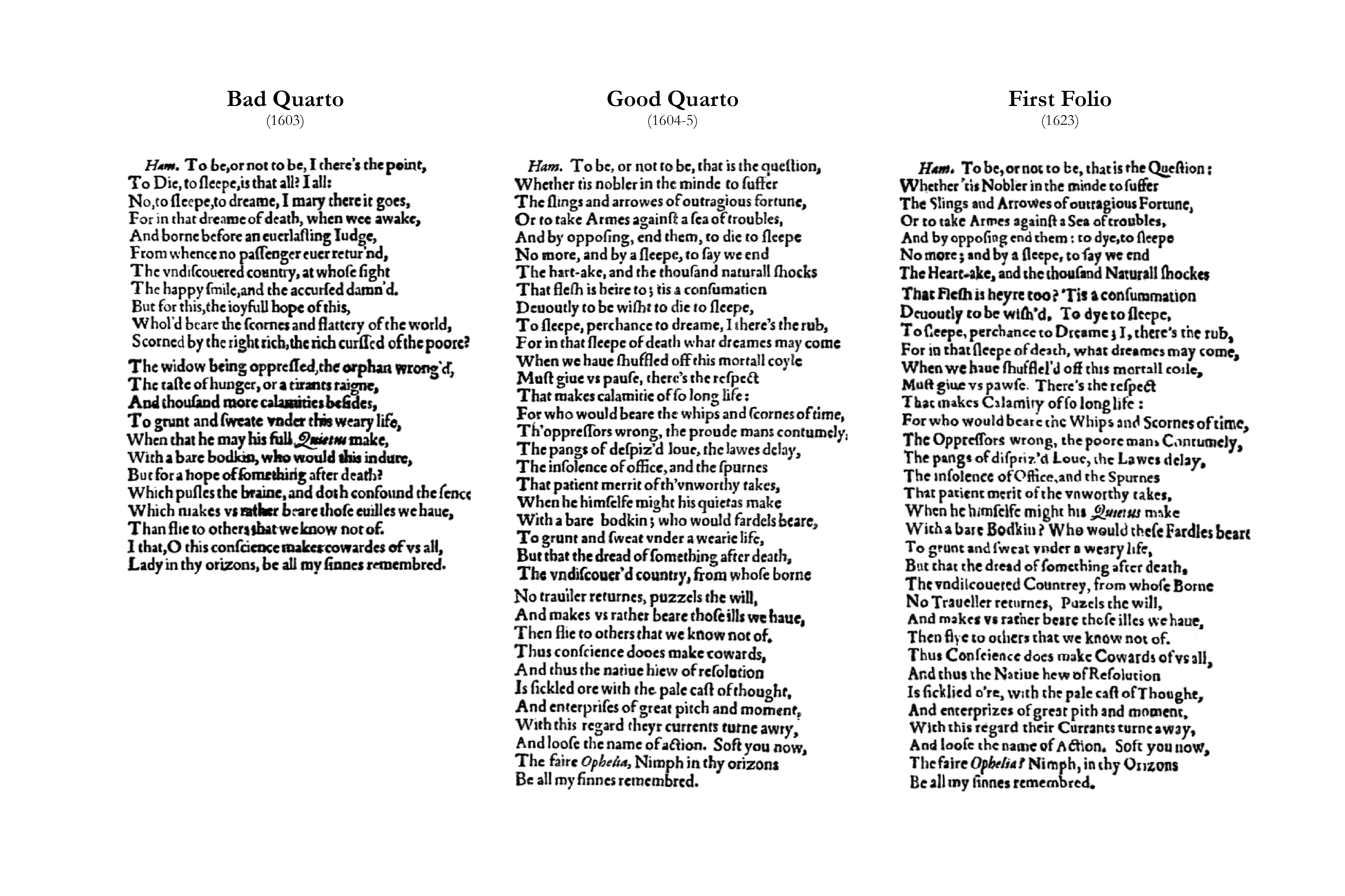
Comparison of the "To be, or not to be" speech in the first three editions of Hamlet, showing the varying quality of the text in the Bad Quarto, the Good Quarto, and the First Folio.

Hamlet's soliloquies trace his shifting thoughts and decisions. In "To be, or not to be" (Act 3, Scene 1), he compares life to death, weighing "the slings and arrows of outrageous fortune" against the unknown of what follows. While some critics have argued that this may not be a genuine soliloquy, but rather a calculated act of feigned madness meant to deceive, others consider it to be a genuine expression of Hamlet's innermost thoughts, which is crucial to the action of the play. In "O, what a rogue and peasant slave am I" (Act 2, Scene 2), he chastises himself for delay and resolves to use the players' performance to expose King Claudius. During the prayer-scene speech (Act 3, Scene 3), he debates killing Claudius while he prays, aware that murder at prayer might grant him "purgation" rather than punishment.

=== In Richard II ===
Richard II's soliloquies chart his fall from power. In the opening speech (Act 1, Scene 1), he claims that no force can remove "the balm off from an anointed king," linking his authority to divine right. After his deposition, in "I have no name, no title" (Act 4, Scene 1), he uses broken lines and repetition to show loss of identity. His later meditations turn from pride to humility.

=== In Shakespeare's other works ===
- In Othello, Iago's soliloquies (Act 2, Scene 1; Act 3, Scene 3) state his plan to deceive Othello, using clear, direct language to outline each step.
- In As You Like It, Rosalind's soliloquy (Act 3, Scene 2) questions the nature of love while she is disguised as Ganymede, drawing on pastoral images to test Orlando's feelings.
- Edgar's "Poor Tom" speeches in King Lear (Act 3, Scene 4; Act 4, Scene 1) adopt a feigned madman's voice to expose human suffering.
- In Julius Caesar, Brutus's address (Act 2, Scene 1) justifies assassination with the line "Not that I loved Caesar less, but that I loved Rome more."

== Examples in non-Shakespearean drama ==
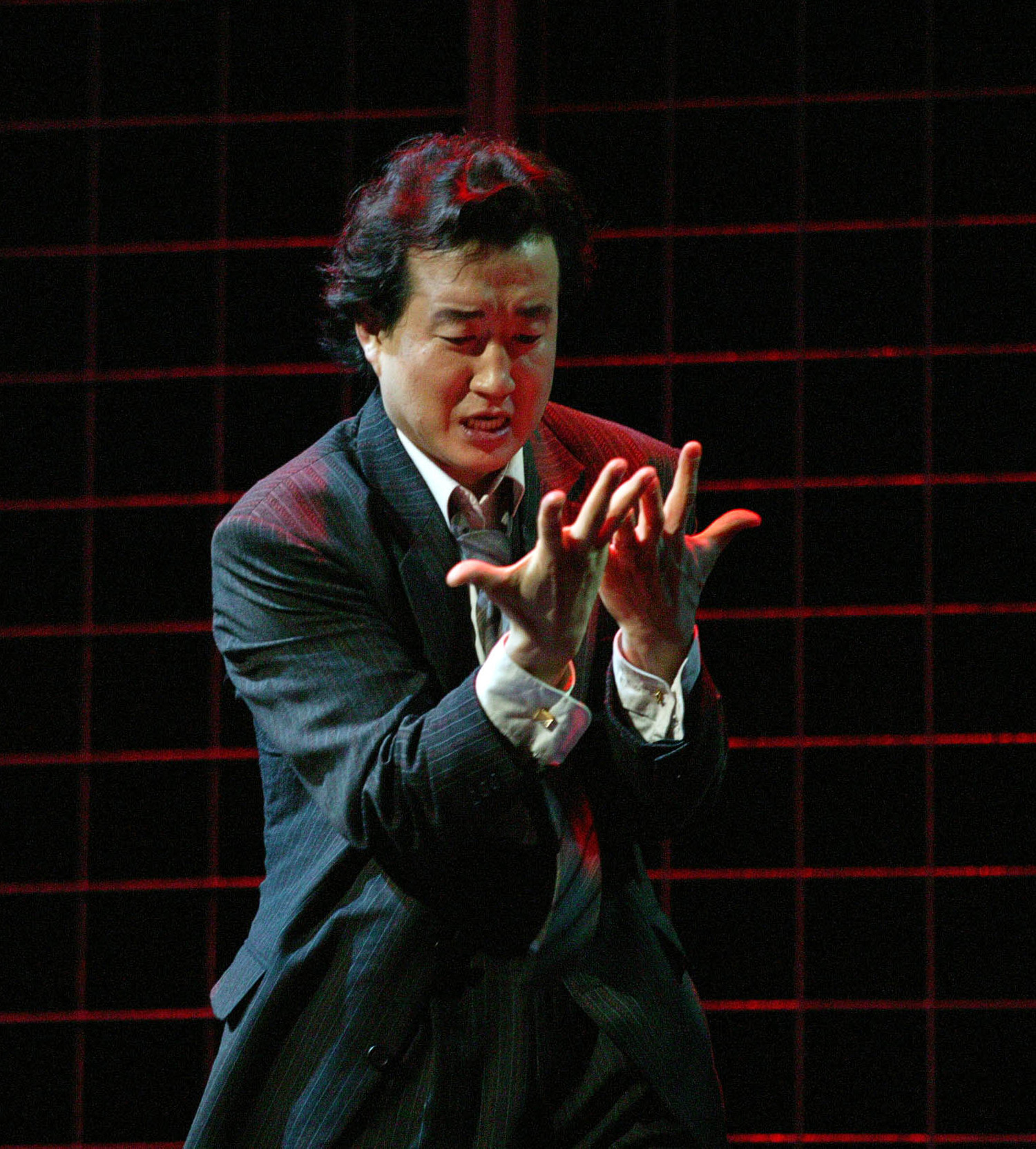
Faust (Jaewoo Kim) realizes the consequences of his actions.

=== Early modern period ===
- In Christopher Marlowe's Doctor Faustus (1604), the title character delivers several soliloquies that articulate his inner turmoil regarding his pact with the devil. In the final act, Faustus's soliloquy conveys his despair and futile hope for redemption.

=== 19th century ===
- Henrik Ibsen's A Doll's House (1879) features moments where Nora Helmer engages in monologue-like reflections, particularly in the later scenes, as she contemplates her identity and the constraints imposed by her marriage. These passages function similarly to traditional soliloquies by revealing her internal conflict to the audience.
- Johann Wolfgang von Goethe's Faust (Part I published in 1808) also employs soliloquy as a central device. Faust frequently speaks alone on stage, particularly in the early scenes, articulating his dissatisfaction with human knowledge and his longing for deeper meaning, leading to his fateful agreement with Mephistopheles.

=== 20th century ===
- Arthur Miller's Death of a Salesman (1949) includes frequent soliloquy-like passages delivered by Willy Loman. These speeches expose his disillusionment, aspirations, and mental fragmentation, particularly during scenes where the boundary between memory and reality becomes blurred.
- In Tennessee Williams's The Glass Menagerie (1944), Tom Wingfield serves both as a character and as the narrator. His reflective monologues frame the narrative and express his feelings of guilt, frustration, and desire for freedom, closely resembling the function of soliloquy.
- Jean-Paul Sartre's No Exit (1944), while primarily structured through dialogue, contains moments where characters such as Garcin and Estelle deliver introspective speeches. These moments resemble soliloquies in their direct revelation of internal struggles as the characters come to terms with the nature of their punishment.

== Non-western drama ==
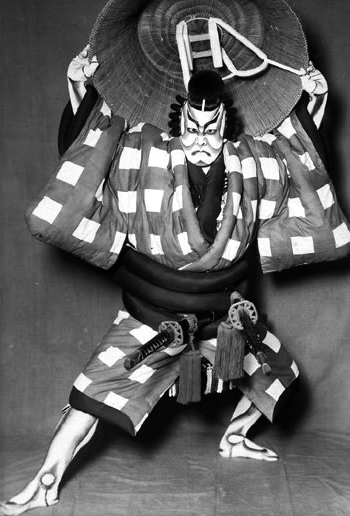
Onoe Kikugorō VI as Umeō-maru in Sugawara Denju Tenarai Kagami

While the soliloquy is most closely associated with Western theatrical traditions, particularly European Renaissance-era drama, comparable techniques have appeared in various forms in non-Western theatrical and literary cultures. These methods similarly function to reveal a character's internal thoughts, emotions, or moral conflicts to the audience.

In classical Indian Sanskrit drama, notably in the works of Kālidāsa and Bhāsa, characters occasionally engage in spoken reflections that approximate the function of the soliloquy. These speeches often occur during transitional scenes and serve to inform the audience of the character's inner dilemmas, romantic feelings, or strategic intentions. The nāyaka (hero) or nāyikā (heroine) frequently voices internal debates or emotional states through structured monologues that blend poetry and prose.

Traditional Japanese theater forms, such as Noh and Kabuki, also incorporate elements similar to soliloquy. In Noh drama, the shite (main character) often delivers extended lyrical passages that articulate memories, regrets, or hidden desires, typically accompanied by stylized movement and music. These speeches are not addressed to other characters but are performed for the audience's contemplation. In Kabuki, actors may engage in monogatari (narrative speech) or use mie (stylized poses) combined with spoken asides to reveal a character's innermost thoughts, achieving effects similar to soliloquy.

In Chinese traditional opera, particularly in Kunqu and Peking opera, moments of self-address through arias or spoken passages are employed to express inner conflict or resolve. These performances often integrate music, gesture, and symbolic movement to externalize psychological states without relying exclusively on dialogue with other characters.

== Comparison with monologue ==
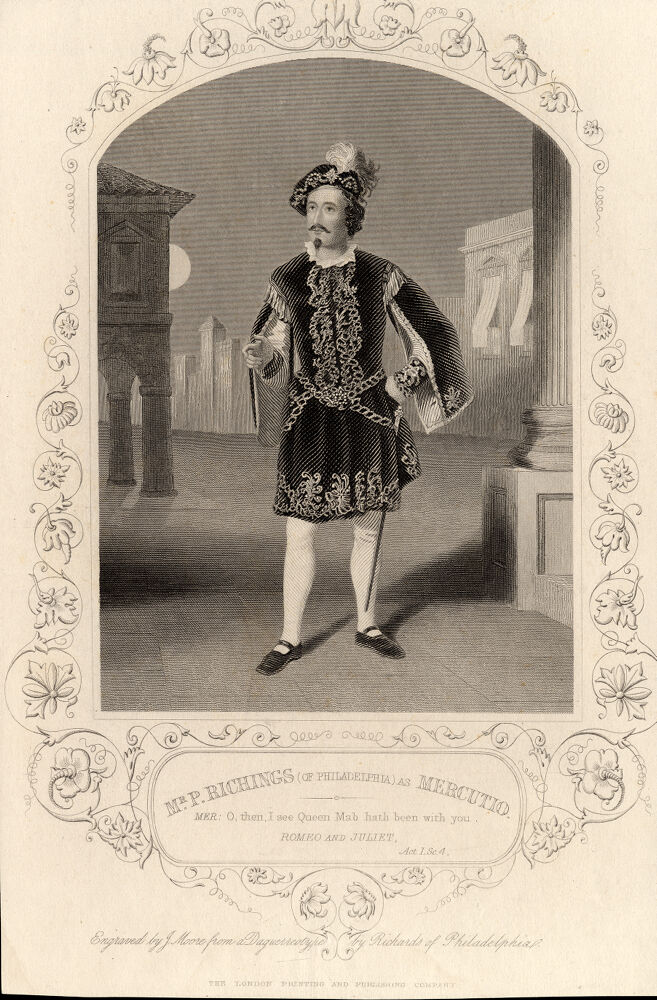
Mercutio's Queen Mab speech in Romeo and Juliet is a famous example of a monologue, but is not a soliloquy.

Although the terms "soliloquy" and "monologue" are sometimes used interchangeably in casual discussion, they refer to distinct forms within dramatic literature and performance, differentiated primarily by the intended audience and the dramatic context. A soliloquy is a speech delivered by a character who is alone on stage or who believes themselves to be alone, addressing only themselves or, indirectly, the audience. Its primary purpose is to reveal internal thoughts, emotions, and motivations that are otherwise inaccessible to other characters within the narrative. The soliloquy assumes that no other characters are present to hear the speech, thereby creating an intimate connection between the speaker and the audience, who are positioned as silent witnesses to the character's private world.

By contrast, a monologue is a broader term that refers to any extended speech by a single character, regardless of whether other characters are present. Monologues may be addressed to other characters within the drama, to the audience, or even remain ambiguous in their intended target. Unlike soliloquies, monologues can serve a wide range of functions, including persuasion, narration, exposition, or reflection. In many cases, a monologue is part of an ongoing dialogue, while a soliloquy typically halts the progression of the surrounding action to focus exclusively on the speaker's internal state.

In practical terms, the distinction lies as much in dramatic convention as in textual form. For example, in Shakespeare's plays, a character delivering a soliloquy, such as Macbeth contemplating regicide, speaks with the expectation that no other characters can hear him, whereas a character delivering a monologue, such as Mark Antony's funeral oration in Julius Caesar, addresses other characters and the assembled audience within the narrative world. Modern drama and film have at times blurred the lines between these two forms, employing internal monologues voiced over action, or soliloquy-like speeches delivered in settings where other characters are technically present but ignored for dramatic effect.
