= George Kirke Spoor =

American film producer

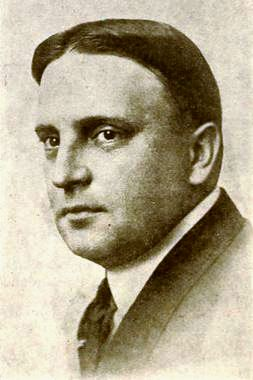
- Spoor in 1919
- Born: December 18, 1871; Highland Park, Illinois, U.S.
- Died: November 24, 1953 (aged 81); Chicago, Illinois, U.S.
- Spouse: Ada May Thompson (1877–1951)
- Children: Gertrude Keith Spoor (1893–1975)
- Parent(s): Marvin Spoor (1839–1927); Catherine Stressinger (1853–1947)

George Kirke Spoor (December 18, 1871 – 24 November 1953) was an early film pioneer who, with Gilbert M. "Broncho Billy" Anderson, founded Essanay Studios in Chicago in 1907. He was a founding partner of V-L-S-E, Incorporated, a film distribution firm, in 1915.

== Biography ==
Spoor and Anderson were responsible for discovering stars such as Wallace Beery, Francis X. Bushman, Ben Turpin, Gloria Swanson and Charlie Chaplin. Allan Dwan, who was hired as a screenwriter, went on to become a famous Hollywood director. Louella Parsons, also hired by Spoor as a screenwriter, later became a famous Hollywood gossip columnist.

In 1894, while box office manager of the Phoenix Opera House in Waukegan, Illinois, George K. Spoor teamed up with the inventor Edward Hill Amet (1860–1948) to build and exhibit "The Magniscope", the first practical 35 mm movie projector ever designed and used in a large audience display. Spoor and Amet made films and distributed them with this device before the 1895 device by the Lumière brothers of France. Thomas Edison's more famous Kinetoscope was exhibited in 1891, but was only able to be viewed by one person at a time through a peephole.

Spoor and Amet are credited for having filmed: the world's first newsreel, a film of the first inauguration of President William McKinley in 1897; the first use of film miniatures (The Battle of Santiago Bay) in which tin replicas and cigar smoke created the illusion of live war footage; the first to experience local censorship (due to the graphic images of China's Boxer Rebellion); the first "fake newsreel" in which Spoor used neighbors to act out battles such as the Battle of San Juan Hill in a local park.

Spoor is also remembered for having produced, in 1918, the movie Men Who Have Made Love to Me by controversial feminist Mary MacLane, the first serious cinematic work to break the fourth wall. and the first to unite writer, narrator, subject, and star.

In 1926, Spoor and P. John Berggren invented "Natural Vision", an early 65 mm widescreen process which was only used for a few films, including Niagara Falls (1926), Rollercoaster Ride (1926), The American (1927) and Danger Lights (RKO Radio Pictures, 1930). The trademark Natural Vision was later used for an unrelated system of making 3-D films in 1953.

In 1948, Spoor received an Oscar, specifically an Academy Honorary Award, for his contribution to developing motion pictures as entertainment.

He died on November 24, 1953.

== Selected filmography ==
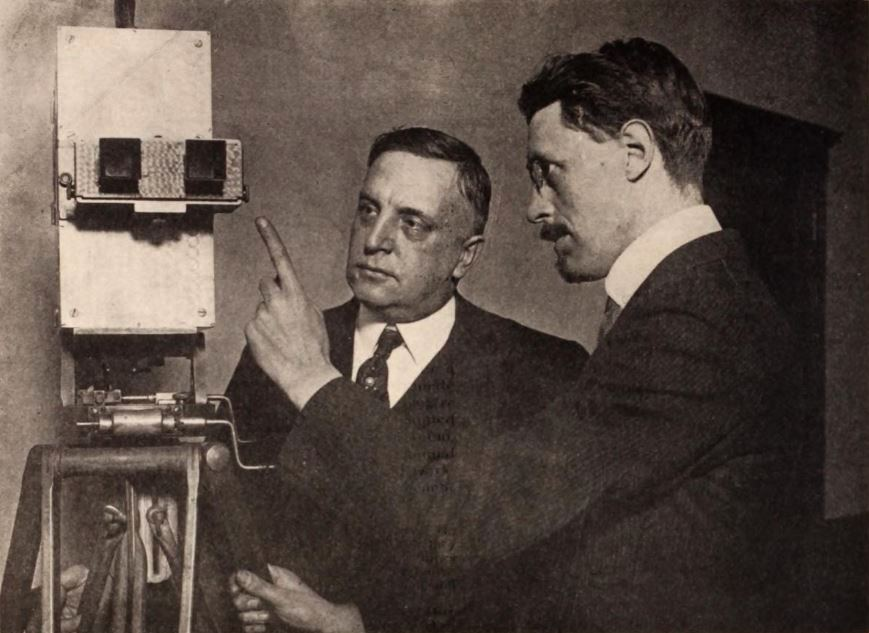
George Kirke Spoor and P. John Berggren, 1921

Spoor is credited with having been the producer of:

- Ben Gets a Duck and Is Ducked (1909), starring Ben Turpin
- A Burlesque on Carmen (1915), starring Edna Purviance, directed by Charlie Chaplin
- Men Who Have Made Love to Me (1918), starring Mary MacLane, Ralph Graves and Paul Harvey
- A Pair of Sixes (1918), starring Taylor Holmes
- The American (1927), starring Bessie Love and Charles Ray
