= Edward H. Amet =

American inventor and electrical engineer

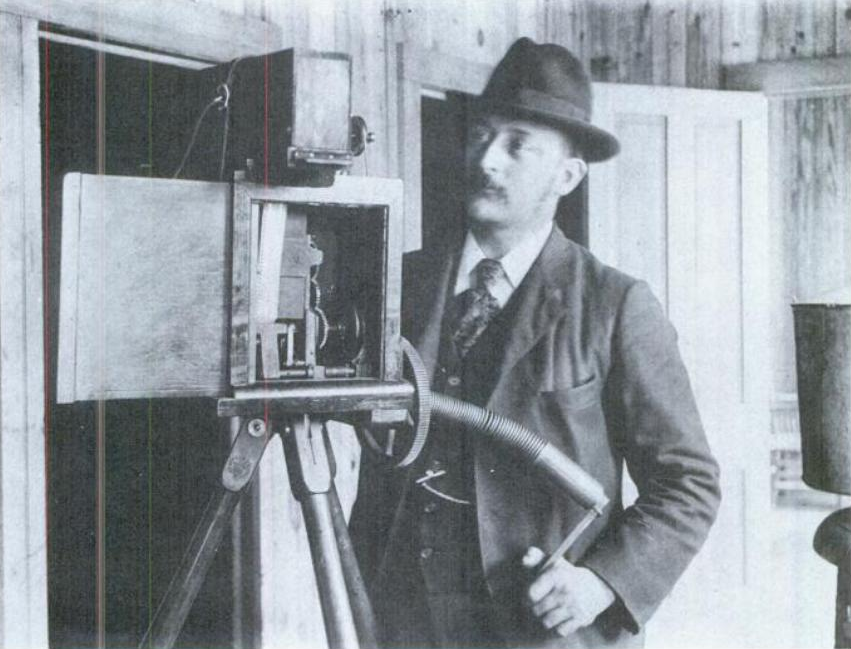
Edward H. Amet with his magniscope

Edward Hill Amet (November 10, 1860 – August 16, 1948) was an American inventor and electrical engineer, best known for his contributions to the early motion picture industry. His magniscope was one of the first devices that projected moving pictures on vertical surfaces. Along with George Kirke Spoor, Amet produced a series of war films.

== Biography ==
Edward Hill Amet was born on November 10, 1860, in Philadelphia, Pennsylvania. He trained as an electrical engineer and worked for a time with Thomas Edison. In November 1891, Amet designed the first spring-wound motor for phonographs, first sold in 1894 (w/ 1-, 2-, 4-mainsprings). His inexpensive 'Echophone' (originally known as the Metaphone, "meta" an anagram of his name) was the first cylinder phonograph with a distinct tone arm. However, the American Graphophone Company sued Amet over perceived infringements and its manufacture was suspended in 1896. The first Metaphones did not use a coiled spring for tension on the glass tube, but simply used an over-hanging weight to maintain contact between the stylus and the record - a bubble-level was inserted in the base which could thus be raised and lowered with a vertical adjustment screw.

In 1894, Amet teamed up with Waukegan, Illinois, theater manager George Kirke Spoor to finance a new projector, the magniscope. The magniscope was lightweight (about 70 pounds (32 kg)) and showed pictures with less vibration. The magniscope was a success and was sold to several high-profile theaters. Edison sued Amet, but because Amet decided to contest the charges in court, Edison dropped the case. Amet worked with Spoor to produce films to exemplify the capabilities of the machine. He made a series of war films, shooting footage from staged military camps and using miniatures in a bathtub to simulate naval battles. Amet ceased producing the magniscope in 1900 after the release of the polyscope by the Selig Polyscope Company, selling his share to Spoor.

In 1911, Amet returned to film when he designed the Audo-Moto-Photo, a combination phonograph and film projector. The phonograph recorder was linked directly to the camera, allowing for the first synchronized sound. However, the invention may not have performed reliably. Amet died on August 16, 1948, in Redondo Beach, California.
