= The American (1927 film) =

1927 film

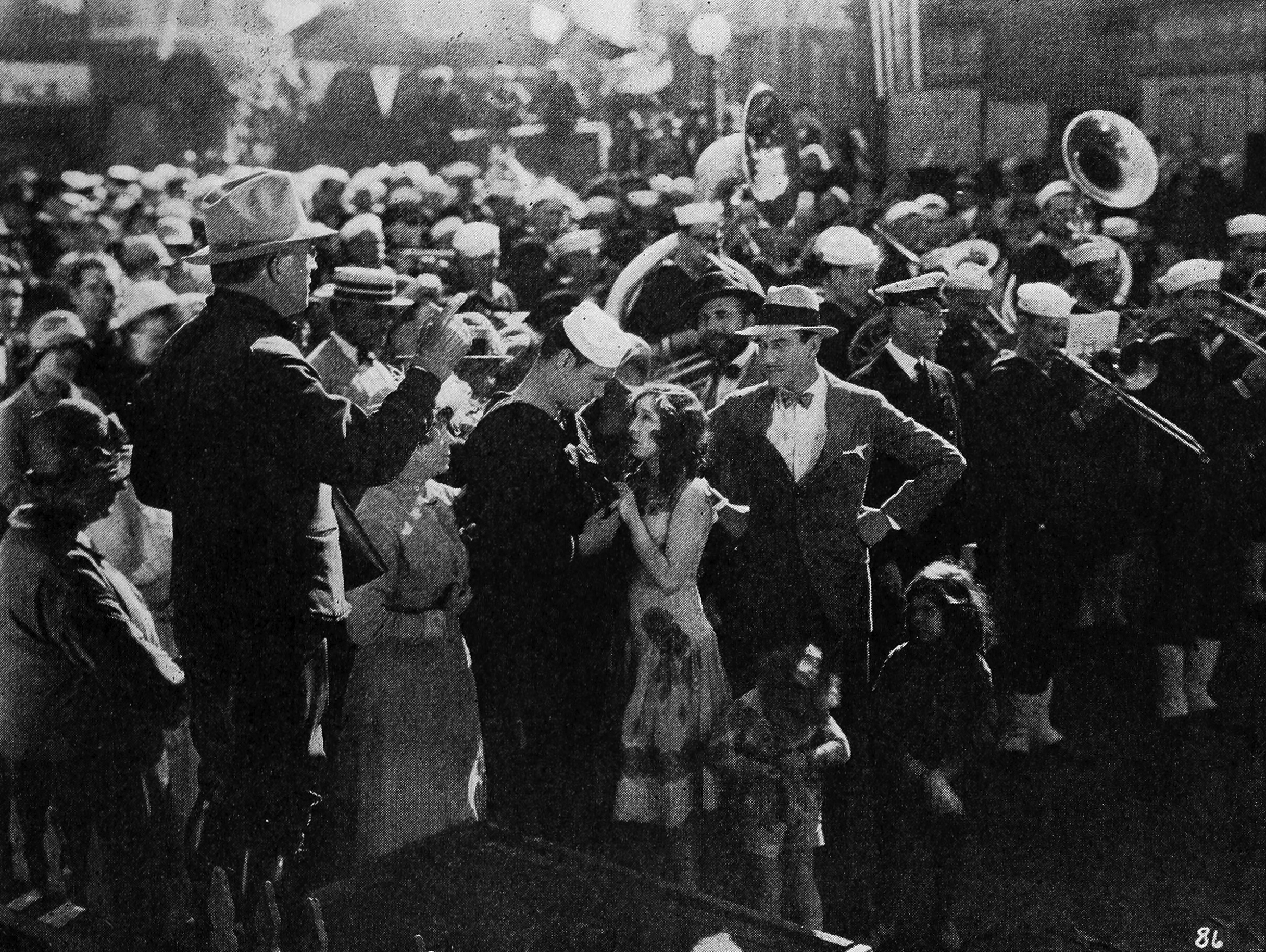
- Film still
- Directed by: J. Stuart Blackton
- Written by: Marian Constance Blackton (scenario)
- Based on: "The Flag Maker" (short story) by Jewel Spencer
- Produced by: George K. Spoor
- Starring: Bessie Love; Charles Ray
- Cinematography: Conrad Luperti; Marvin W. Spoor; William S. Adams
- Production company: Natural Vision Pictures
- Release date: 1927
- Running time: 6 reels
- Country: United States
- Language: Silent (English intertitles)

The American, a.k.a. The Flag Maker, is a lost 1927 American silent Western film directed by J. Stuart Blackton and starring Bessie Love and Charles Ray. It was based on the short story "The Flag Maker" by Jewel Spencer, and was produced by George K. Spoor through his company Natural Vision Pictures.

The film, made in the experimental widescreen process Natural Vision, developed by Spoor and P. John Berggren, was never released theatrically.

== Plot ==
A rich Turk Seref is released from an American prison after 20 years, with plans to exact revenge on the fiancee who had betrayed him.

== Cast ==
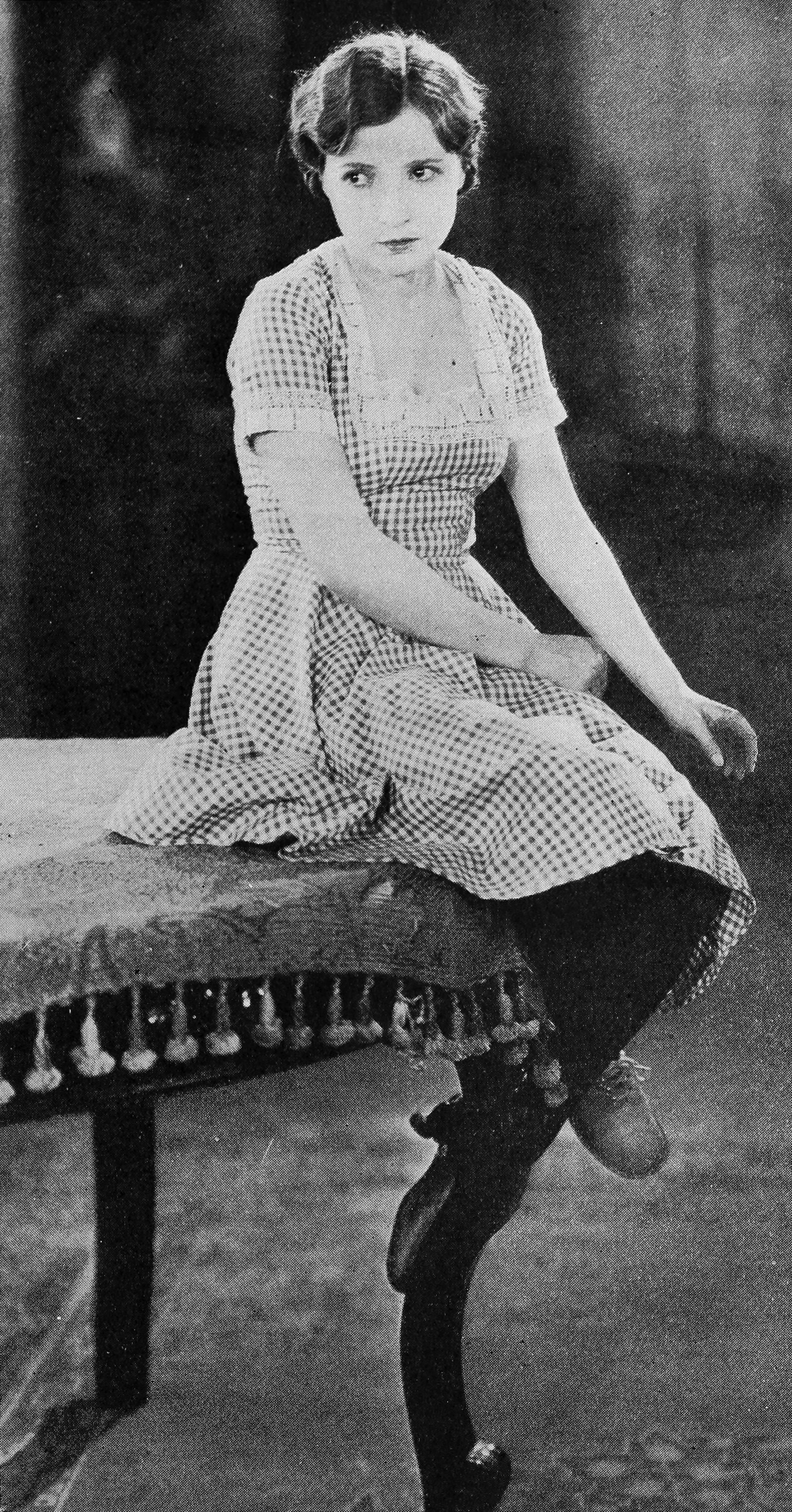
Bessie Love as Jane Wilton

- Bessie Love as Jane Wilton
- Charles Ray as Bill Smith
- Ward Crane
- Evelyn Selbie as Mrs. Williams
- Maurice Murphy as Bobby Williams
- Dick Brandon as Niles Wilton
- J. P. Lockney
- Banks Winter as the postmaster

== Production ==
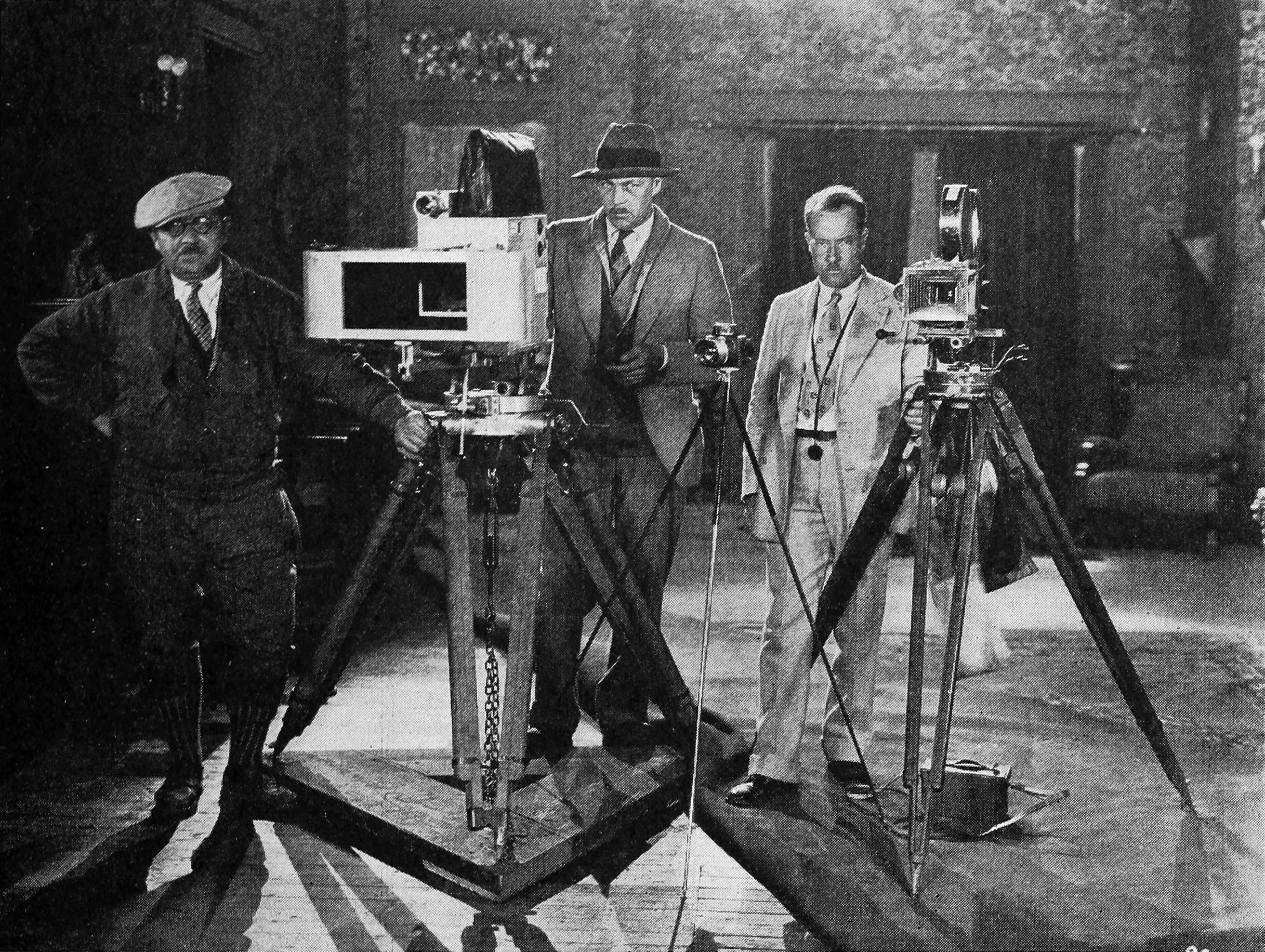
Conrad Luperti, J. Marvin Spoor, and William S. Adams with the Natural Vision camera

The Natural Vision process required the action to be filmed on two cameras: one for production and one for the dailies. The production camera was set back unusually far from the action, and subsequently filmed only wide shots and no close-ups.

== Canceled release ==
The film was slated for a March 1927 premiere at New York's Roxy Theatre, which was to have been equipped to show films in Natural Vision.

However, producer Spoor refused to release the film because it was "poorly made". Director Blackton protested, claiming that he had not been allowed to complete the picture, and had not been fully paid for his work.

== See also ==
- List of film formats
- Widescreen
