= Maria Louise Pool =

American writer

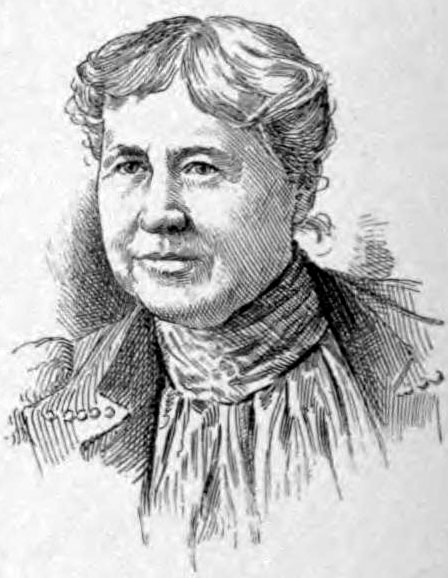
- Born: August 20, 1841; Rockland, Massachusetts
- Died: May 18, 1898 (aged 56)

Maria Louise Pool (August 20, 1841 – May 18, 1898) was an American writer.

== Early life and education ==
She was born in Rockland, Massachusetts to Elias Pool and Lydia Lane. She attended the public school of the town (then East Abington), and later taught school for two years.

== Career ==
She moved to Brooklyn, New York in 1870, where she first wrote for a Philadelphia paper and afterward for the New York Evening Post and the New York Tribune. Later she resided in Wrentham, Massachusetts. It was not until 1887 that she became widely known through her A Vacation in a Buggy.

Pool's grandfather, Daniel Lane Jr., was a justice of the peace and was known to have held court sessions in his Rockland home on Liberty Street. Pool's parents took ownership of the house in 1831 when Daniel Lane Jr. died. She would go on to build a house next door to this one where she would live with her companion Caroline M. Branson. Pool was known to prefer nature instead of society and was known to take long walks with her dog in the early hours of the morning.

As a child, Pool "never played with dolls or was interested in those games commonly like by the feminine child."

== Legacy ==
Her work was reviewed extensively, as by the New York Times, but has lapsed into obscurity. She was an influence upon the young Canadian-American writer Mary MacLane, who became friends with Pool's "literary companion" Caroline M. Branson (March 12, 1837 – January 10, 1918). Branson and MacLane lived together from 1902 to 1908 in the house Branson and Pool had lived in. Pool and Branson are buried alongside each other at Mount Pleasant Cemetery, Rockland, Massachusetts.

Pool is now regarded by many literary blogs as an obscure, LGBT figure of the 19th century.

== Works ==
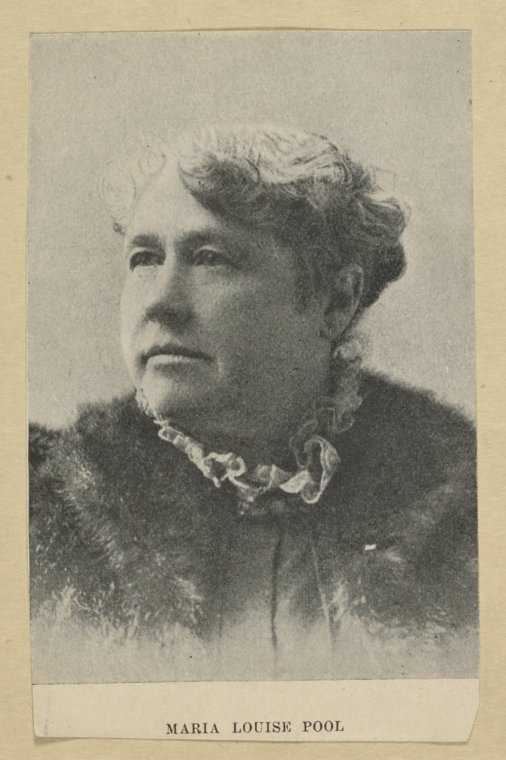
Wallach Division: Print Collection. Maria Louise Pool

Most of her literary work, which consists of sketches (chiefly of New England life) and social novels, appeared in the periodicals, and was later issued in book form. Among her 18 books were:

- A Vacation in a Buggy (1887), an early "road movie" account of a vacation by buggy by the author and her companion
- Tenting at Stony Beach (1888), an account of a vacation spent on the Massachusetts coast
- Dally (1891)
- Roweny in Boston (1892)
- Mrs. Keats Bradford (1892)
- Katherine North (1893)
- The Two Salomes (1893)
- Out of Step (1894)
- Against Human Nature (1895)
- In a Dike Shanty (1896)
- Mrs. Gerald (1896)
- In the First Person (1898)
- Friendship and Folly (1898)
- Boss and Other Dogs (1898)
- A Golden Sorrow (1898)
- Sand 'n' Bushes (1899)
- The Maloon Farm (1900, pub. posthumous)

== Sources ==
- "Pool, Maria Louise." American Authors 1600 – 1900. H. W. Wilson Company, NY 1938.
- Hale, Dr. Amand M. A Brief Sketch of the Life Of Maria Louise Pool. 1899 at http://www.burrows.com/poolbio.html J.R. Burrows & Co. Accessed 10 Dec 2007 .
- Wilson, J. G.; Fiske, J., eds. (1900). "Pool, Maria Louise" . Appletons' Cyclopædia of American Biography. New York: D. Appleton.
