= Men Who Have Made Love to Me =

1918 film by Arthur Berthelet

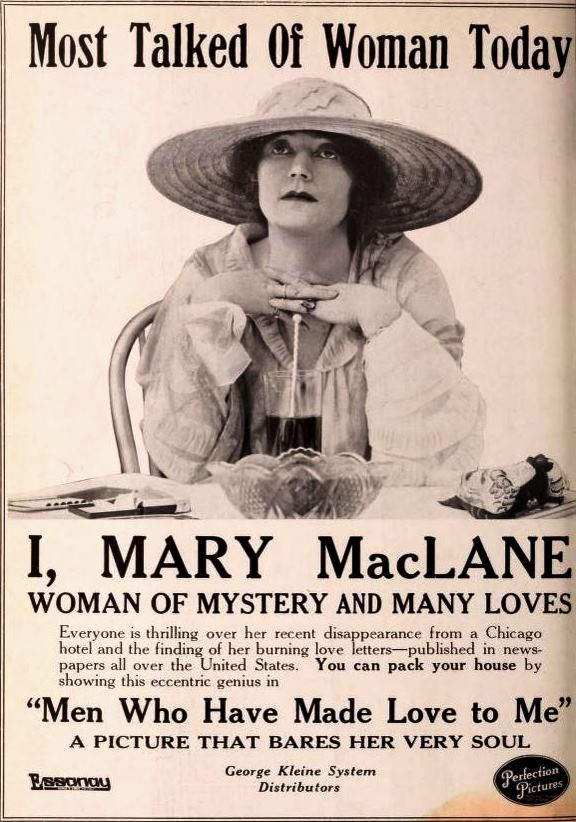
- Advertisement for film
- Directed by: Arthur Berthelet
- Written by: E. C. Lowe; Mary MacLane
- Based on: I, Mary MacLane by Mary McLane
- Produced by: George K. Spoor
- Starring: Mary MacLane; Ralph Graves; Paul Harvey
- Production company: Perfection Pictures / Essanay Film Manufacturing Company
- Distributed by: George Kleine System
- Release date: February 1, 1918
- Running time: 70 minutes (7 reels)
- Country: United States
- Language: Silent (English intertitles)

Men Who Have Made Love to Me is a 1918 American silent biographical film starring Mary MacLane, based on her book I, Mary MacLane (1917). It was directed by Arthur Berthelet and produced by early American filmmaker George K. Spoor.

== Plot ==
The story of six affairs of the heart, drawn from controversial feminist author Mary MacLane's 1910 syndicated article(s) by the same name, later published in book form in 1917. None of MacLane's affairs - with "the bank clerk," "the prize-fighter," "the husband of another," and so on - last, and in each of them MacLane emerges dominant. Re-enactments of the love affairs are interspersed with MacLane addressing the camera (while smoking), and talking contemplatively with her maid about the meaning and prospects of love.

== Cast ==
- Mary MacLane as herself
- Ralph Graves as The Callow Youth
- Paul Harvey as The Literary Man (as R. Paul Harvey)
- Cliff Worman as The Younger Son
- Alador Prince as The Prize Fighter
- Clarence Derwent as The Bank Clerk
- Fred Tiden as The Husband of Another

== Technical innovations ==
This film represents the earliest recorded breaking of the fourth wall in serious cinema, as the enigmatic author - who portrays herself - interrupts the vignettes onscreen to address the audience directly. This film is also the first in which writer, star, narrator, and subject are unified.

== Preservation status ==
It is not known whether the film currently survives, and Men Who Have Made Love to Me is now thought to be a lost film.
