= Modernist theatre =

Part of twentieth-century theatre

Modernist theatre was part of twentieth-century theatre relating to the art and philosophy of modernism.

== List of modernist plays ==
- Long Day's Journey into Night
- Waiting for Godot
- Who's Afraid of Virginia Woolf?
- The Caretaker
- A Streetcar Named Desire

== List of modernist playwrights ==
- Eugene O'Neill
- Samuel Beckett
- Edward Albee
- Harold Pinter
- Tennessee Williams
- Anton Chekhov
- Bertolt Brecht
- Henrik Ibsen

== See also ==
- Modernist film
- Modernist literature
- Theater of the Absurd
