= Mary MacLane =

American writer

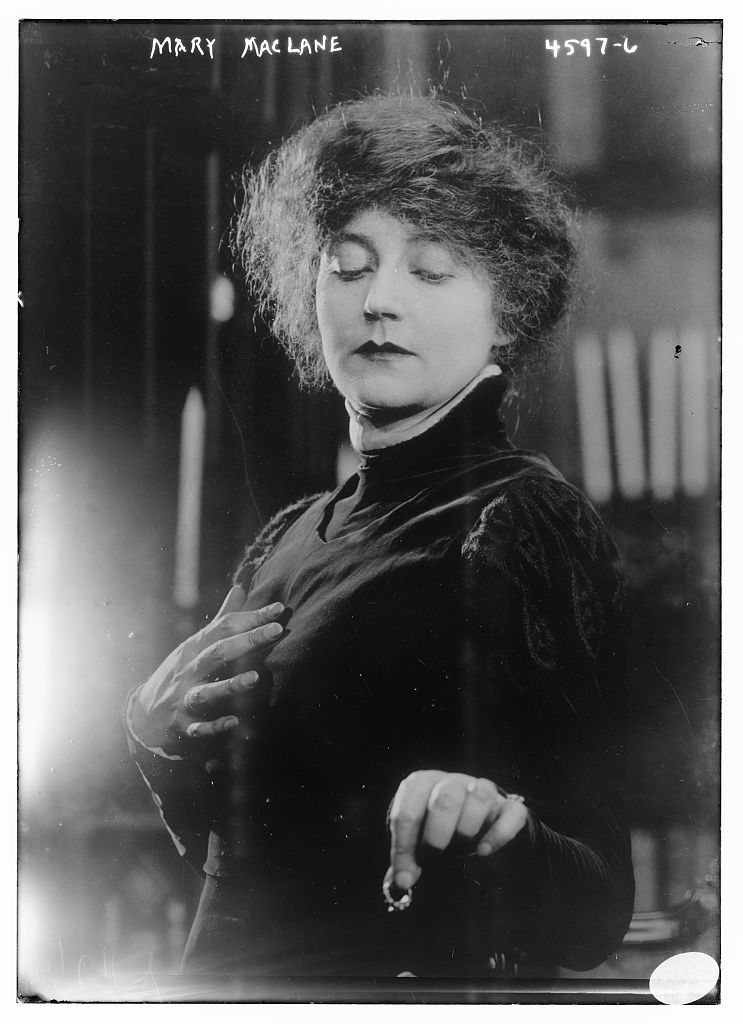
- MacLane in 1918
- Born: May 1, 1881; Winnipeg, Manitoba, Canada
- Died: August 6, 1929 (aged 48); Chicago, Illinois, United States
- Occupation: Writer

Mary MacLane (May 1, 1881 – c. August 6, 1929) was a controversial Canadian-born American writer whose frank memoirs helped usher in the confessional style of autobiographical writing. MacLane was known as the "Wild Woman of Butte".

MacLane was a popular author for her time, scandalizing the populace with her shocking bestselling first memoir and to a lesser extent her two following books. She was considered wild and uncontrollable, a reputation she nurtured, and was openly bisexual as well as a vocal feminist. In her writings, she compared herself to another frank young memoirist, Marie Bashkirtseff, who died a few years after MacLane was born, and H. L. Mencken called her "the Butte Bashkirtseff".

== Early life and family ==
MacLane was born in Winnipeg, Manitoba, Canada in 1881, but her family moved to the Red River area of Minnesota, settling in Fergus Falls, which her father helped develop. After his death in 1889, her mother remarried a family friend and lawyer, H. Gysbert Klenze. Soon after, the family moved to Montana, first settling in Great Falls and finally in Butte, where Klenze drained the family funds pursuing mining and other ventures. MacLane spent the remainder of her life in the United States. She began writing for her school paper in 1897.

== Writing and film ==
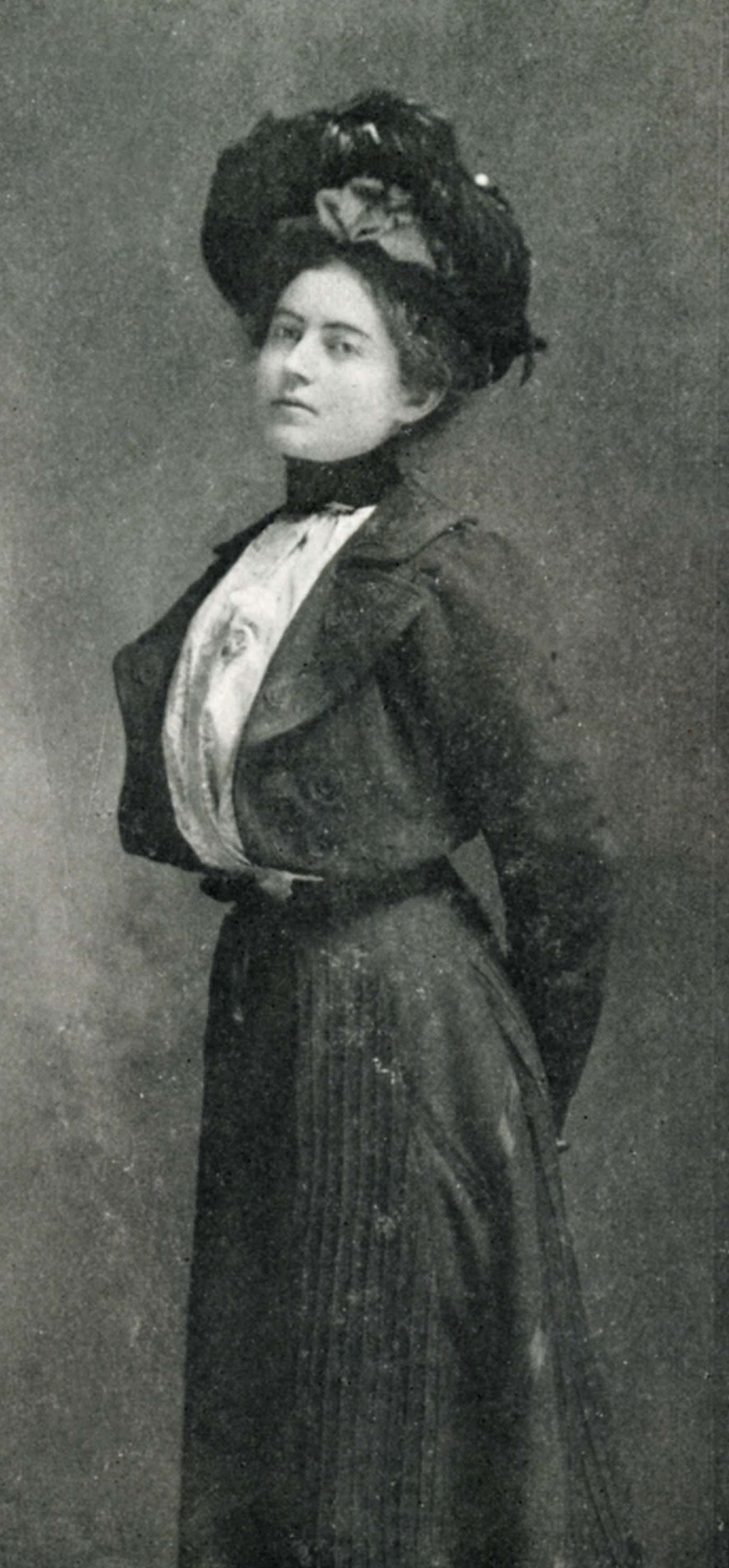
MacLane depicted on inside cover of a 1902 edition of The Story of Mary MacLane

In 1901, MacLane wrote her first book, which she originally titled I Await the Devil's Coming. Prior to the manuscript's printing the following year, MacLane's publisher, Herbert S. Stone & Company, altered the title to The Story of Mary MacLane. The book proved to be an immediate success, especially among young women, selling over 100,000 copies during its first month of release.

Her second book, My Friend Annabel Lee, was published by Stone in 1903. More experimental in style than her debut book, it was not as sensational, though MacLane was said to have made a fairly large amount of money.

Her final book, I, Mary Maclane: A Diary of Human Days was published by Frederick A. Stokes in 1917 and sold moderately well but may have been overshadowed by America's recent entry into World War I.

In 1917, she wrote and starred in the 90-minute autobiographical silent film titled Men Who Have Made Love to Me, for Essanay Studios. Produced by film pioneer George Kirke Spoor and based on MacLane's 1910 article of the same title for a Butte newspaper, it has been speculated to have been an extremely early, if not the earliest, sustained breaking of the fourth wall in cinema, with the writer-star directly addressing the audience. Though stills and some subtitles have survived, the film is now believed to be lost.

She was also known in her time for the mysterious Slanting Annie cocktail, which purportedly sent reporters and bartenders reeling. ("Whole City Guessing. Mary MacLane Nominates a New Poison. Bartenders up a Tree. Confess They Don't Know What a 'Slanting Annie' Is" was an admiring headline in The Montana Daily Record, May 9, 1902.) Published in thirty languages, her first and most famous work engendered several parodies.

== Influence ==
Among the numerous authors who referenced, parodied, or answered MacLane were Mark Twain, F. Scott Fitzgerald, Harriet Monroe, lawyer Clarence Darrow, Ring Lardner Jr., Sherwood Anderson and Daniel Clowes in Ice Haven. Gertrude Sanborn published an optimistic riposte to MacLane's 1917 I, Mary MacLane under the title I, Citizen of Eternity (1920).

== Personal life ==
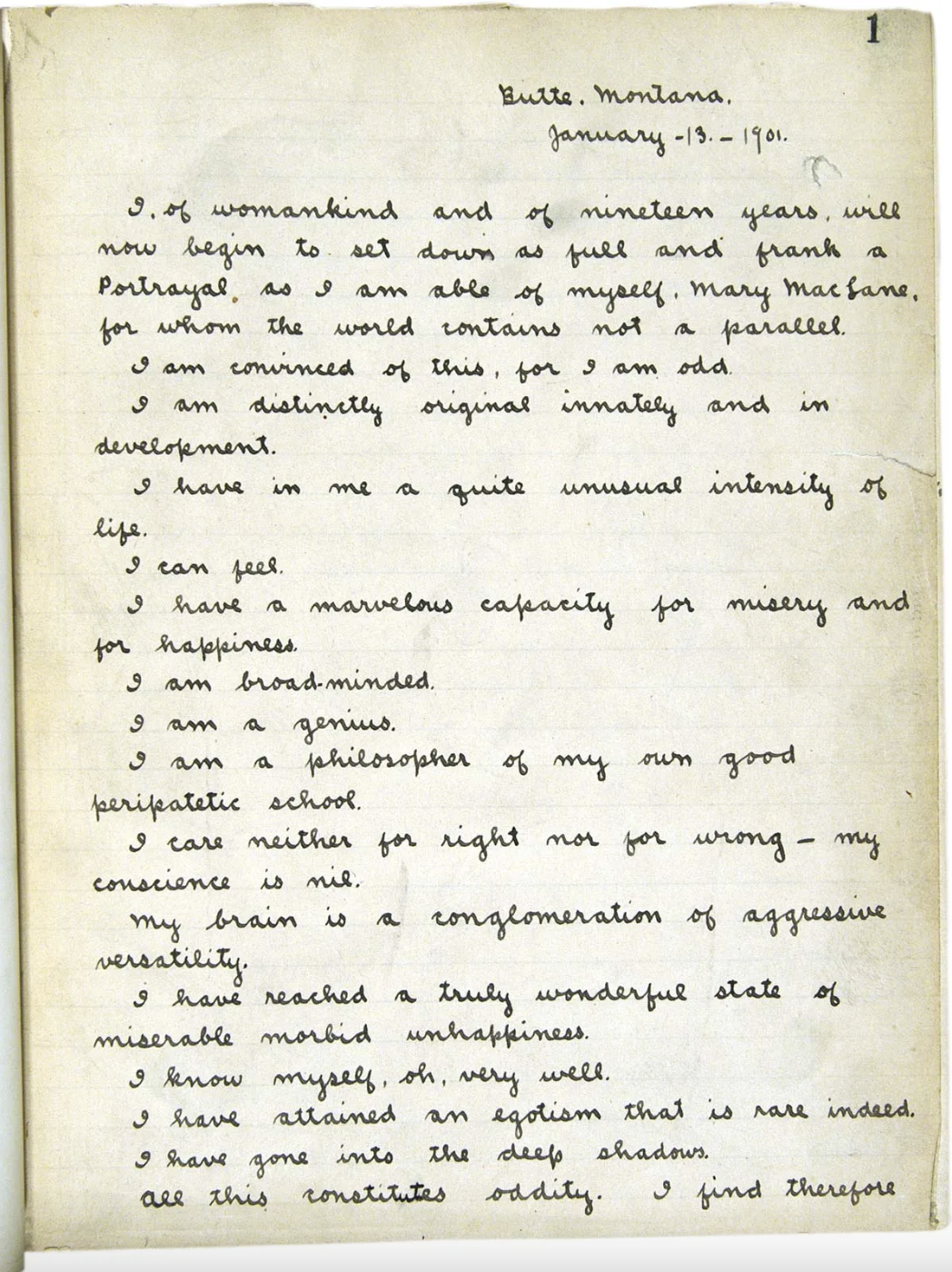
The first page of the original 1901 manuscript of I Await the Devil's Coming (renamed to The Story of Mary MacLane when published in 1902)

MacLane had always chafed, or felt "anxiety of place", at living in Butte, a mining city far from cultural centers, and used the money from her first book's sales to travel to Chicago and then throughout the East Coast. She lived in Rockland, Massachusetts, wintering in St. Augustine, Florida, from 1903 to 1908, then in Greenwich Village from 1908 to 1909, where she continued writing and, by her later published accounts, living a decadent and Bohemian existence. She was close friends with the feminist writer Inez Haynes Irwin, who is referenced in some of MacLane's 1910 writing in a Butte newspaper and who in turn mentioned MacLane in a 1911 magazine article.

For a period, she lived with her friend Caroline M. Branson, who had been the long-time companion of Maria Louise Pool until the latter's death in 1898. They lived in the Rockland house that Pool left to Branson. Mary Maclane also had a multi-decade friendship with Harriet Monroe.

MacLane died in Chicago in early August 1929, aged 48. She was less frequently discussed through the mid to late 20th century, and her prose remained out of print until late 1993, when The Story of Mary MacLane and some of her newspaper feature work was republished in Tender Darkness: A Mary MacLane Anthology.

== Contemporary collections and performances ==
In 2025, the first biography of MacLane - Mary MacLane: Herself, by Michael R. Brown - was published.

In 2014, the publisher of Tender Darkness (1993) published an expanded anthology titled Human Days: A Mary MacLane Reader (with a Foreword by Bojana Novakovic).

In 2011, Novakovic wrote and performed "The Story of Mary MacLane – By Herself" in Melbourne, Australia, which was subsequently staged in Sydney, Australia in 2012.

In the 2010s, MacLane's first book was translated into French, Danish, and Spanish. Reclam published a German edition of I Await the Devil's Coming in 2020, followed by 2021 editions of My Friend Annabel Lee and I, Mary MacLane.

== Works ==
=== Books ===
- The Story of Mary MacLane (1902).
- My Friend Annabel Lee (1903).
- The Story of Mary MacLane – Past and Present (1911).
- I, Mary MacLane: A Diary of Human Days (1917). Reissued in 2013.

=== Posthumous collections and editions ===
- The Story of Mary MacLane (1981), edited by Michael Yokum. Reprint of The Story of Mary MacLane – Past and Present.
- Tender Darkness: A Mary MacLane Anthology (1993), edited by Elisabeth Pruitt.
- The Story of Mary MacLane and Other Writings (1997), edited by Penelope Rosemont.
- I Await the Devil's Coming (2013). Reissue of The Story of Mary MacLane.
- Human Days: A Mary MacLane Reader (2014), edited by Michael R. Brown, with a foreword by Bojana Novakovic.

=== Selected articles and other short works ===
- "The Uninitiated" (October 1897), editorial.
- Untitled editorial on stoicism (January 1898).
- "Consider Thy Youth and Therein" (April 1899), editorial.
- "Charles Dickens – Best of Castle-Builders" (May 1899), graduation speech.
- "Mary MacLane at Coney Island" (1902).
- "Mary MacLane at Newport" (1902).
- "Mary MacLane in Little Old New York" (1902).
- "Mary MacLane on Wall Street" (1902).
- "On Marriage" (1902).
- "A Foreground and a Background" (1903).
- "He Loves Me" (1903).
- "Mary MacLane Discusses the 'Outward Seeming of Denver'" (1903).
- "The Second 'Story of Mary MacLane'" (1909).
- "The Autobiography of the Kid Primitive" (1910).
- "The Borrower of Two-Dollar Bills – and Other Women" (1910).
- "The Latter-Day Litany of Mary MacLane" (1910).
- "Mary MacLane Meets the Vampire on the Isle of Treacherous Delights" (1910).
- "Mary MacLane Soliloquizes on Scarlet Fever" (1910).
- "Mary MacLane Wants a Vote – For the Other Woman" (1910).
- "Men Who Have Made Love to Me" (1910).
- "A Waif of Destiny on the High Seas" (1910).
- "Mary MacLane Says –" (1911), article on fashion and feminism.
- "Woman and the Cigarette" (1911).
- "Mary MacLane on Marriage" (1917).
- "The Movies — and Me" (January 1918), published in Photoplay.
- "The Rebirth of Russia" (1918), review of Isaac Marcosson's account of the Russian Revolution.
- "Mencken's Latest Book" (1919), review of Prejudices: First Series by H. L. Mencken.

=== Film ===
- Men Who Have Made Love to Me (1918), writer and star.

== In popular culture ==
The 2020 novel Plain Bad Heroines features MacLane's life and work as a recurring interest for multiple characters in the book, which draws its title from a passage from MacLane's The Story of Mary MacLane.
