= Ann Kirk =

American film actress

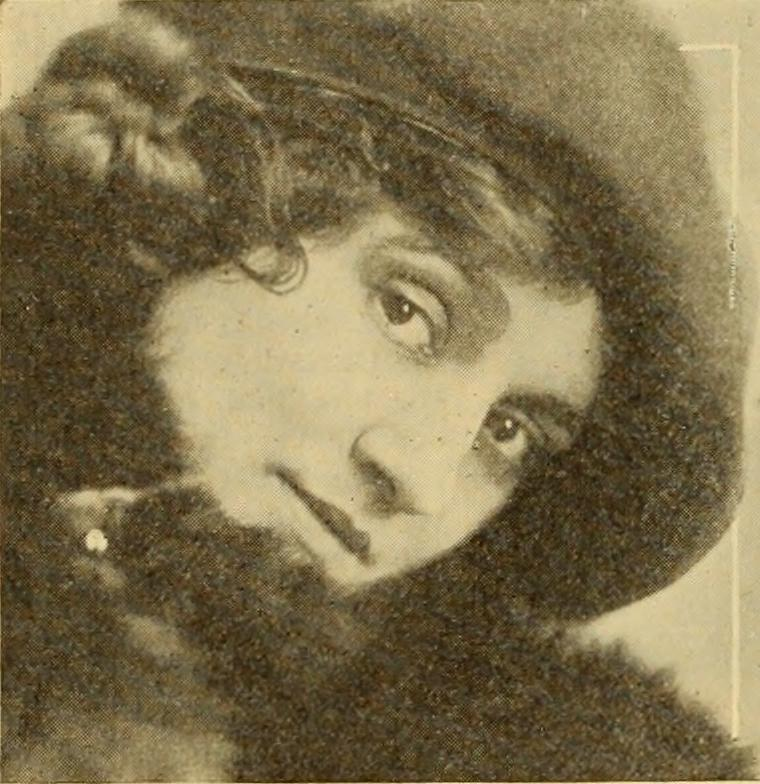
- Ann Kirk in 1916
- Born: Ann Kirk; 1894; New York City, U.S.
- Died: Unknown
- Occupation: Actress
- Years active: 1915–1916

Ann Kirk was an American film actress who had a small career in the 1910s during the silent film era.

== Filmography ==
- Tides That Meet (1915, Short) as Estelle Daley
- The Quitter (1915, Short) as Byrd Remington
- The Market Price of Love (1915, Short) as Mrs. Julia Rodney
- When My Lady Smiles (1915, Short) as Velda Browning
- A Traitor to Art (1916, Short) as Brenda Adams
- A Rose of Italy (1916, Short) as Lucia Lamberti
- Folly (1916, Short) as Morse's Adopted Daughter
