= Box set (theatre) =

Term in theatre

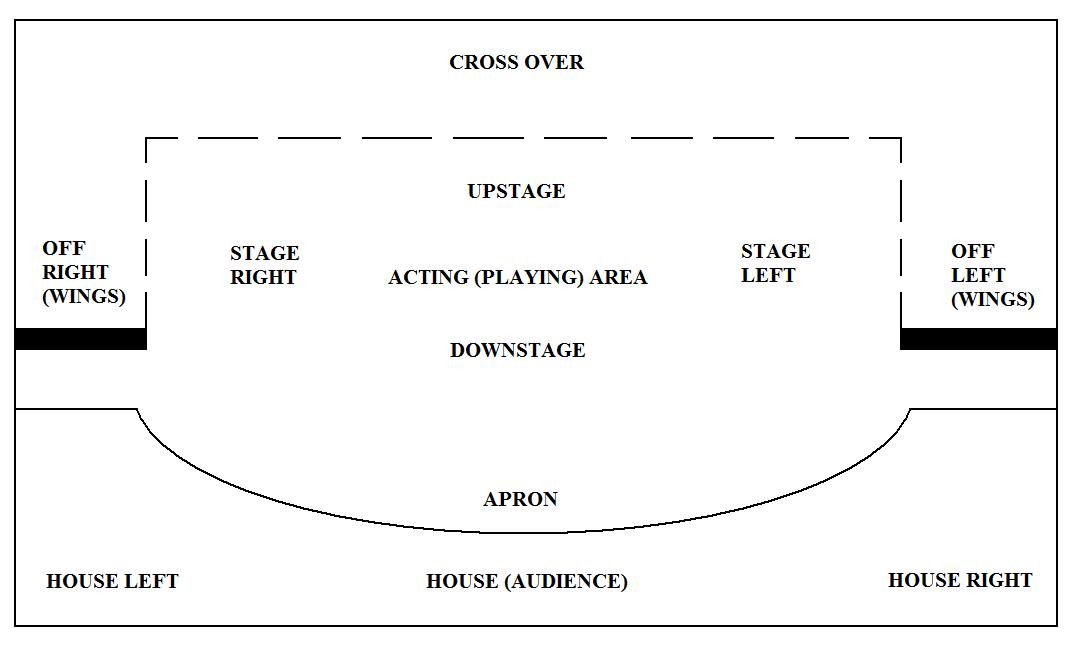
Areas of a typical (proscenium) stage

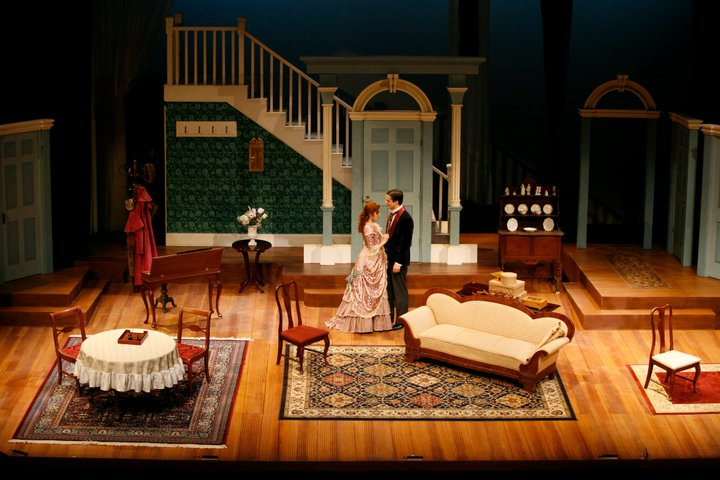
An Otterbein University Theatre & Dance production of A Doll's House

In theatre, a box set is a set with a proscenium arch stage and three walls. The proscenium opening is the fourth wall. Box sets create the illusion of an interior room on the stage, and are contrasted with earlier forms of sets which contained sliding flaps and gaps between set pieces.

Box sets are traditionally attributed to Elizabeth Vestris with the Victorian farce London Assurance by Dion Boucicault. But evidence suggests the first description of the box set was by Paolo Landriani in 1818, with his description of a scena parapettata.

They were popularized by Marie Wilton at the Prince of Wales's Royal Theatre. They later became a feature of realist theatre, and an example of the "fourth wall removed" principle that characterized the work of noted realists such as Henrik Ibsen's A Doll's House, George Bernard Shaw's Pygmalion, and Anton Chekhov's The Seagull.

In the play style of realism, the box set of the stage was a room with either a plain black backdrop or three walls. The fourth wall was invisible, separating the characters from the audience, and the ceiling was tilted down at the far end of the stage and up toward the audience. Doors slammed instead of swinging when being shut, as in reality.
