= Fourth wall =

Separation of performers and audience

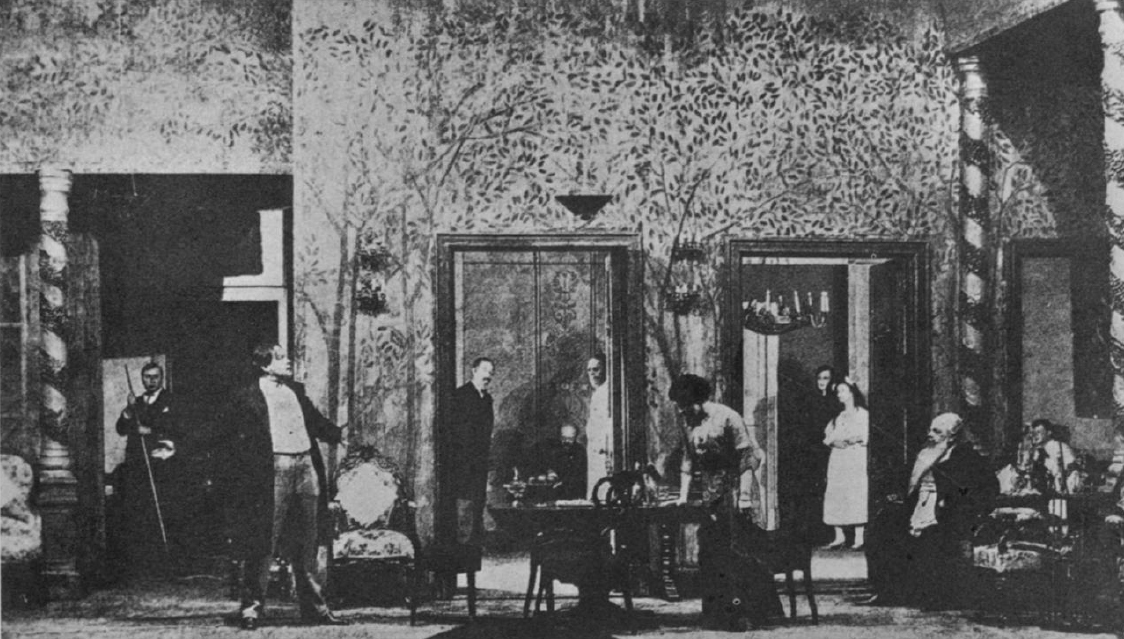
In Stanislavski's production of The Cherry Orchard (Moscow Art Theatre, 1904), a three-dimensional box set gives the illusion of a real room. The actors act as if unaware of the audience, separated by an invisible "fourth wall", defined by the proscenium arch.

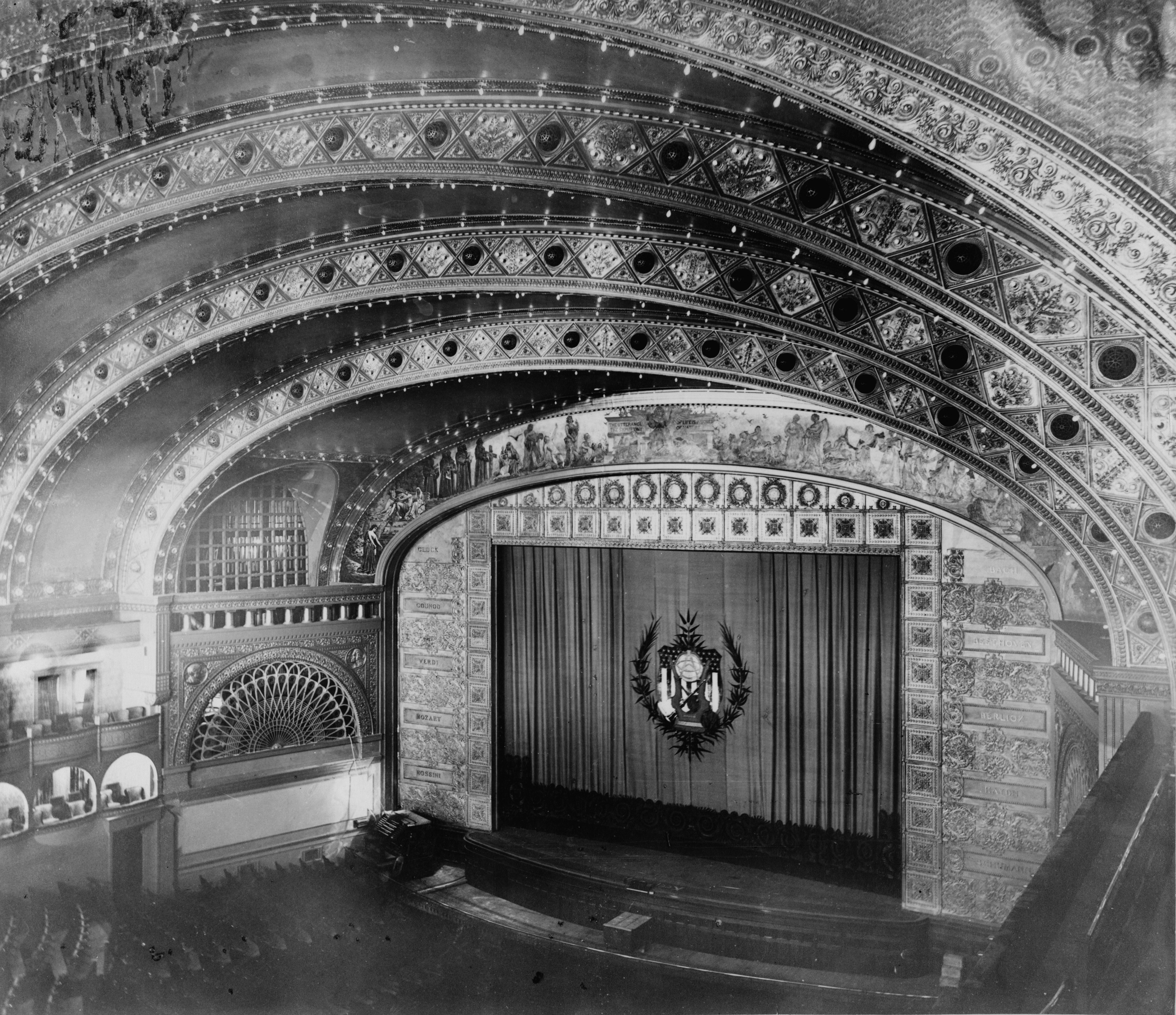
The proscenium arch of the theater in the Auditorium Building, Chicago. It is the frame decorated with square tiles that form the vertical rectangle separating the stage (mostly behind the lowered curtain) from the auditorium (the area with seats).

The fourth wall is a common convention in narrative drama in which a metaphorical, invisible, or imaginary wall separates performers (actors, dancers, singers, etc.) from the audience, so that the audience sees through this "wall" into the performed narrative, but the performers behave as if they cannot see the audience in turn. The metaphor has also been extended outside of the theater, for instance to the typical boundary between character and audience in films, video games, or television programs, in which characters behave as if they are unaware of the camera. From the 16th century onward, the rise of illusionism in staging practices—culminating in the realism and naturalism of the theatre of the 19th century—led to the development of the fourth wall concept.

The metaphor of a wall relates to the arrangement of elements on stage, where scenes are often set in a room with three of its walls depicted (or visually implied), forming what is known as a box set, with its "fourth" wall non-existent or open to the audience. As a result, from the seating area or auditorium, the audience can see directly and clearly into the room. Thus, the fourth wall is an imagined theatrical convention rather than a tangible feature of set design. Actors ignore the audience, focus entirely on the fictional world of the play, and maintain immersion in a state that theater practitioner Konstantin Stanislavski called "public solitude" —the ability to behave privately while being observed, or to be "alone in public." This convention applies regardless of the physical set, theatre building, or actors' proximity to the audience. In practice, actors often respond subtly to audience reactions, adjusting timing—particularly for comedic moments—to ensure lines are heard clearly despite laughter.

== Breaking the fourth wall ==
Breaking the fourth wall in a narrative, particularly in drama, is the action of characters violating the convention of the fourth wall, for instance when performers in a play speak directly to or even interact with the audience, when movie or television characters speak directly into the camera, when protagonists in a novel acknowledge the artificiality of the story they are in, or generally whenever fictional characters openly refer to themselves as such. Such moments, which draw attention to the lack of separation between character and audience or that remind the audience that the fourth wall does not really exist, are a form of metatheatre or metafiction.

A similar metareference occurs when actors in television or film make silent eye contact with the camera, momentarily suspending the usual convention of ignoring the camera. Such techniques are employed for a variety of storytelling reasons such as for humor, shock, audience engagement, philosophical or thematic reasons, etc. The phrase "breaking the fourth wall" is now used broadly in reference to similar moments across various media, including video games and books.

== History ==
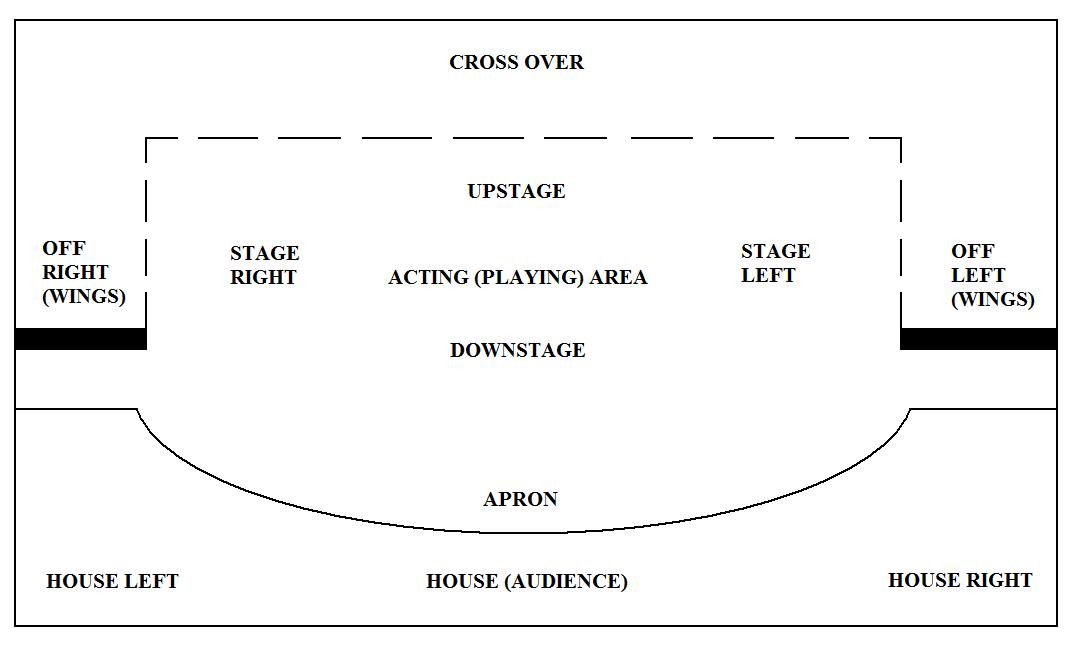
Typical stage, fourth wall being the house

The acceptance of the fourth wall's transparency is part of the suspension of disbelief that allows audiences to experience fictional events as real. The concept is often attributed to philosopher, critic and dramatist Denis Diderot, who wrote in 1758 that actors and writers should "imagine a huge wall across the front of the stage, separating you from the audience, and behave exactly as if the curtain had never risen". In 1987, critic Vincent Canby described the fourth wall as "that invisible scrim that forever separates the audience from the stage."

Diderot's "un grand mur" became "the fourth wall" to Leigh Hunt when in 1807 referring to Mr. Bannister, wrote:

"No actor enters so well into the spirit of his audience as well as his author, for he engages your attention immediately by seeming to care nothing about you; the stage appears to be his own room, of which the audience compose the fourth wall."

In the late 19th century, the concept was also referred to as "fourth wall theory" possibly arising from an article by Henry Irving in February 1879 explaining a stage device used in a production of Hamlet:

"It should never be forgotten that the stage has four walls, though the fourth is only theoretical, and I believe it to be in every sense advantageous that the audience should be left to imagine, if they like, either that the pictures are on this fourth wall, or that Hamlet is painting them from his imagination. Whichever view be adopted, the result then is that the mind is concentrated upon the impressive language of the poet, instead of being diverted from it by some mechanical device."

The first known use of "fourth wall theory" follows later that month in a comment on that article in the British periodical Truth.

=== Theatre ===
The fourth wall was not a recognized concept in much of early dramatic history. Classical plays from ancient Greece through the Renaissance frequently included direct addresses to the audience, such as asides and soliloquies.

The fourth wall became an established convention with the rise of modern realistic theater, which has led some artists to draw direct attention to it for dramatic or comic effect when a boundary is "broken" when an actor or character addresses the audience directly. Breaking the fourth wall is especially common in pantomime and children's theater where—for example, a character might ask the children for help, as when Peter Pan appeals to the audience to applaud in an effort to revive the fading Tinker Bell ("If you believe in fairies, clap your hands!").

=== Cinema ===
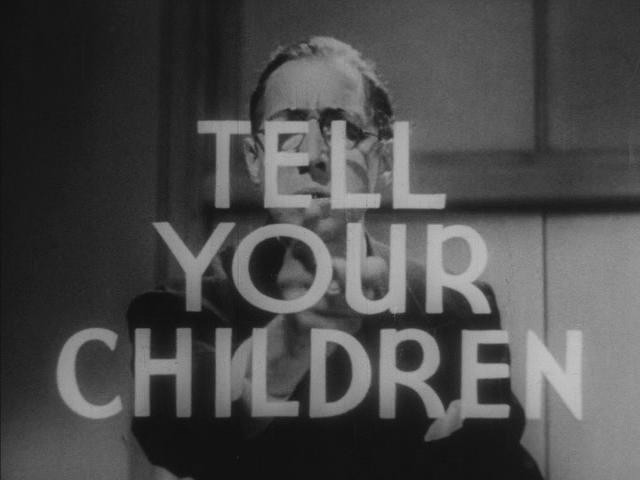
Josef Forte, as Dr. Alfred Carroll, breaks the fourth wall to warn viewers at the end of Reefer Madness, 1936.

One of the earliest recorded breakings of the fourth wall in serious cinema was in Mary MacLane's 1918 silent film Men Who Have Made Love to Me, in which the enigmatic author – who portrays herself – interrupts the vignettes onscreen to address the audience directly.

Oliver Hardy often broke the fourth wall in his films with Stan Laurel, when he would stare directly at the camera to seek sympathy from viewers. Groucho Marx spoke directly to the audience in Animal Crackers (1930), and Horse Feathers (1932), in the latter film advising them to "go out to the lobby" during Chico Marx's piano interlude. Comedy films by Mel Brooks, Monty Python, and Zucker, Abrahams and Zucker frequently broke the fourth wall, such that with these films "the fourth wall is so flimsy and so frequently shattered that it might as well not exist", according to The A.V. Club.

Characters in theatrical animated cartoons, particularly Bugs Bunny and other characters in Warner Bros.' Looney Tunes and Merrie Melodies shorts, regularly broke the fourth wall. Several of these cartoons – such as the Merrie Melodies shorts Daffy Duck and Egghead (1938) and Thugs with Dirty Mugs (1939), both directed by Tex Avery – also feature gags involving characters meant to represent theater audience members (sometimes represented onscreen via silhouette, as if they had stepped in front of the movie theater projector).

Woody Allen broke the fourth wall repeatedly in his film Annie Hall (1977), as he explained, "because I felt many of the people in the audience had the same feelings and the same problems. I wanted to talk to them directly and confront them." His 1985 film The Purple Rose of Cairo features the breaking of the fourth wall as a central plot point. In Ferris Bueller's Day Off (1986), Ferris (Matthew Broderick) regularly breaks the fourth wall, including during a short post-credits scene where he peeks around a corner, is surprised to see that the audience is still there, and shoos them away by telling them to go home.

Jerry Lewis wrote in his 1971 book The Total Filmmaker, "Some film-makers believe you should never have an actor look directly into the camera. They maintain it makes the audience uneasy, and interrupts the screen story. I think that is nonsense, and usually I have my actors, in a single, look direct into the camera at least once in a film, if a point is to be served." Martin and Lewis look directly at the audience in You're Never Too Young (1955), and Lewis and co-star Stella Stevens each look directly into the camera several times in The Nutty Professor (1963), and Lewis' character holds a pantomime conversation with the audience in The Disorderly Orderly (1964). The final scene of The Patsy (1964) is famous for revealing to the audience the movie as a movie, and Lewis as actor/director.

One of the most surprising dramatic examples occurs at the very end of the 1971 John Schlesinger film, Sunday Bloody Sunday, when the main character, played by Peter Finch, directly addresses the audience, there being nothing in the characterization or narrative up to that point to indicate that this may be a featured device.

The 2022 film Persuasion was criticized for its modernization take on the classic 1817 Jane Austen novel by having the main protagonist Anne Elliot (played by Dakota Johnson) constantly breaking the fourth wall by interacting with the audience.

Select theatrical screenings of Francis Ford Coppola's 2024 science fiction epic Megalopolis, including its private industry screenings and world premiere at the 2024 Cannes Film Festival, had a person walk on stage in front of the projection screen and address the protagonist, Cesar, who seemingly breaks the fourth wall by replying in real time.

=== Television ===
On television, the fourth wall has broken throughout the history of the medium.

Fourth wall breakage is common in comedy, and is frequently used in animated television shows, adapting its use in theatrical cartoons to television in programs such as Hanna-Barbera's The Yogi Bear Show. It is also prominently used in the live-action 1960s sketch comedy of Monty Python's Flying Circus, which the troupe also brought to their feature films. With animated characters, this typically involves pretending that the characters are played by real actors, rather than acknowledging their true nature as animated drawings. George Burns regularly broke the fourth wall on The George Burns and Gracie Allen Show (1950).

Another convention often discussed as a form of breaking the fourth wall is seen in mockumentary sitcoms, including The Office. In such shows, characters may speak directly to the documentary camera during interview sequences, or acknowledge the presence of an unseen interviewer. However, because the camera crew and interview situation may be part of the fictional documentary frame, looking at or speaking to the camera does not always function as a conventional break from the fiction. Characters in The Office are removed from the rest of the group to speak and reflect on their experiences, while the interviewer remains hidden or only indirectly acknowledged. This technique parodies documentary conventions, heightens the comic tone, and makes the camera an active presence rather than a passive observer.

Another approach to breaking the fourth wall is through a central narrator character who is part of the show's events, but at times speaks directly to the audience. For example, Francis Urquhart in the British TV drama series House of Cards, To Play the King and The Final Cut addresses the audience several times during each episode, giving the viewer comments on his own actions on the show. The same technique is also used, though less frequently, in the American adaptation of House of Cards by main character Frank Underwood.

The Netflix series A Series of Unfortunate Events, based on Daniel Handler's book series of the same name, incorporates some of the narrative elements from the books by having Lemony Snicket as a narrator character (played by Patrick Warburton) speaking directly to the television viewer that frequently breaks the fourth wall to explain various literary wordplay in a manner similar to the book's narration. The protagonist of Fleabag also frequently uses the technique to provide exposition, internal monologues, and a running commentary to the audience.

Every episode of the sitcom Saved by the Bell breaks the fourth wall during the introduction by the character Zack Morris. Most episodes have several other fourth wall breaks. This is similar to how The Fresh Prince of Bel-Air, Clarissa Explains It All and Malcolm in the Middle use fourth wall breaks to set up stories or have characters comment on situations. Showtime's Shameless has a main character breaking the fourth wall at every episode's beginning to deliberately criticize and threaten the viewers to emphasize the morally deficient plots and characters likely in an deliberate attempt to turn away any naïve viewers to maintain the exclusiveness of the series, only to add to its popularity.

Furthermore, breaking the fourth wall can also be used in meta-referencing in order to draw attention to or invite reflection about a specific in-universe issue. An example of this is in the first episode of the final season of the show Attack on Titan, where a newly introduced character, Falco Grice, starts to hallucinate about events that took place in the last 3 seasons. This literary device utilizes self-referencing to trigger media-awareness in the recipient, used to signpost the drastic shift in perspective from the Eldian to the Marleyan side, and can be employed in all sorts of media.

The use of breaking the fourth wall in television has sometimes been unintentional. In the Doctor Who episode "The Caves of Androzani", the character of Morgus looks directly at the camera when thinking aloud. This was due to actor John Normington misunderstanding a stage direction, but the episode's director, Graeme Harper, felt that this helped increase dramatic tension, and decided not to reshoot the scenes.

Interactive children's show characters also commonly break the fourth wall to "help" the audience with the episodes of the shows.

=== Video games ===
Given their interactive nature, nearly all video games break the fourth wall by asking for the player's participation and having user interface elements on the screen (such as explanations of the game's controls) that address the player rather than their character. Methods of fourth wall breaking within the narrative include having the character face the direction of the player/screen, having a self-aware character that recognizes that they are in a video game, or having secret or bonus content set outside the game's narrative that can either extend the game world (such as with the use of false documents) or provide "behind the scenes" type content. Such cases typically create a video game that includes a metafiction narrative, commonly presently characters in the game incorporating knowledge they are in a video game.

For example, in Doki Doki Literature Club!, one of the characters named Monika is aware that she is a part of a video game, and at the end, communicates with the player. To progress further in the story, the player must remove the monika.chr file (an action they take outside of the game, i.e. through the computer's file system). The plot of the game OneShot revolves around the fictional universe of the game being a simulation running on the player's computer, with certain characters being aware of this fact and sometimes communicating directly with the player. In other cases of metafictional video games, the game alters the player's expectation of how the game should behave, which may make the player question if their own game system is at fault, helping to increase the immersion of the game.

Since video games are inherently much more interactive than traditional films and literature, defining what truly breaks the fourth wall in the video game medium becomes difficult. Steven Conway, writing for Gamasutra, suggests that in video games, many purported examples of breaking the fourth wall are actually better understood as relocations of the fourth wall or expansions of the "magic circle" (the fictional game world) to encompass the player. This is in contrast to traditional fourth wall breaks, which break the audience's illusion or suspension of disbelief, by acknowledging them directly. Conway argues that this expansion of the magic circle in video games actually serves to more fully immerse a player into the fictional world rather than take the viewer out of the fictional world, as is more common in traditional fourth wall breaks. An example of this expansion of the magic circle can be found in the game Evidence: The Last Ritual, in which the player receives an in-game email at their real-life email address and must visit out-of-game websites to solve some of the puzzles in the game. Other games may expand the magic circle to include the game's hardware. For example, X-Men for the Mega Drive/Genesis requires players to reset their game console at a certain point to reset the X-Men's in-game Hazard Room, while Metal Gear Solid asks the player to put the DualShock controller on their neck to simulate a back massage being given in-game.

Other examples include the idle animation of Sonic the Hedgehog in his games where the on-screen character would look to the player and tap his foot impatiently if left alone for a while, a character in Super Paper Mario referring to the player as 'the great being' and one level of Max Payne has the eponymous character come to the realization he and other characters are in a video game and narrates what the player sees as part of the UI. Eternal Darkness, which included a sanity meter, would simulate various common computer glitches to the player as the sanity meter drained, including the Blue Screen of Death. The Stanley Parable is also a well-known example of this, as the narrator from the game constantly tries to reason with the player, even going so far as to beg the player to switch off the game at one point.

=== Literature ===
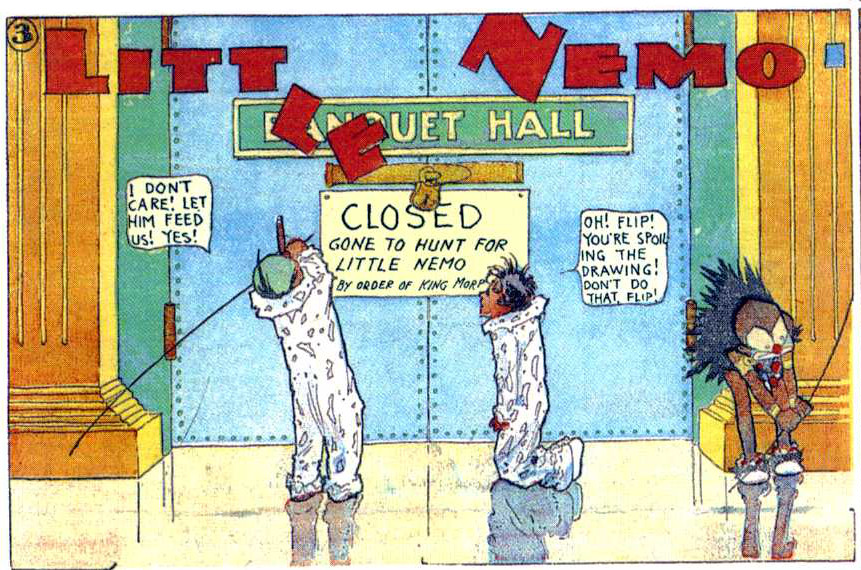
Flip, Nemo, and Impie breaking the fourth wall by breaking apart the panel's outlines and detaching the letters of the title within their comic book Little Nemo

The method of breaking the fourth wall in literature is a metalepsis (the transgression of narrative levels), which is a technique often used in metafiction. The metafiction genre occurs when a character within a literary work acknowledges the reality that they are in fact a fictitious being. The use of the fourth wall in literature can be traced back as far as The Canterbury Tales and Don Quixote. Northanger Abbey is a late modern era example.

It was popularized in the early 20th century during the postmodern literary movement. Artists like Virginia Woolf in To the Lighthouse (1927) and Kurt Vonnegut in Breakfast of Champions (1973) used the genre to question the accepted knowledge and sources of the culture. The use of metafiction or breaking the fourth wall in literature varies from that on stage in that the experience is not communal but personal to the reader and develops a self-consciousness within the character/reader relationship that works to build trust and expand thought. This does not involve an acknowledgment of a character's fictive nature. Breaking the fourth wall in literature is not always metafiction.

Modern examples of breaking the fourth wall include Ada Palmer's Terra Ignota, William Goldman's The Princess Bride, Marvel Comics' Deadpool, and DC Comics' Superboy-Prime.

== See also ==
- Aside
- Audience participation
- Breaking character
- Kubrick stare
- List of narrative techniques
- Meta-reference
