= The View from Pompey's Head (film) =

1955 American drama film written and directed by Philip Dunne

- Theatrical release poster
- Directed by: Philip Dunne
- Screenplay by: Philip Dunne
- Based on: The View from Pompey's Head by Hamilton Basso
- Produced by: Philip Dunne
- Starring: Richard Egan; Dana Wynter; Cameron Mitchell; Sidney Blackmer; Marjorie Rambeau; Dorothy Patrick
- Cinematography: Joseph MacDonald
- Edited by: Robert L. Simpson
- Music by: Elmer Bernstein
- Production company: 20th Century Fox
- Distributed by: 20th Century Fox
- Release date: November 4, 1955
- Running time: 97 minutes
- Country: United States
- Language: English

The View from Pompey's Head is a 1955 American drama film, written and directed by Philip Dunne and based on the 1954 novel The View from Pompey's Head by Hamilton Basso. The film stars Richard Egan, Dana Wynter, Cameron Mitchell, Sidney Blackmer, Marjorie Rambeau and Dorothy Patrick. The film was released on November 4, 1955, by 20th Century Fox.

== Cast ==
- Richard Egan as Anson 'Sonny' Page
- Dana Wynter as Dinah Blackford Higgins
- Cameron Mitchell as Michael "Mickey" / "Mico" Higgins
- Sidney Blackmer as Garvin Wales
- Marjorie Rambeau as Lucy Devereaux Wales
- Dorothy Patrick as Meg Page
- Rosemarie Bowe as Kit Robbins Garrick
- Jerry Paris as Ian Garrick
- Ruby Goodwin as Esther
- Pamela Stufflebeam as Julia Higgins
- Evelyn Rudie as Cecily Higgins
- Howard Wendell as John Duncan
- Dayton Lummis as Charles Barlowe

== Production ==
=== Original Novel ===
The novel, set in a South Carolina town called Pompey's Head, took Basso several years to write. Reviews were, on the whole, superb. The New York Times praised it as a book of "controlled art and distinction".

The book became a best seller. A copy of it was on the bedside of Serge Rubinstein when he was discovered murdered.

=== Film Development ===
Film rights were purchased by 20th Century Fox in November 1954 for a reported $100,000. Fox head of production Darryl F. Zanuck said, "It's a terrible title, but the rave notices of the book and the distinguished manner of writing make this much more than an average suspense story." Julian Blaustein was assigned to produce, Phillip Dunne to write and direct. Zanuck wanted Gregory Peck to star.

Blaustein resigned from Fox in December. Dunne took over as producer.

Peck did not end up appearing in the film. Fox tried to borrow Glenn Ford, but he was under contract to MGM, which would not loan him out. Dunne ended up casting studio star Richard Egan. Because Egan was busy on Seven Cities of Gold filming on Head was pushed back to June 2.

"I wrote it for Bill Holden and Audrey Hepburn", said Dunne later. "Both were busy elsewhere. I had to make it with Richard Egan and Dana Wynter, who are just as good actors but lacked sex appeal. Making movies is a matter of making compromises."

The movie was set in coastal South Carolina and was shot mostly in coastal Georgia, which in the 1950s was still a rarely used location for filmmakers.
