= Mister Romeo (1927) =

1927 stage comedy on Broadway

Mister Romeo is a 1927 stage comedy play by Harry Wagstaff Gribble and Wallace Manheimer, directed by Henry Lehrman or Edward Nelson, produced by Murray Phillips and featuring J. C. Nugent. It ran at Wallack's Theatre.

It is a story about a brow-beaten wife who take vengeance on her filandering husband.

It was made into a Fox Film movie Chicken A La King.
