= The Greater Woman =

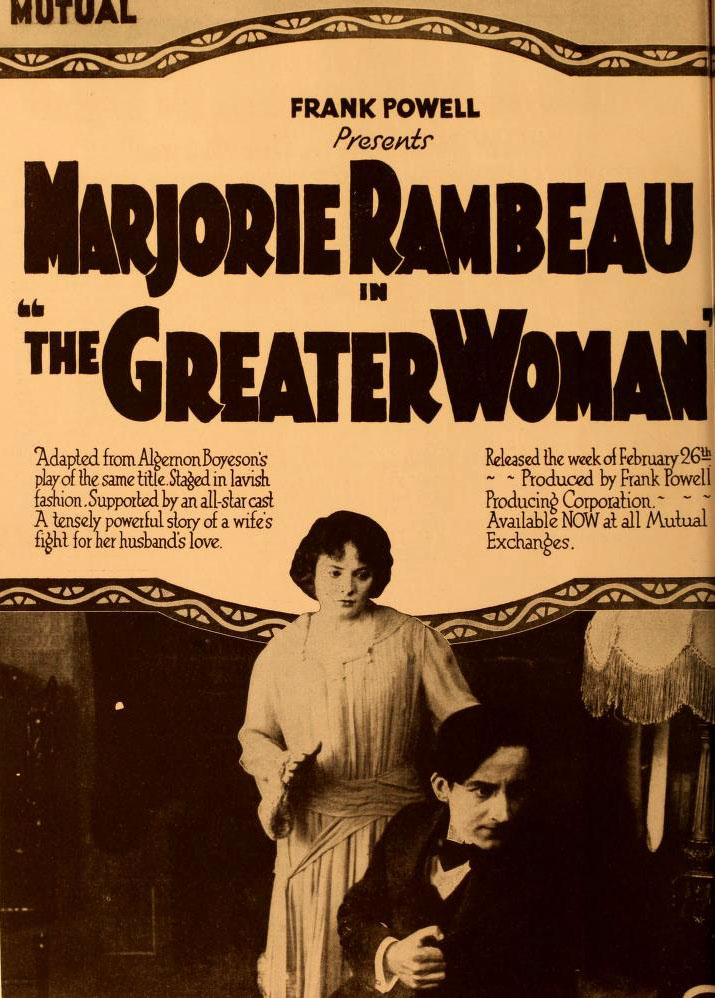
- Directed by: Frank Powell
- Written by: Clara Beranger (scenario)
- Based on: The Greater Woman by Algernon Boyeson
- Produced by: Frank Powell
- Starring: Marjorie Rambeau
- Cinematography: William Wagner
- Distributed by: Mutual Film
- Release date: February 26, 1917
- Running time: 5 reels
- Country: United States
- Languages: Silent film English intertitles

The Greater Woman is a 1917 silent film drama starring Broadway actress Marjorie Rambeau in her first motion picture beginning a 40-year screen career. Mutual Film released the film and Frank Powell directed.

== Cast ==
- Marjorie Rambeau - Auriole Praed
- Aubrey Beattie - Leo Bannister
- Hassan Mussalli - Otto Bettany
- Sara Haidez - Ida Angley
- Frank A. Ford - Eustace Praed
- Josephine Park - Fanny Praed
- Margaret Grey - ?
- H. H. Pattee - ?
- Louis Stern - ?

== Preservation ==
With no prints of The Greater Woman located in any film archives, it is considered a lost film.
