= La Gioconda (play) =

1899 play written by Gabriele D'Annunzio

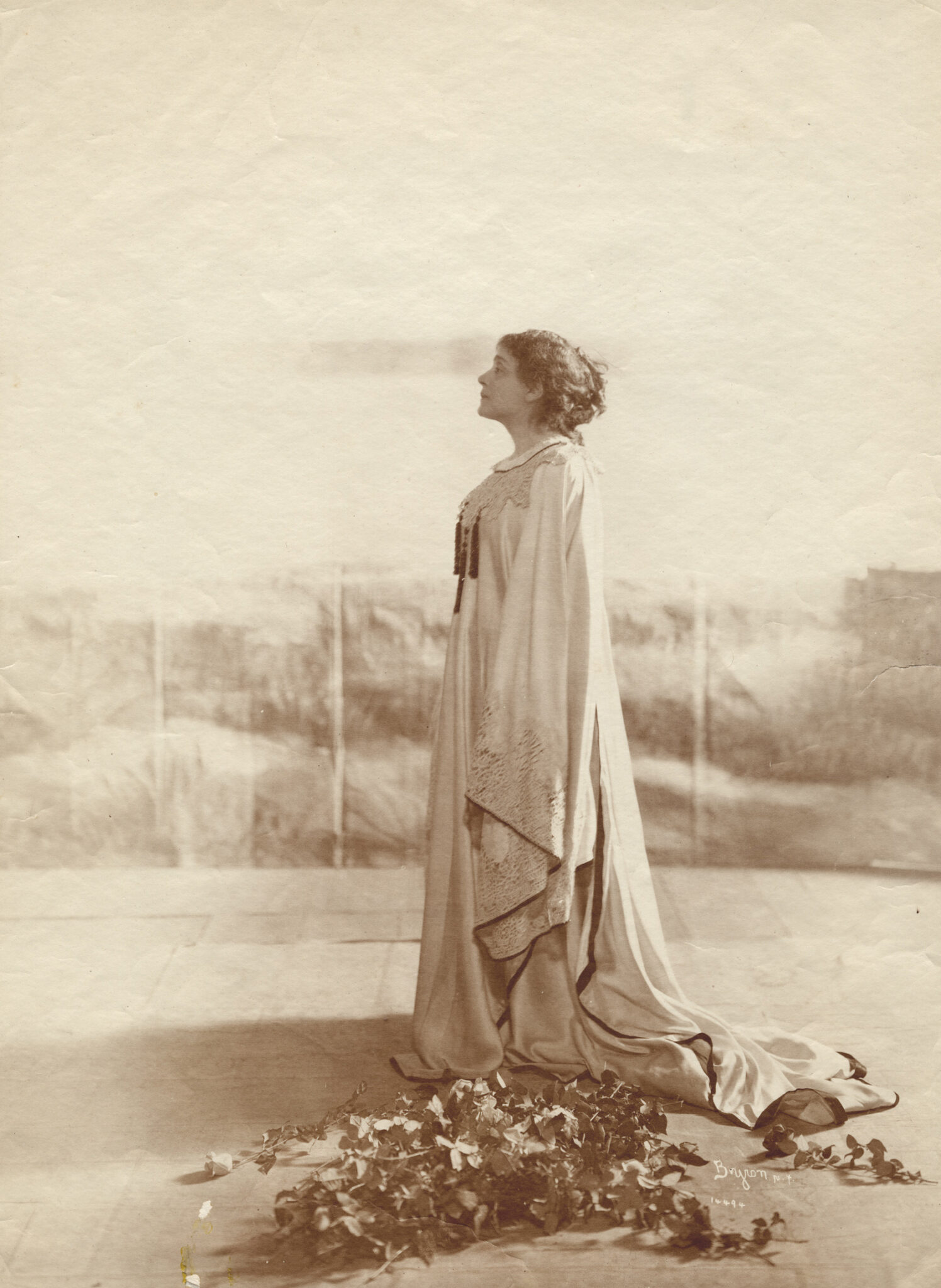
Eleonora Duse in La Gioconda (New York, 1902)

La Gioconda is an 1899 play by the Italian writer Gabriele D'Annunzio. In November 1902 in New York, a Broadway version of the play was presented at the Victoria Theatre and featured the acclaimed Italian actress Eleonora Duse. La Gioconda was also adapted for film on at least four occasions: three times in the silent era and as a Mexican film in 1951.

== Film adaptations ==
- Love Re-Conquered (La Gioconda) (1912), directed by Luigi Maggi
- The Devil's Daughter (1915), directed by Frank Powell
- La Gioconda (1916), directed by Eleuterio Rodolfi
- La Estatua de carne (1951), directed by Chano Urueta
