= The Devil's Daughter (1915 film) =

1915 film

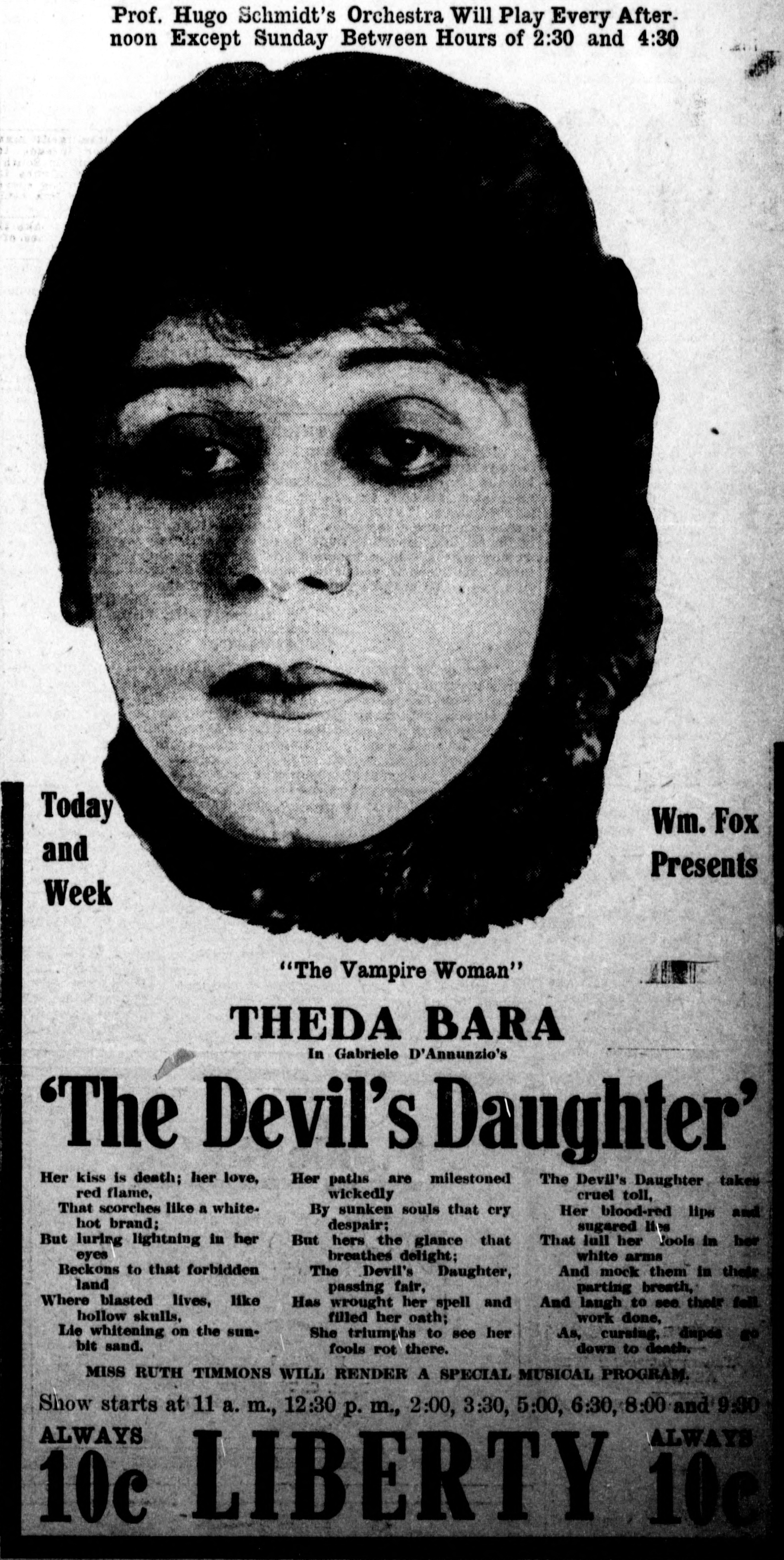
- Advertisement in The Tacoma Times
- Directed by: Frank Powell
- Written by: Garfield Thompson; Joseph H. Trant
- Based on: La Gioconda by Gabriele D'Annunzio
- Produced by: William Fox
- Starring: Theda Bara; Paul Doucet
- Cinematography: David Calcagni, chief Caesar Ponci; Arthur Boeger
- Distributed by: Fox Film Corporation
- Release date: June 16, 1915
- Running time: 5 reels (approximately 65 minutes) (Note: According to the reference How Movies Work by Bruce F. Kawin (New York: Macmillan Publishing Company, 1987, pp. 46-47), a full 1000-foot reel of film in the silent era had a maximum running time of 15-16 minutes. Silent films were generally projected at a "standard" speed of 16 frames per second, much slower than the 24 frames of later sound films. Also, all the reels in a multiple-reel film were usually not filled to their maximum capacities.)
- Country: United States
- Language: Silent with English intertitles

The Devil's Daughter is a lost 1915 American silent drama film directed by Frank Powell and starring Theda Bara. Based on the 1899 play La Gioconda by Italian writer Gabriele D'Annunzio, this updated adaptation portrayed the story of vengeful woman—a "vamp"—who uses her beauty and sensuality to lure a young man to ruin, destroying both his marriage and his career as an artist. The film was produced by Fox Film Corporation and shot at the company's studio in Fort Lee, New Jersey and on location in St. Augustine, Florida.

The Library of Congress includes the film among the National Film Preservation Board's updated 2019 list of "7,200 Lost U.S. Silent Feature Films" produced between 1912 and 1929.

== Plot ==
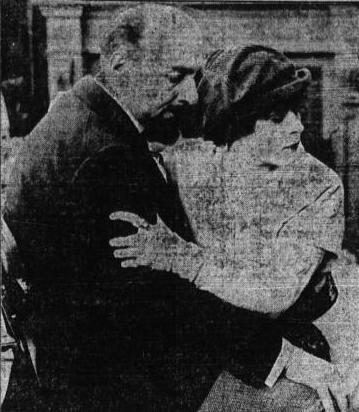
Bara with Robert Wayne

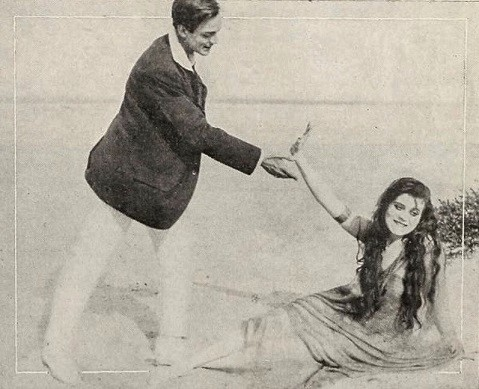
Film still of Lucio (Doucet) meeting Gioconda (Bara) for the first time on a beach, where she was "half-clothed" and dancing by herself

The story, set in contemporary Italy, portrays the destruction of a young couple's marriage caused by Gioconda Dianti, a beautiful but highly vindictive young woman. After being deserted by her former lover Luigi, she longs for revenge and vows, "As this man has done to me, so shall I do to all men. From now on my heart is ice, my passion consuming fire. Let men beware." She then acts on that pledge and dedicates herself to seducing and ruining the lives of men she meets. Soon she focuses her spiteful intentions on Lucio Sattella, a talented sculptor she encounters on a beach. Gioconda quickly manages to charm her way into his life by visiting Lucio's studio and agreeing to model for his masterpiece, a statue of a sphinx. Her flirtatious manner and enticing looks quickly captivate the artist, who is already married but falls hopelessly in love with her, so much so that he abandons his wife Silvia and their three-year-old daughter Beata. (Note: In 1915 reviews, news items and articles, the spelling of Doris Heywood's surname varies, in some instances being cited as Haywood, Heyward, or Hayward.)

Later, torn by the emotional stresses of his lust for Gioconda, his love of art, and guilt for leaving his family, a despondent Lucio attempts suicide. He shoots himself but survives. Silvia then nurses her severely wounded husband back to health; nevertheless, he returns to Gioconda. Enraged with jealousy and now desperate, Silvia confronts the sinister interloper in Lucio's studio, where the "vamp" continues to ridicule Silvia's efforts to win back her husband. A struggle between the two women ensues as Gioconda attempts to destroy Lucio's sculpture. The sphinx statue is knocked over, falls on Silvia, and crushes and maims her hands. (Note: As with many film adaptations, aspects of the plot can often differ from the stage version. The New York Times in its review of the 1902 Broadway production of La Gioconda states that when Silvia tries to save the statue as it topples over, her hands are crushed and are later amputated.) Finally, the crippled wife discards any lingering devotion she has to Lucio and leaves him. Tormented by remorse and his rising hatred for the ruthless siren who has ruined his life, the once hopeful artist descends into madness, becoming a "raving maniac". As for Gioconda's fate, she too "suffers a fearful end". (Note: This plot summary is composed from storyline descriptions in reviews featured in 1915 publications such as the June 26 issue of Motion Picture News, the June 30 issue of the Nashville Tennessean, and the July 3 issue of Motography. With regard to Gioconda's fate or "fearful end", 1915 reviews imply that she was either killed or, like Lucio, descended into madness.)

== Cast ==
- Theda Bara as Gioconda Dianti (Note: Characters' names are confirmed and cited as given in digital transcription of a 1922 reprint in the original Italian of LA GIOCONDA TRAGEDIA by Gabriele D'Annunzio (Milano, Italia). "Classics" index, Doctrine Publishing Corporation Digital, online digital repository of over 63,000 literary works.)
- Paul Doucet as Lucio Settala
- Doris Heywood as Silvia Settala
- Jane Lee as Beata Settala, Lucio and Silvia's Child
- Victor Benoit as Cosimo Dalbo, Lucio's Friend
- Robert Wayne as Lorenzo Gaddi, Master Sculptor
- Jane Miller as Francesca Doni, Silvia's Sister
- Elaine Ivans (Note: In 1915 news items and in current film references, actress Elaine Ivans' surname is sometimes cited as "Evans".) as La Sirenetta
- Edouard Durand as Roffiano
- Clifford Bruce as Undetermined Role

== Production ==
According to the film's 1915 copyright registration (LP6036), "scenarist" Joseph H. Trant based his storyline on the translated Broadway version of D'Annunzio's La Gioconda, which premiered in New York on November 4, 1902. From the outset of Fox Film's planning for its screen adaptation, no one other than Theda Bara was considered to play the title role. In fact, numerous sources in 1915 report that one of the conditions that D'Annunzio insisted on in selling the rights of his 1899 play to Fox was that the studio guaranteed Bara would star in its film. Throughout production, the working title used for the film by Fox was simply "The Vampire", a title that trade publications often cited in their news items and updates about the "photoplay's" development in the weeks prior to its release.

=== Filming in New Jersey and Florida ===
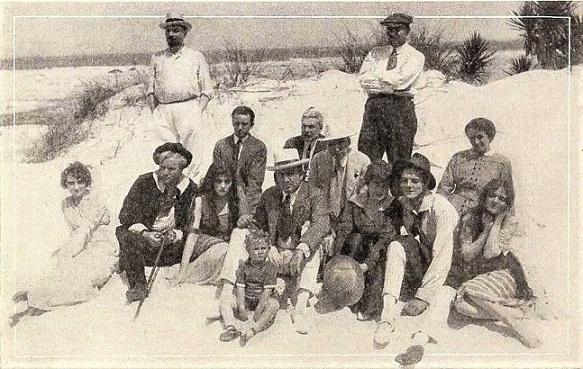
The film's company in St. Augustine, May 1915: child star Jane Lee at center in front of Director Powell, Theda Bara left of Powell, Jane Miller at far left, Doris Heywood and Paul Doucet right of Powell

The Devil’s Daughter was filmed during the latter half of April and May 1915, with some interior and backlot scenes shot at Fox's studio facilities in New Jersey, which were located near the corner of Main Street and Linwood Avenue in Fort Lee. After shooting needed scenes there, Director Powell in early May left New Jersey by train, taking his cast and crew on location to St. Augustine, Florida. Production setups around that city proved to be uncomfortable physically for the company and challenging at times for filming. Trade publications in 1915 informed their readers that the actors and support personnel had to endure high temperatures and painful sunburns, as well as cope with poisonous snakes, sharks, and large sand crabs that were "liable to nip your toes off". "On the day of their arrival in the subtropical city", reports Motion Picture News, "the thermometer registered 96 degrees." The trade journal also mentions that Bara's initial attempt to escape the heat by swimming in the ocean was cut short by the sudden appearance of "well-known triangular black fins" cutting through the water. In addition, while she and other cast waited on the beach, Powell and his camera crew began scouting the surrounding area for additional locations to film outdoor scenes, but they were "compelled to sacrifice some of their very best backgrounds" due to the "prevalence of moccasin snakes".

Along with taking landscape and ocean footage near St. Augustine, Powell's crew filmed scenes at the mansion and grounds of the Villa Flora, the home of a Dr. Garnett. They also used the Hotel Ponce De Leon and the Hotel Alcazar as settings for additional scenes. When not rehearsing, filming, or scouting other locations, the cast and crew spent time in their accommodations at the Hotel Marion, where its proprietors—Mr. and Mrs. Henry Muller—placed their "85-foot motor yacht, Hilda, at the disposal of Frank Powell". A news item in the popular entertainment paper Variety documents that the director and his company had returned to New Jersey from Florida by May 28. Powell then began final editing and completed other post-production tasks before Fox released the film in mid-June.

== Release, promotion and censorship ==
Promotion of the film in 1915 included not only widespread advertisements and commentaries in newspapers and trade publications but also personal appearances by some cast members. In its issue of June 25—nine days after the film's release—Variety announces that Bara's costar, Paul Doucet, would be presenting a lecture in her hometown, Cincinnati, Ohio. The theme of his talk, states the paper, would be "on how d'Annunzio's 'Gioconda,' now called 'The Devil's Daughter,' was made" and would be presented when the film opened "at the Grand [Opera House] in a few days". Yet, public interest in the film and specific interest in Bara, "the vampire woman", extended well beyond lectures and special appearances by its cast; it also prompted some state censor boards to ban the motion picture entirely from their communities or to cut substantial parts from it they deemed unacceptable. Two states in particular, Ohio and Kansas, drew significant media coverage during the summer and early fall of 1915 for their efforts to prevent or limit the public's exposure to the film. In a news item dated June 30 and titled "'Devil's Daughter' Censored", Variety updates its subscribers on the situation in Cincinnati:

Another illustration of the old-maidishness of the Ohio Board of Censors was its order eliminating 1,800 feet of the Fox picture...After the notice was served the film was cancelled by Manager Louis Foster, who had booked it for his Grand opera house. Foster said that the parts eliminated were practically every scene in which Miss Bara appeared. A private performance of the picture was given at the Grand, at midnight, Saturday morning. It was attended by newspapermen and society friends of Miss Bara. Persons who went there expecting to be shocked came away very much disappointed. It was agreed by all that there was nothing terrible about the picture, and that the censors had "struck out" again. (Note: Given that the film's reported length at release was 5,000 feet, the removal of 1,800 feet constituted the elimination of 36 percent of the distributed print or a cut of over 21 minutes from a full running time of approximately 60 minutes.)

Following the midnight screening at his theater, the Grand's manager and the secretary of Cincinnati's retail association traveled to Columbus on June 28 "to protest" the censors' cuts to the film and to ask authorities at the state capital "to reconsider" their order. The businessmen's appeal resulted in some success. The state board of censors, in response to their visit and to mounting criticism of the board's actions by Ohio citizens, agreed to allow theaters to present the film with fewer deletions, reducing their cut order from 1,800 feet to 300 feet. The same scenario over censorship of the film occurred in Cleveland, including a private viewing of it. The select audience there, however, even included that city's police officers, all of whom gave their "hearty approval of the film" after seeing it and were "astonished" that Ohio's "censors had chopped it."

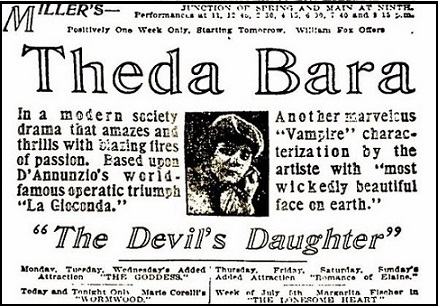
Advertisement promoting the film at the 800-seat Miller's Theatre in Los Angeles, June 1915

While artistic and retail interests battled censors in Ohio, the full film was screened without incident in some other states but did confront censorship elsewhere. The Chicago-based film journal Motography reported in September 1915 that the Fox production had been widely shown in Oklahoma "without shocking public morals." Kansas, though, banned the film from being shown anywhere in the state. Its three-member board of review, including Carrie Simpson from the town of Paola, had also "barred and forbidden" several other films after its action against The Devil's Daughter. According to Motography, the increasing restrictions placed on the content of various motion pictures by Kansas had been "bitterly condemned by film producers and exhibitors" but the state's total "ban on 'The Devil's Daughter' aroused the flame of resentment to white heat."

== General reception ==
Despite the controversies surrounding the film in some locations, the motion picture in 1915 received generally positive reviews in newspapers and trade publications. Bara herself is the focus in most of those reviews, for in the months prior to the release of The Devil's Daughter she had greatly increased her celebrity in three other Fox releases, most notably by her performance in A Fool There Was, which was also directed by Frank Powell. Like that film, The Devil's Daughter again showcased Bara as a femme fatale, a "vamp" who lures men with her exotic beauty and sexuality and then drains them—not of their actual blood like the vampire character developed by Irish novelist Bram Stoker—only of their will and complete ability to resist her control. In assessing Bara's return to that role, the critic for Motion Picture News, George Proctor, recognizes in his review her screen appeal and its association with the film's artistry. He also commends the performances of several other cast members:

Theda Bara's physical charms and many scenes chosen for their photographic beauty give the picture considerable artistic value. In fact the whole handling of the theme, under Frank Powell's direction, is artistic. The plot cannot be taken literally. One seldom meets beautiful creatures half-clothed on the beach or roaming through the woods. But the picture, as an artistic, dramatic conception and a vehicle for Theda Bara, is quite sufficient. Doris Heywood distinguished herself as the wife and Jane Miller was good as the sister. Paul Doucet was fine in the hard role of Lucio. Victor Benoit is Lucio's friend, Robert Wayne, the master sculptor, and little Jane Lee got in some of her clever work as the baby.

Many newspapers across the country in 1915 also complimented the film and the power of Bara's sultry portrayal of Gioconda. The Arizona Republican on July 26 describes the production as a "beautiful picture", adding "It is a five reel film of surpassing strength, more enthralling than 'A Fool There Was'". The newspaper also sums up Bara's role, characterizing it as "a veritable daughter of the devil, breaking up homes, alienating husbands and wives and wrecking the lives of promising young men." In Connecticut the Hartford Courant judged the film to be "one of the most sensational pictures ever made", while in Georgia The Atlanta Constitution viewed it as a "wonderful story" with an "exceptionally strong" cast. Various comments in newspapers about the film's impressive "European" settings also testify to Powell's success in using St. Augustine as a shooting location. In addition to admiring Bara's performance and her "French mannerisms", The Minneapolis Morning Tribune commended the production's overall screen presentation, noting that its "luxuriant tropical surroundings and Italian gardens make a surpassingly beautiful picture". The reviewer for The Pittsburgh Gazette Times agreed and asserted, "The artistic environment of Rome predominates every exterior scene."

Certainly, in connection to the restrictions and bans being imposed on the film by some state authorities, there were a host of related negative comments about the melodrama, such as those made by one detractor in Ohio who deemed it "outrageous" and possessing no moral other than "illustrating the vile effects that a vampire has upon men's homes". In contrast to the earlier positive comments about the film in The Atlanta Constitution, another reviewer in the newspaper's edition of July 11, "Pansy Painfall", criticizes the production's "overdone theatrics" and takes issue with Bara's screen appeal:

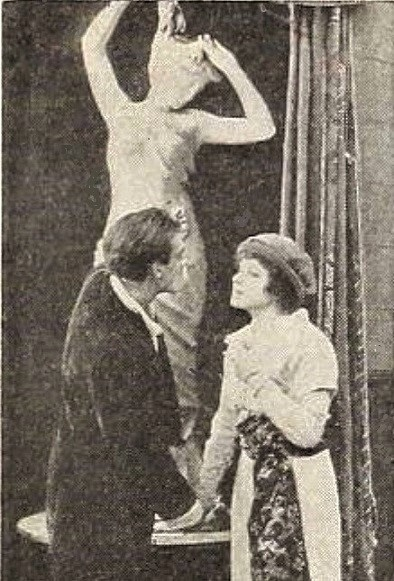
Stills in 1915 publications provide the general content of a few scenes in the lost film, including this one of Lucio and Gioconda in his studio.

Theda Bara can have all the public adulation she gets, as well as the renown, of "the most beautifully wicked face in the world." Give me, in preference, a homely-looking personage in ginghams, who can trundle the vacuum cleaner and feed the chickens and spank a young desperado whenever he needs it. I frankly admit that Bara stuff, as manifested in "The Devil's Daughter," fails to strike me. But the public seems to disagree with me. The women flocked in droves Monday and Tuesday to see it at the Strand...My escort asked why so many women of all types came to look at a vampire performance, and I told him that they came so they could go home and feel pure and undefiled in contrast to the vampire's exhibition. They go home and throw it up to their husbands—and maybe get new hats.

Also, not all film-industry publications supported the photoplay. The Moving Picture World labeled it a "poor imitation" of A Fool There Was and hampered by a "wearisome" plot with overly dramatic scenes that at one point "brought a general laugh from the large audience at a private showing" in New York.

== "Lost" film status ==
A small number of film stills from the production and some photographs of the cast on location in St. Augustine can be found in 1915 newspapers and trade journals, but no footage of The Devil's Daughter or fragments of negatives or prints from any of its five reels are known to be preserved among the extensive holdings of the Library of Congress, the George Eastman Museum, the film collection of the Museum of Modern Art, the holdings of the UCLA Film and Television Archive, or in European film repositories. This motion picture is therefore "presumed lost".

== See also ==
- List of lost silent films (1915–1919)
- 1937 Fox vault fire: In Little Ferry, New Jersey in July 1937, a catastrophic fire destroyed more than 40,000 reels of negatives and prints at a storage facility for 20th Century Fox. Many of the films featuring Theda Bara were among those extensive losses.
