= May and December =

1910 short film

- Directed by: Frank Powell
- Written by: Mary Pickford
- Story by: Frank Powell
- Produced by: D. W. Griffith
- Starring: Mary Pickford
- Cinematography: Arthur Marvin
- Production company: Biograph Company
- Distributed by: Biograph Company
- Release date: June 20, 1910
- Running time: 7 minutes
- Country: United States
- Language: Silent (English intertitles)

May and December is a 1910 American silent short romance film starring Mary Pickford and directed by Frank Powell.

== Plot ==
Penniless young man June reluctantly proposes to the wealthy, older October and is accepted, much to his disgust. Meanwhile, rich, elderly December proposes to poor, young May; she agrees, though reluctantly. The two couples meet, and it becomes clear that December and October know each other. May and June are immediately attracted to each other. On a second encounter, May and June are left alone together. Each confides to the other that they are marrying for money, but decide the price is too high. When December and October return, May and June inform them that the marriages are off. May returns December's engagement ring, and the young couple depart. October faints into December's arms. When she recovers, she takes the ring and puts it on her finger, to December's dismay.

== Cast ==
- Mary Pickford as May
- Billy Quirk as June
- Kate Bruce as October
- W. Chrystie Miller as December
- Charles Hill Mailes

== Production ==
Pickford sold the story to Griffith for $15. She later recalled:

Mr. Griffith announced he needed a split or half-reel. "Anybody got a story in mind?" he asked. Three or four of us dashed for paper and pencil and were scribbling like mad. During my first weeks at Biograph I had quite unashamedly sold Mr. Griffith an outline of the opera 'Thais' for $10. This time I ventured a plot of my own, and to the great annoyance of the men, he bought it.

== Preservation status ==
The film survives in the archives of the Library of Congress and the Museum of Modern Art.

== Home media ==
It was included in the 2017 DVD collection Mary Pickford Rare Shorts III.
