= Anne Sutherland (actress) =

American actress

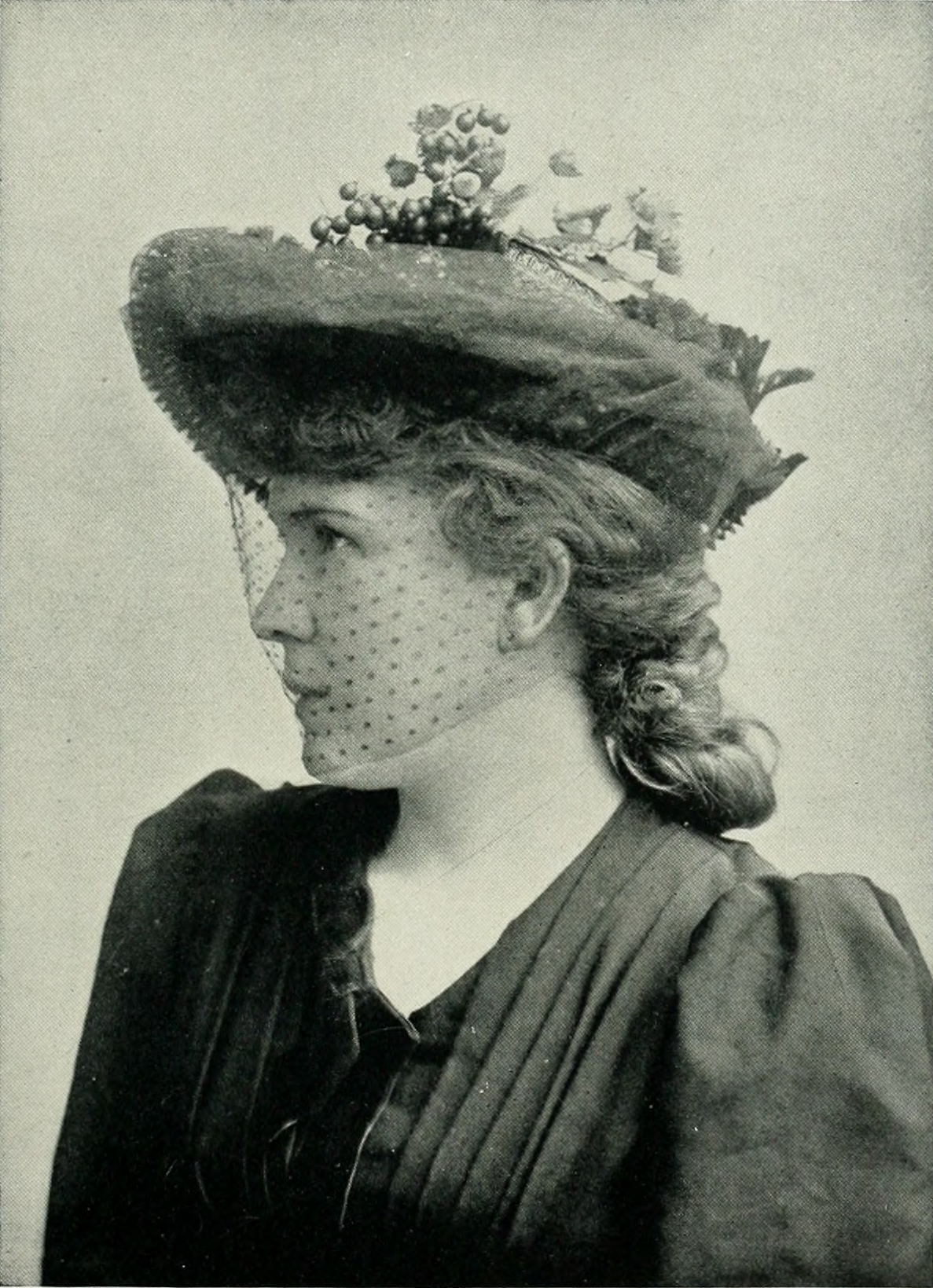
- Born: Anne Bland Sutherland; March 1, 1867; Washington, D. C.
- Died: June 22, 1942 (aged 75); Brentwood, New York Long Island
- Other names: Annie Sutherland; Ann Sutherland; Anne B. Sutherland
- Occupation: actress
- Years active: 1880s-1932
- Spouse(s): Richard Field Carroll(m.1886 div.1891; remarried a second time in 1892); Charles Harding(m.1907)
- Children: Anne Carroll(died as a teen)

Anne Sutherland (March 1, 1867 – June 22, 1942) was an American stage and screen actress who began acting in the 1880s. She began as a juvenile playing in an HMS Pinafore production. She appeared on stage in the 1880s-1890s with many greats of the period such as Henry E. Dixey in Adonis (1883), Lydia Thompson in Oxygen (1886), Nat C. Goodwin in The Nominee (1891), Georgia Cayvan in The City of Pleasure (1896), Joseph Jefferson in Rip Van Winkle and Mrs. Leslie Carter in Zaza (1899). One of her outstanding later plays was Craig's Wife (1925) which costarred Chrystal Herne. She had a featured part in Houseparty (1929), which ran for 173 performances on Broadway.

She was variously known as Annie Sutherland, Ann B. Sutherland and Anne Sutherland at different points in her career.

== Family ==
She was married to actor/singer Richard Field Carroll (1865-1925), a.k.a. Richard F. Carroll, and had a daughter Anne Carroll who died in her teens. Reportedly she and Carroll divorced, remarried and divorced again. She then married actor Frederick Hartley who died of pneumonia in 1904. In 1907 she married Charles Harding.

== Selected filmography ==
- The Kreutzer Sonata (1915)
- A Woman's Resurrection (1915)
- Motherhood (1917)
- The Debt (1917)
- God's Crucible (1921)
- My Sin (1931)
- It Happened in Paris (1932)
