= Mary Moreland =

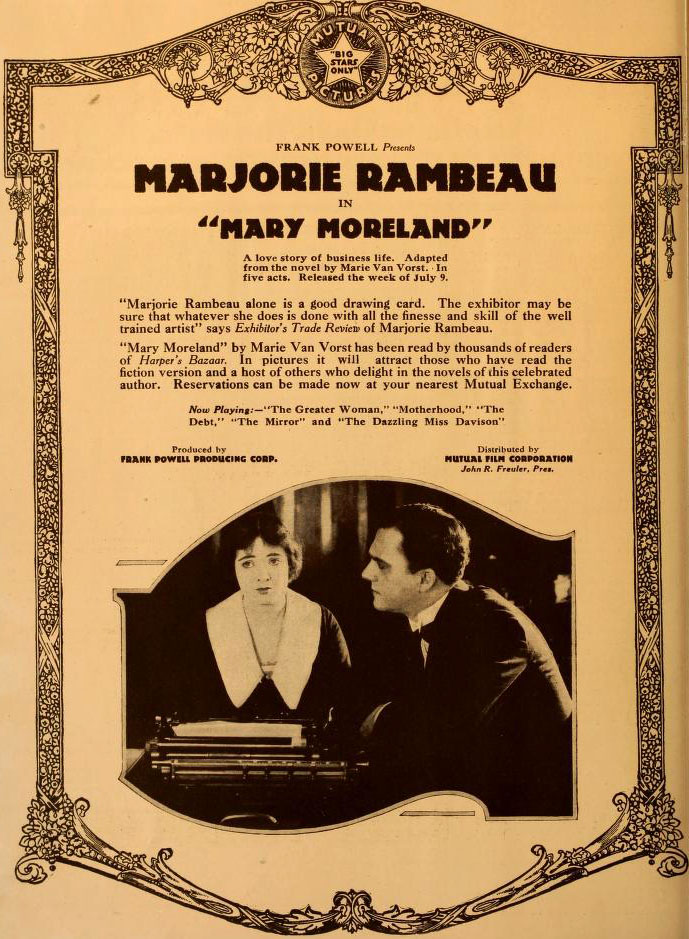
- Advertisement
- Directed by: Frank Powell
- Written by: Marie Van Vorst (novel); Clara Beranger (scenario)
- Produced by: Frank Powell
- Starring: Marjorie Rambeau
- Cinematography: William F. Wagner
- Distributed by: Mutual Film
- Release date: July 9, 1917
- Running time: 5 reels
- Country: United States
- Language: Silent (English intertitles)

Mary Moreland is a 1917 American silent drama film starring stage actress Marjorie Rambeau that was released through Mutual Film.

== Plot ==
As described in a film magazine review, Thomas Maughm (Elliott), a Wall Street broker and unhappily married, finds himself in love with his secretary Mary Moreland (Rambeau). He confesses his love and she leaves his employ. After Mary has traveled around in various positions, she returns home. She learns of the death of Thomas' wife and this time she listens to his confessions of love.

== Cast ==
- Marjorie Rambeau - Mary Moreland
- Robert Elliott - Thomas Maughm
- Jean La Motte - Mrs. Daisy Maughm
- Augusta Burmeister - Mrs. Moreland
- Fraser Tarbutt - Basil Romney
- Edna Holland - Cicely Torrance
- Frank A. Ford

== Reception ==
Like many American films of the time, Mary Moreland was subject to cuts by city and state film censorship boards. The Chicago Board of Censors cut an intertitle that stated "Don't you know that your wife is going to have a child?"

== Preservation ==
With no prints of Mary Moreland located in any film archives, it is considered a lost film.
