= Primrose Path (1940 film) =

1940 film by Gregory La Cava

- Directed by: Gregory La Cava
- Screenplay by: Gregory La Cava; Allan Scott
- Based on: Primrose Path; 1938 play by Robert H. Buckner; Walter Hart; February Hill 1934 novel by Victoria Lincoln
- Produced by: Gregory La Cava
- Starring: Ginger Rogers; Joel McCrea
- Cinematography: Joseph H. August
- Edited by: William Hamilton
- Music by: Werner R. Heymann
- Distributed by: RKO Radio Pictures
- Release date: March 22, 1940
- Running time: 93 minutes
- Country: United States
- Language: English
- Budget: $702,000
- Box office: $1,200,000

Primrose Path is a 1940 melodrama film from RKO starring Ginger Rogers and Joel McCrea. Produced and directed by Gregory LaCava, it is an adaptation of the novel February Hill. It follows the tragic romance of a young woman determined not to follow her mother and grandmother into prostitution. Marjorie Rambeau, Henry Travers, and Miles Mander appear in support, with Rambeau receiving a nomination for the Academy Award for Best Supporting Actress.

== Plot ==
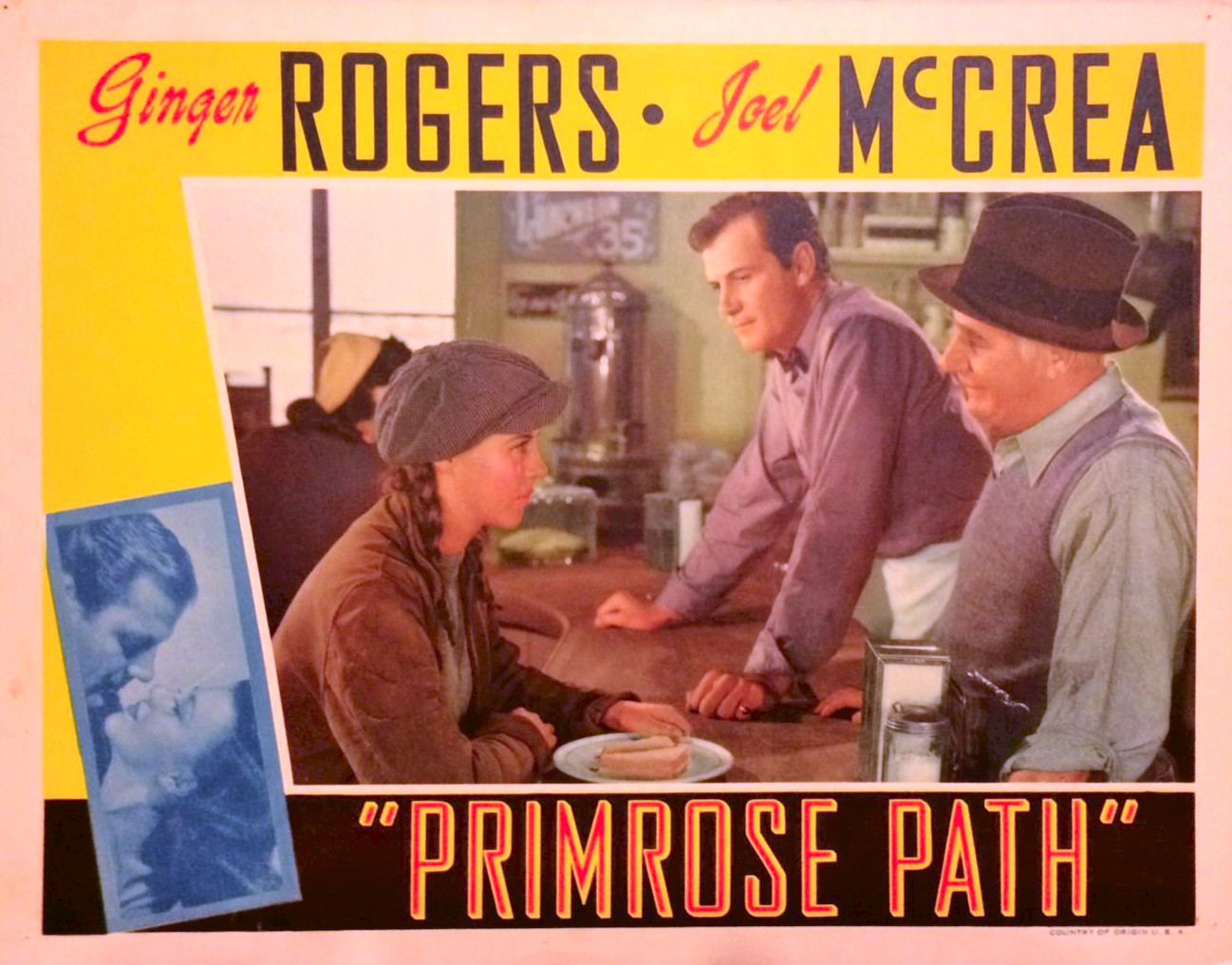
Lobby card for Primrose Path

Tomboy Ellie May Adams (Ginger Rogers) keeps her virtue despite her difficult circumstances. Her alcoholic, Greek scholar father Homer (Miles Mander) is unemployable, leaving her mother Mamie (Marjorie Rambeau) to support the family through prostitution. Her retired-prostitute grandmother (Queenie Vassar) sees nothing wrong with their shared profession.

One day, Ellie May warily accepts a ride to the beach from Gramp (Henry Travers). Gramp runs a beachside restaurant and gas station along with wisecracking Ed Wallace (Joel McCrea). Ellie May falls in love with Ed and eventually, after lying to him about being thrown out by her family over him, gets him to marry her. She becomes an industrious, well-liked waitress in the restaurant.

However, she makes a grave mistake when she finally agrees to take Ed to meet the rest of her family. When her lies about her relations are revealed, Ed leaves her. To add to her woes, her father accidentally shoots her mother during one of his drunken, half-hearted attempts at suicide. Before she dies, Mamie gets Ellie May to promise to take care of the family.

When Ellie May cannot find work, in desperation, she finally faces the prospect of selling herself for money. Thelma (Vivienne Osborne), Mamie's friend and co-worker, arranges for Ellie May to accompany her, her current boyfriend, and "Mr. Smith" (an uncredited Charles Lane) on a car trip to San Francisco. On the way, Ellie May gets them to stop at Ed's favorite nightclub, where she bitterly pretends to him to be what he thinks she's become. However, after a private talk with a sympathetic Mr. Smith, Ed figures out the truth and takes Ellie May back. He also accepts the burden of her family.

== Cast ==
- Ginger Rogers as Ellie May Adams
- Joel McCrea as Ed Wallace
- Marjorie Rambeau as Mamie Adams
- Henry Travers as Gramp
- Miles Mander as Homer Adams
- Queenie Vassar as Grandma
- Joan Carroll as Honeybell Adams
- Vivienne Osborne as Thelma
- Carmen Morales as Carmelita, Ed's former girlfriend

== Production ==
The film was adapted from the novel February Hill by Victoria Lincoln (uncredited for legal reasons).

Allan Scott said he devised an entirely new story.

== Reception ==
The film made a profit of $110,000.
