= The Feud Girl =

1916 film by Frederick A. Thomson

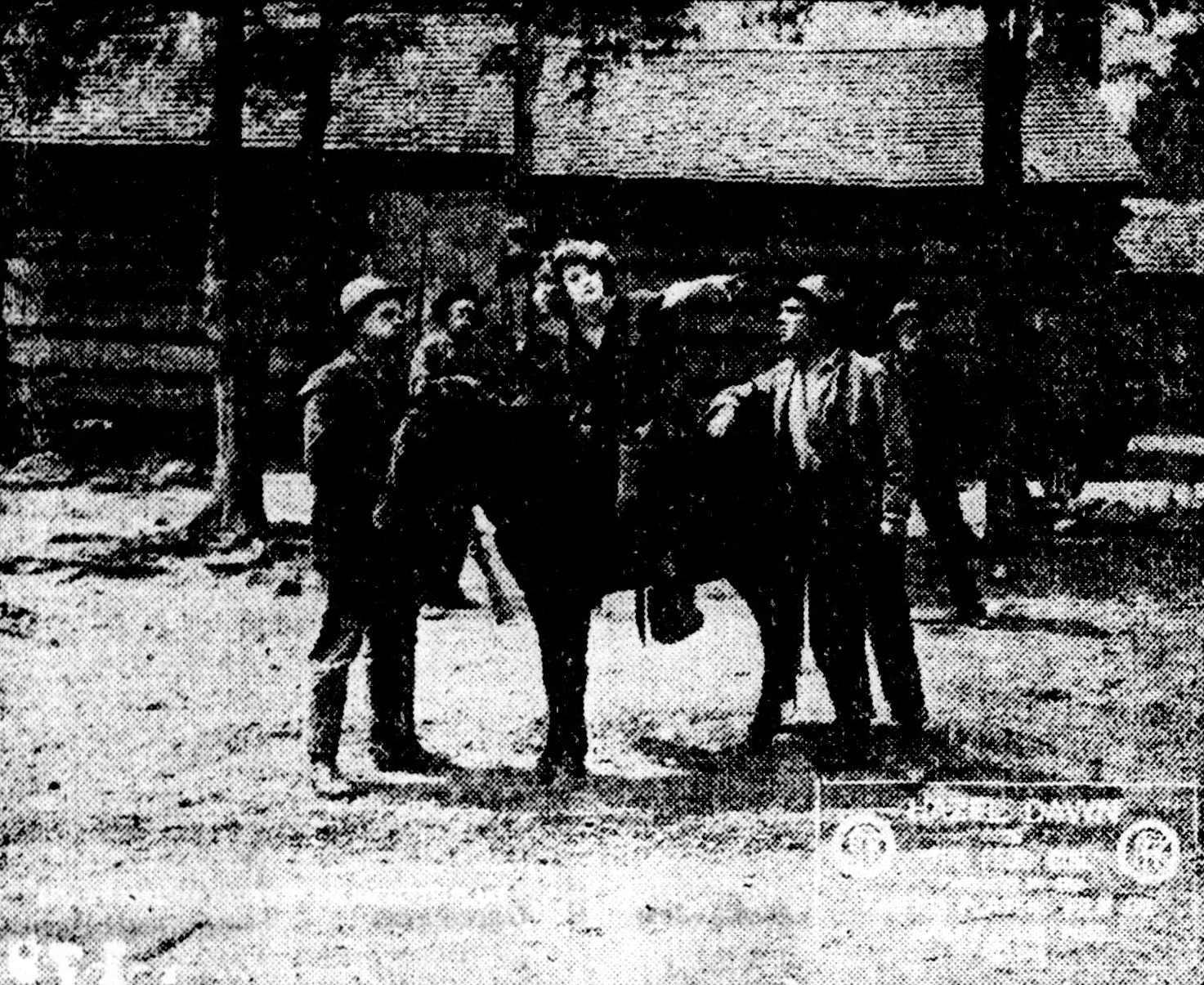
- Scene from film
- Directed by: Frederick A. Thomson
- Screenplay by: Charles Logue
- Starring: Hazel Dawn; Irving Cummings; Arthur Morrison; Hardee Kirkland; Russell Simpson; Gertrude Norman
- Cinematography: Herbert J. Siddons
- Production company: Famous Players Film Company
- Distributed by: Paramount Pictures
- Release date: May 14, 1916
- Running time: 50 minutes
- Country: United States
- Language: English

The Feud Girl is a 1916 American drama silent film directed by Frederick A. Thomson and written by Charles Logue. The film stars Hazel Dawn, Irving Cummings, Arthur Morrison, Hardee Kirkland, Russell Simpson and Gertrude Norman. The film was released on May 14, 1916, by Paramount Pictures.

== Cast ==
- Hazel Dawn as Nell Haddon, 'The Spitfire'
- Irving Cummings as Dave Bassett / Dave Rand
- Arthur Morrison as Luke Haddon
- Hardee Kirkland as Judd Haddon
- Russell Simpson as Zeb Bassett
- Gertrude Norman as Sue Bassett
- George Majeroni as Marlowe
- Edna Holland as Anne Marlowe
