= Robert Elliott (actor, born 1879) =

American actor

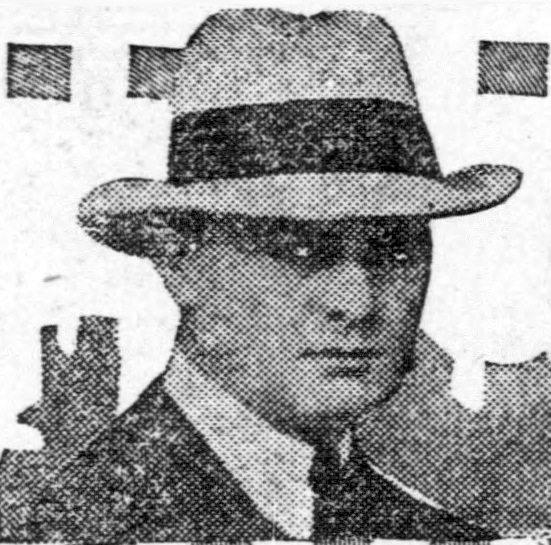
- Elliott, 1919
- Born: Richard Robert Elliott; October 9, 1879; Columbus, Ohio, U.S.
- Died: November 15, 1951 (aged 72); Los Angeles, California, U.S.
- Occupation: Actor
- Years active: 1916–1951
- Spouse: Ruth Thorp (m. 1920)

Richard Robert Elliott (October 9, 1879 – November 15, 1951) was an American character actor who appeared in 102 Hollywood films and television shows from 1916 to 1951.

== Life and career ==
He was born Richard Robert Elliott in 1879 in Columbus, Ohio. Most of his main roles were in the silent era, in the sound era he mostly performed in supporting roles and bit parts. On the stage he originated the Sergeant O'Hara character opposite Jeanne Eagels in somerset Maugham's play Rain (1922).

Active in films from 1916, Elliott played Detective Crosby in the 1928 feature Lights of New York, the first all-talking sound film. One of his most notable roles to today's audiences was that of a Yankee officer playing cards with Rhett Butler (Clark Gable) in the film Gone with the Wind. The officer says of Rhett, "It's hard to be strict with a man who loses money so pleasantly."

== Personal life ==
Robert Elliott was married to Ruth Thorp (1889–1971) from 1920 until his death in 1951, aged 72, in Los Angeles, California.

== Selected filmography ==
- The Kiss of Hate (1916) - Sergius Orzoff
- Notorious Gallagher (1916) - Robert Ewing
- The Child of Destiny (1916) - Bob Stange
- Miss Petticoats (1916) - Rev. Ralph Harding
- Life's Shadows (1916) - Rodney Thorndyke
- Greed (1917) - Richard Cole
- Motherhood (1917) - Albert
- Mrs. Balfame (1917) - Dwight Rush
- The Debt (1917)
- The Mirror (1917) - Bob Merrill
- The Dazzling Miss Davison (1917) - Gerard Buckland
- Mary Moreland (1917) - Thomas Maughm
- Thou Shalt Not Steal (1917) - Roger Benton
- The Seven Deadly Sins (1917) - Richard Coe (Greed)
- Joan of Plattsburg (1918) - Capt. Lane
- Resurrection (1918) - Prince Nekludov
- When Men Betray (1918) - Raymond Edwards
- For the Freedom of the East (1918) - Robert Kenyon
- The Spirit of Lafayette (1919) - Lieutenant Richard Stanton
- Unknown Love (1919) - Captain Jack Tims
- A Woman There Was (1919) - Pulke
- Checkers (1919) - Arthur Kendal
- L'apache (1919) - Otis Mayne
- The Empire of Diamonds (1920) - Matthew Versigny
- The Money Maniac (1921) - Didier Bouchard
- A Virgin Paradise (1921) - Bob Alan
- Lonely Heart (1921)
- Fair Lady (1922) - Norvin Blake
- Without Fear (1922) - John Miles
- A Pasteboard Crown (1922) - Stewart Thrall
- The Broken Silence (1922) - Bruce Cameron
- Man and Wife (1923) - Dr. Howard Fleming
- Obey Your Husband (1928) - Mr. Kennedy
- Happiness Ahead (1928) - Detective
- Lights of New York (1928) - Detective Crosby
- Romance of the Underworld (1928) - Edwin Burke
- The Lone Wolf's Daughter (1929) - Ethier
- Protection (1929) - Wallace Crockett
- The Valiant (1929) - Minor Role (uncredited)
- Thunderbolt (1929) - Prison Chaplain
- Hide-Out (1930) - William Burke
- The Divorcee (1930) - Bill Baldwin
- Kathleen Mavourneen (1930) - Dan Moriarity
- Sweet Mama (1930) - Mack
- Men of the North (1930) - Sergeant Mooney
- The Doorway to Hell (1930) - O'Grady
- Captain Thunder (1930) - Morgan
- The Finger Points (1931) - City Editor Frank Carter
- The Maltese Falcon (1931) - Detective Lt. Dundy
- The Star Witness (1931) - Deputy Williams (uncredited)
- Murder at Midnight (1931) - Inspector Taylor
- Five Star Final (1931) - Brannegan
- The Ruling Voice (1931) - A Reformer (uncredited)
- Behind Stone Walls (1932) - District Attorney John Manson Clay
- Midnight Patrol (1932) - Howard Brady
- White Eagle (1932) - Capt. Blake
- The Phantom of Crestwood (1932) - Police Detective
- Madison Square Garden (1932) - Honest John Miller
- Self Defense (1932) - Dan Simmons
- The Crime of the Century (1933) - Police Capt. Timothy Riley
- The Woman Who Dared (1933) - Attorney
- The Return of Casey Jones (1933) - Casey Jones
- Heroes for Sale (1933) - 'Red' Squad Policeman #1
- Twin Husbands (1933) - Sergeant Kerrigan
- Lady Killer (1933) - Brannigan
- Gambling Lady (1934) - Graves
- Looking for Trouble (1934) - Police Captain Flynn
- Port of Lost Dreams (1934) - Lt. Andersen
- Transatlantic Merry-Go-Round (1934) - Inspector 'Mac' McKinney
- The World Accuses (1934) - Lt. Ryan
- Death Flies East (1935) - Griffith (uncredited)
- Times Square Lady (1935) - 'Brick' Culver
- Circumstantial Evidence (1935) - Detective Brown (uncredited)
- Black Sheep (1935) - Detective Clancy (uncredited)
- I'd Give My Life (1936) - Powell (uncredited)
- Trade Winds (1938) - Captain George Faulkiner
- Disbarred (1939) - L.M. Curron (uncredited)
- Made for Each Other (1939) - Airport Operations Manager (uncredited)
- The Saint Strikes Back (1939) - Chief Inspector Webster
- Should a Girl Marry? (1939) - Warden
- Mickey the Kid (1939) - FBI Agent Farrow
- I Stole a Million (1939) - Peterson
- The Roaring Twenties (1939) - First Detective
- Gone with the Wind (1939) - Yankee Major
- Invisible Stripes (1939) - Arresting Officer (uncredited)
- Abe Lincoln in Illinois (1940) - Minor Role (uncredited)
- Half a Sinner (1940) - Officer Kelly
- 'Til We Meet Again (1940) - Detective (uncredited)
- The Ghost Breakers (1940) - Lieutenant Murray (uncredited)
- Flowing Gold (1940) - Mac, Highway Patrolman (uncredited)
- White Eagle (1941) - Carlson (uncredited)
- Captain Tugboat Annie (1945) - Detective Franklin
- Chick Carter, Detective (1946) - Dan Rankin
- The Devil's Playground (1946) - Judge Morton (final film role)
