= Chicken a La King (film) =

1928 film

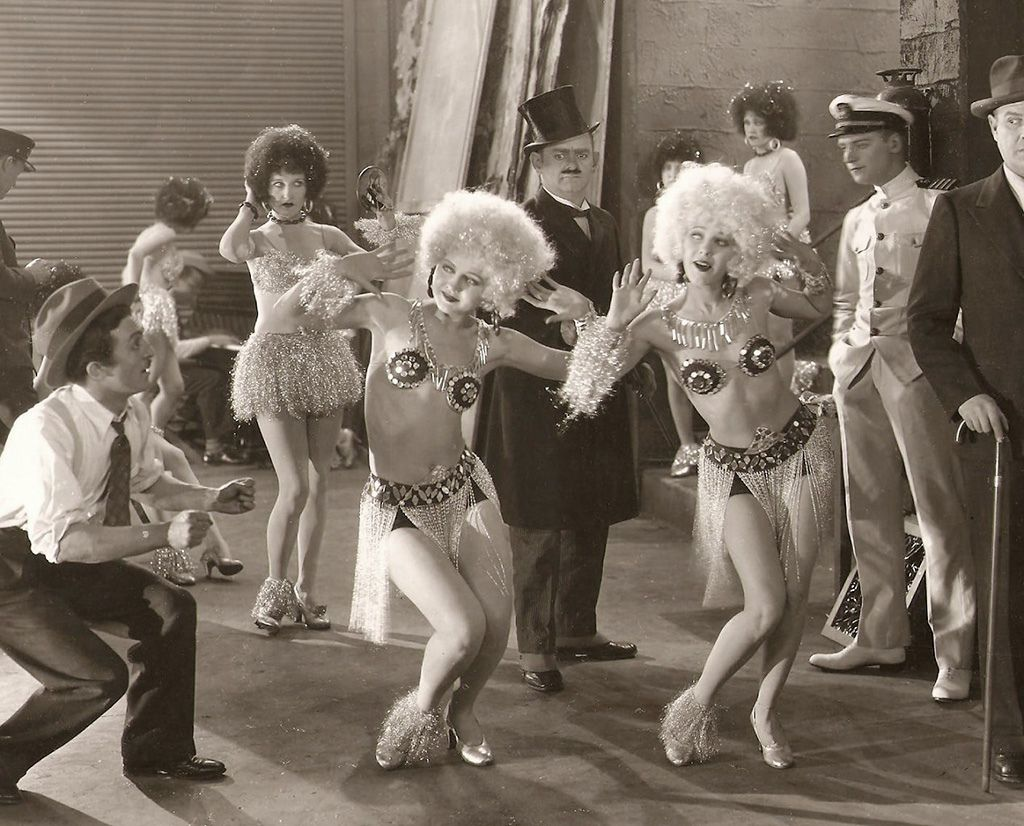
- Nancy Carroll and Frances Lee as showgirls in a scene from the film.
- Directed by: Henry Lehrman
- Written by: Harry Wagstaff Gribble (play); Wallace A. Mannheimer (play); Edward Barton (play); Izola Forrester; Mann Page; Isaac Paul; Jimmy Starr
- Produced by: Henry Lehrman
- Starring: Nancy Carroll; George Meeker; Ford Sterling
- Cinematography: Conrad Wells
- Edited by: Ralph Dietrich
- Production company: Fox Film
- Distributed by: Fox Film
- Release date: June 8, 1928
- Running time: 70 minutes
- Country: United States
- Languages: Silent; English intertitles

Chicken a La King is a 1928 American silent comedy film directed by Henry Lehrman and starring Nancy Carroll, George Meeker and Ford Sterling. The title is a reference to the dish Chicken à la King.

It is based on the 1927 stage play Mister Romeo.

== Plot ==
Concerned that her husband is spending too much time with a couple of chorus girls, his wife undergoes an expensive makeover.

== Cast ==
- Nancy Carroll as Maisie Devoe
- George Meeker as Buck Taylor
- Ford Sterling as Horace Trundle
- Arthur Stone as Oscar Barrows
- Frances Lee as Babe Lorraine
- Carol Holloway as Effie Trundle

== Preservation status ==
- The film is now lost.

== Bibliography ==
- Solomon, Aubrey. The Fox Film Corporation, 1915-1935: A History and Filmography. McFarland, 2011.
