= Houseparty (play) =

1928 American play by Kenneth Phillips Britton and Roy Hargrave

- Original language: English
- Written by: Kenneth Phillips Britton and Roy Hargrave
- Subject: Blackmail, manslaughter, and guilt
- Genre: Drama
- Setting: Library of a fraternity house at Williams College.

Premiere
- Date: September 9, 1929
- Place: Knickerbocker Theatre
- Directed by: Harry Wagstaff Gribble

Houseparty is a 1928 American play by Kenneth Phillips Britton and Roy Hargrave. It is a drama in three acts, with a single setting, and eighteen speaking characters. The story concerns a feckless college sophomore who accidentally kills a would-be blackmailer then is tried for her murder. The action of the first two acts takes place on a single evening in September, while the third act occurs six months later.

The play was first produced by A. L. Erlanger and George C. Tyler, and staged by Harry Wagstaff Gribble. It starred co-author Roy Hargrave, with Edward Woods, and Harriet MacGibbon in support. It had tryouts at Hartford and New Haven, Connecticut in September 1929, before premiering on Broadway later that month. The production was nearly cancelled during its first week; it shifted ownership and venues four times on Broadway during its run, which finished in February 1930 for 173 performances.

== Characters ==
Characters are as listed in contemporaneous newspaper reviews.

Lead

- Alan Bradford, a sophomore at Williams College from a wealthy family, is weak and vacillating.

Supporting

- Ronald Evans is also a sophomore at Williams, Alan's fraternity roommate and his best friend.
- Sally Andrews is Ronnie Evans' steady girlfriend, a Smith College student.
- Florence Milligan is an uninvited guest, a mercenary college widow whom desperation has made ruthless.
- Hortense Pfeiffer is an annoying house party guest from Smith College.

Featured

- Mrs. Milligan is Florence's mother.
- Mrs. White is a chaperone for the girls at the house party.
- Mrs. Rutherford is another chaperone for the house party.
- Edward Canby is a freshman pledge.
- Darrow Jencks is a senior, and the fraternity house president.
- Doris Callander is Darrow's girl and a house party guest.
- Malcolm White is a professor, with an M.A. and a Ph.D.
- Bill Warren is a sophomore with the fraternity.
- Chick Smyth is a sophomore with the fraternity.
- Marianne Guion is Chick's girlfriend and a house party guest.
- Bob Davis is a junior with the fraternity.
- Betty Creeling is Bob's girlfriend, and a house party guest.

Bit player

- James, the Steward

Walk-on

- Students and House Party Guests.

== Synopsis ==
This synopsis is compiled from contemporaneous newspaper reviews.

Act I (Library of a Fraternity House at Williams College. Late afternoon.) Alan Bradford is hoping to be selected as manager for a college athletic team. His best friend Ronald Evans and Sally Andrews encourage him. Edward Canby is teased and ordered about by various upperclassmen. Alan learns he has not been chosen for the manager's spot. Discouraged, he remains behind in the library when the others go out to a dinner dance. He is alone when Florence crashes the house party. Although she is well-known to many of the young men at Williams, she has chosen Alan as her victim. He has only been with her once, but his naivete, lack of confidence, and wealthy background make him ideal for her purposes. She wants $10,000, or she'll announce her pregnancy by him. He protests that he was only one of many, which she acknowledges, but will not back down. Alan is appalled to think of begging his father for the money, but is alarmed at Florence's threat to scream right there at the house party. As she badgers him, he steps towards her and accidentally knocks her down by the fireplace. Her head strikes a brass andiron, and she dies. Consumed by fear and guilt, Alan stuffs her body into a book cupboard. (Curtain)

Act II (Same as Act I. That evening.) The other fraternity brothers and their guests enter the library. They spend a while in general conversation, with the brothers objecting to their guests' use of the term "frat". Alan's friends notice his tense state and peculiar remarks. Mrs. Milligan is brought in by James; she is looking for her daughter Florence, whose own state of mind has been unsettled of late. Not having seen her, the others cannot offer any information, while Alan frets in silence. Someone suggests a party game, and during the course of this a dictionary is sought to resolve a point. As the only dictionary is in the book cupboard, it is about to be opened when Alan breaks down and confesses being responsible for her death. (Curtain)

Act III (Same as Act I. Six months later.) Alan returns to the fraternity house for the first time in six months, having been acquitted in an off-stage trial. Ostensibly there to collect his personal items before leaving with his family for a European holiday, he has actually come to brood at the site of the death. Secretly, he has made up his mind to commit suicide. But Ronald has sensed his torment, and with careful sympathy leads from black thoughts and instills hope for his recovery. (Curtain)

== Original production ==
=== Background ===
The first public announcement of Houseparty came in July 1929. Producers A. L. Erlanger and George C. Tyler had worked together in free association off and on for over thirty years. This play would be the first original production for their new partnership, though they were nearing the end of their producing careers. Casting was completed by early August, with co-author Roy Hargrove as one of the players.

Co-authors Kenneth Phillips Britton and Roy Hargrave had been classmates at Williams College. Britton was twenty-five when the first tryout was announced for Hartford, Connecticut, his hometown. This was his first professional play; he had previously completed several amateur works at Williams. A contributor to Atlantic Monthly and The New Yorker, Britton had a best-selling novel, Morning, Noon, and Night, and another to be published, One Drop of Midnight. He also composed poems, some of which were collected and published as Winter's Back in Town.

=== Cast ===
Cast from the Hartford and New Haven tryouts through the Broadway run.
Role	Actor	Dates	Notes and sources
Alan Bradford	Roy Hargrave	Sep 02, 1929 - Feb 01, 1930	Hargrave had a part in the early talkie Applause during June 1929.
Ronald Evans	Edward Woods	Sep 02, 1929 - Nov 30, 1929	
Ronald Evans	Donald Dillaway	Dec 02, 1929 - Feb 01, 1930	
Sally Andrews	Penelope Hubbard	Sep 02, 1929 - Feb 01, 1930	
Florence Milligan	Harriet MacGibbon	Sep 02, 1929 - Feb 01, 1930	MacGibbon had toured during 1928 with Roy Hargrave, Edward LeSaint, and Jack Dempsey in The Big Fight.
Hortense Pfeiffer	Betty Lawrence	Sep 02, 1929 - Feb 01, 1930	
Mrs. Milligan	Anne Sutherland	Sep 02, 1929 - Oct 12, 1929	Sutherland left for a tryout in She Walked Home by Anne Nichols.
Mrs. Milligan	Lorna Elliott	Oct 14, 1929 - Nov 30, 1929	
Mrs. Milligan	Anne Sutherland	Dec 02, 1929 - Feb 01, 1930	
Mrs. White	Julia Hay	Sep 02, 1929 - Feb 01, 1930	
Mrs. Rutherford	Louise Macintosh	Sep 02, 1929 - Nov 30, 1929	
Mrs. Rutherford	Ethel Morrison	Dec 02, 1929 - Feb 01, 1930	
Edward Canby	Charles Cromer	Sep 02, 1929 - Feb 01, 1930	
Darrow Jencks	Matthew Smith	Sep 02, 1929 - Feb 01, 1930	
Doris Callander	Helen Dodge	Sep 02, 1929 - Oct 26, 1929	
Doris Callander	Dorothy Harris	Oct 28, 1929 - Feb 01, 1930	
Malcolm White	Edward J. LeSaint	Sep 02, 1929 - Feb 01, 1930	
Bill Warren	Waldo Edwards	Sep 02, 1929 - Feb 01, 1930	
Chick Smyth	Charles Dill	Sep 02, 1929 - Feb 01, 1930	
Marianne Guion	Edith Hargrave	Sep 02, 1929 - Feb 01, 1930	She was the 18-year-old younger sister of Roy Hargrave.
Bob Davis	Billy Quinn	Sep 02, 1929 - Feb 01, 1930	
Betty Creeling	Cynthia Rogers	Sep 02, 1929 - Feb 01, 1930	

=== Tryouts ===
The first tryout for Houseparty occurred at Parsons Theatre in Hartford, Connecticut, on September 2, 1929. The local reviewer was impressed with the writing, acting and staging. He thought the play an ambitious task for two neophyte writers, particularly since the neurotic protagonist was an unsympathetic character. After four performances in Hartford, the production moved to the Shubert Theatre in New Haven, Connecticut on September 5, 1929, for three more days of tryouts. Hartford Courant critic Albert J. Duffy, in writing of the production's move to Broadway, wondered whether Houseparty would be making its "metropolitan debut under a handicap since it has been placed in the barn-like Knickerbocker and its hard to say whether the players will be able to get their story across in the wide open spaces of the playhouse".

=== Broadway premiere and reception ===
Houseparty had its Broadway premiere at the Knickerbocker Theatre on September 9, 1929. The reviewer for The Brooklyn Daily Eagle called it "a very tense and gripping albeit gruesome play", and saluted the authors and director Harry Wagstaff Gribble for the psychological buildup to the second act climax. The Brooklyn Daily Times critic, also enthusiastic over the writing and Hargrave's performance, thought the show would be a certain success. Burns Mantle in the Daily News was less impressed, saying "Dramas about sophomores are pretty sure to seem excessively unimportant to any one except sophomores", though he too complimented Roy Hargrave's performance.

Betty Longacre thought the writing showed a touch of Poe, in both the corpse stuffed into a cupboard and the second-act buildup to Alan's breakdown and confession. The New York Times reviewer thought the play had "some crudely effective and gripping scenes" that would hold interest until the end, but wondered whether audiences would necessarily find it "pleasant entertainment". The opening night was marred by the collapse of an audience member in the balcony at the start of the second act. Carried to the manager's office, the 60-year-old-man was pronounced dead by a doctor from New York General Hospital. His son, a Williams College graduate who had taken him to the play, said he suffered from heart disease.

Rowland Field, who attended a later matinee, judged Houseparty "one of the most worthwhile plays the new season has offered".

=== Changes of venue and ownership ===
Houseparty closed at the Knickerbocker Theatre on Saturday September 21, 1929, and opened Monday, September 23, 1929, at the Cort Theatre. According to a later report, producer George C. Tyler had posted a closing note for Houseparty during the first week, but author Kenneth Phillips Britton had persuaded him to keep it open by investing some of his wealthy family's money in it. Britton took over the show from Tyler and Erlanger at this point. It closed at the Cort Theatre on Saturday, October 19, 1929, and reopened Monday, October 21, 1929 at Wallack's Theatre.

Houseparty spent only a week at Wallack's Theatre, closing on Saturday, October 26, 1929. Britton decided to close the show, but was persuaded to keep it open, with the cast collectively sponsoring it by taking little or no salary. With one day's notice, Houseparty moved over to the Waldorf Theatre at 50th Street on Monday, October 28, 1929. It remained at the Waldorf Theatre through mid-November with new owner Joe LeBlang, when suddenly business started to pick up. By December it was showing a profit as it approached its 100th performance. Finally, A. L. Jones and Morris Green bought the show from Joe Leblang, moving it to the 48th Street Theatre on December 30, 1929.

=== Broadway closing ===
The production closed its Broadway run on February 1, 1930 at the 48th Street Theatre, after 173 performances. (Note: This includes a matinee and evening performance for the last day.)
