= The Debt (1917 film) =

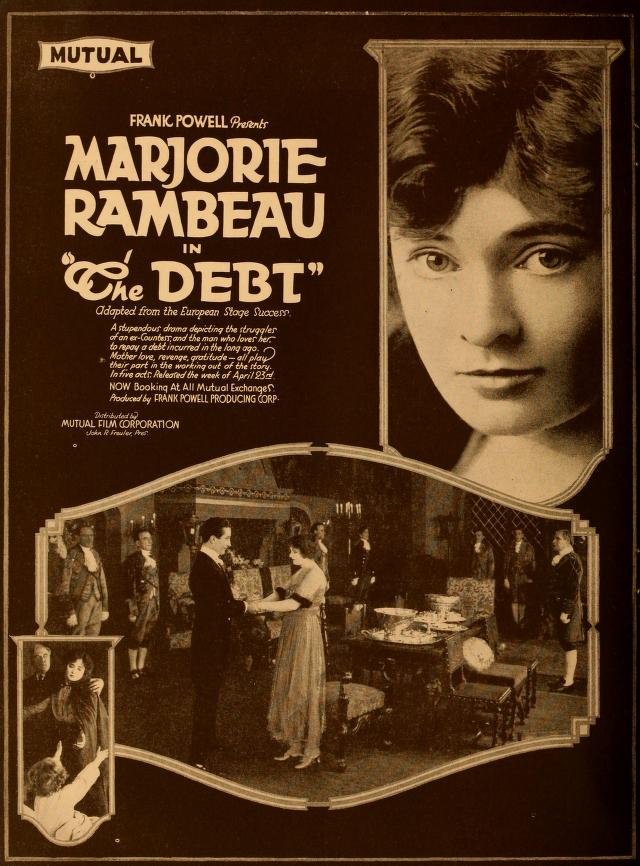
- Directed by: Frank Powell
- Written by: Clara Beranger; Kilbourn Gordon
- Produced by: Frank Powell
- Starring: Marjorie Rambeau
- Cinematography: Arthur Boeger
- Distributed by: Mutual Film
- Release date: April 23, 1917
- Running time: 50 minutes
- Country: United States
- Language: Silent film (English intertitles)

The Debt is a 1917 American silent drama film directed by Frank Powell and starring Marjorie Rambeau.

== Cast ==
- Marjorie Rambeau as Countess Ann
- Henry Warwick as Count
- T. Jerome Lawler as Baron Moreno
- Paul Everton as John Slater
- Nadia Gray as Ann's Daughter
- Anne Sutherland as Slater's Mother
- Agnes Ayres as The Girl
- Robert Elliott

== Preservation ==
With no prints of The Debt located in any film archives, it is considered a lost film.
