= 20 Mule Team =

1940 film

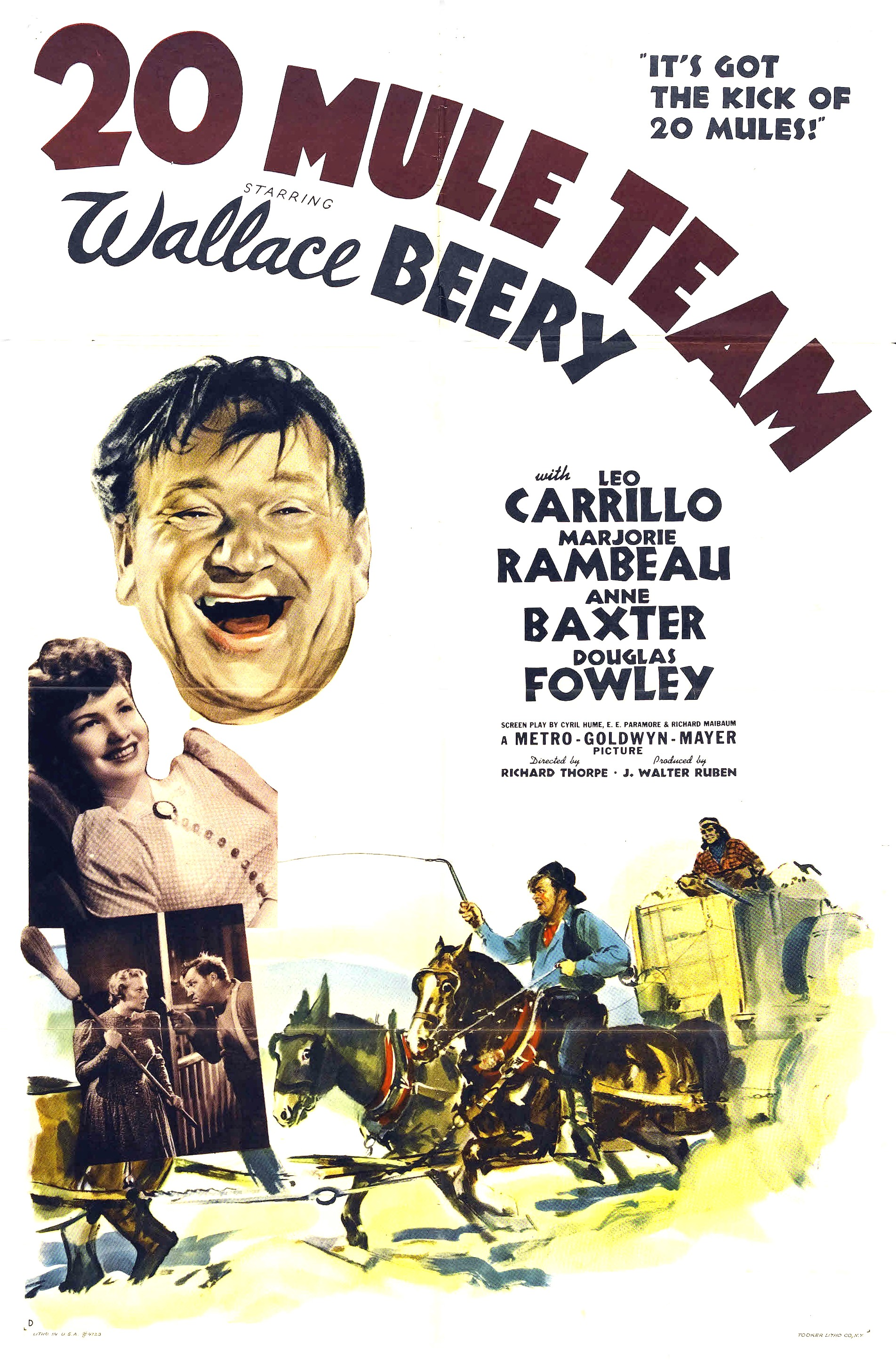
- Theatrical poster
- Directed by: Richard Thorpe
- Written by: Cyril Hume; Richard Maibaum; Edward E. Paramore Jr.
- Story by: Owen Atkinson; Robert C. DuSoe
- Produced by: J. Walter Ruben
- Starring: Wallace Beery; Leo Carrillo; Marjorie Rambeau; Anne Baxter; Noah Beery Jr.
- Cinematography: Clyde De Vinna
- Edited by: Frank Sullivan
- Music by: David Snell
- Color process: Black and white
- Production company: Metro-Goldwyn-Mayer
- Distributed by: Loew's Inc.
- Release date: May 3, 1940
- Running time: 84 minutes
- Country: United States
- Language: English

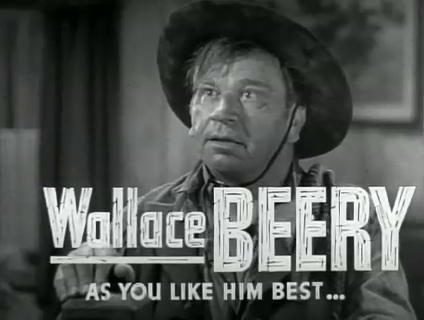
Wallace Beery as Skinner Bill

20 Mule Team (also known as Twenty Mule Team) is a 1940 American Western film directed by Richard Thorpe and starring Marjorie Rambeau, Anne Baxter and Wallace Beery, who appears with his nephew Noah Beery Jr.

20 Mule Team was originally released in sepia-tone, a brown-and-white process used by the studio the previous year for the Kansas scenes in The Wizard of Oz.

== Plot ==
In 1892 Death Valley, California, dwindling borax deposits have the Desert Borax Company at the brink of bankruptcy. The company is unable to pay its transport drivers, the 20 mule teams that haul the borax across the desert. Skinner Bill, a mule-team driver, is unable to pay his rent and is evicted by Josie Johnson, owner of the Furnace Flat saloon.

Stag Roper arrives in town and persuades the bank to extend the borax company's credit, hoping to discover more borax. Stag learns that Bill has found borax crystals from Chuckwalla, who died in the desert. Stag knows that Bill is wanted for murder and blackmails him to help wrest Chuckwalla's claim. Bill agrees, and the next day he joins Pete in an effort to locate the claim. Chuckwalla's former partner Mitch engages them in a shootout as he tries to protect his claim.

Josie's daughter Jean plans to elope with Stag, but Josie locks her in her room and confronts Stag. He shoots Josie and joins his partner Salters to steal Mitch's claim.

Bill and Pete pursue Stag and find Mitch unconscious in the desert. Following a shootout with Stag, Bill places Mitch on his mule and sends him back to town.

Mitch marries Josie, and they move to Los Angeles.

== Cast ==
- Wallace Beery as Skinner Bill
- Leo Carrillo as Piute Pete
- Marjorie Rambeau as Josie Johnson
- Anne Baxter as Joan Johnson
- Douglas Fowley as Stag Roper
- Noah Beery Jr. as Mitch
- Arthur Hohl as Salters
- Clem Bevans as Chuckawalla
- Charles Halton as Henry Adams
- Minor Watson as Marshal

== Reception ==
In a contemporary review for The New York Times, critic Theodore Strauss wrote that 20 Mule Team "moves little faster than its plodding mules" and assessed the cast performances:

"As the whip-slinging skinner Mr. Beery is as hard-headed, muddled and garrulous as of yore; Marjorie Rambeau, as the mother, is obviously full of woe, and Anne Baxter is an attractive little desert flower. Leo Carrillo, that perennial Indian, is practically left to shift for himself so far as the script is concerned. The remaining cast is adequate, including the mules, who are very docile. But they're awfully slow."
