= Loud Speaker =

- Written by: John Howard Lawson
- Original language: English
- Genre: Modernist farce

Premiere
- Date premiered: March 2, 1927
- Place premiered: New Playwrights' Theatre

Loud Speaker is a play by American playwright John Howard Lawson. It was first produced by the New Playwrights' Theatre at the 52nd Street Theatre in New York, opening on March 2 1927. Harry Wagstaff Gribble directed, Mordecai Gorelik designed the sets, Eugene L. Berton composed its music, and Leonard Sillman choreographed its dances.

== Characters ==
- Harry U. Collins
- Peterson
- Emma Collins
- Maid
- Clare Collins
- Josephus
- Johnnie Dunne
- Floradora Finnigan
- A Stranger with a Beard
- Dorothy Dunne
- Armenian Iky
- 1st Reporter
- 2nd Reporter
- 3rd Reporter
- 1st Photographer
- 2nd Photographer
- The Harlem Committee
- The Imperial Serenaders

== Sources ==
- Lawson, John Howard. 1927. Loud Speaker: A Farce. New York: The Macaulay Company.
