= Motherhood (1917 film) =

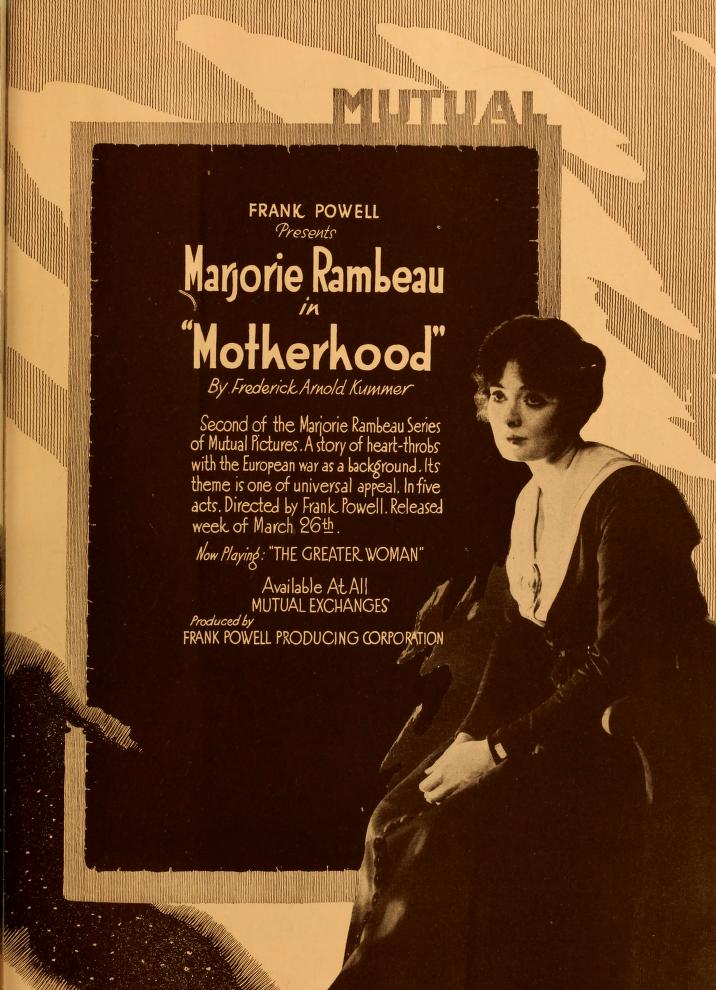
- Advertisement
- Directed by: Frank Powell
- Written by: Frederic Arnold Kummer (story); Clara Beranger
- Produced by: Frank Powell
- Starring: Marjorie Rambeau
- Distributed by: Mutual Film
- Release date: March 26, 1917
- Running time: 50 minutes
- Country: United States
- Language: Silent (English intertitles)

Motherhood is a 1917 American silent drama film directed by Frank Powell and starring Marjorie Rambeau.

== Cast ==
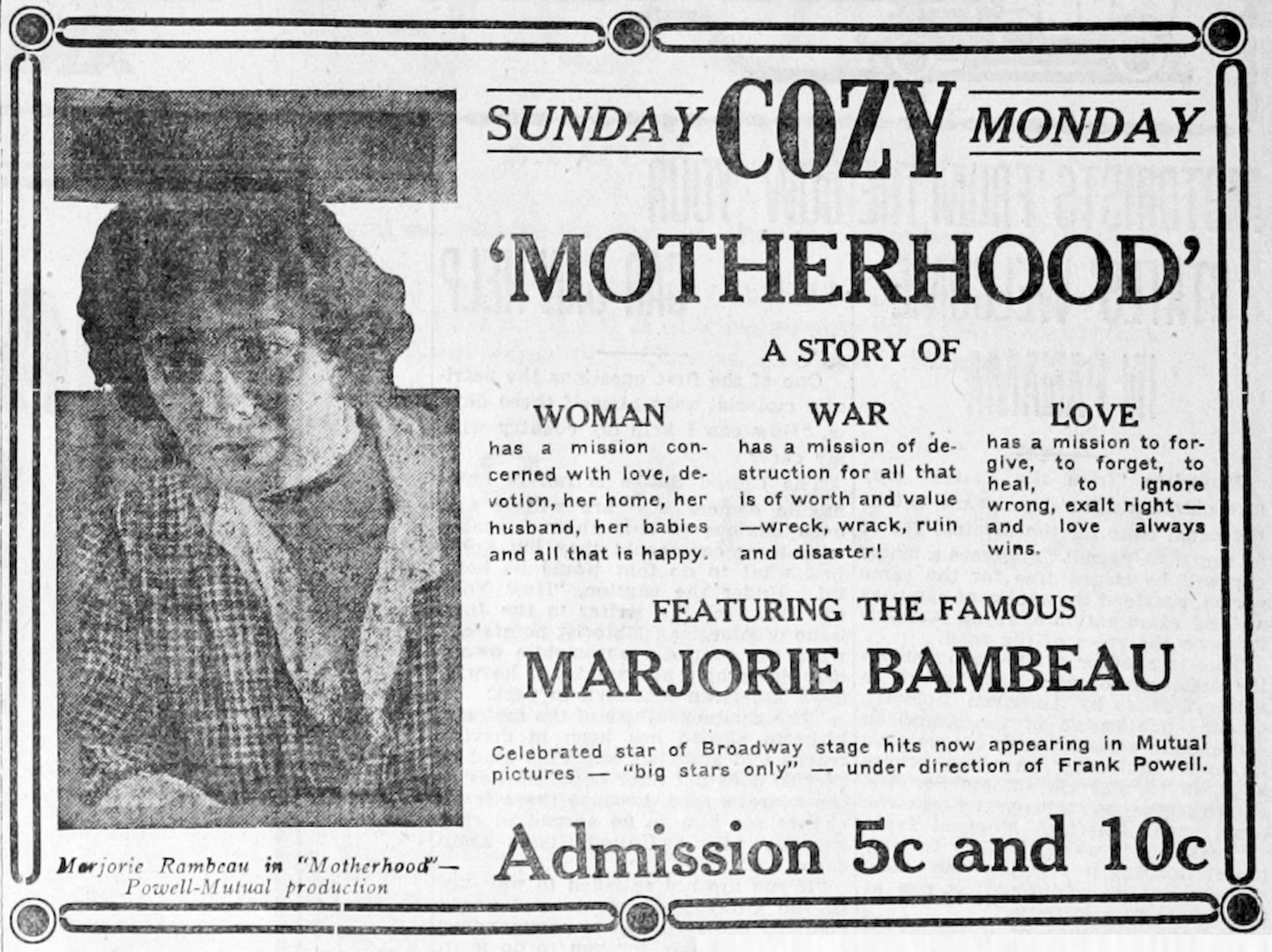
Newspaper advertisement

- Marjorie Rambeau as Louise
- Frank Ford as The Father
- Robert Elliott as Albert
- Paul Everton as Enemy Captain
- Aubrey Beattie as The Corporal
- Agnes Ayres as The Mother (as Agnes Eyre)
- Ruth Byron as Captain's Wife
- Lillian Page as Captain's Mother
- Anne Sutherland as Charlotte
- Frank Frayne as Her Son
- Robert Eaton as Her Son
- Lorna Volare as The Loved One

== Preservation ==
With no prints of Motherhood located in any film archives, it is considered a lost film.
