= The View from Pompey's Head =

1954 novel by Hamilton Basso

- Author: Hamilton Basso
- Language: English
- Genre: Mystery
- Publisher: Doubleday
- Publication date: 1954
- Publication place: United States
- Media type: Print (hardcover)
- Awards: Finalist for the National Book Award for Fiction
- Preceded by: The Light Infantry Ball (1960)

The View from Pompey's Head is a novel by the American writer Hamilton Basso, first published by Doubleday in 1954. It spent 40 weeks on The New York Times bestseller list. The book is set in the fictional small town of Pompey's Head, South Carolina.

The book was reprinted by the Louisiana State University Press in 1998 as part of its "Voices of the South" series. Both The View from Pompey's Head and its prequel, The Light Infantry Ball (1960), were finalists for the National Book Award for Fiction.

== Reception ==
The book was reviewed positively in 1954 by The New York Times: "Zestful and non-escapist entertainment... The most pleasantly and sensibly romantic novel to come my way in a long time." and by the Saturday Review: "His most impressive book to date. A long, mildly ironic, and deliberately discursive work, it weaves two of his favorite subjects, the subtle social distinctions of a small Southern city and the subtle questions of reputation and standing in New York literary and publishing circles."

Inez Hollander Lake, in her biography of Basso, wrote "Comfortably placed on The New York Times bestseller list for 40 weeks, selling more than 75,000 copies, and sold to the movies for $100,000, The View from Pompey's Head was the breakthrough that Basso had been waiting for. However, just as one cannot argue that Melville's Typee (1846) was a better book because it sold more copies than Moby-Dick (1851), so it is equally impossible to claim that The View from Pompey's Head was a masterpiece because it was so popular."

James Sallis, writing in The Boston Globe, commented: "What it did was gather up, like a self-anthology, themes and preoccupations from Basso's earlier work: the return-of-the-native motif so important to at least three previous novels, his ongoing investigation of old vs. new South, his penchant for both the novel of character (Relics and Angels, Courthouse Square) and the novel of ideas (Days Before Lent, Wine of the Country). Its tale of a lawyer defending a black man is a direct precursor of, almost certainly a model for, To Kill a Mockingbird.

== Film adaptation ==
Basso's novel was sold to 20th Century Fox for $100,000. The 1955 film was written and directed by Philip Dunne. Exterior shots and some interior shots of the video adaption were filmed in Savannah and Brunswick, Georgia. The story begins when the Manhattan attorney Anson Page (Richard Egan) returns to his Southern roots after 15 years, arriving in Pompey's Head, South Carolina, to investigate the mystery surrounding missing royalties due famous author Garvin Wales (Sidney Blackmer). In the small Southern town, Page sees the same problems of racial and class prejudices that had once prompted him to leave Pompey's Head. However, he also encounters his former flame, Dinah Blackford (Dana Wynter), who has married the businessman Mickey Higgins (Cameron Mitchell). While their romance is rekindled, various secrets of the past rise to the surface.

The child actors Charles Herbert and Evelyn Rudie were in the cast, along with DeForest Kelley. Elmer Bernstein provided the music score. Released November 4, 1955, the film was retitled Secret Interlude in the UK. Marjorie Rambeau received a Best Supporting Actress Award from the National Board of Review.

The film was made for $1.23 million and earned an estimated $1.5 million at the North American box office in 1955.

== See also ==
- List of American films of 1955
- List of films set in the Southern United States
