= Edna Holland =

American actress

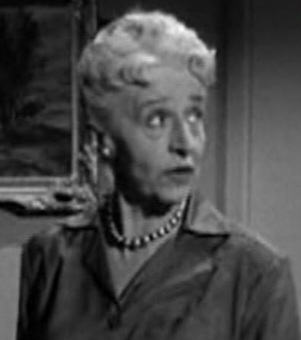
- Edna Holland in an episode of One Step Beyond (1959)
- Born: September 20, 1895; New York City, U.S.
- Died: May 4, 1982 (aged 86); Hollywood, Los Angeles, California, U.S.
- Occupation: Actress
- Years active: 1915–1966

Edna Milton Holland (September 20, 1895 – May 4, 1982) was an American actress. Her stage, screen and television career lasted from the beginning of the 20th century to 1965.

== Biography ==
Holland was the daughter of comedian Edmund Milton Holland and actress Emity Seward. Her uncle, Joseph Holland, was an actor.

As a child, she played in stage productions by David Belasco. Beginning in 1915, Holland appeared in silent films, including Always in the Way, The Feud Girl, Mary Moreland and The Masked Rider. She met her husband on the set of the Masked Rider, a fellow actor named Robert Taber (real name Stuart Fordham Tabor) who was originally from Sag Harbor, Long Island, New York. They married on May 15, 1919.

She was often seen as "The Other Woman" to actresses such as Mary Miles Minter. After an absence of nearly 20 years and numerous stage roles, Holland resumed making films in the late 1930s. Middle-aged, she often portrayed "professional women such as teachers, nurses or secretaries" in supporting roles or minor parts. She played her last role on television in The Andy Griffith Show in 1966.

Holland died from a ruptured aneurysm in 1982, aged 86.

== Selected filmography ==
- Always in the Way (1915) - Mrs. Helen Stillwell
- One Day (1916)
- The Feud Girl (1916)
- Mary Moreland (1917) - Cicely Torrance
- The Masked Rider (1919) - Juanita - Pancho's Daughter
- Lightning Bryce (1919, Serial) - Daisy Bliss - Ep. 1, 2 & 3 (uncredited)
- The Harvest Moon (1920) - Madame Mercier
- Sheltered Daughters (1921) - Sonia
- Bachelor Mother (1939) - Orphanage Matron
- Kid Nightingale (1939) - Madame Svenson - Gym Instructress (uncredited)
- Judge Hardy and Son (1939) - Nurse Trowbridge
- Forty Little Mothers (1940) - Miss Higgins (uncredited)
- My Favorite Wife (1940) - Johnny Weissmuller Inquirer (uncredited)
- Third Finger, Left Hand (1940) - Miss Lawton (uncredited)
- Sunny (1941) - Venus (uncredited)
- Tom, Dick and Harry (1941) - Miss Schlom, Janie's Boss (uncredited)
- Ringside Maisie (1941) - Third Nurse (uncredited)
- They Died with Their Boots On (1941) - Nurse (uncredited)
- Look Who's Laughing (1941) - Mrs. Hargrave (uncredited)
- Born to Sing (1942) - Welfare Worker (uncredited)
- Fingers at the Window (1942) - Clinic Nurse (uncredited)
- Calling Dr. Gillespie (1942) - Nurse Trayhan on Sixth Floor (uncredited)
- Laugh Your Blues Away (1942) - Mrs. Watson
- Dr. Gillespie's Criminal Case (1943) - Nurse Morgan (uncredited)
- Allergic to Love (1944) - Miss Peabody
- The Mark of the Whistler (1944) - Childrens Aid Society Woman (uncredited)
- Between Two Women (1945) - Nurse Morgan
- Kiss and Tell (1945) - Mrs. Mary Franklin
- Sunbonnet Sue (1945) - Julia
- Swing Parade of 1946 (1946) - Landlady (uncredited)
- Dark Alibi (1946) - Mrs. Foss
- Cluny Brown (1946) - Onlooker Outside Bookstore (uncredited)
- Centennial Summer (1946) - Nurse (uncredited)
- Living in a Big Way (1947) - Committee Woman (uncredited)
- Curley (1947) - Miss Payne
- The Hal Roach Comedy Carnival (1947) - Miss Payne, in 'Curly'
- Song of Love (1947) - Mrs. Fohling (uncredited)
- Intrigue (1947) - Miss Carr (uncredited)
- Louisiana (1947)
- Gentleman's Agreement (1947) - (uncredited)
- The Prairie (1948) - Esther Bush
- B.F.'s Daughter (1948) - Maurine, B.F.'s Secretary (uncredited)
- The Hunted (1948) - Miss Turner
- Ruthless (1948) - Libby Sims
- Letter from an Unknown Woman (1948) - Nun (uncredited)
- The Snake Pit (1948) - Elderly Nurse (uncredited)
- Shep Comes Home (1949) - Mrs. Fleming
- Criss Cross (1949) - Mrs. Thompson
- Henry, the Rainmaker (1949) - Mrs. Parker
- Son of a Bad Man (1949) - Mrs. Burley
- Sky Dragon (1949) - Demanding Old Woman Passenger (uncredited)
- The Lovable Cheat (1949) - Madame Pierquin
- Once More, My Darling (1949) - Mrs. Grant
- My Foolish Heart (1949) - Dean Whiting
- Key to the City (1950) - Mrs. Gertrude Allen (uncredited)
- No Man of Her Own (1950) - Nurse (uncredited)
- Never a Dull Moment (1950) - Neighbor at Shivaree (uncredited)
- Lonely Heart Bandits (1950) - Minor Role (uncredited)
- Three Secrets (1950) - Receptionist (uncredited)
- Strangers on a Train (1951) - Mrs. Joyce (uncredited)
- Love Nest (1951) - Mrs. Engstrand (uncredited)
- Scandal Sheet (1952) - NY Express Board Member (uncredited)
- Chained for Life (1952) - Mabel
- Paula (1952) - Old Nurse (uncredited)
- Has Anybody Seen My Gal? (1952) - Seamstress (uncredited)
- Meet Me at the Fair (1953) - Miss Burghey
- Treasure of the Golden Condor (1953) - Fontaine's Wife (uncredited)
- Roar of the Crowd (1953) - Mrs. Atkinson
- Alfred Hitchcock Presents (1955) (Season 1 Episode 4 "Don't Come Back Alive") - Librarian
- Ten Wanted Men (1955) - Ann (uncredited)
- Women's Prison (1955) - Sarah Graham
- The Night of the Hunter (1955) - Woman Feeding Hungry Children (uncredited)
- To Hell and Back (1955) - Mrs. Edna Houston (uncredited)
- My Sister Eileen (1955) - Matron (uncredited)
- The Girl in the Red Velvet Swing (1955) - Saleswoman (uncredited)
- The Court-Martial of Billy Mitchell (1955) - Mrs. Sturges (uncredited)
- Alfred Hitchcock Presents (1956) (Season 1 Episode 29 "The Orderly World of Mr. Appelby") - Mrs. Murchie
- The Kettles in the Ozarks (1956) - Minor Role (uncredited)
- Over-Exposed (1956) - Mrs. Gulick
- These Wilder Years (1956) - Nurse (uncredited)
- The Bad Seed (1956) - Saleslady (uncredited)
- Top Secret Affair (1957) - Myrna Maynard (uncredited)
- This Could Be the Night (1957) - Elderly Teacher (uncredited)
- Blood of Dracula (1957) - Miss Rivers
- Home Before Dark (1958) - Miss Angie (uncredited)
- The Last Angry Man (1959) - Gattling's Secretary (uncredited)
- Inside Daisy Clover (1965) - Cynara
