= Ruby Berkley Goodwin =

American writer

- Ruby Berkley Goodwin, from a 1935 publication
- Born: October 17, 1903; Du Quoin, Illinois, US
- Died: May 31, 1961 (aged 57); Los Angeles, California, US
- Occupations: Writer, actress
- Known for: It's Good to Be Black (1953)

Ruby Berkley Goodwin (October 17, 1903 – May 31, 1961) was an American writer and actress.

== Early life ==
Ruby Berkley was born in Du Quoin, Illinois, the daughter of Braxton Berkley and Sophia Jane Holmes Berkley. Her father was a coal miner and union organizer. The family moved to California when Ruby was a teenager. She trained as a teacher at San Diego State Teachers' College. Later she attended Fullerton Junior College. In 1949, she earned a bachelor's degree studying "world peace and understanding" from San Gabriel College.

Her younger brother Thomas Lucius Berkley (1915–2001) became a noted attorney and newspaper publisher in Oakland, California.

== Career ==
Berkley taught in El Centro, California as a young woman. She was personal secretary and publicist to actress Hattie McDaniel from 1936 to 1951. She is said to have helped McDaniel write her 1940 Oscars acceptance speech. She worked for Ethel Waters in a similar capacity. With her syndicated column, "Hollywood in Bronze", she was "the first accredited Black Hollywood correspondent".

In the 1940s she began acting on stage, in Los Angeles productions including The Little Foxes, Nine Pine Street, Anna Lucasta, The Member of the Wedding, Winesburg, Ohio, and The Male Animal. On film, she had roles in The View from Pompey's Head (1955), Strange Intruder (1956), The Alligator People (1959), High Time (1960), and Wild in the Country (1961). On television, she appeared in episodes of Cavalcade of America (1955, 1956), My Little Margie (1955), Star Stage (1956), Chevron Hall of Stars (1956), The Fireside Theatre (1956), General Electric Theater (1956), The Ford Television Theatre (1956, 1957), The Loretta Young Show (1957), Wagon Train (1957), The Adventures of Jim Bowie (1958), The Texan (1958), and Alfred Hitchcock Presents (1959).

Goodwin won a poetry award in 1935 at the Los Angeles Festival of Arts. She wrote short sketches to accompany William Grant Still's Twelve Negro Spirituals (1937). Her poetry was collected in From My Kitchen Window (1942) and A Gold Star Mother Speaks (1944). She wrote a musical, American Rhapsody (1942), a series of radio scripts, a novel, and a collection of autobiographical essays, It's Good to Be Black (1953). She was the first Black author to win a gold medal from the Commonwealth Club of California. Hugh H. Smythe reviewed It's Good to Be Black in The Crisis harshly, concluding that it "makes no real contribution towards improving relations between the races". More recent assessments find the book to be a valuable record of black life in Southern Illinois mining country.

== Personal life ==
Ruby Berkley married mechanic Lee Goodwin in 1924. They had five children together. She was named California's Mother of the Year in 1955. She died in Los Angeles in 1961, aged 57 years, from breast cancer. One of her sons, Robert Lee Goodwin, built a career in Hollywood as a screenwriter.
