= The Mirror (1917 film) =

- Directed by: Frank Powell
- Written by: Clara Beranger (scenario)
- Produced by: Frank Powell
- Starring: Robert Elliott; Marjorie Rambeau
- Cinematography: William F. Wagner
- Distributed by: Mutual Film Corporation
- Release date: May 21, 1917
- Running time: 50 minutes

The Mirror is a 1917 silent film drama directed by Frank Powell and starring Robert Elliott and Marjorie Rambeau. The film was distributed by the Mutual Film Company.

== Cast ==
- Robert Elliott as Bob Merrill
- Marjorie Rambeau as Blanche
- Irene Warfield as Maizie Goddard
- Paul Everton as Boyd
- Aubrey Beattie as Stage Director
- Frank A. Ford as Backer
- T. Jerome Lawler as Russell Dana (as T. Jerome Lawlor)
- Agnes Ayres

== Preservation ==
With no prints of The Mirror located in any film archives, it is considered a lost film.
