= The Dazzling Miss Davison =

- Directed by: Frank Powell
- Produced by: Frank Powell
- Starring: Marjorie Rambeau
- Production company: Frank Powell Producing Corp.
- Distributed by: Mutual Film Company
- Release date: June 18, 1917
- Running time: 50 minutes
- Country: USA
- Language: Silent..English

The Dazzling Miss Davison is a lost 1917 American silent drama film directed by Frank Powell and starring Marjorie Rambeau based on the 1910 book of the same name by Florence Warden. Powell produced the feature and released it through the Mutual Film Company.

== Cast ==
- Marjorie Rambeau as Rachel, The Dazzling Miss Davison
- Fred Williams as Guiding Light for Miss Davison
- Aubrey Beattie as Miss Davison's Shadow
- Agnes Ayres as Lillian, Miss Davison's Sister (as Agnes Eyre)
- Robert Elliott as Gerard Buckland
- Winifred Harris as Mrs. Jennings
- Frank A. Ford as Arthur Jennings
- Lillian Paige as Mrs. Van Santen
- Ruth Byron as Cora Van Santen
- Dore Flowden as Delia Van Santen
- Bert Starkey as Harry Van Santen
- T. Jerome Lawler as Denver Van Santen

== Plot ==
When Gerard Buckland sees a dishonest-looking fellow hand a diamond necklace to a beautiful young woman in a crowd, he is shocked by what he witnesses. Later when visiting the home of his friend, Arthur Jennings, he is astonished to see the young woman there. Miss Davison, unaware that she has been observed earlier, tells Gerald that she has a gift for picking pockets, but only as a party trick. Gerard doesn't know what to believe, but determines to find out the truth. When Gerald follows her to the country home of the Van Santens, an American family who like to gamble, he discovers more than he bargained for.

== Reception ==
According to the Montrose, Arbroath and Brechin review; and Forfar and Kincardineshire advertiser:

Few observers of the film will be able until the end to supply the answer to the question in the title, but it is one which explains all that has been puzzling before, and it provides a logical and dramatic finish to the story.

== Censorship ==
Before the film could be exhibited in Kansas, the Kansas Board of Review required the shortening of all gambling scenes.
