= Harry Wagstaff Gribble =

English-American author, stage director, screenwriter and playwright

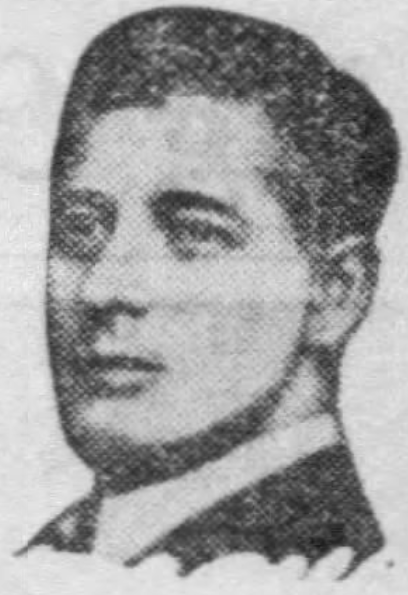
- Born: March 27, 1896; Sevenoaks, England
- Died: January 28, 1981 (aged 84); New York, U.S.
- Occupations: Author, stage director, screenwriter, playwright

Harry Wagstaff Gribble (March 27, 1896 – January 28, 1981) was an English-American author, stage director, screenwriter and playwright.

== Theater ==
- Trick for Trick, co-wrote
- His Family Tree, co-wrote play
- March Hares
- No More Ladies, director
- Houseparty, director
- The Taming of the Shrew in performance, fundraiser for the Finnish Relief Fund
- The Millionairess, director
- Old Man Murphy, co-wrote with Patrick Kearney
- The Temperamentalists
- Almost Faithful
- Anna Lucasta, co-wrote an adaptation of the script with Abram Hill
- Loud Speaker, director

== Filmography ==
- Chicken a La King, co-wrote the play it was based on
- Our Betters, co-wrote screenplay adaptation based on the 1917 play of the same title by Somerset Maugham
- Stella Dallas, writer
- A Bill of Divorcement, writer of adaptation based on A Bill of Divorcement by Clemence Dane
- Madame Racketeer, co-directed with Alexander Hall
