= Frank Powell =

Canadian actor & director (1877–1957)

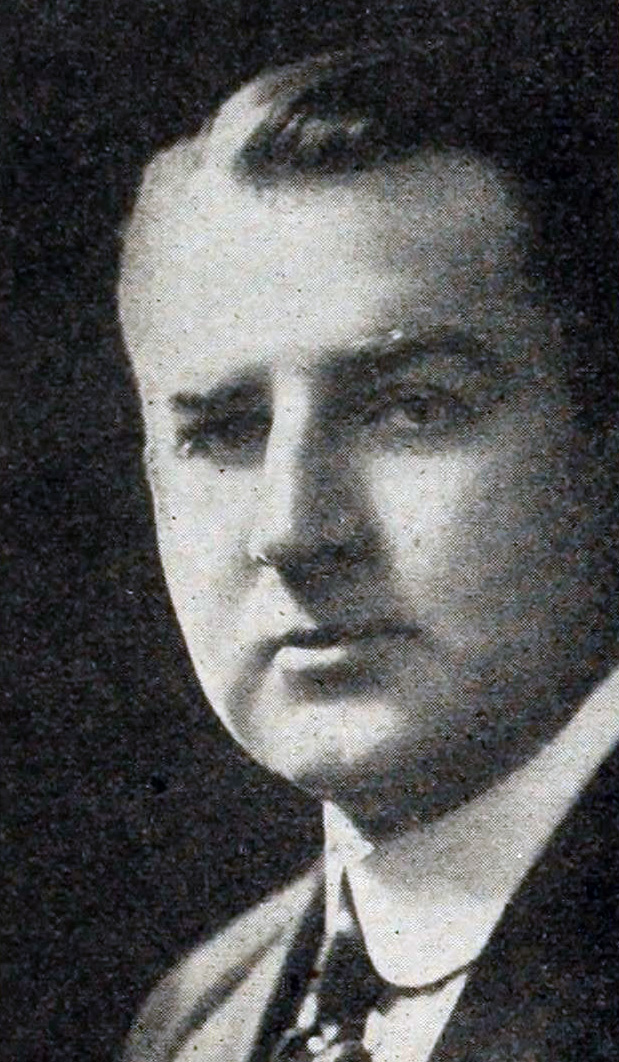
- The Moving Picture World, 1916
- Born: Francis William Powell; May 8, 1877; Hamilton, Ontario
- Died: unknown
- Occupation: Actor-Director-Producer-Screenwriter
- Years active: c. 1897-1920s
- Spouses: Eleanor G. Hicks (m. 1907-div. 1914); Emma H. Miller (m. 1915-div. 1923)
- Children: Frank Baden Powell (son, 1910-1974)

Francis William Powell (May 8, 1877 – unknown) was a Canadian-born American stage and silent film actor, director, producer, and screenwriter who worked predominantly in the United States. He is also credited with "discovering" Theda Bara and casting her in a starring role in the 1915 release A Fool There Was. Her performance in that production, under Powell's direction, quickly earned Bara widespread fame as the film industry's most popular evil seductress or on-screen "vamp".

== Early life and stage career ==
Frank Powell was born in 1877 in Hamilton, Canada, the child of Elizabeth and Francis Powell. According to the 1920 edition of the Motion Picture Studio Directory and Trade Journal, he received part of his education in Cleveland, Ohio, although that publication provides no other information about his schooling or reveals whether his interest in theatre began in that city. However, a 1916 notice in the trade paper Variety does confirm Powell's close and early connection to Cleveland. In an April 26 news item titled "Frank Powell Resting", the widely read publication announces that the 38-year-old director was traveling to Cleveland, "his boyhood home", for a vacation. What is known about Powell's 12-year stage career is that he worked with playwright Kirke La Shelle and performed in at least two major Broadway productions. In 1904 he performed in the play Tit for Tat at the Savoy Theatre, and the next year he both acted in and served as a director for Augustus Thomas's comedy The Education of Mr. Pipp. He then relocated for several years to England, where he directed productions for actress Ellen Terry before returning to North America. In its October 15, 1915 issue, the Austin Statesman and Tribune provides details about the course of Powell's initial stagework with Terry, background that he shared with the newspaper in an interview:

Mr. Powell's stage career started as a stage director for the Frohman production "The Education of Mr. Pipp." He went to England with this play [in 1905], and while there attracted the attention of Ellen Terry, who engaged him to produce some of her most famous successes. He remained with Ellen Terry three years when he became interested in the production of great historical spectacular film dramas. In this work his knowledge of the classical drama and of massive stage classics stood him in good stead. He had become a master of types, costumes, architecture and picturesque backgrounds. In England, he produced such lavish spectacles as "Jane Shore," "Robin Hood" and "King Henry VIII." On his return to New York he produced "The Ghost," "The Corsican" and "The Stain", the latter an American political drama.

== Film ==
In New York in 1909, Powell expanded his career into the rapidly expanding motion picture industry, working initially as an actor and scriptwriter at Biograph Studios. There he also co-directed his first film with D.W. Griffith and demonstrated an adeptness at directing comedies. After directing 63 short films for Biograph, Powell in 1914 journeyed again to Europe, where he joined Pathé Frères as a producer of historical and romantic dramas. Ill health required him to curtail his work for a while, but he used the opportunity to travel around Europe and increase his knowledge of acting types and of costumes and landscapes in various countries. On his return to the United States, Powell in April 1912 was engaged by Powers Motion Pictures, and after being with that company for less than a year, he worked briefly again for Biograph before rejoining Pathé as a director of special features. For the 1914 Pathé film The Taint, he bought a steam locomotive and then destroyed it in a dramatically staged derailment. The stunt did not go as planned. It was reported that the "wild" unmanned engine jumped the tracks and "narrowly missed hitting the platform on which Mr. Powell and his camera were stationed." Fortunately, no one was seriously injured.

Later, as a freelancer, Powell directed the first film made by George Kleine's production company. He was then hired near the end of 1914 by Fox Film Corporation, where he directed two highly popular films starring Theda Bara. The first one, A Fool There Was, was released in January 1915 and made the young actress an international star and gave her the nickname "The Vamp". Often credited with "discovering" Bara, he had cast Bara six months earlier in a very minor role in her onscreen debut for the Pathé drama The Stain. In his 1926 reference A Million and One Nights: A History of the Motion Picture Through 1925, film historian Terry Ramsaye describes Powell's initial casting and promotion of Bara:

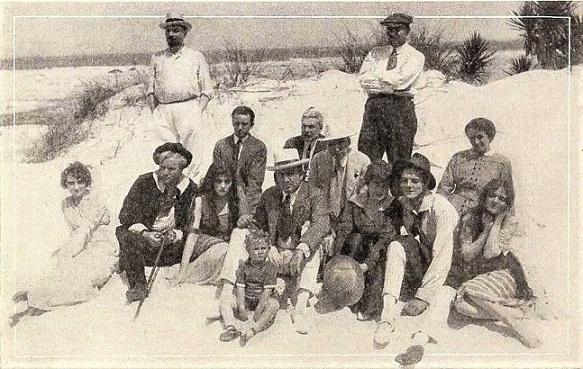
Powell (seated front, white hat) with Theda Bara (long hair, left of Powell) in Florida to film The Devil's Daughter (1915)

While Powell was making The Stain one Miss Theodosia Goodman, of some stage experience under the name De Coppet, applied for a part. Powell was impressed. The next day he took her with the company to work in exteriors at the Petit Trianon, Lake Ronkonkoma, Long Island. Powell pondered deeply. He put her into the background away from the camera. He did not want her recognized and classified as a mere extra. When the casting of A Fool There Was began...Powell...presented the unknown Miss De Coppet. He evolved for her the name Theda Bara under which she was to attain world fame, "Theda" being an obvious contraction of Theodosia, while "Bara" was derived from a relative's name of Barranger.

In addition to working again with Bara on the 1915 Fox five-reeler The Devil's Daughter, Powell directed Mary Pickford in 16 films, as well as other early stars such as Florence Lawrence, Robert Harron, Kate Bruce, Blanche Sweet, Donald Crisp, Henry B. Walthall, and Mabel Normand.

=== Frank Powell Productions ===
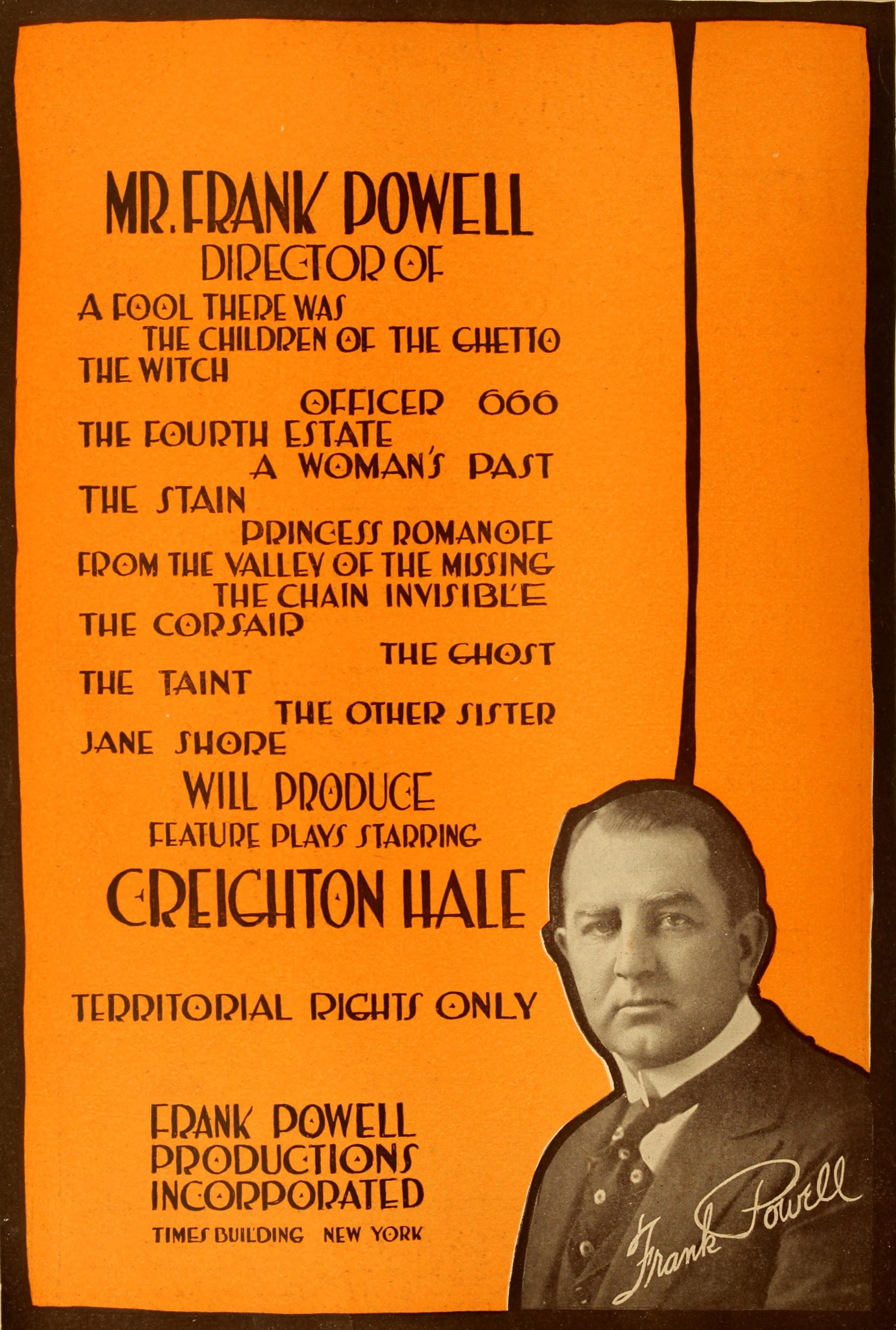
Advertisement for Frank Powell Productions in The Moving Picture World, July 1916

In late 1916, Powell established his own production company and later set up filming and post-production facilities in San Antonio, Texas. One of the films he produced that year was Charity?, which was billed as a "sociological photo-drama" that portrayed the appalling conditions in some New York orphanages. However, after being screened to a private audience, who objected to what they viewed as gross exaggerations in the film, Powell's company decided to make changes to the original print. At the time, the governor of New York, Charles S. Whitman, had commissioned a report on the conditions in private child-caring institutions, so the film may have appeared to be an opportunity to exploit and cash in on those public concerns.

Powell continued to direct films even as he expanded his work as a producer and continued the development of his production facilities in Texas under the name Sunset Pictures Corporation. In 1919 he directed there The Unbroken Promise, a Western starring his wife at the time, Jane Miller. He also continued his work as a "scenarist" or screenwriter, writing a number of scripts for British productions in the early 1920s, including A Soul's Awakening (1921). During the same period, Powell directed some of his last films: a 1921 two-reel short for Paramount and Mack Sennett Comedies, Astray from the Steerage, and a 1922 five-reel crime drama, On Her Honor, starring Marjorie Rambeau as a detective. Powell's work on longer films like On Her Honor continued to impress some reviewers, such as Mary Kelly of The Moving Picture World. In her assessment of that film, Kelly compliments its tone and pacing, describing Powell's direction as "a dignified and restrained treatment of the experiences of a lady detective".

=== Later career ===
Powell's career after 1922 becomes more difficult to trace from available references. His ongoing membership in the Motion Picture Directors Association suggests that he had relocated to Los Angeles, California and was residing there by that year. Although the MPDA continued to be headquartered in New York City, Powell's membership for 1922-1923 is listed as being at the organization's growing West Coast "Lodge" in Hollywood. A film listing in the Exhibitors Herald also places him in Los Angeles in 1923. In its April issue, the trade journal credits Frank Powell as director for a six-reel Western titled Rancher and produced by Phil Goldstone Productions, a Los Angeles company associated with lower-quality releases or "B films". The American Film Institute and other current film references and repositories credit George Elliot with directing Goldstone's 1923 Western, which is cited by a slightly different title, The Ranchers. Since no further news items or reviews in 1923 refer to Frank Powell and his connection to the Western, he may not have been able to complete the project or perhaps Goldstone replaced him with Elliot for some other reason.

== Personal life ==
Powell was married at least twice. In June 1907 in Amherst, Nova Scotia, he wed Iowa native Eleanor G. Hicks, an actress he met while working for the Lyceum Stock Company in New York. He and Eleanor had one son, Frank Baden Powell, who was born in Iowa on June 26, 1910. The couple divorced in 1914, the year before Powell's marriage to Emma H. Miller, another actress who professionally used the name Jane Miller. He and Miller married in Jersey City, New Jersey on October 14, 1915, a few months after Powell cast her in three films he directed that year, first in a starring role in From the Valley of the Missing and then as a supporting player in The Devil's Daughter and The Witch. They remained together for eight years, although they separated temporarily on several occasions before finally divorcing in June 1923. Among the reasons cited by Miller for divorcing Powell were their disputes over his poker playing and lifestyle stresses caused by his deteriorating financial circumstances.

Powell and Miller during their marriage lived in Bayside, New York. On October 30, 1915—just two weeks after the couple wed—The Moving Picture World reports that Powell had bought a "large estate" there and speculates that the impressive Long Island property would be used by the director not only as his residence but also as a venue for filming some of his future screen projects:

Frank Powell, director of photoplays for Fox Film Corporation and known throughout the world as the producer of "A Fool There Was," and other noted film successes, has purchased for an unknown amount, the famous Teller Estate on Bradish Avenue, Bayside Park, Bayside, Long Island. The estate includes a twelve-room house and spacious grounds that are noted for their natural beauty and they will no doubt be utilized by Mr. Powell in many of the feature films he has in course of production. Mr. Powell is remodeling and furnishing the house and under his artistic direction should make his place one of the most noted in Bayside.

== Death ==
The date, exact location, and cause of Powell's death remain uncertain due to the lack of conclusive documentation. The presence of various Frank Powells in historical records in different states, conflicting information in federal indexes, and the ongoing need to find a corroborating obituary in a newspaper or trade publication leave many questions regarding Powell's final years and death unanswered.

== Selected filmography ==
=== Actor ===
- The Friend of the Family' (1909)
- In the Watches of the Night' (1909)
- The Mended Lute (1909)
- With Her Card (1909)
- A Corner in Wheat (1909)
- His Duty (1909)
- In Old California (1910)
- The Impalement (1910)
- The Newlyweds (1910)
- The Man (1910)
- The Rocky Road (1910)
- The Rose of Surrey (1913), as Edmund Grey

=== Director ===
- The Kid (1910)
- May and December (1910)
- Never Again (1910)
- A Gold Necklace (1910)
- The Lucky Toothache (1910)
- Jane Shore (1911)
- Puppets of Fate (1912)
- His Last Dollar (1914)
- Anna Rose (1914)
- The Corsair (1914)
- Officer 666 (1914)
- The Stain (1914)
- The Taint (1914)
- A Fool There Was (1915)
- Children of the Ghetto (1915)
- From the Valley of the Missing (1915)
- The Devil's Daughter (1915)
- Princess Romanoff (1915)
- A Woman's Past (1915)
- Charity? (1916)
- The Chain Invisible (1916)
- The Fourth Estate (1916)
- The Scarlet Oath (1916)
- The Witch (1916)
- Mary Moreland (1917)
- The Dazzling Miss Davison (1917)
- The Final Payment (1917)
- The Mirror (1917)
- Hedda Gabler (1917)
- The Debt (1917)
- Mrs. Balfame (1917)
- Motherhood (1917)
- Heart of the Sunset (1918)
- You Never Know Your Luck (1919)
- The Unbroken Promise (1919)
- The Forfeit (1919)
- Astray from the Steerage (1921)
- On Her Honor (1922)
- Rancher or Ranchers (1923)

=== Producer ===
- Charity (1916)
- Motherhood (1917)
- The Dazzling Miss Davison (1917)
- Hedda Gabler (1917)
- Mrs. Balfame (1917)
- Mary Moreland (1917)
- The Forfeit (1919)

=== Screenwriter ===
- Everybody's Business (1917)
- Enchantment (1920)
- In Full Cry (1921)
- A Soul's Awakening (1922)

== See also ==
- Canadian pioneers in early Hollywood.
