= Hamilton Basso =

Novelist, journalist, editor

Joseph Hamilton Basso
- Born: September 5, 1904; New Orleans, Louisiana, U.S.
- Died: May 13, 1964 (aged 59); Weston, Connecticut, U.S.
- Occupations: Novelist, Journalist
- Known for: The View from Pompey's Head
- Notable work: The View from Pompey's Head, The Light Infantry Ball
- Children: Keith Hamilton Basso
- Awards: Finalist for the 1960 National Book Award

Joseph Hamilton Basso (September 5, 1904 – May 13, 1964) was an American novelist and journalist.

Born in New Orleans, Louisiana, Basso worked as reporter for several newspapers in New Orleans, wrote 11 novels, primarily about the South, and was an associate editor at The New Yorker for more than 20 years. His best-known work was the novel The View from Pompey's Head, a story of a New York City attorney who returns to his Southern hometown in the early 1950s to investigate a mystery surrounding a famous writer. The book spent almost a year on the bestseller lists in 1954 and later was adapted into a motion picture.

== Awards ==
His 1959 novel, The Light Infantry Ball, was a finalist for the 1960 National Book Award. It was a kind of prequel to The View from Pompey's Head, set in the same town, Pompey's Head, South Carolina, during the Civil War era.

Basso died in 1964, at age 59, in Weston, Connecticut.

== Bibliography ==
=== Novels ===
- Relics and Angels (1929)
- Cinnamon Seed (1934)
- In Their Own Image (1935)
- Courthouse Square (1936)
- Days Before Lent (1939)
- Wine of the Country (1941)
- Sun in Capricorn (1942)
- The Greenroom (1949)
- The View from Pompey's Head (1954)
- The Light Infantry Ball (1959)
- A Touch of the Dragon (1964)

=== Nonfiction ===
- Beauregard: The Great Creole (biography) (1933)
- Mainstream (biographical sketches) (1943)
- The World from Jackson Square: A New Orleans Reader (Introduction; edited by Etolia S. Basso) (1948)
- A Quota of Seaweed: Persons and Places in Brazil, Spain, Honduras, Jamaica, Tahiti, and Samoa (travel sketches) (1960)
