= Marjorie Rambeau =

American actress (1889–1970)

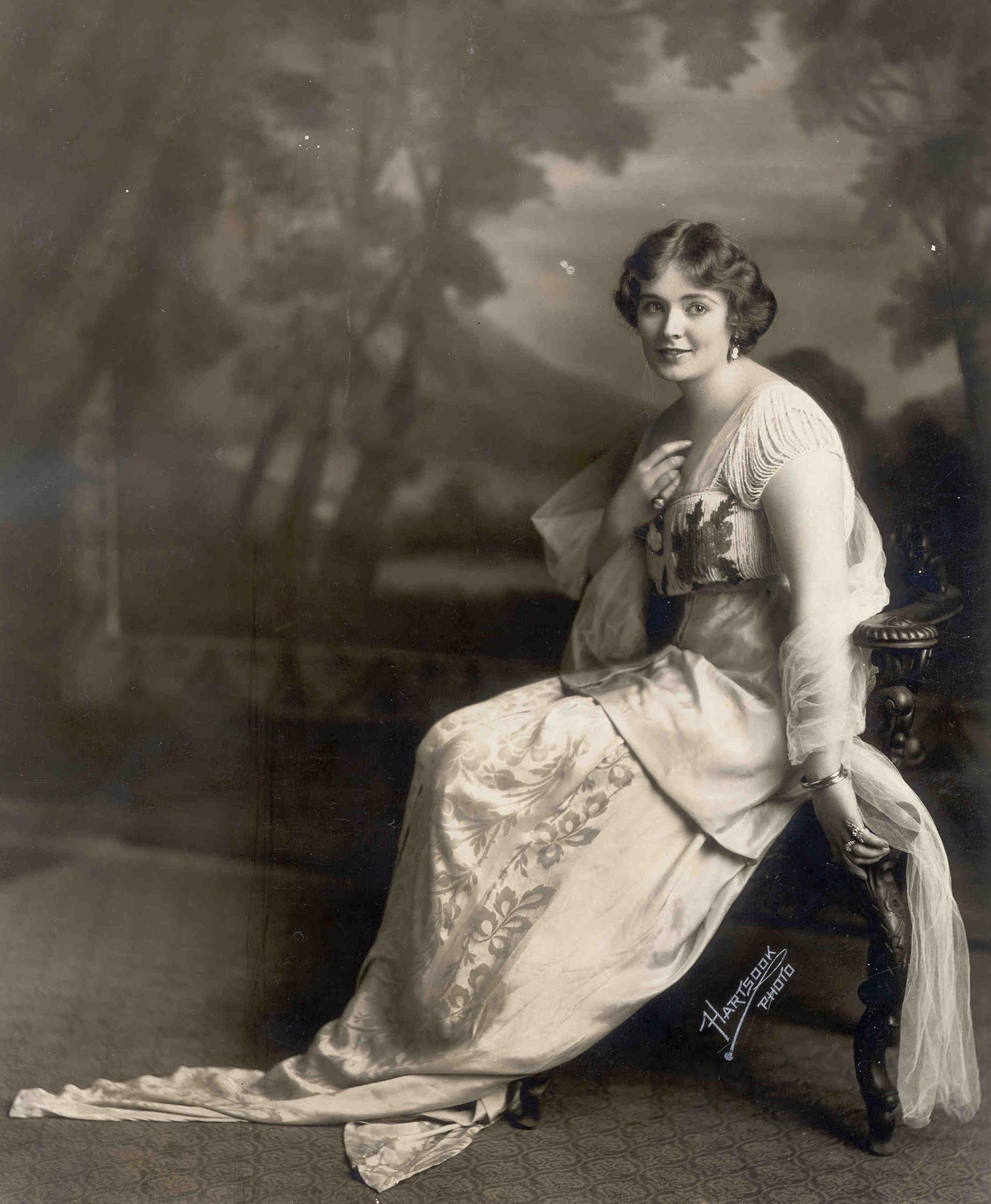
- Rambeau in 1915
- Born: Marjorie Burnet Rambeau; July 15, 1889; San Francisco, California, U.S.
- Died: July 6, 1970 (aged 80); Palm Springs, California, U.S.
- Resting place: Desert Memorial Park, Cathedral City, California
- Other names: Majorie Rambeau; Florence Rambeau
- Occupation: Actress
- Years active: 1901–1957
- Spouses: Willard Mack (m. 1913; div. 1917) Hugh Dillman (m. 1919; div. 1923) Francis A. Gudger (m. 1931; died 1967)

Marjorie Burnet Rambeau (July 15, 1889 – July 6, 1970) was an American film and stage actress. She began her stage career at age 12, and appeared in several silent films before debuting in her first sound film, Her Man (1930). She was twice nominated for the Academy Award for Best Supporting Actress for her roles in Primrose Path (1940) and Torch Song (1953), and received the 1955 National Board of Review Award for Best Supporting Actress for her roles in A Man Called Peter and The View from Pompey's Head.

== Early life ==
Rambeau was born in San Francisco. She had a sister. Her parents separated when she was a child. She and her mother went to Nome, Alaska, where young Marjorie dressed as a boy, sang, and played the banjo in saloons and music halls. Her mother insisted she dress as a boy to thwart amorous attention from drunken grown men in such a wild and woolly outpost as Nome. She began performing on the stage at the age of 12. She attained theatrical experience in a rambling early life as a strolling player. Finally, she made her Broadway debut on March 10, 1913, in a tryout of Willard Mack's play, Kick In.

== Career ==
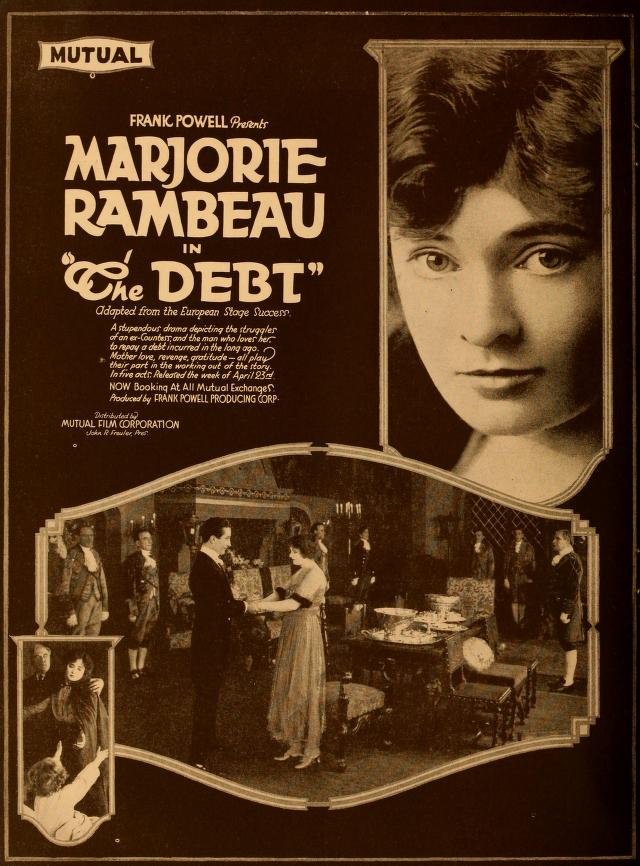
The Debt (1917)

In her youth, she was a Broadway leading lady, starring in plays such as the 1915 comedy Sadie Love. In 1921, Dorothy Parker memorialized her in verse:

If all the tears you shed so lavishly / Were gathered, as they left each brimming eye. / And were collected in a crystal sea, / The envious ocean would curl up and dry— / So awful in its mightiness, that lake, / So fathomless, that clear and salty deep. / For, oh, it seems your gentle heart must break, / To see you weep. ...

Her silent films with the Mutual company included Mary Moreland and The Greater Woman (1917). The films were not major successes, but did expose Rambeau to film audiences. By the time talkies came along, she was in her early 40s and began to take on character roles in films such as Min and Bill (1930), The Secret Six (1931) starring Wallace Beery, Jean Harlow and Clark Gable, Laughing Sinners (1931) with Joan Crawford and Clark Gable, Grand Canary (1934) with Warner Baxter and Madge Evans, Palooka (1934) with Jimmy Durante, and Primrose Path (1940) with Ginger Rogers and Joel McCrea, for which she was nominated for the Academy Award for Best Supporting Actress.

Rambeau played a supporting role in Min and Bill (1930) with Marie Dressler and Wallace Beery. Tugboat Annie was a follow-up to Min and Bill, though it was not a sequel. Rambeau replaced Dressler after her death as Tugboat Annie in the sequel Tugboat Annie Sails Again (1940), also starring Alan Hale Sr., Jane Wyman, Ronald Reagan, and Chill Wills. Also in 1940, she had second billing under Wallace Beery (the co-star of the original Tugboat Annie) in 20 Mule Team; she also played an Italian mother in East of the River with John Garfield and Brenda Marshall. In 1943, she played a supporting role in In Old Oklahoma with John Wayne, Martha Scott, and Gabby Hayes. Her other films included second billing in Tobacco Road (1941) and Broadway (1942) starring George Raft and Pat O'Brien. In 1953, she was again nominated for an Oscar, this time for Torch Song. She appeared in A Man Called Peter with Richard Todd and Jean Peters in 1955. She appeared in a supporting role in Man of a Thousand Faces (1957), a biographical film about the life of Lon Chaney Sr. starring James Cagney as Chaney, although she never worked with the real Chaney in silent films.

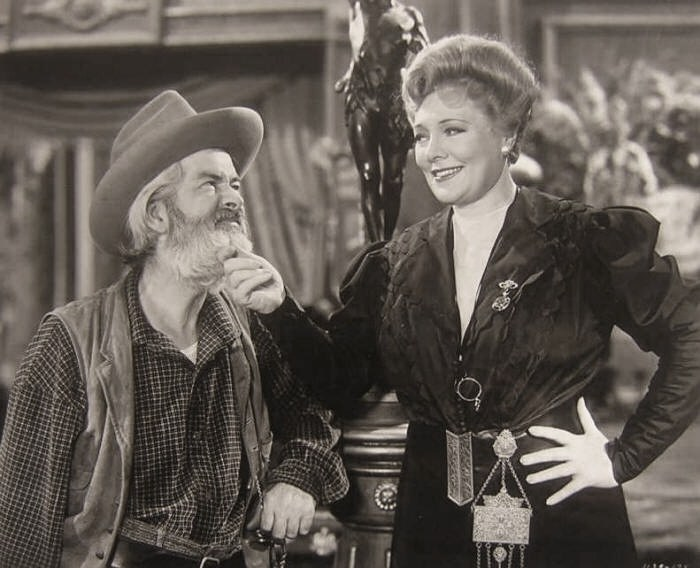
Rambeau with George "Gabby" Hayes in In Old Oklahoma (1943)

For her contribution to the motion picture industry, Rambeau has a star on the Hollywood Walk of Fame at 6336 Hollywood Blvd.

== Legacy ==
Rambeau plays a role in one of the origin stories of the Reuben sandwich. According to author and theatre critic Bernard Sobel, the sandwich was invented for her upon a visit to Reuben's Restaurant and Delicatessen in New York City.

== Personal life ==
Rambeau was descended from colonial immigrant Peter Gunnarsson Rambo, who immigrated in the 1600s from Sweden to New Sweden and served as a justice of the Governor's Council. He was the longest living of the original settlers and became known as the "Father of New Sweden".

Rambeau was married three times and had no children. She was first married in 1913 to Canadian writer, actor, and director Willard Mack. They divorced in 1917. She then married actor Hugh Dillman McGaughey in 1919, a marriage which also ended in divorce in 1923. Rambeau's last marriage was to Francis Asbury Gudger in 1931, with whom she remained until his death in 1967. Gudger was from Asheville, North Carolina. In the winter, they often stayed there, and in the summer, they lived in Sebring, Florida. His previous wife was killed in an automobile accident in Tampa two years before, but Rambeau and Gudger had been sweethearts years before when the former was the "toast of Broadway".

In 1945, a truck struck the automobile Rambeau and her sister were in. Their car slammed into a tree, killing the latter. Rambeau sustained multiple injuries, including crushed legs and a possible skull fracture. Doctors informed her she might never walk again, and she used a wheelchair for a year. Rambeau did recover and successfully returned to acting.

== Death ==
Rambeau died in 1970 at her home in Palm Springs, California, following a long illness. She was 80 years old. She was buried at the Desert Memorial Park in Cathedral City.

== Filmography ==
=== Silent ===
Year	Title	Role	Notes
1917	The Greater Woman	Auriole Praed	Lost film
1917	Motherhood	Louise	Lost film
1917	The Debt	Countess Ann	Lost film
1917	The Mirror	Blanche	Lost film
1917	The Dazzling Miss Davison	Rachel, The Dazzling Miss Davison	Lost film
1917	Mary Moreland	Mary Moreland	Lost film
1917	National Red Cross Pageant	America	Final episode Lost film
1919	The Common Cause	Columbia	Prologue; Lost film
1920	The Fortune Teller	Renee Browning	Lost film
1922	On Her Honor	Rachel Davison	Presumed Lost
1926	Syncopating Sue	Herself	Lost film

=== Sound ===
Year	Title	Role	Notes
1930	Her Man	Annie	
1930	Min and Bill	Bella Pringle	
1930	Great Day		film never completed or released
1931	Inspiration	Lulu	
1931	Trader Horn	Edith Trent	(scenes deleted)
1931	The Easiest Way	Elfie St. Clair	
1931	A Tailor Made Man	Kitty Dupuy	
1931	Strangers May Kiss	Geneva	
1931	The Secret Six	Peaches	
1931	Laughing Sinners	Ruby	
1931	Son of India	Mrs. Darsey	
1931	Silence	Mollie Burke	
1931	This Modern Age	Diane Winters	(scenes deleted)
1931	Left Over Ladies	The Duchess	
1931	Hell Divers	Mame Kelsey	
1933	Strictly Personal	Annie Gibson	
1933	The Warrior's Husband	Hippolyta	
1933	Man's Castle	Flossie	
1934	Palooka	Mayme Palooka	
1934	A Modern Hero	Madame Azais	
1934	Grand Canary	Daisy Hemingway	
1934	Ready for Love	Goldie Tate	
1935	Under Pressure	Amelia "Amy" Hardcastle	
1935	Dizzy Dames	Lillian Bennett / Lillian Marlowe	
1937	First Lady	Belle Hardwick	
1938	Merrily We Live	Mrs. Harlan	
1938	Woman Against Woman	Mrs. Kingsley	
1939	Sudden Money	Elsie Patterson	
1939	The Rains Came	Mrs. Simon	
1939	Heaven with a Barbed Wire Fence	Mamie	
1939	Laugh It Off	Sylvia Swan	
1940	Santa Fe Marshal	Ma Burton	
1940	Primrose Path	Mamie Adams	Nominated for the Academy Award for Best Supporting Actress
1940	20 Mule Team	Josie Johnson	
1940	Tugboat Annie Sails Again	Capt. Annie Brennan	
1940	East of the River	Mama Teresa Lorenzo	
1941	Tobacco Road	Sister Bessie Rice	
1941	Three Sons o' Guns	Aunt Lottie	
1942	Broadway	Lillian "Lil" Rice	
1943	In Old Oklahoma	Bessie Baxter	
1944	Oh, What a Night	Lil Vanderhoven	
1944	Army Wives	Mrs. Shannahan	
1945	Salome, Where She Danced	Madam Europe	
1945	It's Murder, She Says	Anopheles Annie	Short, Voice, Uncredited
1948	The Walls of Jericho	Mrs. Dunham	
1949	The Lucky Stiff	Hattie Hatfield	
1949	Any Number Can Play	Sarah Calbern	
1949	Abandoned	Mrs. Donner	
1953	Torch Song	Mrs. Stewart	Nominated for the Academy Award for Best Supporting Actress
1953	Forever Female	Older Actress at Bar	
1953	Bad for Each Other	Mrs. Roger Nelson	
1955	A Man Called Peter	Miss Laura Fowler	
1955	The View from Pompey's Head	Lucy Devereaux Wales	
1957	Slander	Mrs. Manley	
1957	Man of a Thousand Faces	Gert	(final film role)

== See also ==
- List of actors with Academy Award nominations

== Awards and nominations ==
Year	Organization	Category	Work	Result	Ref.
1941	Academy Awards	Best Supporting Actress	Primrose Path	Nominated	
1954	Academy Awards	Best Supporting Actress	Torch Song	Nominated	
1955	National Board of Review	Best Supporting Actress	A Man Called Peter, The View from Pompey's Head	Won	
1960	Hollywood Walk of Fame	Star - Motion Pictures	—N/a	Honored	
