= Sherlock Holmes (1916 film) =

1916 film by Arthur Berthelet

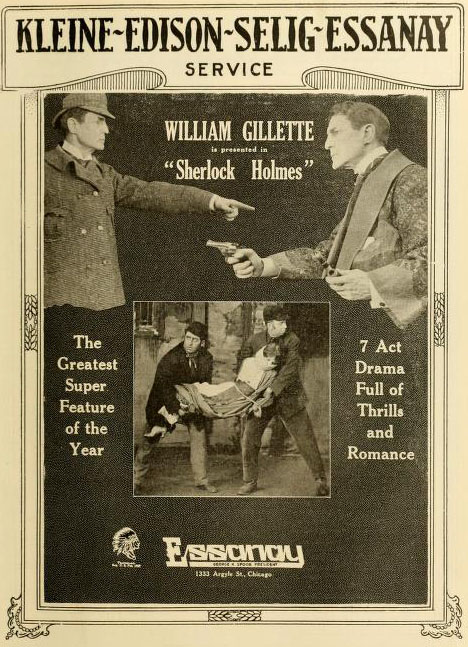
- Ad in Moving Picture World (October 1916)
- Directed by: Arthur Berthelet; William Postance (assistant director)
- Written by: H. S. Sheldon (scenario)
- Based on: Sherlock Holmes by William Gillette Characters by Arthur Conan Doyle
- Starring: William Gillette; Edward Fielding; Ernest Maupain
- Distributed by: Essanay Studios
- Release date: May 15, 1916
- Running time: 116 minutes (7 reels)
- Country: United States
- Language: Silent (English intertitles)
- Budget: $19,000

Sherlock Holmes is a 1916 American 7-reel silent film starring William Gillette as Arthur Conan Doyle's Sherlock Holmes. Directed by Arthur Berthelet, it was produced by Essanay Studios in Chicago. The screenplay was adapted from the 1899 stage play of the same name, which in turn was based on the stories, "A Scandal in Bohemia," "The Final Problem," and A Study in Scarlet by Arthur Conan Doyle.

All surviving prints of the 1916 film Sherlock Holmes were once thought to be lost. However, on October 1, 2014, it was announced that a copy had been discovered in a film archive in France. The film can easily be found online due to its public domain status.

== Plot ==
A prince, the heir apparent to a large empire, was once the lover of Alice Faulkner's sister. During their love affair, he had written some incriminating letters to her. Alice was given these letters for safe keeping on the deathbed of her sister. Count von Stalburg, the prince's assistant, and Sir Edward Palmer, a high British official, have been given the task of negotiating the restitution of the letters to the prince prior to his upcoming marriage.

However, Alice Faulkner is being held captive by the Larrabees, a husband and wife team of crooks who realize the value of the letters and are trying to get them from Alice in order to blackmail the prince. Failing to secure the letters for themselves, they decide to involve Professor Moriarty in the affair. The film unfolds as a battle of wits ensues between Moriarty and Holmes.

Dr. Watson is only marginally involved until the final third. Holmes receives more assistance from an associate named Forman and a young bellboy named Billy.

Full film

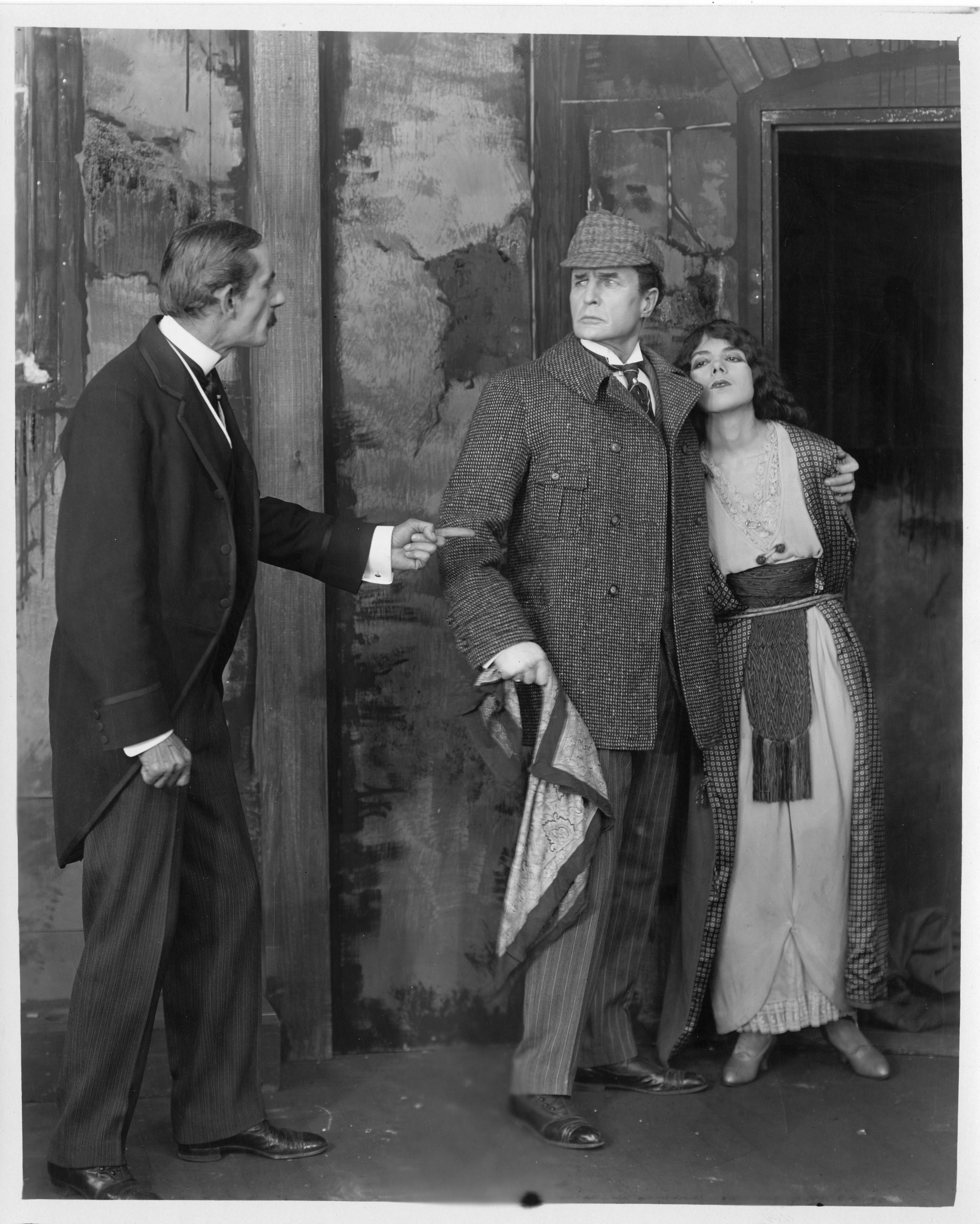
A publicity still of Sherlock Holmes

== Cast ==
- William Gillette as Sherlock Holmes
- Marjorie Kay (Note: A biography of Kay can be found at American Women in World War I) as Alice Faulkner
- Ernest Maupain as Professor Moriarty
- Edward Fielding as Dr. Watson
- Stewart Robbins as Benjamin Forman
- Hugh Thompson as Sir Edward Leighton
- Ludwig Kreiss as Baron von Stalburg
- Mario Majeroni as James Larrabee
- William Postance as Sidney Prince
- Chester Beery as Craigin
- Frank Hamilton as Tim Leary
- Fred Malatesta as "Lightfoot" McTague
- Grace Reals as Madge Larrabee
- Miss Ball as Therese
- Burford Hampden as Billy
- Marian Skinner as A Suffragette (billed as Marion Skinner)
- Edward Arnold as Crippled Henchman In Striped Cap (uncredited)

== Release ==
The film was released in the United States as a seven-reel feature. In 1920, after World War I was over and American films were returning to Western European screens, it was released in France in an expanded nine-reel format, which could be shown as a four-part serial, a popular format at the time. The first episode had three reels while the other three had two reels each.

== Production ==
The film is based on the 1899 stage play Sherlock Holmes. Gillette had played the role of Holmes 1,300 times on stage before it was made into a "moving picture". It was he who was responsible for much of the costume still associated with the character, notably the deerstalker hat and the calabash pipe. Sherlock Holmes is believed to be the only filmed record of his iconic portrayal.

== Preservation ==
Sherlock Holmes had long been considered a lost film. However, on October 1, 2014, the San Francisco Silent Film Festival (SFSFF) and the Cinémathèque Française announced that a print of the film had been found in the Cinémathèque's collection in Paris. The restoration of the film was overseen by SFSFF board president Robert Byrne in collaboration with the Cinémathèque Française. The French premiere of the restored film took place in January 2015; the U.S. premiere followed in May 2015.

The print that was found is a nitrate negative of the nine-reel serial with French-language intertitles that were translated from French back into English by Daniel Gallagher in consultation with William Gillette's original 19th century manuscripts, which are preserved at the Chicago History Museum. The film had been mixed up with other Holmes-related media at the Cinémathèque and had been incorrectly labeled.

== See also ==
- List of rediscovered films
