= William Postance =

Anglo-American actor (1874 – 1953)

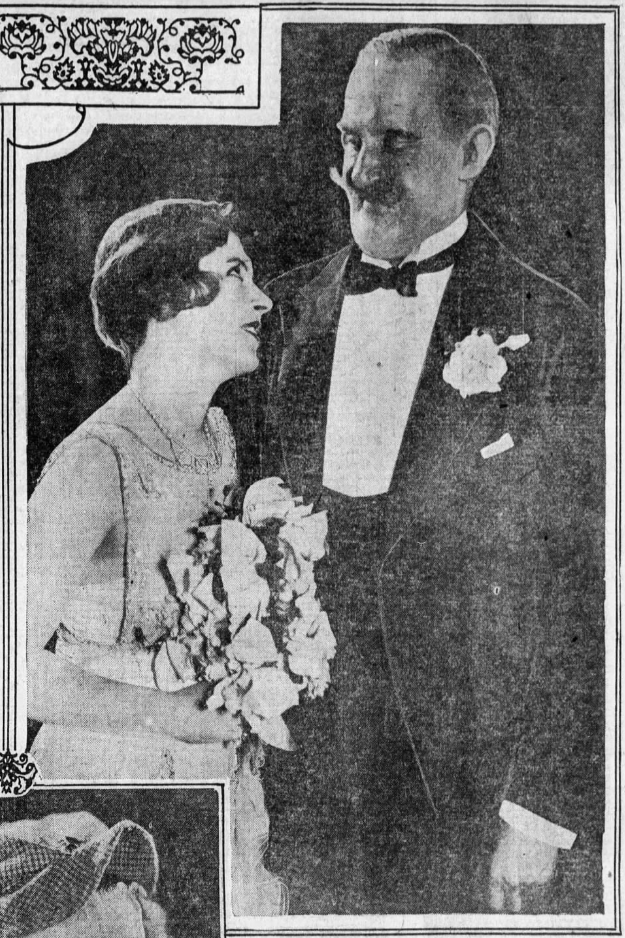
- June Walker and William Postance in Gentlemen Prefer Blondes (1927)
- Born: William Charles Frederick Postance; June 4, 1874; Great Britain
- Died: April 14, 1953 (aged 78); Hoboken, New Jersey, U.S.
- Occupations: Theatre actor; silent film actor; playwright; producer; director

William C. F. Postance (June 4, 1874 – April 14, 1953) was an American and British theatre actor, playwright, producer, director and silent film actor.

== Early life and career ==
William C. F. Postance was born on June 4, 1874, in Great Britain. He worked as a theatre actor, playwright, producer, director and film actor. He started as a 13-year-old call boy at the Garrick Theatre. At the age of 15, Postance worked as a prompter in the production of Diplomacy to Queen Victoria. He joined Olga Nethersole in Sandou's La Tosca.

He worked as William Gillette's personal director for 13 years and worked with him for over 40 years. He helped Gillette prepare the stage adaptation of Sherlock Holmes and directed its London production. He performed before Queen Victoria, Edward VIII, William Ewart Gladstone and Woodrow Wilson. Throughout his career, he was involved in 167 plays. His last stage appearance was The Man Who Came to Dinner in 1940.

== Plays ==
- Diplomacy, as prompter
- The Governor and the Boss (1909), as writer
- Remember the Day
- Criminal At Large
- The Morals of Marcus, as director
- The Richest Girl, as director
- Captain Kid, as director
- Robin Goodfellow, as director
- Carmen, as director
- Camille, as director
- Gentlemen Prefer Blondes (1927), as Sir Francis Beekman
- Sherlock Holmes (1930), as director and as Sidney Prince
- The Admirable Crichton (1931), as director
- Tea for Three (1936), as director

== Films ==
- The Iron Woman (1916)
- Sherlock Holmes (1916), as Sidney Prince

== Personal life ==
Postance died, at the age of 78, on April 14, 1953, at St. Mary's Hospital in Hoboken, New Jersey.
