= Deer stalking =

British term for the stealthy hunting of deer without hounds or horses

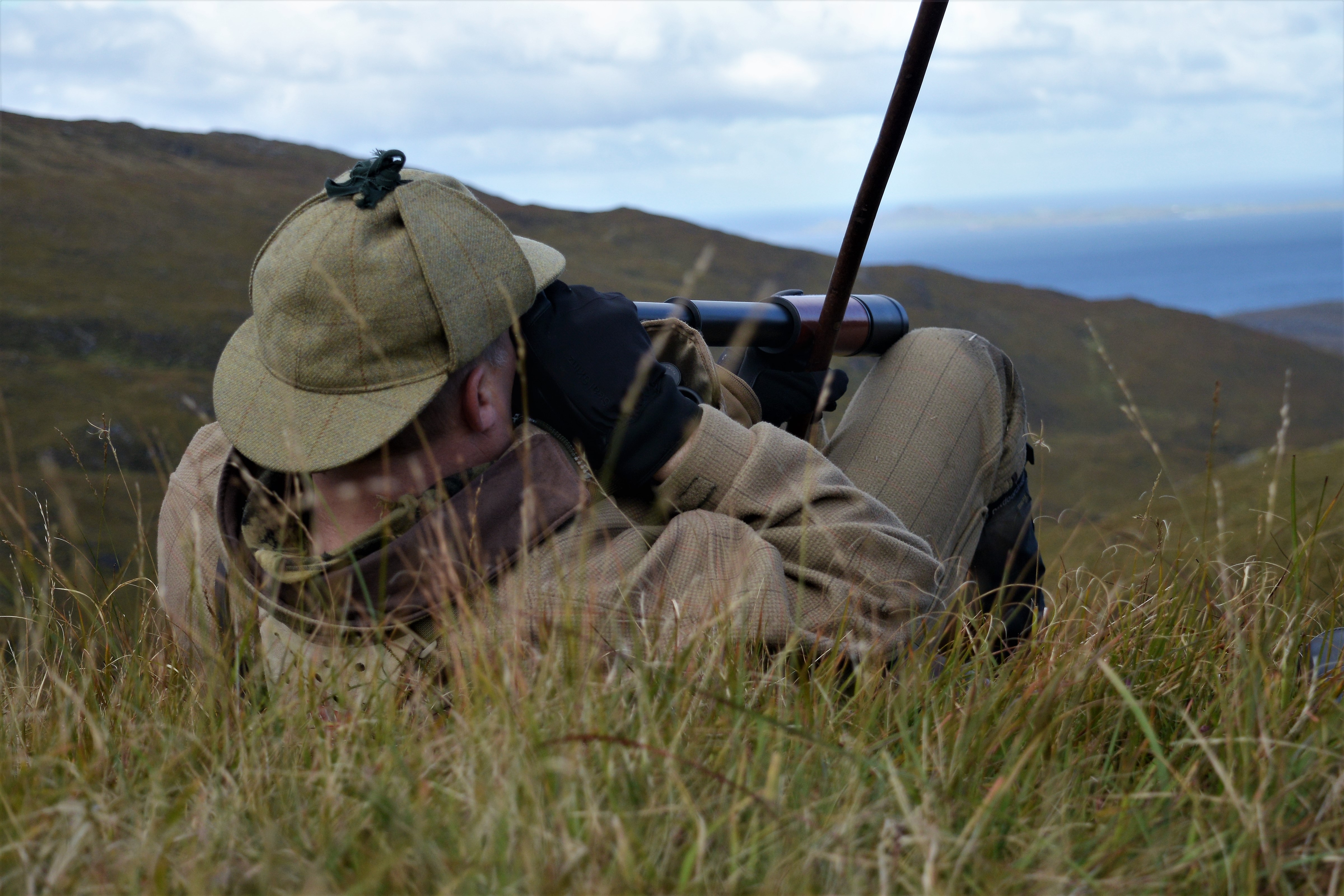
Scottish deer stalker glassing the surroundings with a telescope

Deer stalking, or simply stalking, is a British term for the stealthy pursuit of deer on foot to hunt for venison, for leisure, as trophies, or to control their numbers as part of wildlife management, just as with rabbiting and boar hunting. A game stalker is a sport hunter who approaches close to a timid quarry before making a kill. The skill is found worldwide and is of extremely long-standing.

Deer hunted in the UK are red deer, roe deer, fallow deer, sika deer, muntjac, water deer, and hybrids of these species.

Stalked deer are commonly shot with a bolt action rifle. This may happen on moors, or in woodland. Controls provided by the Game Act apply to deer (from the Deer Act 1991). Venison is also a highly popular meat, with sales quadrupling in the UK in 2014. Prior to the invention of centerfire ammunition, deer were stalked with the aid of a sighthound, such as the Scottish Deerhound. Bowhunting is illegal in the United Kingdom for all animals.

The term deer hunting is used in North America to describe the hunting strategy of deer without using hunting dogs, but in Britain and Ireland, the term generally refers to the pursuit of deer with scent hounds and unarmed pursuers, typically on horseback. The hunter is called a game stalker. The deerstalker hat is a design associated with this style of hunting.

== Background ==
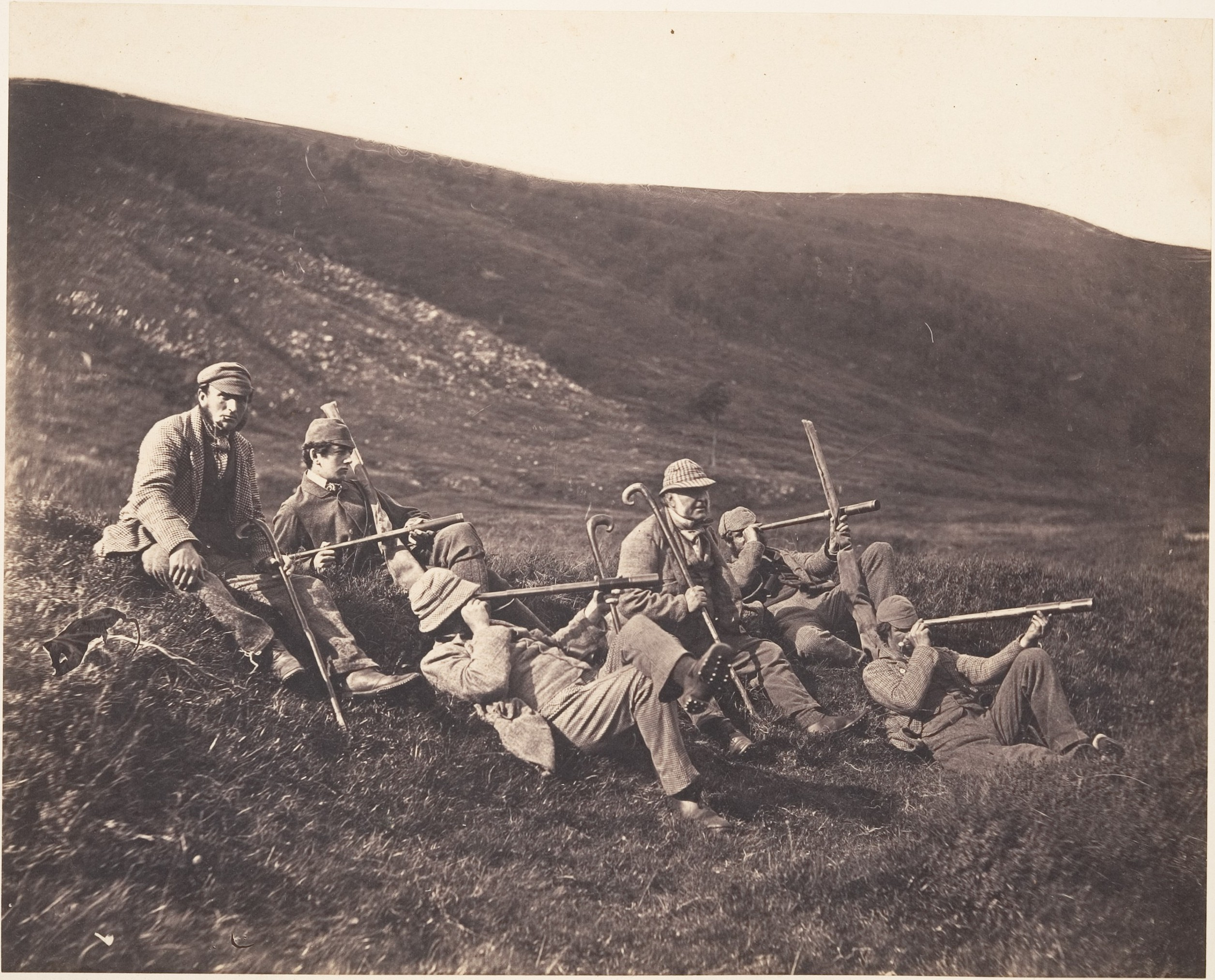
Deer stalkers on Glenfeshie Estate spying with telescopes, ca. 1858

Among hunter-gatherers, where their prey is typically timid, stalking is a way of livelihood in order that they may catch what they hunt. Nowadays, stalking is frequently done for purposes of photography or observation of animal behavior rather than for killing. Stalking is defined as pursuing or approaching stealthily, which is often necessary when approaching wild deer or the high seat overseeing the area where the deer are likely to be passing. Scottish deer stalking is often under the guidance of a professional stalker or a resident expert.

Apart from the stalking of red and sika deer on the open hillsides of Scotland and the English Lake District, which takes place in daylight, most deer stalking takes place in the first and last two hours of daylight. The only historical English county without any wild deer is Middlesex, and in all other English and Scottish counties, as well as most Welsh counties, there are deer populations controlled by deer stalking.

For trophy hunting, antlers are measured by one of several scoring systems used to compare the relative merits of the heads. In Europe, including the UK, the Conseil International du Chasse (CIC) system is used; in America, it is either the Boone & Crockett or the Safari Club International (SCI), and in Australia, it is the Douglas system.

== Purpose ==
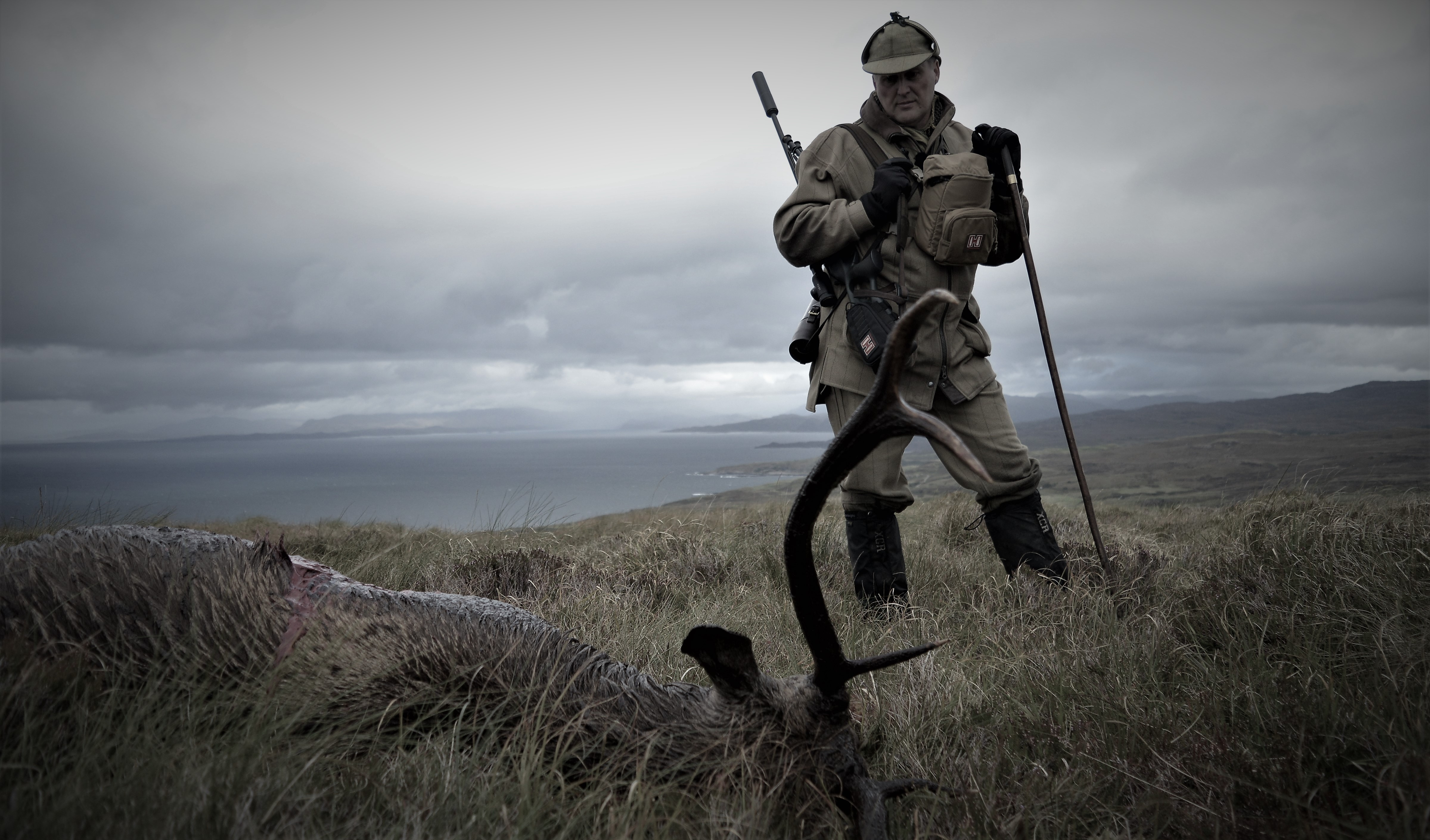
Professional stalker standing next to a red deer stag shot on Ardnamurchan Estate in the Scottish Highlands

There are no natural predators of deer in Britain. Therefore, to maintain a stable population of deer, a cull of some of them is performed each year. Yearly, the deer population is counted to determine the age and sex profile of those to be culled. Barren, genetically odd or very old animals are then killed during the correct deer season. This selection results in a pyramid profile, with a few healthy older animals of each sex at the top and increasing numbers of each sex down to the yearlings at the bottom.

The males with outstanding antlers are sometimes referred to as trophy animals, and as part of the cull they can be shot as part of a purchased sporting package to bring income to help with the management of the deer population as a whole. If population reduction is required, more females will be culled. If a population increase is required, only a select few will be culled.

There are many scenarios that prevent a shot from being taken, such as no safe backstop, no clear shot, the deer does not stop, there are other deer behind the chosen deer, the deer which is visible is out of season, it is not an appropriate animal to cull, or it is a trophy animal which could bring in much-needed funds. As such, not every stalk results in a killed deer.

== Method ==
Most animals are very sensitive to the presence of predators and will escape when perceiving threats within the flight zone. In many cases, the animal's sense of smell is highly developed and can detect anything with an unusual scent, therefore the stalker therefore needs to approach from downwind. Similarly, cryptic care needs to be taken to avoid being seen and heard.

The deerstalker is a type of hat notable for its slight rain-brim to the front and back, with a camouflage checked twill pattern and fold-down earpieces for selective warmth or to raise when listening for deer.
