= Yei Theodora Ozaki =

Translator of Japanese fairy tales (1870–1932)

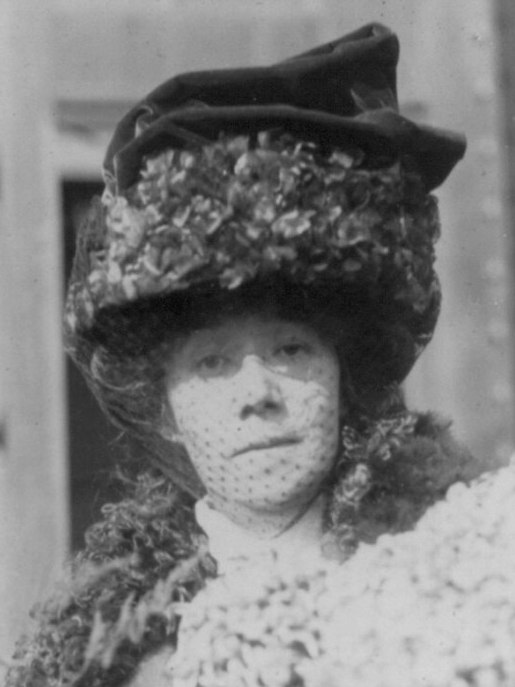
- Born: 1 December 1870; London, England
- Died: 28 December 1932 (aged 61); London, England
- Occupation: Writer
- Known for: Children's fairytales
- Spouse: Yukio Ozaki (m. 1904)

Yei Evelyn Theodora Kate Ozaki (英子 セオドラ 尾崎, Eiko Seodora Ozaki; December 1870 – December 28, 1932) was a Japanese translator of Japanese short stories and fairy tales. Her translations were fairly liberal but have been popular, and were reprinted several times after her death.

== Biography ==
Ozaki was born in London 1871 to Baron Saburō Ozaki, one of the first Japanese men to study in Great Britain, and an English woman, Bathia Catherine Morrison (1843-1936), daughter of William Mason Morrison (1819-1885) and Mary Anne Morrison. Bathia was one of Ozaki's tutors in London, and they married in 1869. According to Mary Fraser, in the extract "A Biographical Sketch", from Warriors of old Japan, and other stories, Bathia lived separately from Ozaki. Bathia gave birth to two further daughters, Masako Maude Mary Harriett Ozaki (b. Jan. 1872) and Kimie Bathia Alexandra Ozaki (1873-1964). Baron Ozaki returned to Japan in 1873 to fulfill an arranged marriage to a Japanese noblewoman, Toda Yae, to continue the upper-class family name of Toda. He eventually moved to a post in Saint Petersburg in an attempt to reconcile with Bathia, who was entered into his family registry (koseki) in 1880, until further issues arose and Bathia returned from Russia in December 1880. They eventually divorced in London, perhaps as Ozaki had fathered multiple children, one with Toda Yae and seven (later totalling 14) with his Japanese mistress Fujiki Michi, creating such a situation as which "her English friends could hardly advise her [to] go."

After the divorce of their parents in 1881, on the suggestion of a friend of Baron Ozaki, all three daughters grew up with Bathia and their English grandparents in St Alban's Cottage, Fulham, London. Yei's grandfather, William, is said to have encouraged her to write in English, which became a mother tongue alongside Japanese. After a spate of missed alimony payments, Yei and Kimie travelled to Tokyo to live with their father in May 1887, with the consent of their mother. Masako stayed in England and married an Englishman in 1906, whilst Kimie later settled in Norway.

Fraser notes that Yei enjoyed the period when she was sent to live with her father in Japan, where she received an education. However, her father expected her to conform to Japanese societal values, and expected also to decide her husband accordingly. However, Yei refused an arranged marriage, left her father's house, and became an English tutor and secretary to earn money. Eventually she made the acquaintance of Mary Fraser, wife of the British diplomat Hugh Fraser, and in 1891 Yei became a secretary at the British Legation. After the death of Hugh Fraser in 1894, she accompanied Mrs Fraser on her travels to Europe, particularly to Italy. Yei returned to Japan in 1899, where Fukuzawa Yukichi arranged for a post as a teacher at Keiō gijuku, and she lived in a Buddhist temple.

Whilst travelling in Italy, Mary's brother Francis M. Crawford, had become aware of Yei's talent for writing and telling stories. Yei, encouraged by the success of a popular Japanese fairy tale series like those of Hasegawa Takejirō, began to write down smaller stories and to translate Japanese fairy tales. Some of these were accepted for publication by English magazines, including The Wide World Magazine, The Girl's Realm of London, and its sister magazine, The Lady's Realm between 1900 and 1902. Her first major work, The Japanese Fairy Book (1903-1908) was published in October 1903, reprinted in 1904, 1906 & 1908, published in London by Kelly & Walsh. As a collection of Japanese fairy tales these were not translated from formal Japanese language, but were reworded by her in everyday language for children, ensuring their popularity in Anglophone countries. In 1908 Kelly & Walsh published Buddha's Crystal and Other Fairy Stories, followed in 1909 by Warriors of Old Japan and Other Stories at Constable in London with an introduction by John Harington Gubbins. Romances of Old Japan, was published in 1919 simultaneously in London and New York.

Beginning when she started her writing career, having frequently traveled back and forth between Japan and Europe via North America as her employment and family duties required, her letters were frequently misdelivered to the unrelated Japanese politician and mayor of Tokyo, Yukio Ozaki, and his to her due to them sharing the same surname. In 1905, they finally met in Tokyo, and soon married and between 1906 and 1912 had three children, Kiyoka, Shinaye and Sōma Yukika (a noted humanitarian and the first Japanese woman to qualify as a simultaneous translator).

Yei suffered a shoulder injury in the early 1930s when travelling to England to visit her family in London. However, Japanese doctors misdiagnosed her case as an accidental fall. In the US, she was instead diagnosed with and treated for a sarcoma, which allowed her to travel again.

She died in London in 1932 and her remains were returned to Japan.

== Works ==
- Japanese Fairy Tales (1908), aka The Japanese Fairy Book (1903)
- Warriors of Old Japan, and Other Stories
- Romances of Old Japan
- Buddha's Crystal and Other Fairy Stories
- "Some Contemporary Japanese Poets" (1920)
