= Yukika Sohma =

Japanese peace activist (1912–2008)

Yukika Sohma (相馬 雪香, Sōma Yukika; 1912 – November 8, 2008) was a Japanese peace activist and scholar who founded the Association for Aid and Relief.

== Life ==
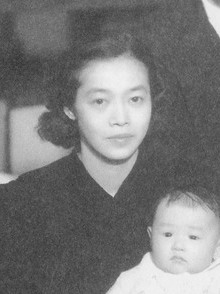
Yukika Sohma

She was born to Yukio Ozaki and Yei Theodora Ozaki. Sohma became the first female qualified in simultaneous translation in Japanese history. In 1979 she established the Association to Aid the Indochinese Refugees, which in 1999 was renamed Association for Aid and Relief.

In 2005, Sohma was named a Nobel Peace Prize 1000 PeaceWomen Across the Globe (PWAG).
