= Yukio Ozaki =

Japanese politician (1858–1954)

- 尾崎 行雄
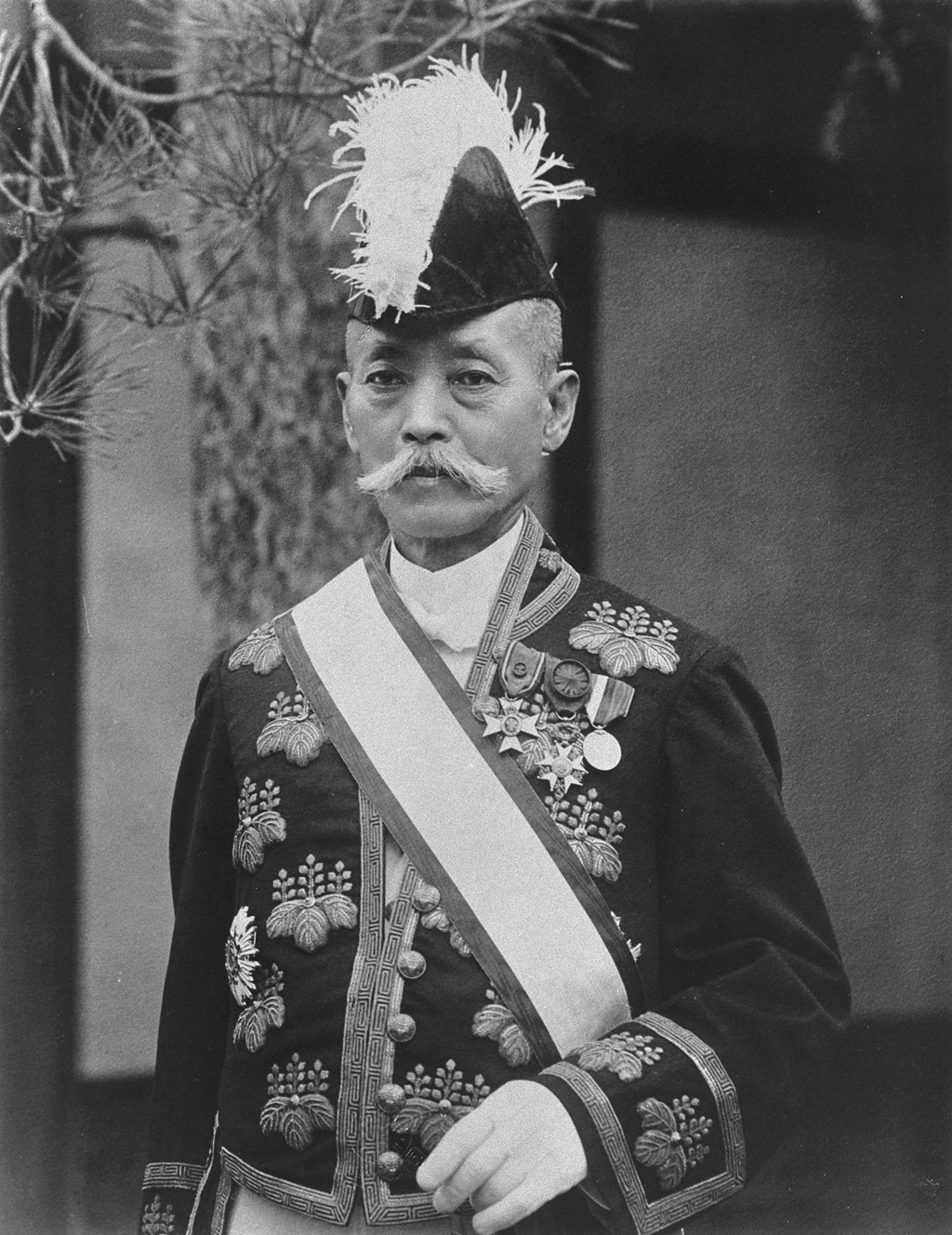

Minister of Justice
- In office 16 April 1914 – 9 October 1916
- Prime Minister: Ōkuma Shigenobu
- Preceded by: Yoshito Okuda
- Succeeded by: Itasu Matsumuro

Mayor of Tokyo
- In office 29 June 1903 – 26 June 1912
- Preceded by: Hideo Matsuda
- Succeeded by: Yoshirō Sakatani

Minister of Education
- In office 30 June 1898 – 27 October 1898
- Prime Minister: Ōkuma Shigenobu
- Preceded by: Toyama Masakazu
- Succeeded by: Inukai Tsuyoshi

Member of the House of Representatives; from Mie
- In office 2 July 1890 – 14 March 1953
- Preceded by: Constituency established
- Succeeded by: Ikusaburō Tanaka
- Constituency: See list: 5th district (1890–1902); Counties district (1902–1920); 8th district (1920–1928); 2nd district (1928–1946); At-large district (1946–1947); 2nd district (1947–1953)

Personal details
- Born: 24 December 1858 Matano, Kanagawa, Japan
- Died: 6 October 1954 (aged 95) Shinjuku, Tokyo, Japan
- Party: Independent (after 1925)
- Other political affiliations: See list: Rikken Kaishintō (1882–1896); Shimpotō (1896–1898); Kenseitō (1898–1900); Kensei Hontō (1900–1908); Yūshinkai (1908–1910); Rikken Seiyūkai (1910–1913); Chūseikai (1913–1916); Kenseikai (1916–1922); Kakushin Club (1922–1925)
- Spouse: Yei Theodora Ozaki (m. 1904; died 1932)
- Children: Yukiteru Ozaki; Yukika Sohma
- Education: Tokyo Imperial University; Keio University

Japanese name
- Kanji: 尾崎 行雄
- Hiragana: おざき ゆきお
Transcriptions
- Romanization: Ozaki Yukio

Yukio Ozaki (尾崎 行雄, Ozaki Yukio; born 24 December 1858 – 6 October 1954) was a Japanese politician of liberal signature, born in modern-day Sagamihara, Kanagawa. Ozaki served in the House of Representatives of the Japanese Diet for 63 years (1890–1953). He is still revered in Japan as the "God of constitutional politics" and the "father of the Japanese Constitution".

== Biography ==
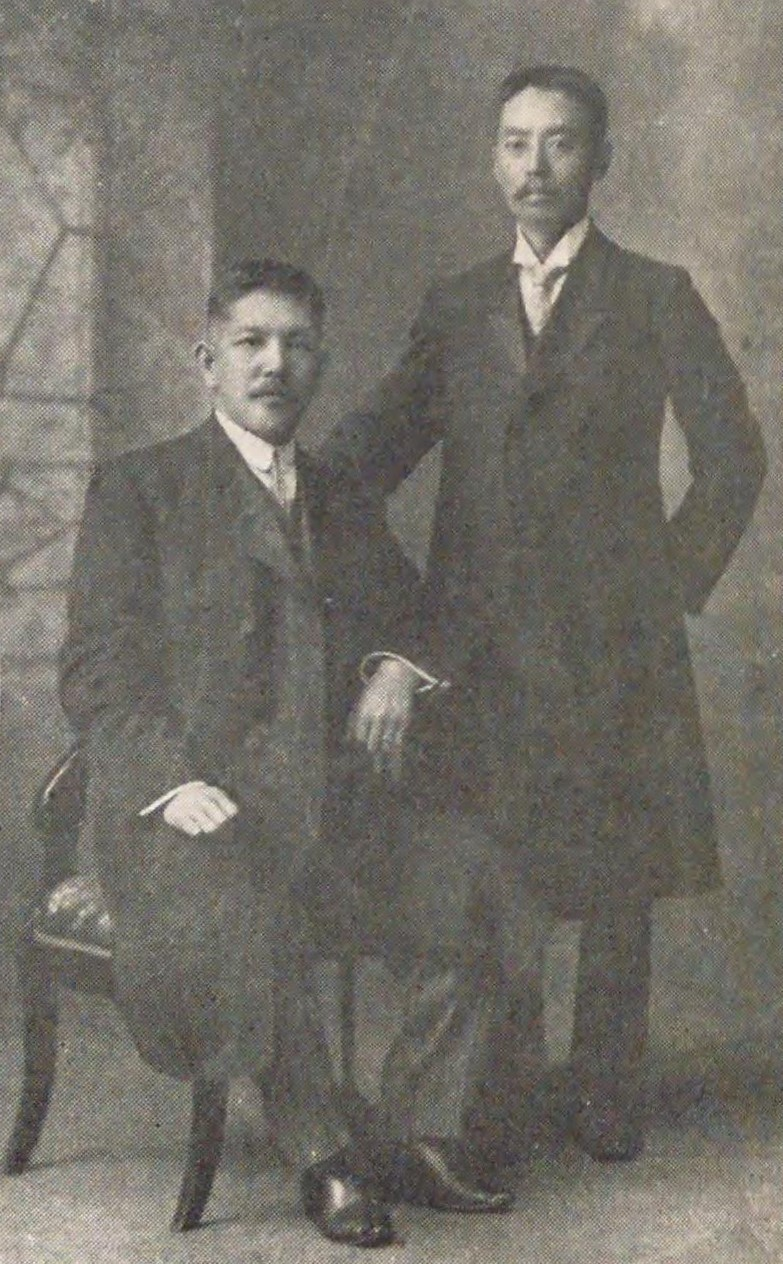
Yukio Ozaki (right) and Mochizuki Keisuke (left)

Ozaki was one of three children of Ozaki Yukimasa and his wife Sadako, who lived in the village of Matano, in the county of Tsukui, in Kanagawa Prefecture, in the Sagami hills, 35 miles west of Edo (present-day Tokyo). The three Ozaki children were born there—Yukio in 1858, Yukitaka Osaki in 1865 and Yukitake in 1866—just as Japan was opening itself up to the western world.

Ozaki began his career as a student at Keio Gijuku, before becoming chief editor of the Niigata Shimbun (Niigata Newspaper) at the age of 20. At 22 he returned to Tokyo and was given an appointment at the Bureau of Statistics. He was elected to the Tokyo Prefectural Assembly in 1885, before being expelled from Tokyo in 1887 for 3 years in accordance with the newly passed Safety Preservation Law.

Yukio and his brother Yukitaka went to the United States in 1888 but Ozaki could not endure the temperature extremes and could not sleep in the heat of New York City and Washington, D.C. He sailed back to Japan via England and was then elected to his first term in the Japanese Imperial Diet. He would serve in that position for more than 62 years, becoming one of history's longest-serving parliamentarians.

In 1890, Ozaki was elected to the First Parliament as a member of the House of Representatives from Mie Prefecture; and he was re-elected 25 times. During these years, he was named to a number of cabinet posts. In 1898 he was Minister of Education, a position which he had to resign due to a speech which conservative elements in the Diet considered to have promoted republicanism; his resignation did not end the crisis, which culminated with the fall of PM Ōkuma Shigenobu and a split in the ruling Kenseitō Party. Later on, in 1914, he was Minister of Justice. He is nicknamed "the god of constitutionalism" (kensei no kami) and "the father of parliamentary government".

He married teacher and folklore author Yei Theodora Ozaki, who was not related to him despite sharing the same surname as her maiden name. For many years, her letters were frequently delivered by mistake to him, and his to her. In 1904, after the death of his first wife, the two met and married. Of the couple's three daughters Yukika Sohma was to become Japan's first female simultaneous English/Japanese translator. She claimed to represent her father's legacy because, she stated, she was only following in her father's footsteps as president of Japan's Association for Aid and Relief (AAR Japan), one of the network of co-laureate organizations honored with the 1997 Nobel Peace Prize.

Ozaki was opposed to militarism and was sometimes confined by the authorities for expressing unpopular views. He could also applaud those whose beliefs differed from his own. For example, in 1921, would-be assassins rushed into his house while he hid in the garden with his daughter, Yukika. The father of one of these dangerous young men later approached Ozaki to apologize in person for the actions of his son. Ozaki immediately responded with a 32-syllable tanka poem, which he handed to the surprised man:

If it was patriotism that drove the young man,
My would-be assassin deserves honor for it.

He was especially active in the struggle for universal suffrage; universal male suffrage was established in 1925. During the 1930s, as an independent politician, he criticised the growing influence of the Japanese military and advocated the vote for women. He was imprisoned during both world wars. Hailed as a political hero after World War II, he was involved in anti-war, World Federalist and pro-democratic activities until his death.

As the second elected Mayor of Tokyo after its administration was separated from the surrounding prefectures, he found himself in an arduous and sometimes disagreeable job—but his determination to make the city better produced noticeable results. Initial infrastructure projects that demanded his attention were wide-ranging: improving water supply and sewage, developing street surfacing, expanding streetcar service, and overseeing gas company mergers. His mayoral position also provided a more ambiguous range of opportunities that included entertaining foreign dignitaries like US Secretary of State William Jennings Bryan and Britain's Field Marshal Lord Kitchener.

In 1910, Prince Iyesato Tokugawa visited Washington, D.C. leading a Japanese delegation that included Mayor Ozaki; this visit was linked to the Japanese gifting of cherry blossom trees to the U.S. Prince Tokugawa introduced Mayor Ozaki to many prominent members of the Japanese American community and to leading U.S. government officials. In 1910, the City of Tokyo gifted 2,000 cherry blossom trees to the City of Washington, D.C., but due to those trees being diseased they had to be destroyed, The City of Tokyo replaced them and presented 3020 cherry tree saplings to the City of Washington, D.C., in 1912. Since that time, Washington's annual display of blooming cherry blossoms can be seen in West Potomac Park surrounding the Tidal Basin, a result of Ozaki's persistence in furthering this project during a time when he was mayor of Tokyo. These flowering trees were the genesis of the continuing National Cherry Blossom Festival in Washington, D.C. and in other states as well.

Ozaki's pen name was Ozaki Gakudo until he relinquished it in 1946 in exchange for "So-tsuō" (meaning "grand old man of 90"), simply because he had attained the age of 90. Starting in 1996, a yearly Gakudo Award has been "presented to individuals or organizations active in issues including the promotion of democracy, disarmament and human rights".

== Honors ==
- Order of the Rising Sun
- Fifty years as Member of the Diet
- Honorary Member of the Diet
- Honorary Citizen of Tokyo
- Special Resolution of the United States Senate

== See also ==
- Peace Preservation Law
- Rikken Kaishintō
- Jokichi Takamine
