= Yukitaka Osaki =

Yukitaka Osaki (1865-1942) was a notable Japanese American figure near the turn of the 20th century and “one of the earliest permanent Japanese residents of Connecticut". Osaki is best remembered for his Japanese political roots and lifelong association with actor William Gillette, the creator of Gillette Castle in Lyme, Connecticut.

== Connecticut Years ==
Born to a prominent Japanese political family, Osaki visited the United States in 1888 and stayed for the rest of his life. His brother and traveling companion, Yukio Ozaki, returned to Japan and later served as Mayor of Tokyo, where he facilitated the gift of Washington, D.C.’s famous Cherry Blossoms.

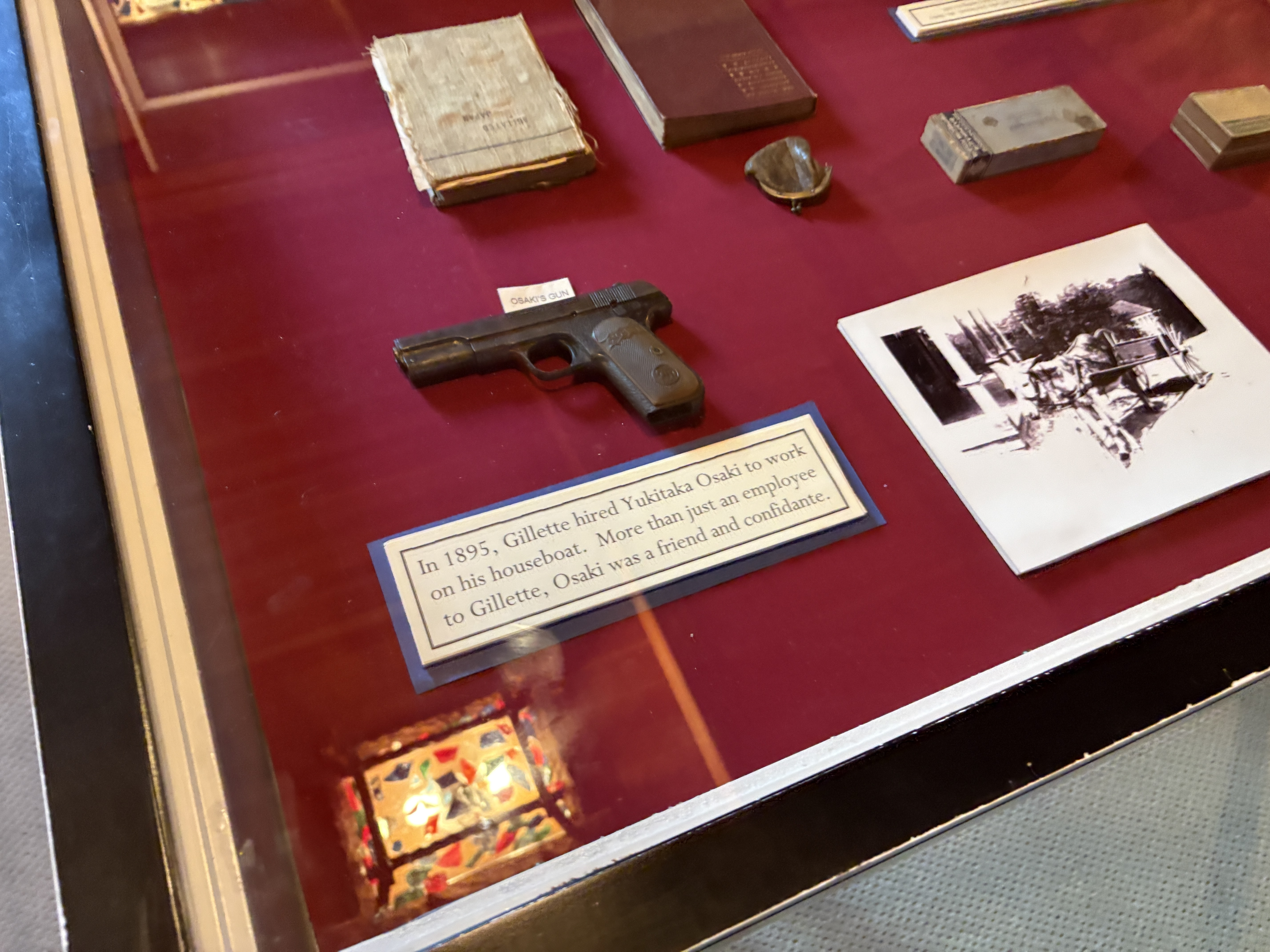
A display at Gillette Castle State Park in Connecticut depicting Yukitaka Osaki's gun and explaining the man's legacy.

According to historian Emma Wiley, Osaki's story "is a unique immigrant experience in a small Connecticut town during the early 20th century," particularly given the "period of increasingly tense foreign relations between the United States and Japan." Osaki befriended the actor William Gillette after coming under his employ. He rose up the ranks of Gillette’s staff, first serving as a steward on Gillette’s various boats and later becoming the “quiet soul” behind Gillette’s empire as a “confidante and friend". Near the end, Gillette devoted a half-hour to Osaki each day, when Osaki would ride up to the castle and discuss his employer’s pressing personal and business affairs.

Whether executing Gillette’s architectural vision for his castle or executing humbler tasks like collecting Gillette’s mail, Osaki cut an unmistakable figure when riding through town on his donkey as a rare Japanese immigrant in the region. Gillette purpose-built a wood and masonry cottage for his friend and personal valet Osaki, who enjoyed a life estate guaranteeing usage of the cottage until his death.

== Legacy ==
Today, Osaki’s cottage remains a portion of Gillette Castle State Park. The cedar-shingled structure may be found on the east bank of the Connecticut River adjacent to the historic Chester-Hadlyme Ferry.

A play entitled “Osaki-San” memorializes his contributions to Connecticut culture.
