= Deerstalker =

Type of cap

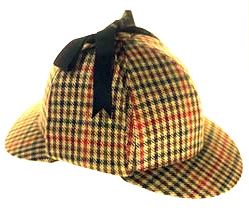
A deerstalker

A deerstalker is a type of cap that is typically worn in English rural areas, often for hunting, especially deer stalking. Because of the cap's popular association with the fictional detective Sherlock Holmes, it has become stereotypical headgear for a detective, especially in comical drawings or cartoons along with farcical plays and films.

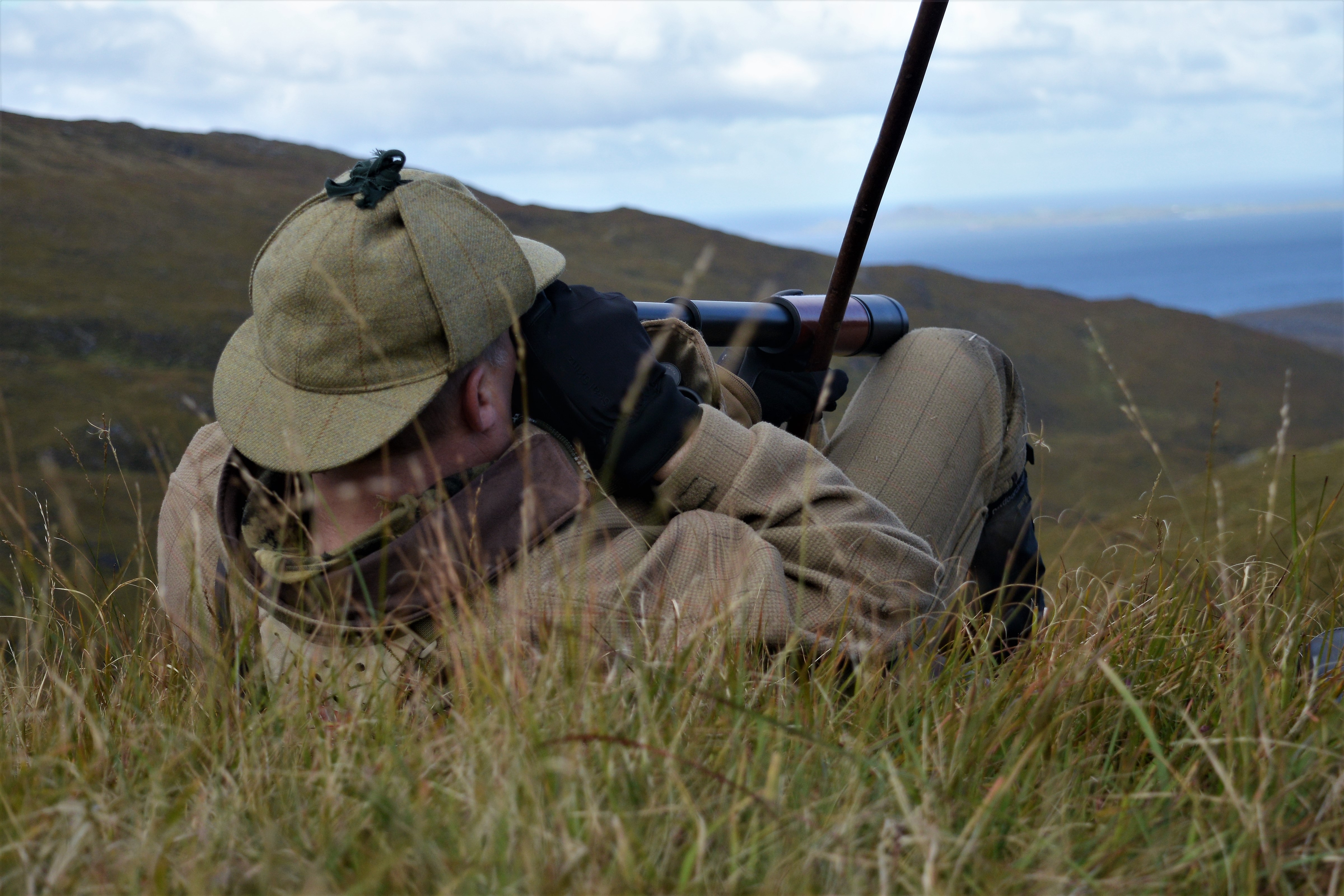
Scottish deer stalker with a deerstalker cap glassing the surroundings with a telescope

== Construction ==
According to Sean M. Wright, writer and member of The Baker Street Irregulars ("The Manor House Case"), who has constructed dozens of them, the deerstalker is most often made of cloth, often light or heavy wool tweed, although deerstalkers made of suede, white cotton duck, and even fur or denim are not unknown. "I even made one for the late Los Angeles attorney Robert Landon Kirste," said Sean, "who asked me to make a deerstalker of black velvet for formal occasions. When I asked if he wanted white ribbon to tie the earflaps, he demurred. 'I don't want to stand out,' he explained.”

The cap is made of six (or eight) triangular panels with rounded sides, which are sewn together. If the sides of the panels are cut in a way giving them slightly rounded shoulders midway, the crown will become more squared and flatter rather than hemispherical. The cap may be deep or shallow, barely touching the tops of the ears, according to the whim of the hatter. Either way, it is usually lined with an inner cap of satin, polished cotton, or similar lining fabrics. Occasionally, one can find a deerstalker with a lightly quilted satin lining.

The deerstalker's defining feature is a pair of semicircular bills or visors worn in front and rear. The dual bills provide protection from the sun for the face and neck of the wearer during extended periods outdoors, such as for hunting or fishing. These are usually stiffened with pasteboard, cardboard, or layers of heavy canvas. For a brief period during the 1970s, some deerstalkers were manufactured with bills stiffened by the steam-cooked and pressure-molded wood-fiber construct called Masonite. The Masonite tended to crack and break into segments, and over time, was also apt to crumble at the corners.

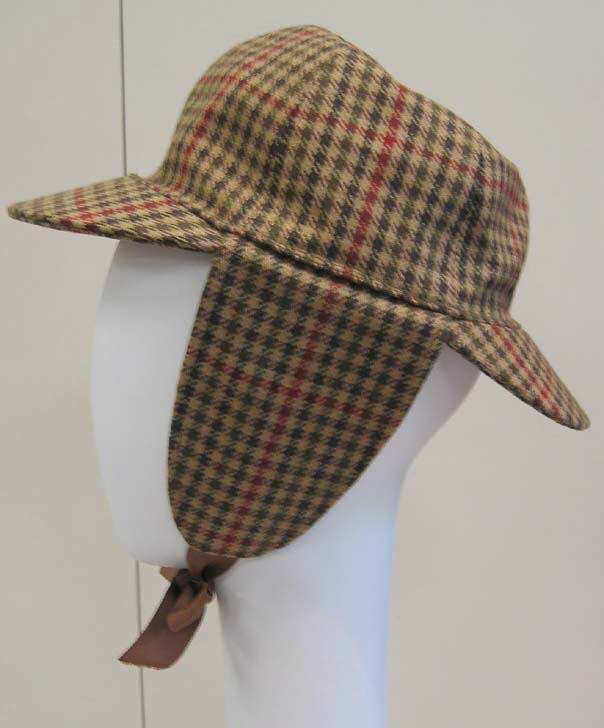
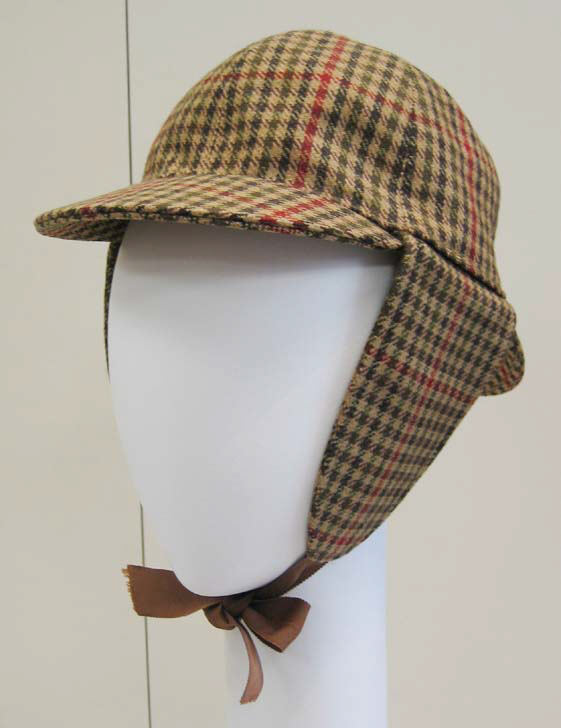
Deerstalker with earflaps unfolded

Along with its visors, a deerstalker often, though not essentially, has a pair of unstiffened cloth earflaps attached to either side of the cap. These are tied together by grosgrain ribbons or by laces or, very occasionally, held together by snaps or a button. The earflaps, tied under the chin, provide protection in cold weather and high winds. They are otherwise tied together above the crown to keep them out of the way.

Deerstalkers may be made of solid-coloured material, but they are most often found with houndstooth check, herringbone, or plaid patterns in the twill of a fabric that serves as camouflage. Modern shooting clothes, including deerstalkers, are often made with either a red-and-black or an orange-and-black check pattern or tweed for both this purpose and hunter safety, not least in actual deer stalking, for which purpose milliners originally constructed this type of cap.

== Variations ==
The "sportsman's deerstalker" is made with a brim around the cap, narrow at the sides, but which may be elongated in front or back, omitting the separate double bills. The earflaps are also eliminated. Some types of this cap sport a hatband fashioned from the same material around the crown. The "flapless" version can be easily folded for convenient carrying.

The variants of the "Irish" style deerstalker are minor but significant. The cap is fronted with a cloth panel instead of the usual seam. The earflaps, wide and triangular in the standard version, are narrow with straight sides. The usual semicircular visors may be replaced by short, rectangular bills. George C. Scott wore this type of deerstalker as a jurist who imagines himself to be Sherlock Holmes in the 1971 film They Might be Giants.

Also, a reversible deerstalker is made that looks like the standard, double-billed model, but it can be turned inside out, revealing an entirely different fabric or even suede, with the contrasting earflaps of the original fabric turned backward and tied together. Other caps with earflaps, e.g. "trapper" and "ushanka", are not considered deerstalkers, as they lack fore and aft symmetrical bills, the defining feature of a deerstalker cap.

== Alternative names ==
The deerstalker cap is also known as a "fore-and-aft" cap in reference to its front and rear bills. This headgear is also called a "tweed helmet", due to its resemblance in design to the balaclava helmet worn by officers in the British army during the Crimean War.

Because the detective is often depicted wearing a deerstalker in books and theatrical and television films, some people call the cap a "Sherlock".

== Sherlock Holmes ==
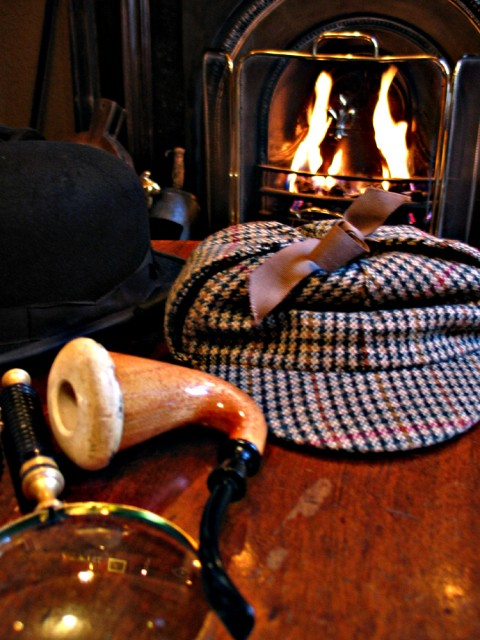
A deerstalker (right) along with a calabash pipe and a magnifying glass, paraphernalia typically associated with Sherlock Holmes

The most famous wearer of a deerstalker is the fictional character Sherlock Holmes, who is popularly depicted as favouring this style of cap. Holmes is never explicitly described as wearing a deerstalker by name in Arthur Conan Doyle's stories, although in "The Adventure of Silver Blaze", the narrator, Dr. Watson, describes him as wearing "his ear-flapped travelling cap", and in "The Boscombe Valley Mystery", as wearing a "close-fitting cloth cap". As the deerstalker is the most typical cap of the period matching both descriptions, not surprisingly, the original illustrations for the stories in Strand Magazine by Sidney Paget (who favored a deerstalker himself) in the United Kingdom. Later, Frederic Dorr Steele, based his depictions of Holmes on stills of the actor William Gillette for Collier's Magazine and other publications in the United States. Gillette, inspired by the Paget illustrations, wore a deerstalker cap in his famous stage play. Other illustrators of the early 20th century began depicting Holmes in a deerstalker, cementing the image in the popular perception.

The cap became so identified with Holmes that he was soon shown wearing it in all settings. Doyle, however, only described his creation wearing the cloth cap when in the countryside. Paget generally followed suit, with the exception of showing him in the deerstalker while staking out his London office in "The Empty House", a detail not supported by Doyle's text. Otherwise, in urban scenes Paget depicted him wearing a black top hat (The Hound of the Baskervilles) or a black bowler ("The Blue Carbuncle"/"The Musgrave Ritual").

== See also ==
- List of hat styles
- List of headgear
- Stormy Kromer cap
