= The Racing Strain =

The Racing Strain may refer to:

- The Racing Strain (1918 film), an American film directed by Emmett J. Flynn
- The Racing Strain (1932 film), an American film directed by Jerome Storm
