= Claire Mersereau =

American actress

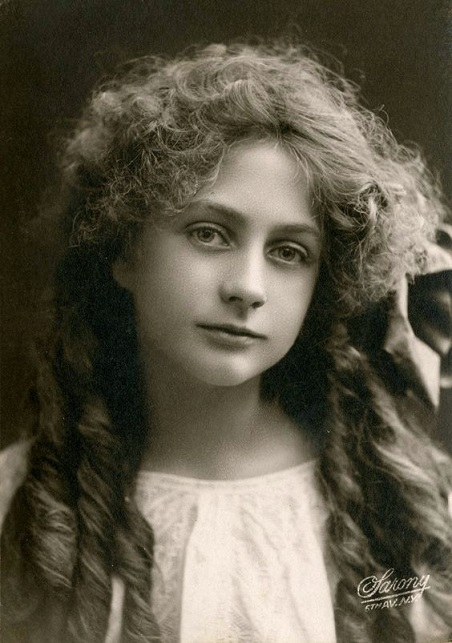
- Mersereau in 1908
- Born: August 25, 1894; New York City, U.S.
- Died: June 26, 1982 (aged 87); San Diego, California, U.S.
- Occupation: Actress
- Years active: 1911–1920 (film)

Claire Mersereau (August 25, 1894 – June 26, 1982) was an American stage and film actress of the silent film era. She appeared several in films including Black is White (1920) directed by Charles Giblyn and played the leading role in a touring production of Polyanna in 1919. She was the sister of actress Violet Mersereau.

== Career ==
Claire Mersereau was born in New York City on August 25, 1894.

In 1904, at the age of twelve, Mersereau performed before King Edward VII and Queen Alexandra in a production of Her Own Way alongside by Maxine Elliott.

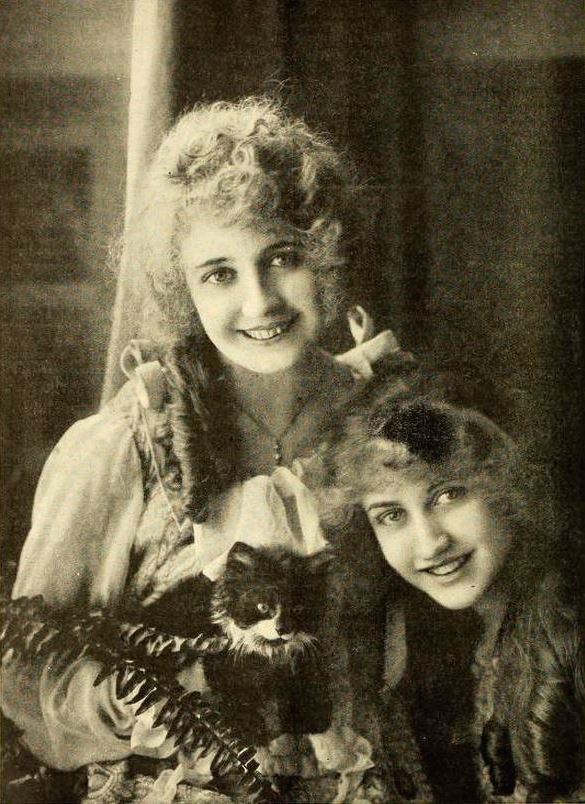
Claire Mersereau (right) with her sister Violet, June 1919.

Mersereau played the titular character in Ashes (1916), a film about a maid in an Alaska boarding-house who inherits a fortune. The film was directed by Robert F. Hill and also starred Nellie Slattery, Stanley Walpole and Joseph Granby. She also appeared with Walpole in The Seeds of Redemption (1917) and The Mantle of Deceit (1916).

Mersereau's final film credit came as Lyda Desmond in Black is White (1920), directed by Charles Giblyn and starring Holmes Herbert, Jack Crosby, Clifford Bruce, and Lillian Lawrence.

Mersereau also had a successful career on stage, appearing in productions of Rebecca of Sunnybrook Farm, Zaza, and The Clansman. In 1919, she played the leading role of Pollyanna Whittier in a touring production of Polyanna, which was adapted for the stage by Catherine Chisholm Cushing from the novel series of the same name by Eleanor H. Porter. Her performance was generally praised by critics, with the Green Bay Press-Gazette writing that "The little star is just a bundle of gladness on the stage and her rare bits of humor frequently brought forth much applause." Pollyanna had previously been played by Helen Hayes and Patricia Collinge. After Mersereau, the role was played by Viola Harper.

On Broadway, Mersereau originated the roles of Countess Ermintrude in Forbidden (1919–1920), Vivienne in Sophie (1920) and Lydia Bertram in George M. Cohan's American Born (1925).

Mersereau died of bronchial pneumonia at Cloisters of Mission Hills in San Diego, California on 26 June 1982.

=== Filmography ===
- Black is White (1920) as Lyda Desmond
- The Seeds of Redemotion (1917) as Rita Ashley
- Ashes (1916) as Ashes Shannon
- The Mantle of Deceit (1916) as Grace
- Right Off the Bat (1915) as Viola Bradley
- When It Strikes Home (1915) as Luculle Gray
- The Avalanche (1915) as Rose Grey
- 'Lizbeth (1913) as Lizbeth
- Those Jersey Cowpunchers (1911; credited as Clara Mersereau)
