= The Kreutzer Sonata (1915 film) =

1915 film

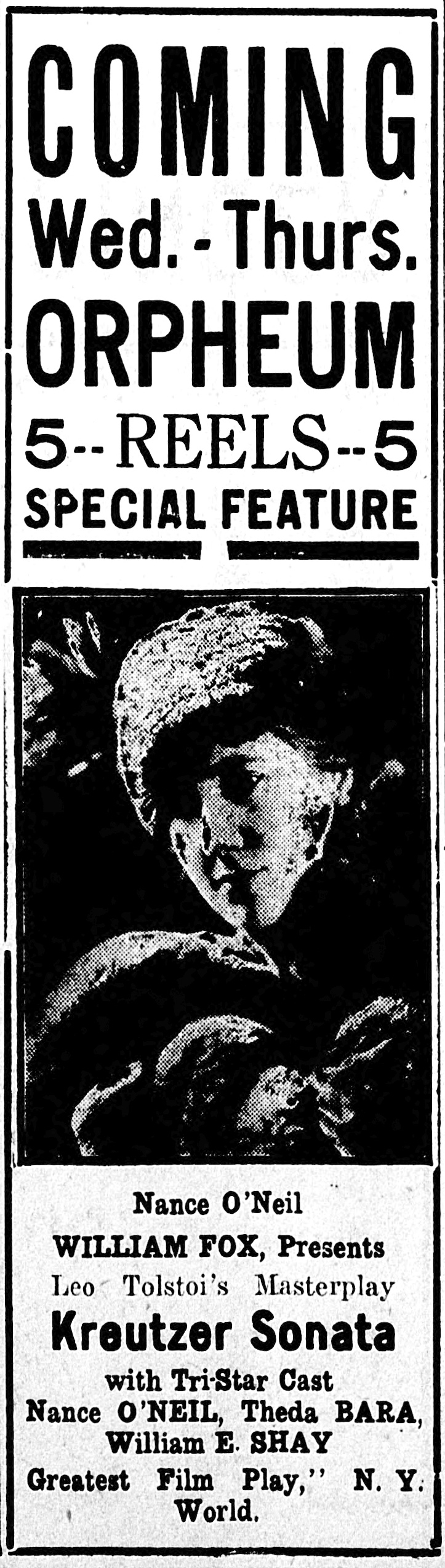
- Newspaper advertisement featuring portrait of Nance O'Neil
- Directed by: Herbert Brenon
- Written by: Herbert Brenon (scenario)
- Based on: The Kreutzer Sonata by Jacob Gordin
- Starring: Nance O'Neil; Theda Bara
- Cinematography: Phil Rosen
- Distributed by: Fox Film Corporation
- Release date: March 1, 1915
- Running time: 5 reels
- Country: United States
- Languages: Silent; English intertitles

The Kreutzer Sonata is a lost 1915 American silent romantic drama film directed by Herbert Brenon and costarring Nance O'Neil, Theda Bara, and William E. Shay. The film was based on the 1902 play of the same name by Jacob Gordin, which was based on Leo Tolstoy's 1889 novella. Produced by Fox Film Corporation, it was shot at the company's studio in Fort Lee, New Jersey.

== Cast ==
- Nance O'Neil as Miriam Friedlander
- Theda Bara as Celia Friedlander
- William E. Shay as Gregor Randar
- Mimi Yvonne
- Henry Bergman as Raphael Friedlander
- Sidney Cushing as G. Belushoff
- Maude Turner Gordon as Rebecca Friedlander
- John Daly Murphy as Sam Friedlander
- Anne Sutherland as Olga Belushoff

== Reception ==
The Kreutzer Sonata was released two months after A Fool There Was, the first film that featured Theda Bara in the role of a femme fatale. Bara later confessed that she did not enjoy filming and was also dissatisfied that Fox had cast her in yet another "vamp" role. Despite Bara's dissatisfaction, she earned mostly good reviews for her performance and the film was a hit.

== See also ==
- 1937 Fox vault fire
