= Breakers Ahead =

1918 film directed by Charles Brabin

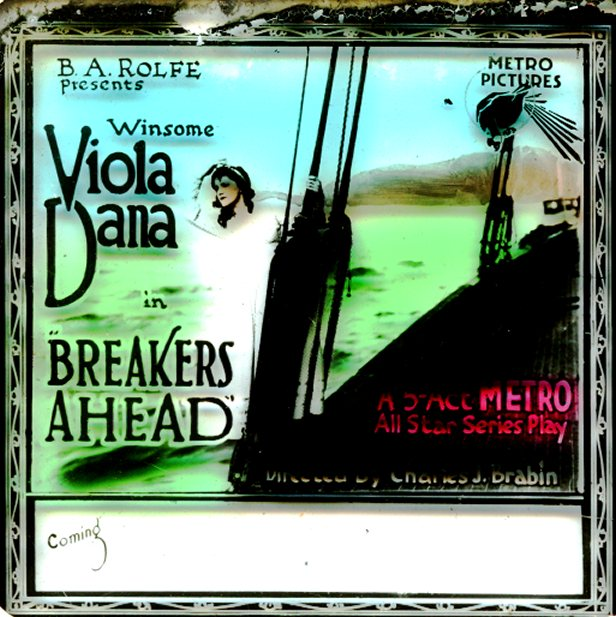
- Lantern slide for film
- Directed by: Charles Brabin
- Written by: H. P. Keeler; Charles Brabin
- Produced by: B. A. Rolfe
- Starring: Viola Dana; Clifford Bruce; Mabel Van Buren
- Cinematography: John Arnold; Robert Kurrle
- Production company: Metro Pictures
- Release date: March 25, 1918 (US)
- Running time: 5 reels
- Country: United States
- Language: English

Breakers Ahead is a 1918 American silent drama film, directed by Charles Brabin. It stars Viola Dana, Clifford Bruce, and Mabel Van Buren, and was released on March 25, 1918.

== Plot ==
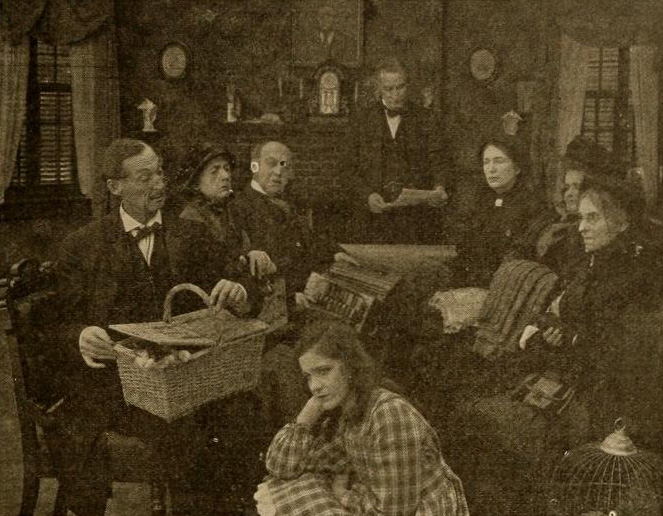
Screen shot from the film

Agnes Bowman is the sweetheart of Captain Scudder, a local seafarer. After he leaves on an extended voyage, Agnes gives birth to a baby girl, Ruth. When Agnes' sister, Agatha is married, the newspapers erroneously state the name of the bride as Agnes. Scudder reads the newspaper account, and heartbroken, decides not to return to his home port.

Ten years later, Agnes dies and Ruth goes to live with her Aunt Agatha in a nearby fishing village, Sandwich. As she grows up she falls in love with Agatha's son, Eric, and he reciprocates those feelings. However, a jealous woman begins to spread the rumor that Ruth is illegitimate, and the villagers begin to shun her. Eric and Ruth plan to marry as soon as Eric becomes the first mate on a ship. Hiram Hawley and his son, Jim, own "The Wasp". They hire Scudder to captain the ship, and Eric as his first mate. However, they plan to destroy the ship in order to collect the insurance money. They ask Scudder to scuttle the ship on the rocks along the coast. When he doesn't go through with it, it is discovered that the Hawley's have hired another crewmember, Mike Burley, as a back-up. However, when Burley tries to run the ship onto the rocks, he is prevented by Eric.

When the ship returns to Sandwich unharmed, the Hawley's fire Scudder and Eric. They then send Burley to set the ship on fire, while it is tied up to the dock. Ruth sees the fire and fears that Eric is aboard. She rushes to the ship and tries to search for him, but succumbs to the smoke. Eric learns that she went aboard, and follows, rescuing her from the flames.

Afterwards, Scudder reveals that he is Ruth's long lost father, and that he and Agnes had indeed been married when she was born. Eric and Ruth get married.

== Cast ==
- Viola Dana as Ruth Bowman
- Clifford Bruce as Eric Pixley
- Mabel Van Buren as Aunt Agatha Pixley
- Russell Simpson as Captain Scudder
- Eugene Pallette as Jim Hawley
- Sydney Deane as Hiram Hawley
- T. H. Gowland as Mike Burley
- Lorena Foster as Eliza, the nurse
- Helen Jerome Eddy as Agnes Bowman

== Production ==
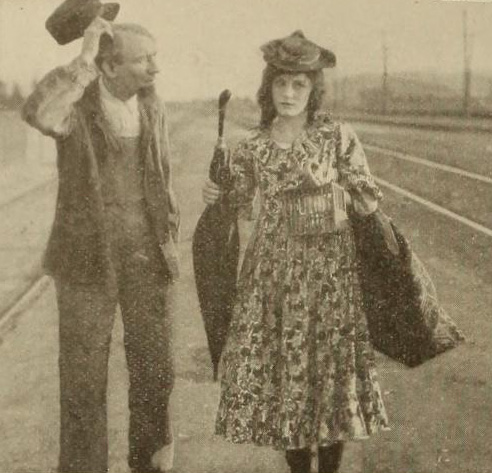
Viola Dana in the film

It was revealed in mid-January 1918 that production on the film would begin before the end of the month. Viola Dan was picked to star, and Charles J. Bralin to direct. Also announced was that Clifford Bruce and Russell Simpson would have major roles. Charles Brabin and his assistant director, Edward Biby, began pre-production in mid-January by developing the sets and selecting the locations for exterior scenes. Mabel Van Buren was added to the cast the first week in February. A special set was being constructed along the coast to film the burning of a ship. Those coast scenes were filmed outside San Francisco, and included over a thousand pounds of explosives being ignited. In mid-February other cast members were revealed: T.H. Gibson-Gowland, Eugene Pallette, Sydney Deane, Lorena Foster, and Helen Jerome Eddy. Following the three days of filming at sea, Dana complained about how long it was taking her to get her "land-legs" back, due to the extreme rocking and rolling of the ship while they were on board. Dana's role called for her to play the same character from a child of ten through adulthood. Dana was so convincing in the 10 year old aspect, that one day as she attempted to enter the studio in her persona, she was refused entry by a security guard who failed to recognize her, thinking she was simply another of the young children who were always around the studio gate.

During the location filming at sea, the production was beset with issues deriving from the United States being on a war footing. One incident occurred when the tugboat they had hired to ferry them to and from the seacraft where they were filming was returning at night with all its lights at full blast. Suddenly a shot was fired across their bow, forcing them to stop, whereupon they were confronted by a coast guard vessel telling them that they were in violation of the wartime regulations, and that virtually every gun in the bay was targeted on them. They produced the permit they had been given by General Murray, after which they were allowed to go on their way. A second incident occurred as the tug was taking them out to their locations. Steaming in a heavy fog, they suddenly saw a mine directly in front of them. They reversed their engines in an attempt to avoid the mine, but their momentum carried them directly to the dangerous object, which they impacted to everyone's horror. Fortunately, they learned later, that it was not a contact mine, but an electronic mine, which had to be detonated from the nearby fort. The picture finished filming the final scenes the last week in February. Some of the last scenes to be filmed were the burning of a ship. They were shot on the Metro lot. Due to a recent fire at another studio, Hollywood fire marshals urged Metro producers to be especially careful. Nearby sets were hosed down with water, and as the filming started and the specially constructed ship set was set alight, half a dozen fire crews were on standby, and turned their hoses on the conflagration as soon as the filming stopped. The shots were a success, and no other structures were damaged. Post-production on the film was completed by mid-March, and the film was released on March 25, 1918.

== Reception ==
Exhibitors Herald gave the film a mediocre review. While the enjoyed the performance of Viola Dana, and the cinematography, particularly the exterior scenes of the fishing village, the found the story lacking. Moving Picture World also gave the picture a lukewarm review. They enjoyed Dana's performance, and also gave praise for the work of Bruce and Van Buren, with particular accolades for Simpson. They were also highly complimentary of the cinematography. However they found the story a bit spotty, without a clear plot at times. They also found the tempo of the early part of the film to be slow.
