= The Dark Star (1919 film) =

1919 lost silent film directed by Allan Dwan

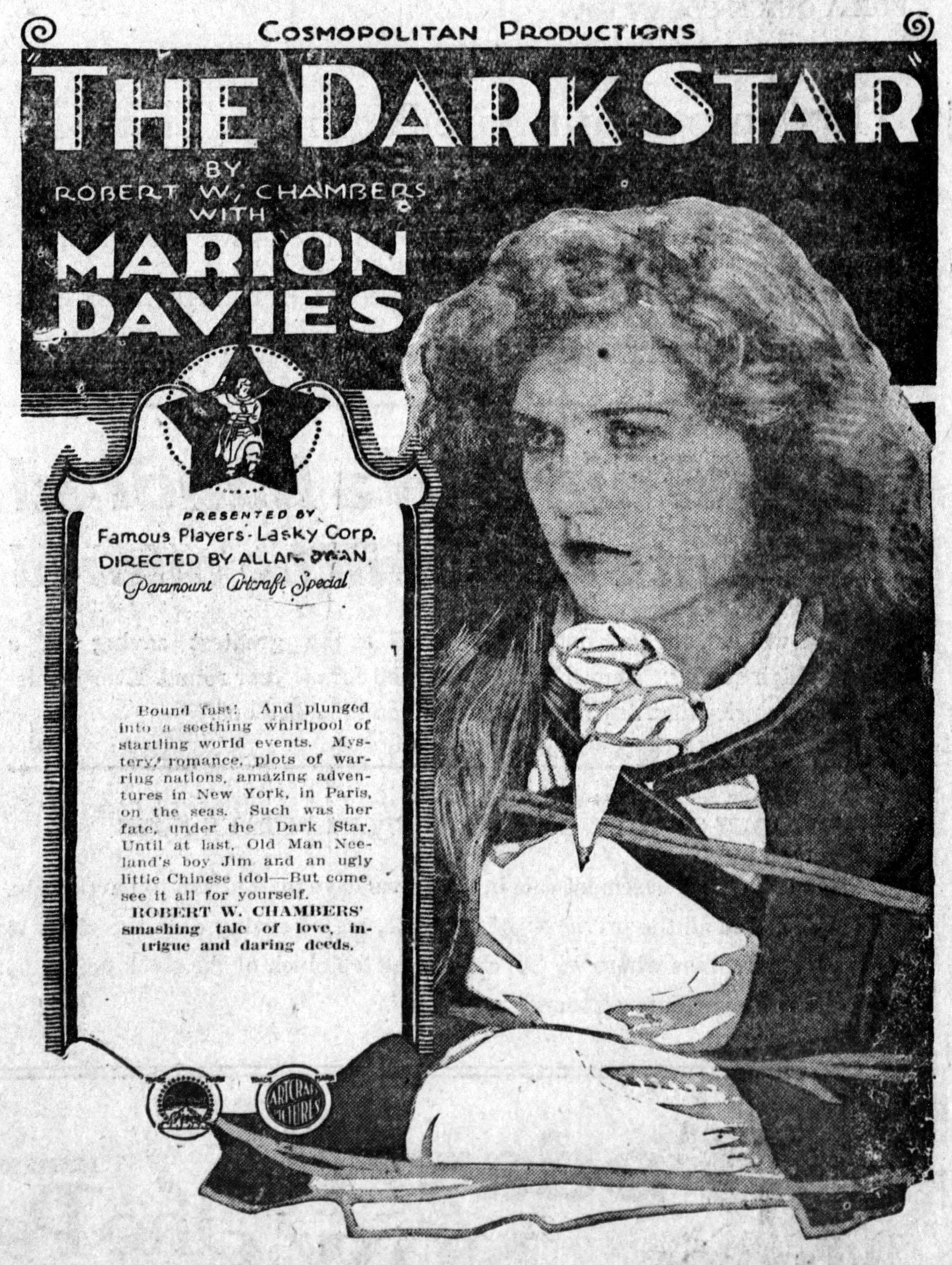
- Newspaper advertisement
- Directed by: Allan Dwan
- Written by: Frances Marion
- Based on: novel The Dark Star by Robert W. Chambers c.1917
- Produced by: William Randolph Hearst
- Starring: Marion Davies
- Cinematography: Edward Broening
- Distributed by: Famous Players–Lasky; Paramount Pictures
- Release date: August 3, 1919
- Running time: 7 reels
- Country: USA
- Language: Silent (English titles)

The Dark Star is a lost 1919 silent film adventure directed by Allan Dwan and starring Marion Davies. It was based on the 1917 novel by Robert W. Chambers and produced by Cosmopolitan Productions. It was released through Paramount Pictures.

== Cast ==
- Marion Davies – Rue Carew
- Dorothy Green – Princess Naia
- Norman Kerry – Jim Neeland
- Matt Moore – Prince Alak
- Ward Crane – French Secret Service Agent
- George Cooper – Mr. Brandes
- Arthur Earle – Mr. Stull
- Gustav von Seyffertitz (*billed G. Butler Clonbough) – German Spy
- Emil Hoch – Steward
- Fred Hearn – Rev. William Carew
- James Laffey – Ship Captain
- William Brotherhood – Steward
- Eddie Sturgis – 'Parson' Smalley

== Production ==
Marion Davies re-teamed with Norman Kerry and Matt Moore in her sixth film. Directed by Allan Dwan, this was the first film released under the banner of Cosmopolitan Productions.
