= The Fall of the Romanoffs =

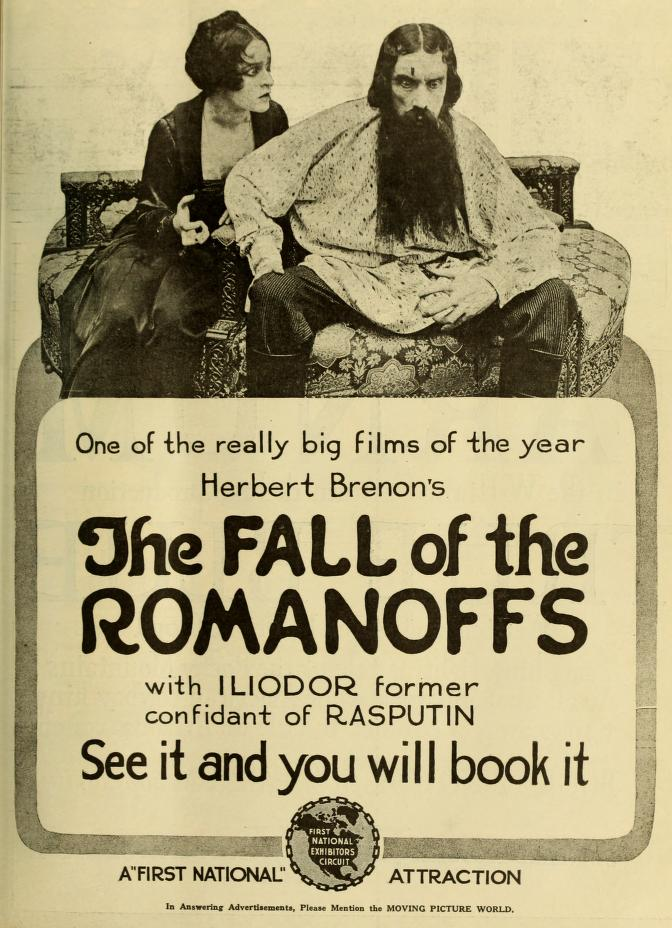
- Promotion in Moving Picture World, May 1918
- Directed by: Herbert Brenon
- Written by: Van Wyck Brooks; George Edwardes-Hall; Austin Strong; Iliodor (book)
- Produced by: Herbert Brenon
- Starring: Alfred Hickman; Nance O'Neil; Edward Connelly; Iliodor
- Music by: James C. Bradford
- Distributed by: First National Pictures
- Release dates: September 23, 1917 (New York City); January 1918 (General release)
- Running time: 8 reels (approximately 80 minutes)
- Country: United States
- Language: Silent (English intertitles)
- Budget: $250,000

The Fall of the Romanoffs is a 1917 silent American historical drama film directed by Herbert Brenon. It was released only seven months after the abdication of Tsar Nicholas II in February 1917. This film is notable for starring Rasputin's rival, the monk Iliodor, as himself. Costars Nance O'Neil and Alfred Hickman were married from 1916 to Hickman's death in 1931. The film was shot in North Bergen, New Jersey, nearby Fort Lee, New Jersey, where many early film studios in America's first motion picture industry were based at the beginning of the 20th century.

This film is currently presumed to be lost. The Library of Congress includes it among the National Film Preservation Board's updated 2019 list of "7,200 Lost U.S. Silent Feature Films" produced between 1912 and 1929.

== Plot ==
The film takes place during the final days of Rasputin's influence on the Imperial Family shortly before the Russian Revolution.

== Cast ==
- Alfred Hickman as Tsar Nicholas II
- Nance O'Neil as Empress Alexandra
- Edward Connelly as Rasputin
- Sergei Trufanov as Himself
- Charles Edward Russell as Himself
- Conway Tearle as Prince Felix Yussepov
- Charles Craig as Grand Duke Nicholas
- Georges Deneubourg as Kaiser Wilhelm II
- Robert Paton Gibbs as Baron Frederick
- William E. Shay as Theofan
- Lawrence Johnson as The Infant Czarevitch
- W. Francis Chapin as Alexander Kerensky
- Peter Barbierre as General Korniloff
- Ketty Galanta as Anna Vyrubova
- Pauline Curley as Princess Irena
- Sonia Marcelle as Sonia

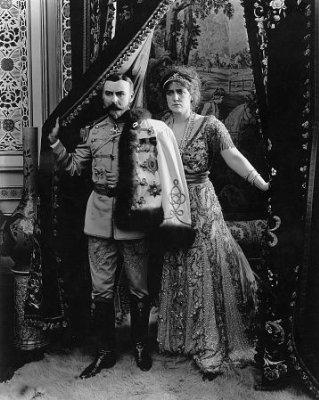
Alfred Hickman and Nance O'Neil as Nicholas and Alexandra

== Production ==
Defrocked monk Iliodor (Trufanov), who left Russia in 1914, played himself in the film, while Nance O'Neil was cast as the czarina due to her resemblance of Empress Alexandra. Director Brenon edited the film during production, allowing it to premiere at the Ritz-Carlton Hotel in New York City on September 6, 1917, which was just days after filming ended. To keep the film current with events in Russia, Brenon continued to edit and add footage through October 1918 to include scenes of the czar's execution and the death of the czarina.

== Reception ==
Like many American films of the time, The Fall of the Romanoffs was subject to cuts by city and state film censorship boards. For example, the Chicago Board of Censors cut, in Reel 4, the two intertitles "Come, let us sin together so that we may pray together" and "Be comforted, my child" etc., two struggle scenes between Rasputin and Sonia, Rasputin carrying unconscious young woman into other room, Rasputin drawing Sonia towards him, Sonia coming out of room into which Rasputin carried her, closeups of Sonia at couch registering emotion and shame, near view of Sonia kneeling before Iliodor, Reel 5, the two intertitles "A fearful thought" and "Who is the woman?", Reel 6, the two intertitles "Anna weary of her inconstant paramour" etc. and "Bring her to my level", and all scenes of Rasputin in sleeping young woman's room except where he enters and scene showing young woman climbing out window.
