= A Woman's Past =

1915 film by Frank Powell

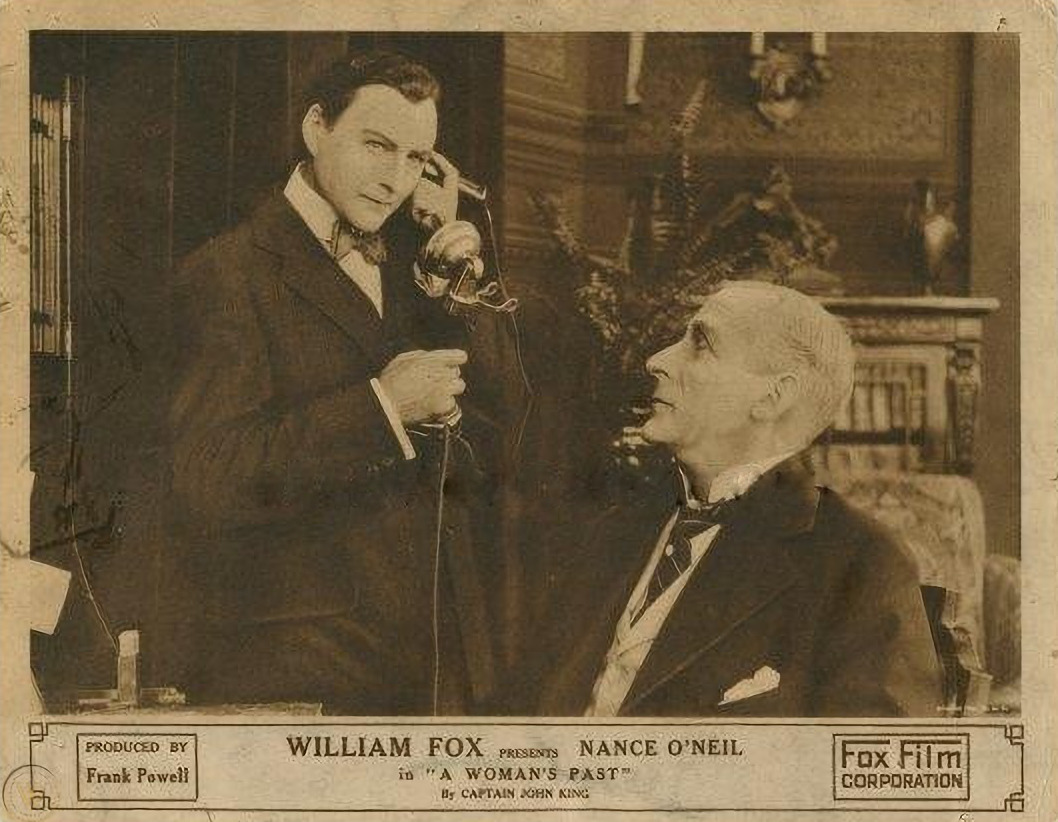
- Alfred Hickman and Carleton Macy on a lobby card for the film
- Directed by: Frank Powell
- Written by: Rex Ingram
- Based on: A Woman's Past by Captain John King
- Produced by: William Fox
- Starring: Nance O'Neil; Alfred Hickman
- Distributed by: Fox Film Corporation
- Release date: November 11, 1915
- Running time: 5 reels
- Country: United States
- Language: Silent

A Woman's Past is a lost 1915 silent film drama directed by Frank Powell and starring Nance O'Neil. It was based on a play by Captain John King. The film was produced and distributed by the Fox Film Corporation.

== Cast ==
- Clifford Bruce - Wilson Stanley
- Alfred Hickman - Howard Sterling/Harrison
- Carleton Macy - Denton Colt
- Nance O'Neil - Jane Hawley
