= Souls in Bondage =

1916 film by Edgar Lewis

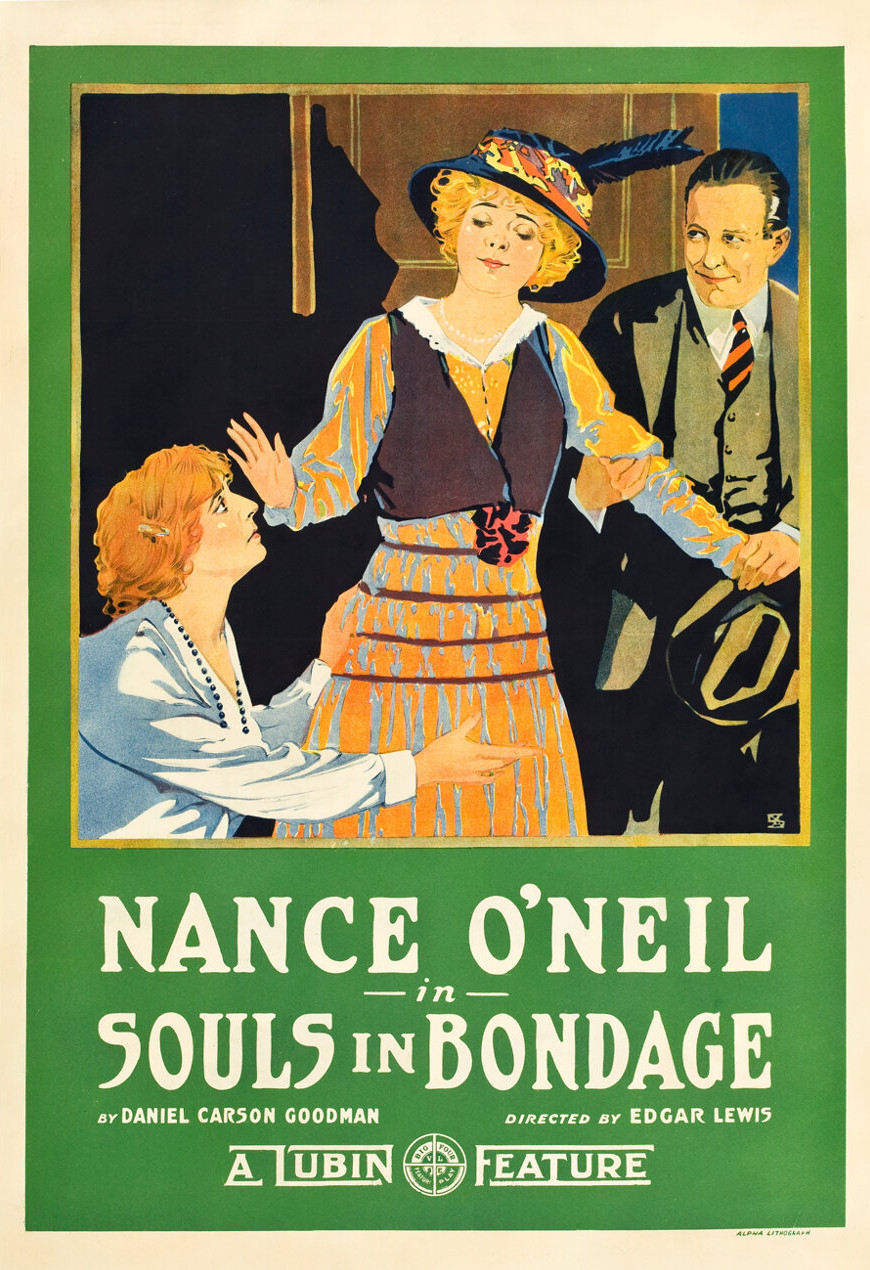
- Lobby poster
- Directed by: Edgar Lewis
- Written by: Daniel Carson Goodman
- Produced by: Lubin Manufacturing Company; Siegmund Lubin
- Starring: Nance O'Neil
- Distributed by: V-L-S-E
- Release date: January 31, 1916
- Running time: 5 reels
- Country: United States
- Language: Silent (English intertitles)

Souls in Bondage is a 1916 American silent drama film directed by Edgar Lewis and produced by the Lubin Manufacturing Company. Nance O'Neil stars in the film, which involves two sisters and an illegitimate child.

== Cast ==
- Nance O'Neil as Rosa Brenner
- Mary Carr as Mrs. Coombes (credited as Mrs. Carr)
- William Corbett as Julian Forbes
- Bernard Siegel as Mr. Brenner
- Ida Stanhope as Rita Brenner
- Mrs. Stuart as Mrs. Forbes

== Censorship ==
Like many American films of the time, Souls in Bondage was subject to cuts by city and state film censorship boards. For example, the Ohio Board of Censors required a cut of two intertitles, "I'll kill you" and "You fool," and of the shooting of woman. The Pennsylvania board required so many cuts that the film distributor chose not to exhibit such a mutilated film in that state.

== Preservation ==
With no prints of Souls in Bondage located in any film archives, it is a lost film.
