= The Shadow of Rosalie Byrnes =

1920 film

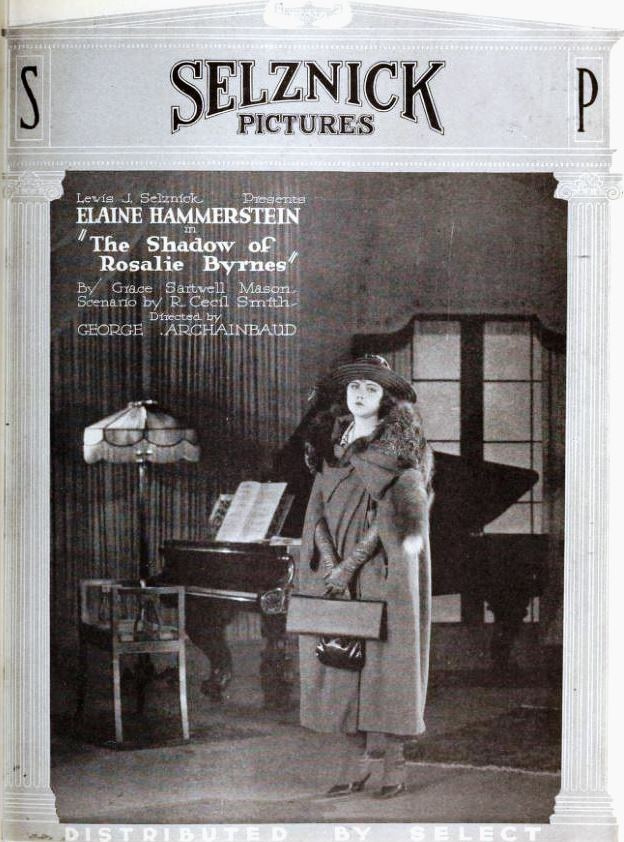
- Directed by: George Archainbaud
- Written by: Grace Sartwell Mason (novel); R. Cecil Smith
- Produced by: Lewis J. Selznick
- Starring: Elaine Hammerstein; Edward Langford; Alfred Hickman
- Cinematography: Jules Cronjager; Lucien Tainguy
- Production company: Selznick Pictures
- Distributed by: Selznick Pictures
- Release date: April 12, 1920
- Running time: 50 minutes
- Country: United States
- Languages: Silent; English intertitles

The Shadow of Rosalie Byrnes is a 1920 American silent drama film directed by George Archainbaud and starring Elaine Hammerstein, Edward Langford and Alfred Hickman.

== Cast ==
- Elaine Hammerstein as Leontine Maddern / Leona Maddern
- Edward Langford as Gerald Cromwell
- Anita Booth as Eleanor
- Alfred Hickman as Hugo Stone
- Fanny Cogan as Mrs. Lange
- George Cowl as Vasco Lamar
- Lillian Worth as Mrs. Cromwell
- Juliette Benson as Miss Christine

== Bibliography ==
- Connelly, Robert B. The Silents: Silent Feature Films, 1910-36, Volume 40, Issue 2. December Press, 1998.
- Munden, Kenneth White. The American Film Institute Catalog of Motion Pictures Produced in the United States, Part 1. University of California Press, 1997.
