= The A.B.C. of Love =

1919 film by Léonce Perret

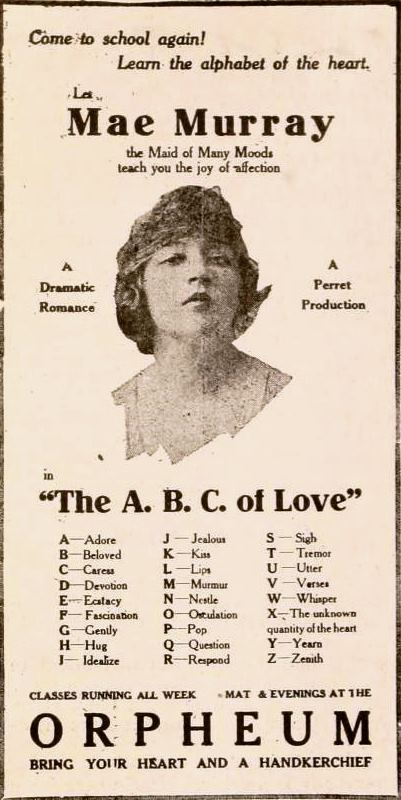
- Directed by: Léonce Perret
- Written by: Léonce Perret
- Produced by: Léonce Perret
- Starring: Mae Murray; Holmes Herbert; Dorothy Green
- Cinematography: Harry D. Harde; Alfred Ortlieb
- Production company: Acme Pictures
- Distributed by: Pathé Exchange
- Release date: December 14, 1919
- Running time: 60 minutes
- Country: United States
- Language: Silent (English intertitles)

The film

The A.B.C. of Love is a 1919 American silent drama film directed by Léonce Perret and starring Mae Murray, Holmes Herbert, and Dorothy Green. The film tells the love story between playwright Harry Bryant and an orphaned girl, Kate, whom he meets while driving through the countryside.

== Plot ==
According to a film magazine, "Harry Bryant is driving in a country lane in his automobile when he chances upon a girl, with a tangled mass of blonde curls, astride a white horse. The girl, who is dressed in boys' clothes, gives her name as Kate and says she is without living relatives, her grandfather having recently died. She is going out into the world to seek her fortune.

The hero finds work for her at a country inn, and drives away, after leaving his name and address. Kate stays but a short time at the inn, as she is subjected to much unpleasantness. She steals away one night and in the course of time makes her way to Bryant's home, located at Stony Brook farm. Bryant, who is a playwright by profession, is embarrassed by her arrival, but Kate coaxes him to allow her to remain. She tempts him by her innocence, but he plays fair with her and at length determines to marry the girl, though she is unable to read or write and knows nothing of life.

He eventually introduces his wife to New York society. She becomes madly jealous of a certain Diana Nelson, and not without reason, but Bryant in his turn becomes jealous of her. When he learns that her mysterious visits to a certain apartment house every day are for the purpose of learning to read and write, real love dawns in his heart and they are happily reconciled."

== Cast ==
- Mae Murray as Kate
- Holmes Herbert as Harry Bryant
- Dorothy Green as Diana Nelson
- Arthur Donaldson as Prof. George Collins

== Production ==
An official song for the film was written by Charles M. Smith and Harry Edelheit, published by Jerome H. Remick & Co.

== Bibliography ==
- Michael G. Ankerich. Mae Murray: The Girl with the Bee-stung Lips. University Press of Kentucky, 2012.
