= The Iron Woman (film) =

1916 film

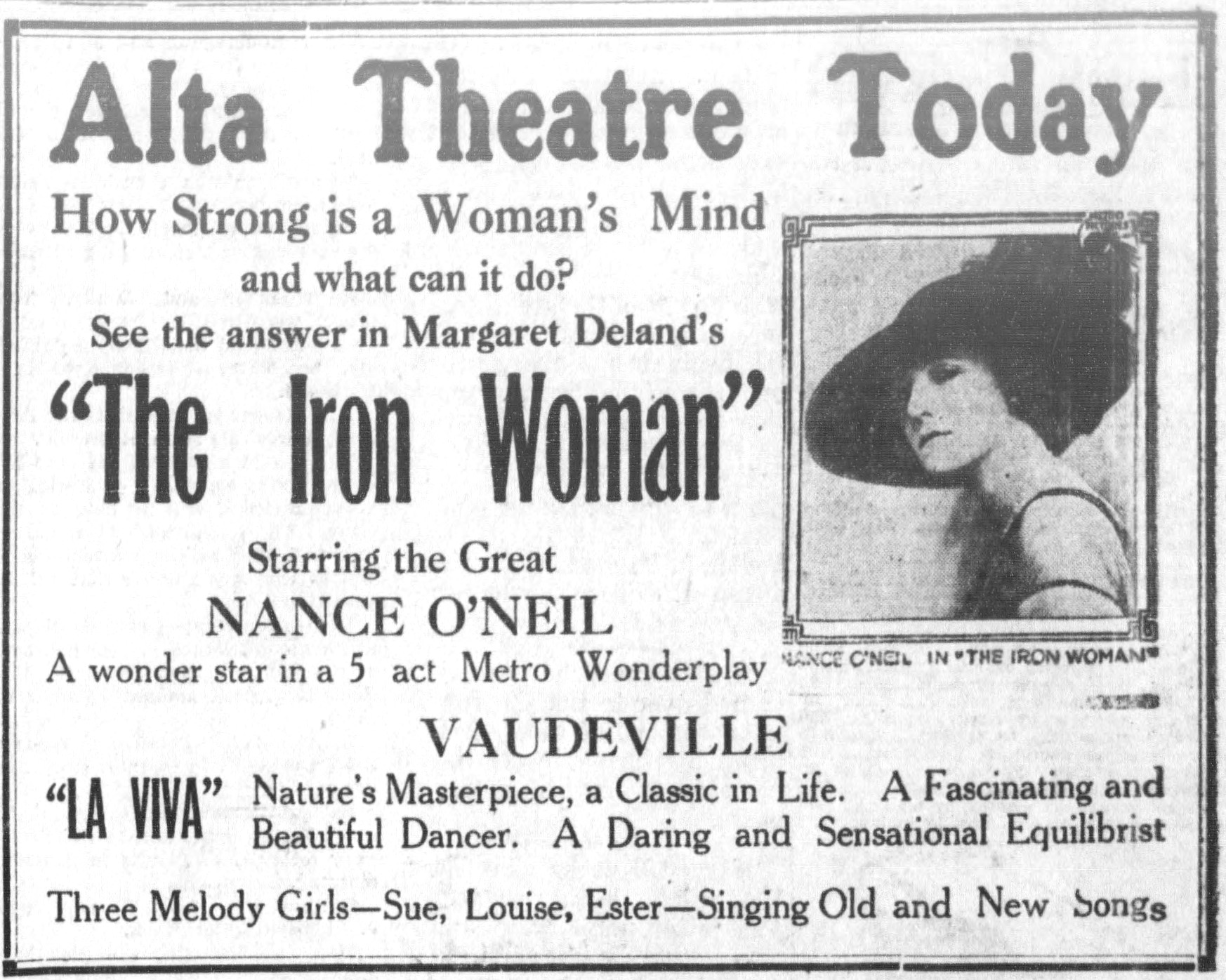
- Newspaper advertisement
- Directed by: Carl Harbaugh
- Written by: Wallace Clifton
- Based on: The Iron Woman by Margaret Deland
- Starring: Nance O'Neil
- Cinematography: Robert Smith
- Distributed by: Metro Pictures
- Release date: October 2, 1916
- Running time: Six reels
- Country: United States
- Language: Silent

The Iron Woman is a 1916 American silent drama film directed by Carl Harbaugh. The film is considered to be lost.

== Cast ==
- Nance O'Neil as Sarah Maitland
- Einar Linden as David Ritchie
- Alfred Hickman as Blair Maitland
- Evelyn Brent as Nannie Maitland
- Vera Sisson as Elizabeth Ferguson
- William Postance as Robert Ferguson
- Christine Mayo as Helena Ritchie
