= When Rome Ruled =

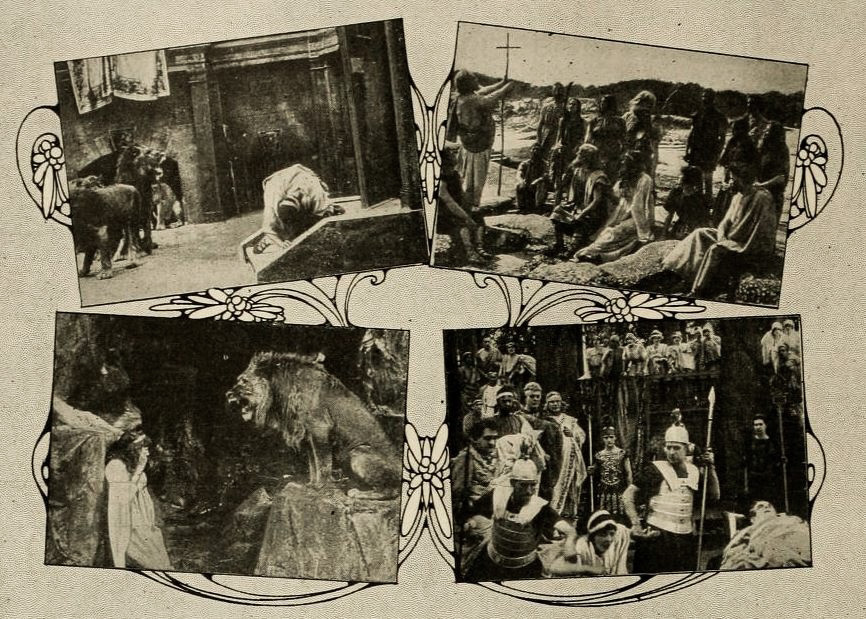
- Directed by: George Fitzmaurice
- Starring: Nell Craig; Clifford Bruce; Riley Hatch
- Production company: Pathé Exchange
- Distributed by: Eclectic Film Company
- Release date: August 1914
- Running time: 50 minutes
- Country: United States
- Languages: Silent; English intertitles

When Rome Ruled is a 1914 American silent historical drama film directed by George Fitzmaurice and starring Nell Craig, Clifford Bruce and Riley Hatch. It was made at the American subsidiary of the French company Pathé, shortly to be relaunched as Pathé Exchange, at studios in Fort Lee, New Jersey. It was an attempt to imitate the classical epics of Italian cinema, but made on a much lower budget. It marked the directorial debut of Fitzmaurice who emerged as a leading filmmaker during the 1920s.

== Cast ==
- Nell Craig as Nydia
- Clifford Bruce as Caius
- Riley Hatch as Caius' Father
- Walter R. Seymour as Nydia's Father
- Rosita Marstini as Caius' Bride
- A.H. Busby as Caius' Bride's Father
- Charles E. Bunnell as A High Priest of Jupiter

== Bibliography ==
- Jay Robert Nash, Robert Connelly & Stanley Ralph Ross. Motion Picture Guide Silent Film 1910-1936. Cinebooks, 1988.
