= The Devil at His Elbow =

1916 film by Burton L. King

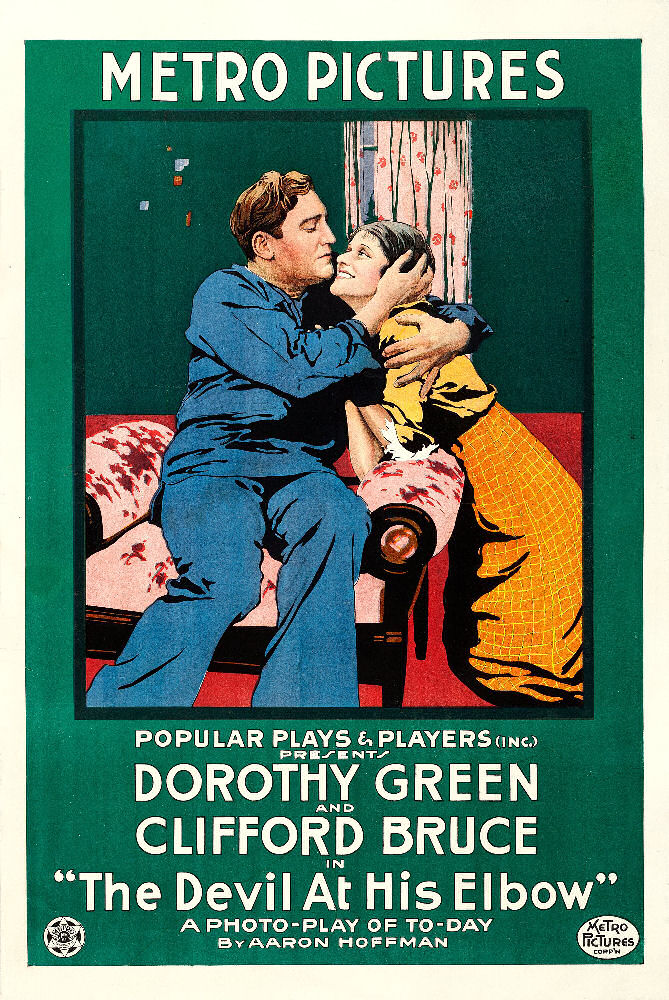
- Directed by: Burton L. King
- Written by: Wallace Clifton; Aaron Hoffman
- Starring: Clifford Bruce; Dorothy Green; Adolphe Menjou
- Cinematography: Neil Bergman
- Production companies: Popular Plays and Players
- Distributed by: Metro Pictures
- Release date: July 31, 1916
- Running time: 5 reels
- Country: United States
- Languages: Silent; English intertitles

The Devil at His Elbow is a 1916 American silent drama film directed by Burton L. King and starring Clifford Bruce, Dorothy Green and Adolphe Menjou.

== Cast ==
- Clifford Bruce as John Ashton
- Dorothy Green as Meg
- John K. Roberts as Robert Gray
- Francis McDonald as Andrew Sealey
- Mary Sandway as Grace Sealey
- Adolphe Menjou as Wilfred Carleton
- Edward Martindel as Franklin Darrow

== Bibliography ==
- Alison McMahan. Alice Guy Blaché: Lost Visionary of the Cinema. Bloomsbury Publishing, 2014.
