= Black Is White =

1920 film by Charles Giblyn

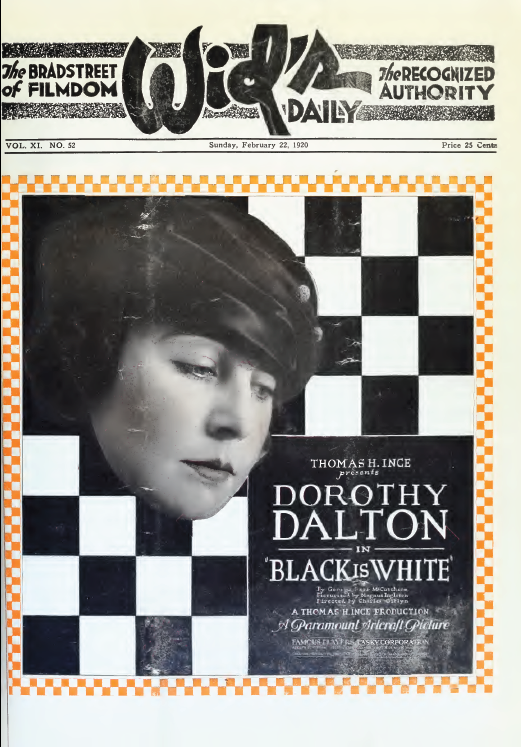
- Advertisement for film
- Directed by: Charles Giblyn
- Written by: E. Magnus Ingleton (adaptation, screenplay)
- Based on: Black is White by George Barr McCutcheon
- Produced by: Thomas H. Ince
- Cinematography: John Stumar
- Distributed by: Paramount Pictures
- Release date: March 7, 1920
- Running time: 62 minutes; 6 reels
- Country: United States
- Language: Silent (English intertitles)

Black Is White is a 1920 American silent drama film starring Dorothy Dalton and directed by Charles Giblyn. It was produced by Thomas H. Ince and distributed by Paramount Pictures. The movie is based on a novel, Black is White, by George Barr McCutcheon. The film's spelling differs from the spelling of the novel. The plot is one in which a woman stands almost any form of abuse from a man and finally forgives him at the moment she has opportunity for the revenge she has always sought, such stories being somewhat popular at the time.

Prints of the film exist at the Library of Congress and UCLA Film & Television Archive.

== Plot ==
As described in a film magazine, Margaret Brood is driven from her home by her jealous husband Jim, who after imagining that she is untrue to him finally doubts if he is the father of their son. She causes a report to be published that she is dead and goes to Paris to live with a distant relation, taking the name Yvonne. Fifteen years later her husband comes to Paris, is attracted by what he considers is her resemblance to his dead wife, and marries her. She returns to America with him. Unable to hide her love for her son, she arouses her husband's suspicions and in a moment of rage he shoots the young man. After nursing her son back to health, Margaret tells her husband the truth, produces proof that she has always been true to him, and forgives him.

== Cast ==
- Dorothy Dalton as Margaret Brood/Yvonne Strakosch
- Holmes Herbert as Jim Brood (credited as Holmes E. Herbert)
- Jack Crosby as Frederick Bond
- Clifford Bruce as Baron Demetrious Strakosch
- Claire Mersereau as Lyda Desmond
- Lillian Lawrence as Mrs. Desmond
- Joseph Granby as Ranjab
- Patrick Barrett as Daws
- Tom Cameron as Riggs
