= The Flames of Johannis =

1916 film by Edgar Lewis

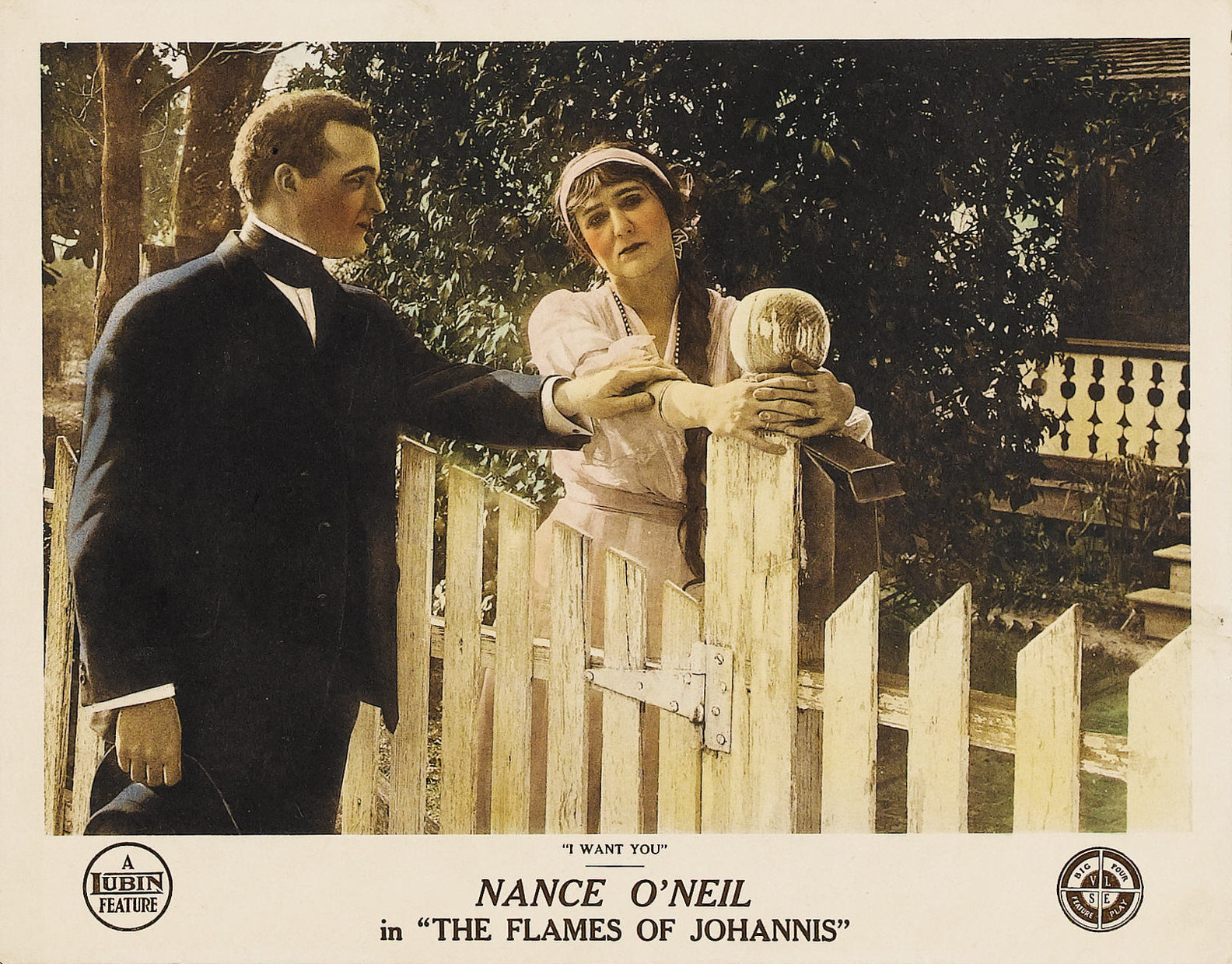
- Lobby card
- Directed by: Edgar Lewis
- Written by: Alfred Hickman
- Based on: Fires of St. John by Hermann Sudermann
- Produced by: Siegmund Lubin
- Cinematography: Edward C. Earle
- Distributed by: V-L-S-E
- Release date: April 10, 1916
- Running time: 5 reels
- Country: USA
- Language: Silent..English titles

The Flames of Johannis is a lost 1916 silent film drama directed by Edgar Lewis and starring Nance O'Neil. It was written by O'Neil's husband Alfred Hickman and produced by the Lubin Manufacturing Company.

== Cast ==
- Nance O'Neil - Zirah/Marika
- George Clarke - Mr. Vogel
- Eleanor Barry - Mrs. Vogel
- Ethel Tully - Gertrude
- Victor Sutherland - George
- Irving Dillon - Pastor Hoffner
- Mary Carr - Kate (*as Mrs. Carr)
- James Cassady - Paul
- Violet Axzell - Little George
- Rosemary Carr - Little Marika
