= Dorothy Green (silent film actress) =

American silent film actress (1892–1963)

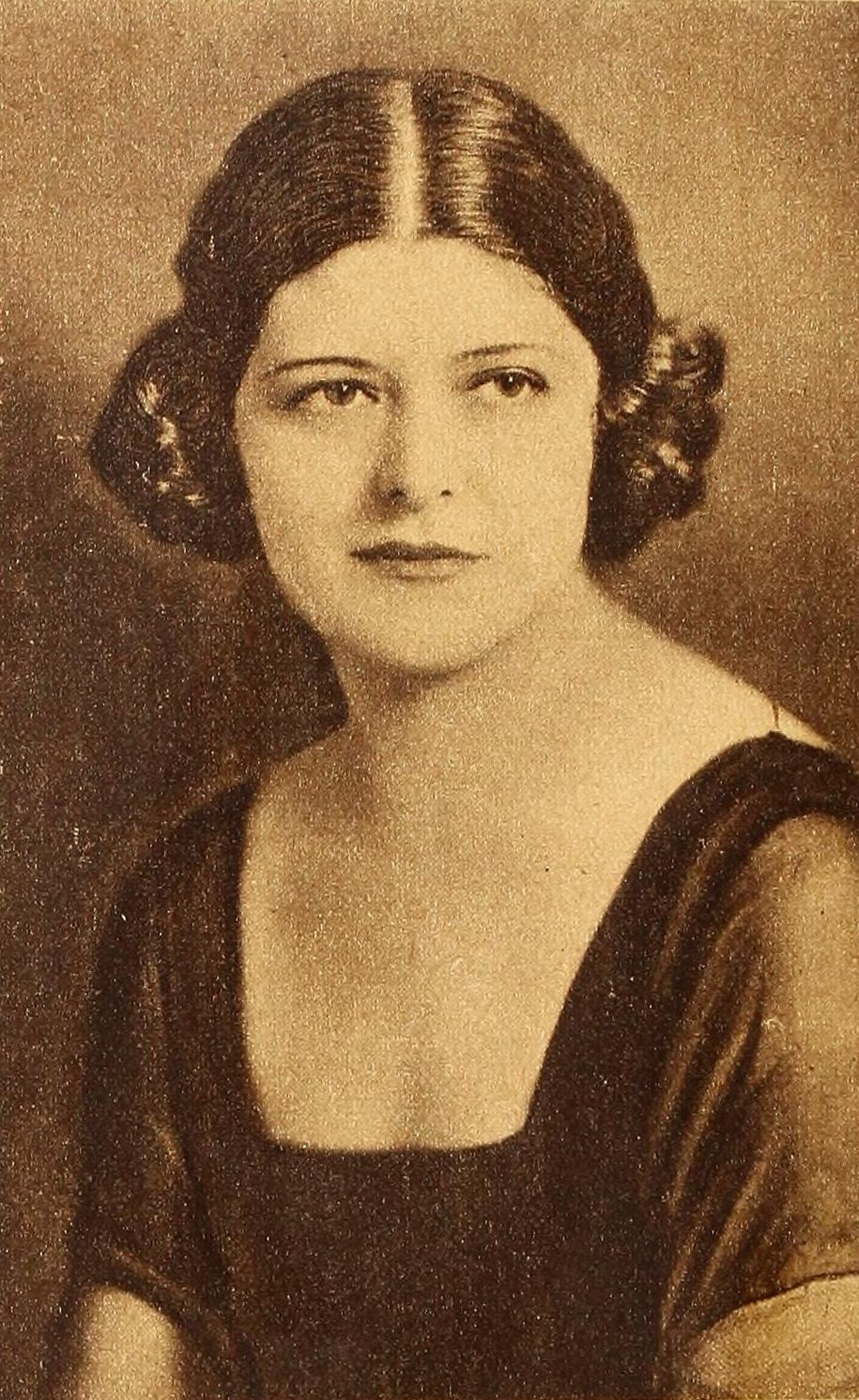
- Green in 1919
- Born: March 5, 1892; Manhattan, New York City, New York, U.S.
- Died: November 16, 1963 (aged 71); New York City
- Resting place: Mount Zion Cemetery; Maspeth, Queens, New York City, New York, U.S.
- Occupation: Actress
- Years active: 1914–1929
- Spouses: Samuel Harry Pomerance (m. 1911; div. 1918) Norman November (m. 1930; died 1963)

Signature
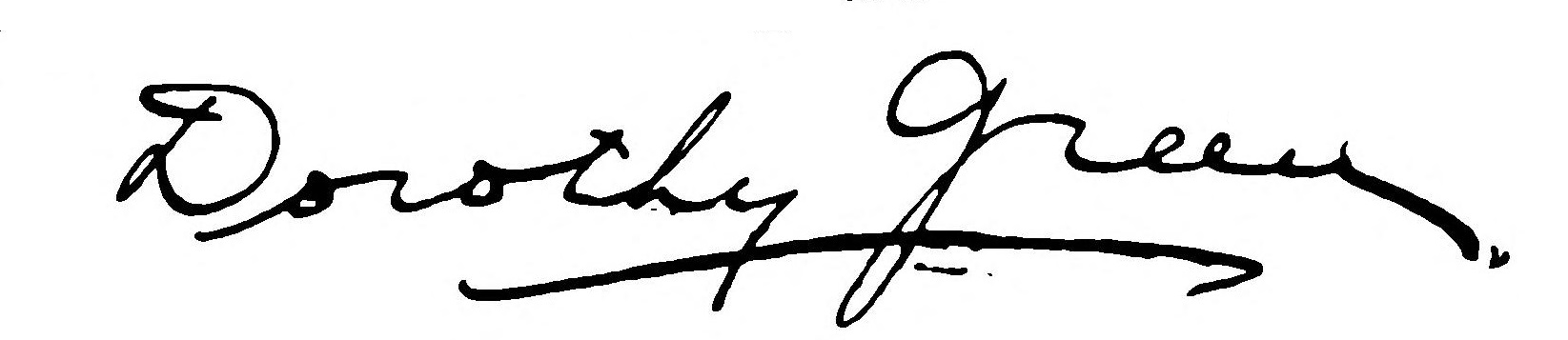

Dorothy Green (March 5, 1892 – November 16, 1963) was an American silent film actress.

== Biography ==
Dorothy Green was born to Benny and Anna Green on March 5, 1892, in Manhattan, New York City. Her birth certificate lists her first name as “Vera”, but she appears later in United States Census records as “Dorothy”. Her parents immigrated from what was then the Russian Empire in 1886, and her father worked as a tailor. She was the oldest of six children — Bella (b. 1895), Mamie (b.1898), Sadie (b. 1900), Harry (b.1902) and William (b. 1903). Belle also had a brief career as an actress, using the stage name "Belle Green".

Green claimed to have been born in St. Petersburg, before immigrating to the United States at the age of three, however her vital records indicate she was born in New York to parents of Russian extraction. At the time, it was not unusual for actors to lie about or embellish their origin story — similarly, Green also claimed to have been born in 1895.

== Career ==
Green had film roles in Forest Rivals (1919), The Lesson (1917), The Wonderful Adventure (1915), A Parisian Romance, Her Mother's Secret, The American Way Souls Aflame, The Devils at His Elbow, The Good Bad Wife, Patria (a serial), The Praise Agent with Arthur Ashley, and The Grouch. Green also performed on stage with the New Shakespeare Company, where fellow performer John Gielgud viewed her acting favorably.

She was best known for playing "vamp" roles, such as in Patria, The Devils at His Elbow, and A Parisian Romance

== Personal life ==
Green married Samuel Harry Pomerance (b. 1886), a fellow Russian-American, in New York City in March 1911. In October 1916, Pomerance brought an alienation of affection suit against Emanuel S. “Manny” Chapelle (d. 1920), a wine agent and the husband of ice skater Grace Helaine (d. 1936), the sister of actress Billie Burke. Pomerance hired private detectives who testified they had seen Green and Chapelle together, and had Green's apartment raided, where she was found with Chapelle. When Helaine filed for divorce against Chapelle in 1918, she named Green as a co-respondent.

Green retired from acting in 1930. She remarried Hungarian-American lawyer Norman November (1888–1966). She died in 1963 at the age of 71 in New York City.

== Filmography ==
- The Spirit of the Poppy (1914, as Celeste)
- The Country Boy (1915, as Amy Leroy)
- The Model (1915, as Marcelle Rigadout)
- After Dark (1915, as Fanny Dalton)
- The Wonderful Adventure (1915, as Mazora)
- Her Mother's Secret (1915, as Lorna)
- A Parisian Romance (1916, as Rosa)
- The Devil at His Elbow (1916, as Meg)
- Patria (1917, as Fanny Blair)
- The Lesson (1917, as Ada Thompson)
- The Grouch (1918, as Fleurette)
- The American Way (1919, as Betty Winthrop)
- The Dark Star (1919, as Princess Naia)
- The Praise Agent (1919, as Nell Eubanks)
- Forest Rivals (1919, as Julie Lamont)
- The A.B.C. of Love (1919, as Diana Nelson)
- The Good-Bad Wife (1920, as Fanchon La Fare)
- The Informer (1929)
