= Nance O'Neil =

American actress (1874–1965)

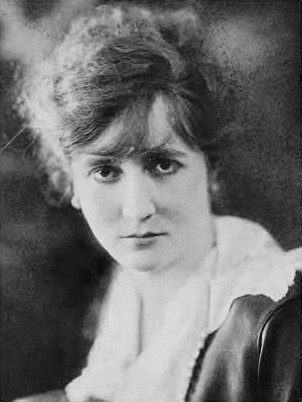
- Stars of the Photoplay, 1916
- Born: Gertrude Lamson; October 8, 1874; Oakland, California, U.S.
- Died: February 7, 1965 (aged 90); Englewood, New Jersey, U.S.
- Occupation: Actress
- Years active: 1893–1935
- Spouse: Alfred Hickman (m. 1916; died 1931)

Gertrude Lamson (October 8, 1874 – February 7, 1965), known professionally as Nance O'Neil, was an American stage and film actress who performed in plays in various theaters around the world but worked predominantly in the United States between the 1890s and 1930s. At the height of her career, she was promoted on theater bills and in period trade publications and newspapers as the "American Bernhardt".

== Early life ==
O'Neil was born in Oakland, California, to George Lamson and Arre Findley.

== Career ==
=== Stage ===
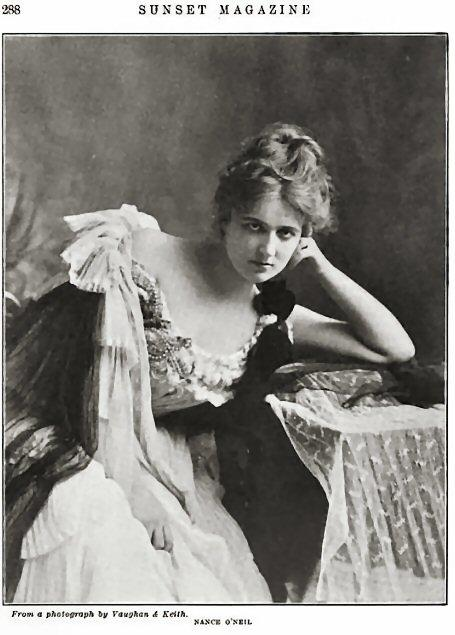
Sunset Magazine, May–October, 1903

O'Neil's first performance in a professional production was in the role of a nun in Sarah at the Alcazar Theatre in San Francisco on October 16, 1893. Before returning to San Francisco in 1898 and 1899 as a star, headlining in the plays The Jewess and The Shadow, she spent the preceding years honing her acting skills by playing in every type of venue, "from barns to first-class theatres", in towns throughout the country's West and Northwest. O'Neil later described that early period of her career as a time when she appeared "in fully a hundred characters, varying from soubrettes to heavies."

As her celebrity grew, after her success in San Francisco, O'Neil embarked on an around-the-world tour, performing in Hawaii, Australia, Egypt, and in many other locations overseas. Those extensive travels and stage appearances were managed by McKee Rankin—an actor, manager, and producer—who was instrumental in also making her a star in Australia and in overseeing her London debut at the Adelphi Theatre on September 1, 1902, in the play Magda. The next day, back in the United States, The New York Times reported on that important performance in England, noting that in the early acts of the play O'Neil "gave an intense, imperious and unequal rendering of the part." The newspaper added that the actress's "nervousness" later eased on stage and she "aroused the big audience to enthusiasm in the climax of the third act, and obtained a good reception."

Two other plays in which O'Neil also starred in London that same month—Camille and Elizabeth, Queen of England—were poorly received by English critics and forced her to terminate early her plans for additional engagements there in October 1902. The London Times wholly dismissed her company's presentation of Camille as "flauntingly, overwhelming provincial" and criticized her performance in Elizabeth, Queen of England as "lacking tenderness".

In 1906 she played the title role in Leah, the Forsaken. She also appeared in Trilby, Camille, The Common Standard, The Wanderer, Macbeth, Agnes, Sappho, The Passion Flower, Hedda Gabler, and many other productions in the United States and Europe. In 1908, a theater critic for The New York Times shared his opinions regarding O'Neil's acting talents, providing what he viewed as both the strengths and weaknesses of her performances:

There is no actress on the stage at present who has a more remarkable gift for emotional expression, nor is there a single one who has been more lavishly endowed by nature with the physical gifts which enter into the equipment of great actresses....Miss O'Neil has a kind of massive beauty, and she is not without much natural grace. Her voice is a splendid organ, rich and deep, with plenty of color and sweetness. There are moments when it is expressive of deep feeling. But there are more extended periods when it is pitched in monotonous cadences, during which the actress speaks seem to be delivered without a hint of genuine feeling or understanding, when, in short, she is simply an actress giving voice to words that she has conned and learned by rote and delivered in a sort of phonographic manner without a suggestion of the thought behind them.

The statuesque O'Neil performed in Louisville, Kentucky, opposite such actors as Wilton Lackaye, Edmund Breese, William Faversham, Thomas A. Wise, and Harriet MacGibbon. There were regular productions, including Ned McCobb's Daughter, The Front Page, and The Big Fight.

For over four decades, O'Neil also performed in a wide variety of Broadway productions. She appeared early in her career in True to Life at the Murray Hill Theatre in Manhattan in 1896 and then, late in her career, in Night in the House at the Booth Theatre in 1935.

=== Film ===
O'Neil began acting in silent films with studios in New York and New Jersey before moving to California to work in Hollywood productions. Among her early films are the 1915 drama The Kreutzer Sonata and the 1916 five-reeler The Witch. Both of those motion pictures were filmed at Fox Film Corporation's facilities in Fort Lee, New Jersey. More than a decade later, she made a successful transition to the sound era, although she retired from films after working a few years in the new medium. Some of O'Neil's screen appearances in that period include performances in the 1930 features Ladies of Leisure, The Royal Bed, and The Rogue Song; in the 1931 releases Cimarron and Transgression; and in the 1932 medical drama False Faces, her final film.

== Personal life ==
In 1904, O'Neil met acquitted murder suspect Lizzie Borden while in Boston. The two had a close friendship, which incited considerable gossip.

O'Neil in 1916 married Alfred Hickman (née Devereaux-Hickman), a British-born film actor who was previously married to actress Blanche Walsh. The same year that Hickman and O'Neil married, they costarred in the Fox film The Witch. Then they costarred on screen again in 1917, portraying Emperor Nicholas II of Russia and Empress Alexandra in The Fall of the Romanoffs. O'Neil's marriage to Hickman continued for another 14 years, until Alfred died in 1931.

== Death ==
In her final years, O'Neil resided at the Lillian Booth Actors Home in Englewood, New Jersey. She died there, at age 90, on February 7, 1965. A cinerary urn containing her ashes was transported to Forest Lawn Memorial Park in Glendale, California. There, her remains were placed in the park's columbarium, inside the niche that also holds her husband Alfred's cinerary urn.

== In Culture ==
In 2026, a depiction of O'Neill was featured in the fourth season of Ryan Murphy's true crime anthology series Monster—focused on her and Lizzie Borden's close relationship. She is portrayed by Jessica Barden.

== Partial filmography ==
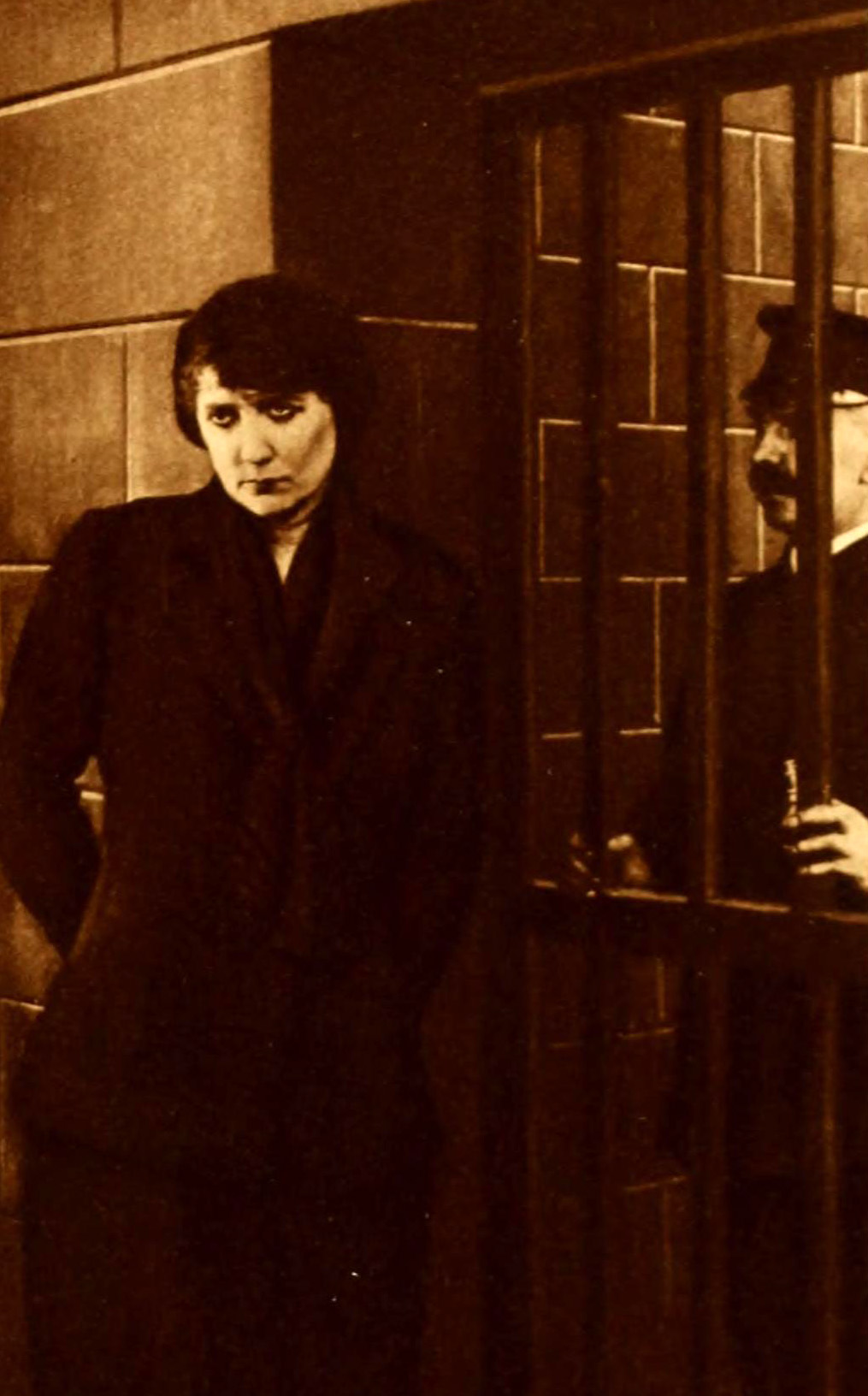
O'Neil as Jane Brett in still from the 1916 film The Toilers (also known as Those Who Toil )

- The Count of Monte Cristo (1913) – Mercedes
- The Kreutzer Sonata (1915) – Miriam Friedlander
- Princess Romanoff (1915) – Princess Fedora Romanoff
- A Woman's Past (1915) – Jane Hawley
- Souls in Bondage (1916) – Rosa Brenner
- The Witch (1916) – Zora Fernandez
- The Flames of Johannis (1916) – Zirah / Marika
- The Toilers (1916) – Jane Brett
- The Iron Woman (1916) – Sarah Maitland
- Greed (1917) – Alma
- The Seventh Sin (1917) – Alma
- Mrs. Balfame (1917) – Mrs. Balfame
- Hedda Gabler (1917) – Hedda Gabler
- The Final Payment (1917) – Nina
- The Fall of the Romanoffs (1917) – Czarina Alexandra
- Seven Deadly Sins (1917) – Alma (Greed) & (Seventh Sin)
- Resurrection (1927)
- His Glorious Night (1929) – Eugenie
- Ladies of Leisure (1930) – Mrs.John Strong
- The Rogue Song (1930) – Princess Alexandra
- The Lady of Scandal (1930) – Lady Trench
- The Florodora Girl (1930) – Mrs. Vibart
- Call of the Flesh (1930) – Mother Superior
- The Eyes of the World (1930) – Myra Willard
- The Royal Bed (1931) – Queen Martha
- Cimarron (1931) – Felice Venable
- Resurrection (1931) – Princess Marya
- The Good Bad Girl (1931) – Mrs. J.P. Henderson
- Transgression (1931) – Honora 'Nora' Maury
- A Woman of Experience (1931) – Countess Runyi
- Their Mad Moment (1931) – Grand Mere
- Secret Service (1931) – Mrs. Varney
- Westward Passage (1932) – Mrs. von Stael (uncredited)
- False Faces (1932) – Mrs. Finn
