= The Final Payment =

1917 film by Frank Powell

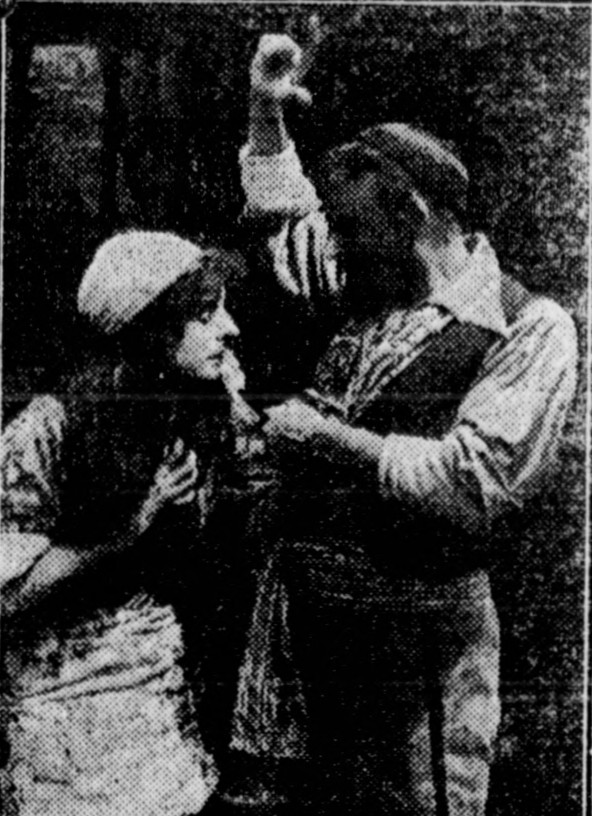
- Scene from the film
- Directed by: Frank Powell
- Written by: Frank Powell
- Produced by: William Fox
- Starring: Nance O'Neil; Jane Miller; Clifford Bruce
- Cinematography: David Calcagni
- Production company: Fox Film
- Distributed by: Fox Film
- Release date: May 21, 1917
- Running time: 50 minutes
- Country: United States
- Languages: Silent; English intertitles

The Final Payment is a 1917 American silent drama film directed by Frank Powell and starring Nance O'Neil, Jane Miller and Clifford Bruce.

== Cast ==
- Nance O'Neil as Nina
- Jane Miller as Rose, Her Sister
- Clifford Bruce as Cesare
- Leslie Austin as Neccola
- Alfred Hickman as Alfredo
- Dorothy Bernard as Marie

== Censorship ==
Before The Final Payment could be exhibited in Kansas, the Kansas State Board of Review required the elimination of a hanging scene in reel 4.

== Bibliography ==
- Solomon, Aubrey. The Fox Film Corporation, 1915-1935: A History and Filmography. McFarland, 2011.
