= The Witch (1916 film) =

1916 American film

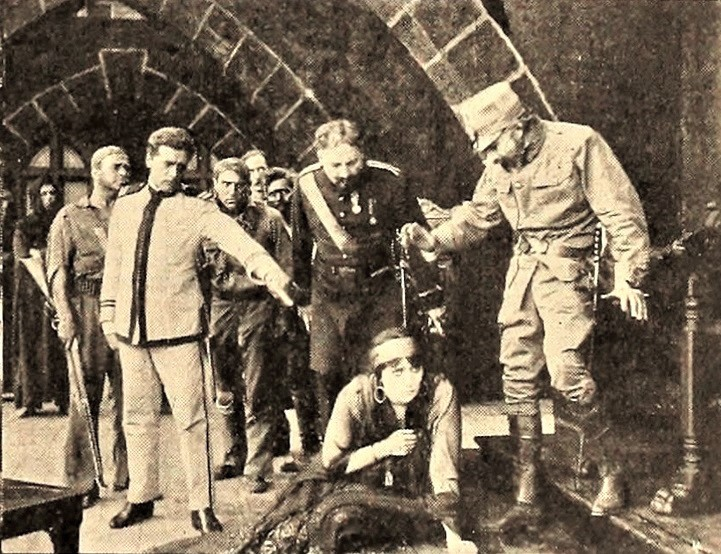
- Film still showing the title character Zora (Nance O'Neil) being accused of witchcraft
- Directed by: Frank Powell
- Screenplay by: Frank Powell
- Based on: La Sorcière by Victorien Sardou
- Produced by: William Fox
- Starring: Nance O'Neil; Alfred Hickman; Frank Russell
- Distributed by: Fox Film Corporation
- Release date: February 27, 1916
- Running time: 5 reels (approximately 5,000 feet or 65 minutes) (Note: According to the reference How Movies Work by Bruce F. Kawin (New York: Macmillan Publishing Company, 1987, pp. 46-47), a full 1000-foot reel of film in the silent era had a maximum running time of 15 minutes. Silent films were generally projected at a "standard" speed of 16 frames per second, much slower than the 24 frames of later sound films. Also, all the reels in a multiple-reel film were usually not filled to their maximum capacities.)
- Country: United States
- Language: Silent (English intertitles)

The Witch is a lost 1916 American silent drama film directed by Frank Powell, produced by Fox Film Corporation, and starring Nance O'Neil, Alfred Hickman, and Frank Russell. Based on the 1903 play La Sorcière (The Sorceress) by French dramatist Victorien Sardou, this adaptation portrayed the challenges facing a young woman living in a territory in Mexico wracked by military and social unrest. It was filmed at Fox's studio in Fort Lee, New Jersey, where a Mexican village was constructed on the company's backlot and used as the principal set for outdoor scenes.

The Library of Congress includes the film among the National Film Preservation Board's updated 2019 list of "7,200 Lost U.S. Silent Feature Films" produced between 1912 and 1929.

== Plot ==
With its storyline set in early twentieth-century Mexico, this lost film portrayed the plight of Zora Fernandez (Nance O'Neil), a beautiful and exotic woman who becomes entangled in a love affair and is persecuted by local officials following an armed uprising. Her father, Dr. Fernandez (Frank Russell), is a physician and also a general who leads an insurrection against General Mendoza (Alfred Hickman), the military governor of the surrounding territory. The doctor and his forces are defeated, and he dies in battle. The victorious Mendoza now resents Zora for her past indifference to his romantic advances and suspects she may try to oppose his authority as well. The governor is concerned too about Zora's reputation as a sorceress, most notably for her abilities to cast spells and concoct miraculous potions. In reality, her father, as a medical doctor, had taught her hypnosis and how to treat various illnesses. Those abilities, however, are viewed by most of the residents in her village as supernatural and forms of witchcraft. (Note: This plot summary is composed from a compilation of plot and scene descriptions of The Witch included in reports and reviews published in a variety of trade publications and newspapers between August 1915 and March 1916.)

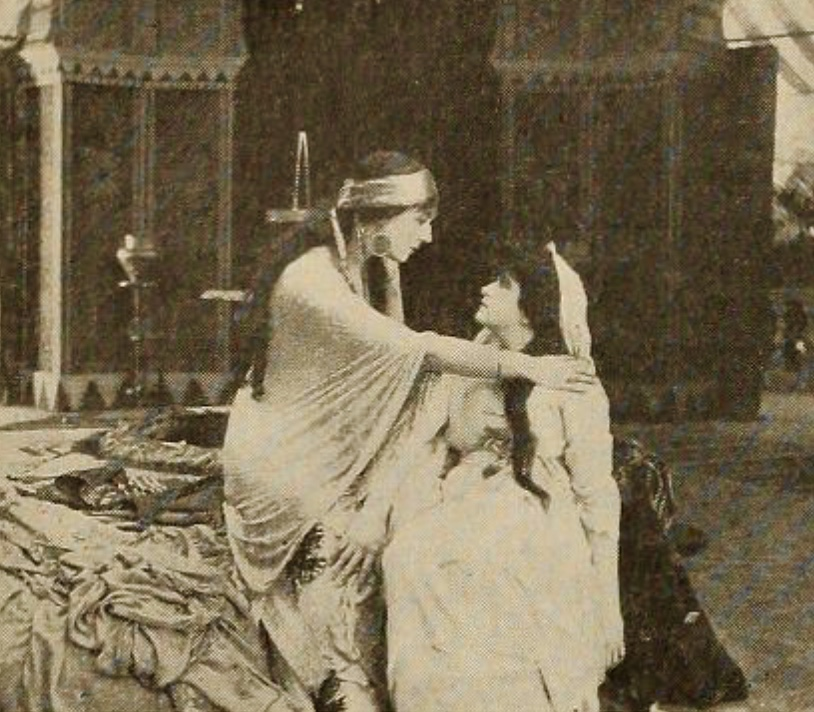
Still of O'Neil (left) in scene in which her character Zora hypnotized Dolores, the military governor's daughter (Jane Miller)

To isolate the "witch", Governor Mendoza forces Zora to leave her village and then issues a proclamation warning citizens that any women who associate with her will be imprisoned for life; men who do so will be immediately hung. Zora, despite being ostracized, continues to help the rural poor and sick by dispensing herbal medicines and using her "magical mental power". When Mendoza's daughter Dolores (Jane Miller) begins to suffer from being "addicted to walking in her sleep", her attending nurse secretly sends for the witch to come cure her. Zora slips into the governor's palace with the help of the nurse and then uses her "mastery of hypnosis" to cure the young woman. Returning to her "secluded abode" outside the village, Zora now meets Lieutenant Riques, a prominent official's son. They fall in love, although she is unaware that the handsome soldier is engaged to marry Dolores.

Zora later learns of Riques' impending marriage, becomes angry, and quietly goes back to the governor's palace the night before the wedding on the pretext of checking on her patient. Using hypnosis again, Zora puts Dolores into a trance from which "she will never wake unless at the call of her power." Acquaintances of Zora and Riques now betray the clandestine lovers and reveal their affair. The couple are arrested and tried, but Zora saves Riques from hanging by assuming all the blame and lying that she had captured his heart by casting a spell on him, one that he could not resist. Zora is then convicted, sentenced to death for witchcraft, and carried away by a mob to be burned at the stake. Zora is about to be executed when Dolores's nurse rushes in to inform the governor that his daughter is in a deep sleep at his palace, cannot be awakened, and only Zora can save her. When offered her freedom in exchange for releasing Dolores from her coma-like condition, Zora agrees and awakens the governor's daughter. Mendoza then banishes the witch forever from the region. (Note: In their coverage of the production in 1915 and 1916, trade publications and newspapers describe two dramatically different endings to the film. The version more often given is that Zora in the final scenes is released by officials but is permanently "cast out" from her village and the territory. Some other publications, however, such as The Sun in Baltimore and the New York-based trade journals The Moving Picture World and Motion Picture News, state in their reviews that she is burned at the stake at the film's conclusion.)

== Cast ==
- Nance O'Neil as Zora Fernandez
- Alfred Hickman as General Mendoza
- Frank Russell as General Fernandez
- Macey Harlam as Pedro
- Ada Neville as Isha
- Jane Miller as Dolores Mendoza
- Sadie Gross as Dancer
- Stuart Holmes as Undetermined Role
- Harry Kendall as Undetermined Role
- Victor Benoit as Undetermined Role
- Robert Payne as Undetermined Role
- June Janin as Undetermined Role
- Adah Sherman as Undetermined Role
- Salvatore Maltess as Undetermined Role

== Production ==
The film's 1916 copyright registration (LP7713) confirms that director and "scenarist" Frank Powell based his script on Victorien Sardou's play La Sorcière, which had premiered in Paris at the Théâtre Sarah Bernhardt on December 15, 1903. The original plot of Sardou's play, as presented in Paris, was set in sixteenth-century Toledo, Spain, with the sorceress "Zorraya" portrayed as being of Moorish ancestry. (Note: In its coverage of the play's 1903 Parisian premiere, The New York Times refers to the central character as "Zorroya", although the correct spelling of the character's name in Sardou's original work is "Zorraya". See the 1904 published French script of La sorcière.) For his film adaptation, Powell made numerous changes to the French dramatist's plot, such as relocating the story to Mexico, advancing its time setting to the early 1900s, simplifying the spelling of Zorroya's name to "Zora", and portraying her as a Mexican native.

=== Casting ===
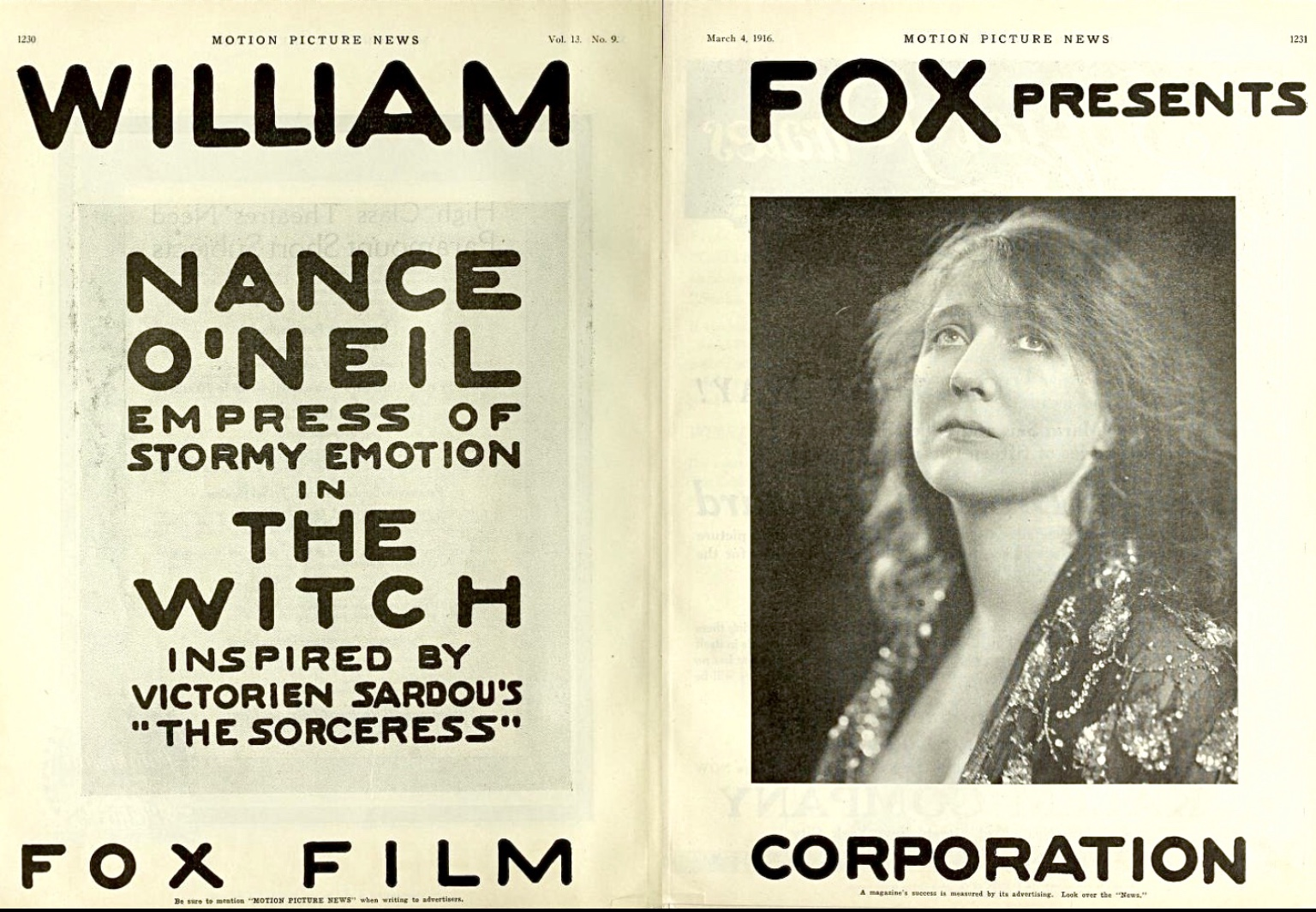
Promotion of O'Neil as the "Empress of Stormy Emotion", Motion Picture News, March 1916

Powell's casting of Nance O'Neil in the title role was viewed by the media and by film studios as a wise and somewhat expected choice given O'Neil's acting reputation as "America's Sarah Bernhardt" and her previous experience portraying Zorraya in stage productions of La Sorcière. The respected American playwright and stage director David Belasco declared O'Neil at the time of the film's production to be "the greatest of America's emotional actresses". The Arizona Republican was one of many newspapers and trade publications in 1916 that expressed interest in seeing her perform the role on screen rather than on stage:

Miss O'Neil played this part so long and carried it to such triumphant heights in the world of stage art, that it has almost become a part of her. Naturally, to be cast in a character so long and so wonderfully played by her, makes this picture of greater importance than it would be under different conditions.

Stuart Holmes was one of many cast members in The Witch whose role is not clearly identified in published production updates or in reviews. The March 6, 1916 issue of the Courier-Journal in Louisville, Kentucky does at least provide some information about the scope of Holmes' part. In a profile of the film under "At The Theaters", the newspaper reports, "Stuart Holmes, picturesque in Mexican costuming, has a small part to which he gives distinction by riding a horse as if he and the horse were one."

For his film's battle sequences, crowd scenes, and to populate the production's large Mexican-village set, Powell hired and costumed hundreds of extras or "supernumones". The director promised to pay each of them "a sandwich at noon and a dollar at night" ($1 then now worth $32) for a day's work at Fox's studio in Fort Lee, New Jersey. In early August 1915, Motion Picture News reported that New Jersey police had detained and questioned "three hundred or more extras" for The Witch as they disembarked from a New York ferry at Fort Lee to proceed to the studio. The officers, according to the weekly journal, mistook the "mob" to be part of the thousands of employees who that summer were waging a violent strike against a Standard Oil Company plant in Bayonne. After causing a near "riot" for delaying the extras, the police finally allowed them to continue to Fox to earn their sandwiches and dollars.

=== Filming and set design ===
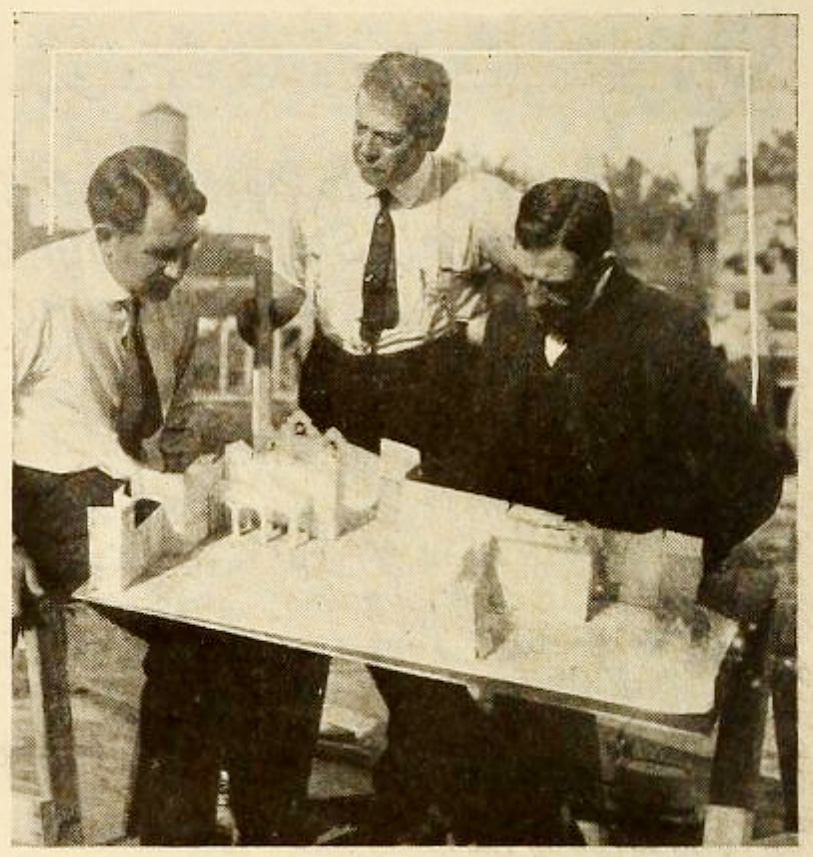
Powell (left) examining set model of Mexican village with Turner (center) and Bach, summer 1915

Other than a week to ten days filming in and around Gilboa, NY (June 16-26, 1915), the entire production was filmed in Fort Lee at Fox's facilities located near the intersection of Main Street and Linwood Avenue. Rather than going on location, traveling from New Jersey to Mexico with a large company of actors, crew, and other support personnel, Powell in the early months of 1915 had decided to send his scenic designer, J. Alan Turner, to Mexico to locate, photograph, and sketch the architecture, attire, and daily activities in a "typical village" there. Then, on his return to Fort Lee, Turner supervised the construction on Fox studio's backlot a 10-acre set with full-size replicas of the Mexican buildings he had documented in San José in Sonora. The trade journal Motion Picture News regularly updated its readers on the production's development, noting that Powell spent more than $10,000 ($318,000 today) on the Mexican set. "The village", it reported, "is the result of the joint efforts of Mr. Powell himself, J. Alan Turner, who is known as a builder of expositions, and William Bach, the technical director of the Fox studios".

The film's battle sequences and other outdoor scenes were shot in Fort Lee between late June and early August 1915, over six months prior to the five-reeler's release. It is likely that Powell chose New Jersey's summer months to film in order to present on screen a landscape that most theater audiences in 1916 would view as a generally plausible setting for Mexico. Impressed by the sheer scale of the production, The Arizona Republican remarked that Powell "spared no time or expense" in developing his project, noting that "Villages were built, forests were blown up with dynamite, great battle scenes were put on...and months were consumed in rehearsals and filming the various scenes."

== Release and promotion ==
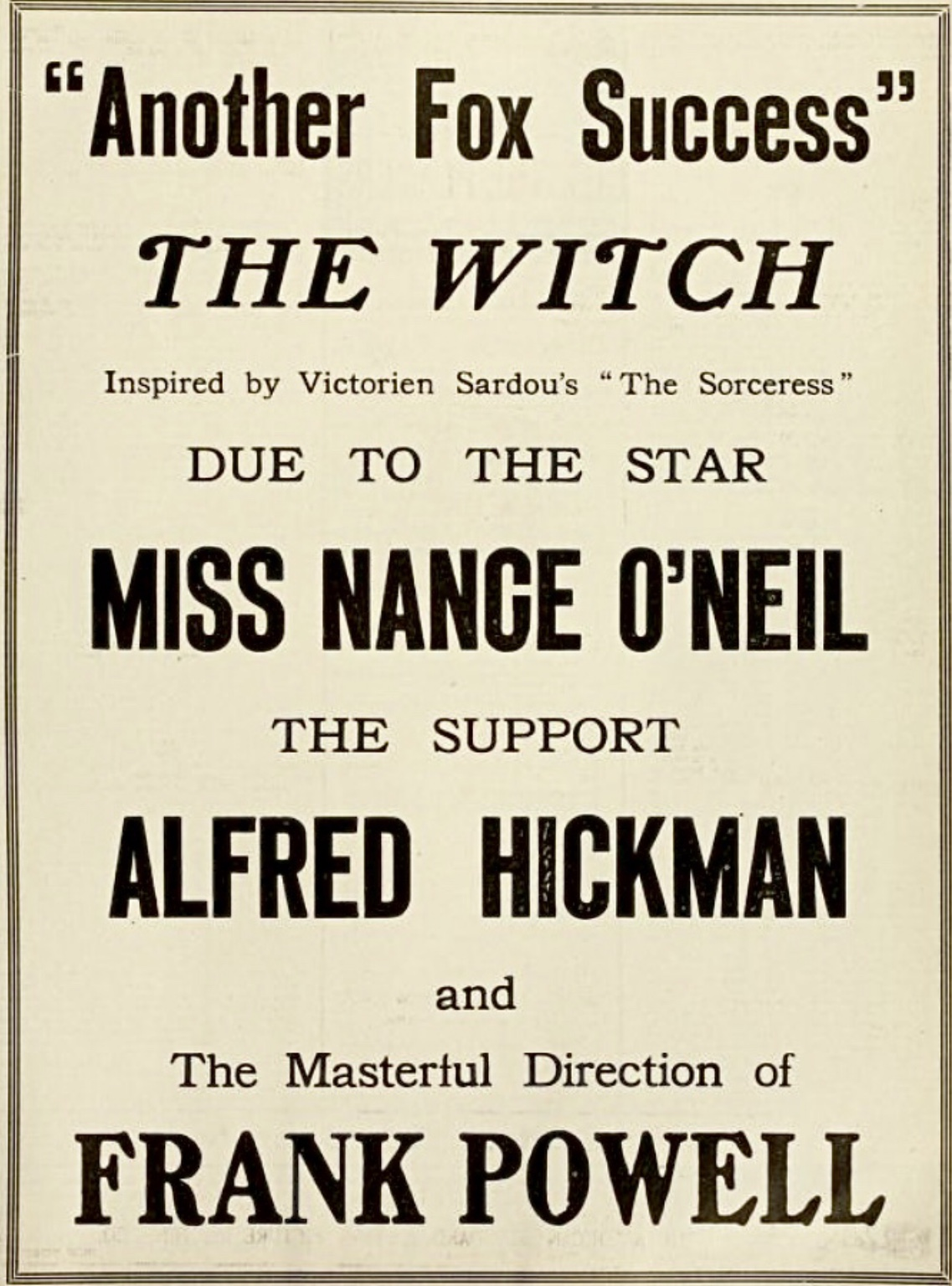
Advertisement in The Moving Picture World, March 1916

Fox Film Corporation heavily promoted The Witch in trade publications during the last quarter of 1915 and into the following year. After the film was finally released in late February 1916, varying descriptions in the media about the film's ending suggest that Powell created two different conclusions for his production and, at least initially, distributed two versions of The Witch, possibly anticipating that some communities would object to the more sensational final scenes and bar their screening. The Baltimore newspaper The Sun recounts one version a week after the film's release:

...At the last instant the Governor stays the burning of Zora at the stake and promises Zora her freedom if she will bring Dolores from her cataleptic state. Zora believing the promise, goes to the palace and arouses the girl. When Dolores is safe the Governor throws Zora into prison. Riques, who realizes that he loves Zora more than Dolores, runs away with her. The two are captured after a desperate fight and in the end Zora is put to death by burning at the stake.

The Moving Picture World in its coverage of the film's release also informs its readers that Zora "is put to death" at the end of the story. In Louisville, Kentucky, the reviewer for The Courier-Journal apparently saw the same tragic, fiery ending as well, for the newspaper's film critic reports that after Riques and the witch are captured "Zora calmly pays the penalty." Yet, the "photoplay" critic George Graves for the Chicago trade journal Motography and Joshua Lowe of the widely read New York-based entertainment paper Variety describe an entirely different finale to the film, one that is more commonly cited in the media in 1916. Graves simply says that after Zora awakens Dorores "the witch is set free." Lowe in his March 3 review expresses his frustration with that same "vague" ending and even speculates that Powell had created another version of the closing scenes:

Just what becomes of Zora in the end is left to the imagination, nothing being told. She is simply shown being cast out. The impression is created that a more definite finish was made and proved unsatisfactory and was discarded in the assembling of the feature.

It is certainly possible that Powell created and even released two versions of the film given his experiences with controversies and post-release cuts to two other films he directed and Fox released in 1915, just prior to The Witch going into production: A Fool There Was and The Devil's Daughter, both starring Theda Bara. In its coverage of the production of The Witch in the summer of 1915, Motion Picture News describes Nance O'Neil being emotionally and physically overwhelmed during filming by the realism of her execution scene: "So convincing in fact that Miss O'Neil, whom they burn as a witch, actually fainted at the stake after being jostled over the heads of the angry crowd".

== Reception ==
The film in 1916 received generally positive or mixed reviews in trade publications and newspapers in various regions of the United States. Variety found the production's battle scenes and sets impressive and its "photography and acting all that could be desired." The trade paper, however, did take issue with some important aspects of the film, most notably with what it viewed as its vague ending and its culturally disconnected, anachronistic costume choices for O'Neil:

Considerable mechanical construction must have been required to give the effect of a Mexican village. In fact, the director, Frank Powell, has gone to no end of trouble to secure proper scenic and sartorial detail. But just why Miss Nance O'Neil, the star, should be clad in Cleopatra fashion and sleep in her B.C. regalia is not explained.

Peter Milne of Motion Picture News describes the film overall as "a strong feature" in his March 11, 1916 review, although he does find the story hampered in parts by "overcrowding" with too many characters and too few closeups to help theater audiences distinguish individual players.

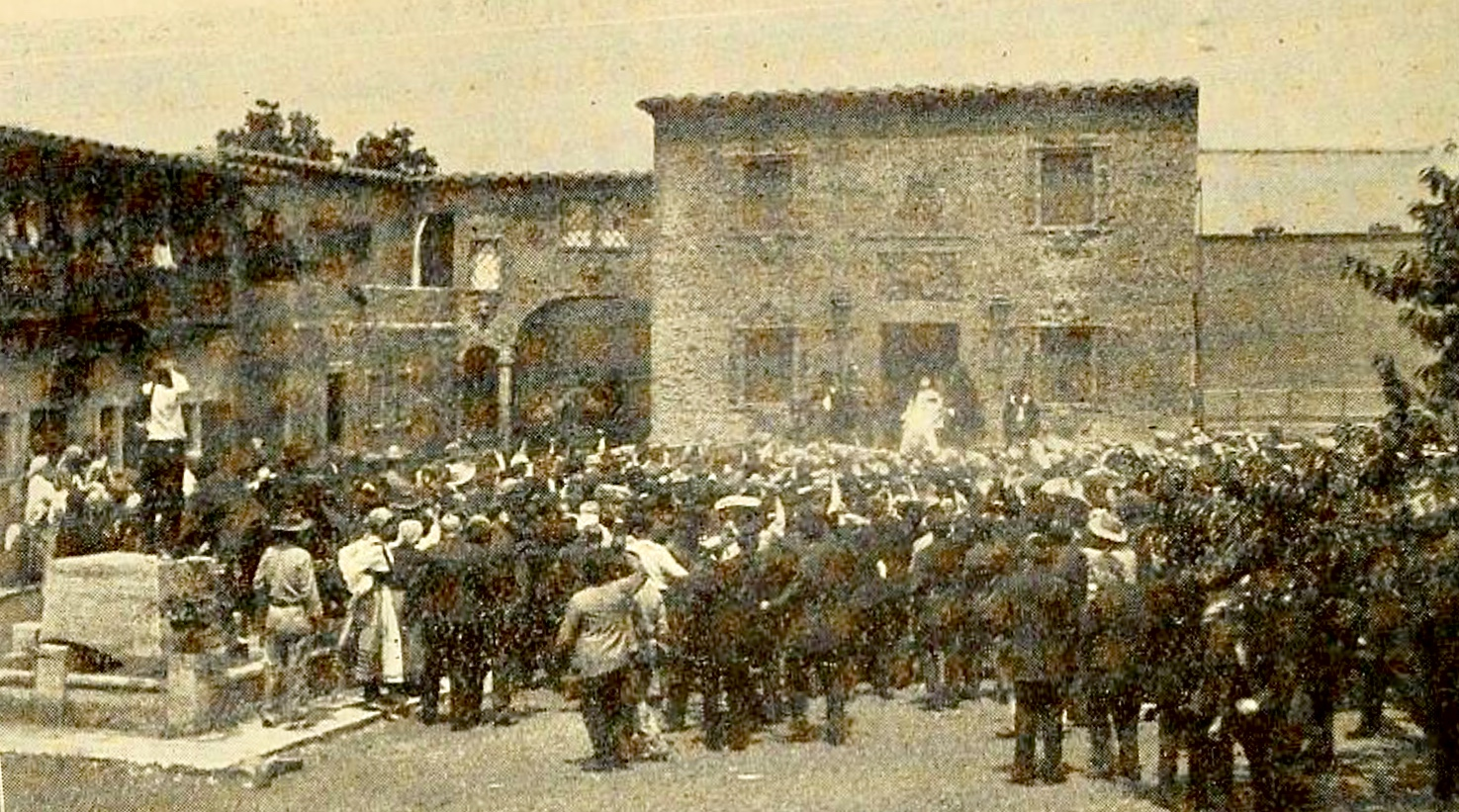
Still of the "Great Mob Scene" that shows part of the Mexican-village set and some of the hundreds of extras who earned "a sandwich" and one dollar a day for their work.

The Moving Picture World had a mixed reaction to the film as well. The publication found its storyline "not in itself convincing" but predicted that most moviegoers would be satisfied by all the action on screen, by what it termed as the "stir and bustle and thunder in it." Motography judged The Witch to be a "spectacular production" with "a powerful story". In a more indepth review in the March 26 issue of Motography, the journal's "photoplay" critic George Graves describes how "the general excellence" of the acting, direction, and sets of the production overcome "weak spots here and there in the film". Reviews in city and regional newspapers in 1916 are largely positive too, with many of those news outlets focusing attention on O'Neil's performance and on the film's elaborate action scenes. In Connecticut, the Hartford Courant titles its review "Nance O'Neil In Strange Picture" but states that the "startling drama" is made remarkable "by Miss O'Neil's intense emotional acting". The Sun in Baltimore entices moviegoers to see the film by headlining its review with the production's sensational elements, such as "Nance O'Neil Burned At The Stake", along with "Battles, Mobs, Hypnotism, Treachery And Love".

== "Lost" film status ==
No full prints or partial reels of the film are preserved in the Library of Congress, the UCLA Film Archives, in the collection of moving images at the Museum of Modern Art, the George Eastman Museum, or in European film repositories. In its 2019 list of lost feature films released in the United States between 1912 and 1929, the Library of Congress includes The Witch. Stills from the production, in addition to those depicted on this page, do survive as illustrations in 1915 and 1916 publications and provide a visual record of the general content of some scenes in the film.

== See also ==
- List of films about witchcraft

== See also ==
- List of lost silent films (1915–1919)
- 1937 Fox vault fire: In Little Ferry, New Jersey in July 1937, a catastrophic fire destroyed more than 40,000 reels of negatives and prints at a storage facility for 20th Century Fox. Besides The Witch, other films directed by Frank Powell and featuring Nance O'Neil were among those extensive losses.
