= Alfred Hickman =

English actor (1873–1931)

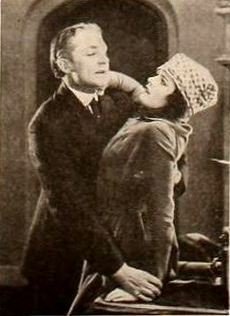
- Hickman and Elaine Hammerstein in The Shadow of Rosalie Byrnes (1920)
- Born: 25 February 1873; London, England
- Died: 9 April 1931 (aged 58); Hollywood, California, U.S.
- Occupation: Actor
- Years active: 1914–1931
- Spouses: Blanche Walsh (m. 1896; div. 1903) Nance O'Neil (m. 1916)

Alfred Hickman (25 February 1873 – 9 April 1931) was an English actor. He was married to actress Nance O'Neil. He appeared in 35 films between 1914 and 1931.

== Career ==
Hickman began his career as an actor on the British stage in the early 1890s. In 1894 he portrayed Valentine in William Shakespeare's Twelfth Night at Daly's Theatre. He first came to prominence on the American stage as William Bagot in Paul M. Potter's Trilby; a role which he performed in its premiere at the Boston Museum and for his Broadway debut at the Garden Theatre in 1895 . He returned to Broadway numerous times over the next three decades, including performing the roles of Hawtrey Treebohm and Lawrence Trenwithou in Tommy Rot (1902) Venderhyphen Jenks in Nancy Brown (1903), and Dr. McPhail in Rain (1926).

== Selected filmography ==
- Are You a Mason? (1915)
- A Woman's Past (1915)
- The Flames of Johannis (1916) (*writer)
- The Witch (1916)
- The Iron Woman (1916)
- The Fall of the Romanovs (1917)
- The Lone Wolf (1917)
- The Final Payment (1917)
- The Passing of the Third Floor Back (1918)
- The Venus Model (1918)
- On the Quiet (1918)
- In Pursuit of Polly (1918)
- The Make-Believe Wife (1918)
- Little Miss Hoover (1918)
- The Love Cheat (1919)
- Piccadilly Jim (1919)
- Erstwhile Susan (1919)
- The Fear Market (1920)
- The Shadow of Rosalie Byrnes (1920)
- Civilian Clothes (1920)
- The Enchanted Cottage (1924)
- The Rescue (1929)
- The Last of the Lone Wolf (1930)
- The Phantom of Paris (1931)
