= Clifford Bruce =

Canadian actor

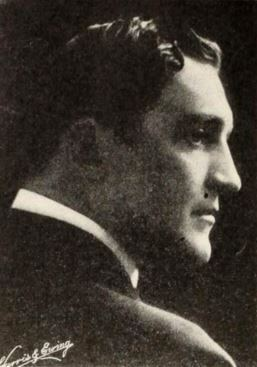
- From a 1919 magazine
- Born: 1885; Toronto, Ontario, Canada
- Died: 27 August 1919 (aged 33–34); West Camp, New York, United States
- Occupation: Actor
- Years active: 1913–1919 (film)

Clifford Bruce (1885–1919) was a Canadian film actor of the silent era.

== Selected filmography ==
- When Rome Ruled (1914)
- A Fool There Was (1915)
- Lady Audley's Secret (1915)
- A Woman's Past (1915)
- The Weakness of Strength (1916)
- The Devil at His Elbow (1916)
- Blue Jeans (1917)
- The Siren (1917)
- The Sin Woman (1917)
- The Barricade (1917)
- The Final Payment (1917)
- The Winding Trail (1918)
- Breakers Ahead (1918)
- The Racing Strain (1918)
- Riders of the Night (1918)
- A Weaver of Dreams (1918)
- Black Is White (1920)

== Bibliography ==
- Solomon, Aubrey. The Fox Film Corporation, 1915-1935: A History and Filmography. McFarland, 2011.
