= The Racing Strain (1918 film) =

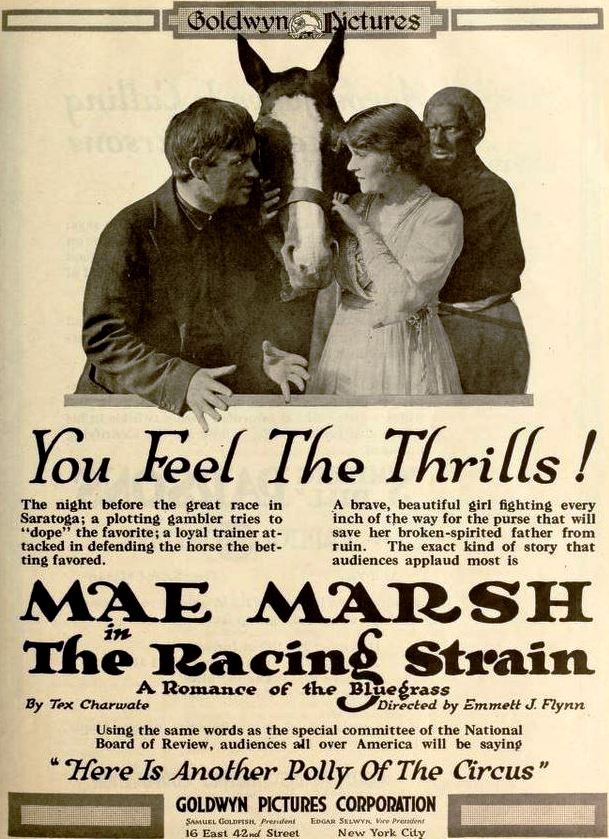
- An advertisement for the film
- Directed by: Emmett J. Flynn
- Written by: Tex Charwate
- Starring: Mae Marsh; Clarence Oliver; Clifford Bruce
- Cinematography: Oliver T. Marsh
- Production company: Goldwyn Pictures
- Distributed by: Goldwyn Pictures
- Release date: December 22, 1918
- Running time: 5 reels
- Country: United States
- Language: Silent (English intertitles)

The Racing Strain is a 1918 silent drama film directed by Emmett J. Flynn. It was produced by Goldwyn Pictures.

== Plot ==
Colonel Cameron, a Kentucky horseman, is fast nearing financial ruin a victim of a New York wildcat stock manipulator, “Big Jim” De Luce. The Colonel’s daughter. Lucille meets Jim for the first time at a Red Cross lawn fete she gives on her father's estate. He showers her with attention, but she repulses him. At the same event she is introduced to Lieut. Gregory Haines, who, unknown to the Camerons, holds a mortgage on the Cameron home. His attempts to win her affection prove far more successful.

As one of the features of the fete, Lucille raffles off Southern Pride, the only horse remaining of the Colonel’s once famous stable. The filly sprained a tendon in her last race and the Colonel subsequently expressed forgetfulness of ever racing her again.

Strangely enough, Lucille is winner of the raffle. She is now much in love with Haines and De Luce is angered. He learns that Haines is the owner of the mortgage and informs the Colonel, who later apprises Lucille of the facts. Haines has previously told his lawyer to withhold the name the man who holds the mortgage. He is ordered from the house by low with the butt of his gun. While Haines has De Luce covered. Lucille forces him to put up $12,000 against some worthless stock he has unloaded on her father as a wager on the race.

An hour later Southern Pride wins the big event and Lucille leaps into Haines’ arms.

== Cast ==
- Mae Marsh as Lucille Cameron
- Clarence Oliver as Gregory Haines
- Clifford Bruce as Jim De Luce
- William T. Carleton as Colonel Cameron
- Eddie Sturgis as Schuyler
- Tammany Young as Johnny Tweed

== Reception ==
A reviewer in the Duluth News Tribune gave the film a positive review, praising Mae Marsh's performance.

== Preservation ==
It is not known whether the film currently survives.
