= The New Adventures of J. Rufus Wallingford =

1915–1916 film serial

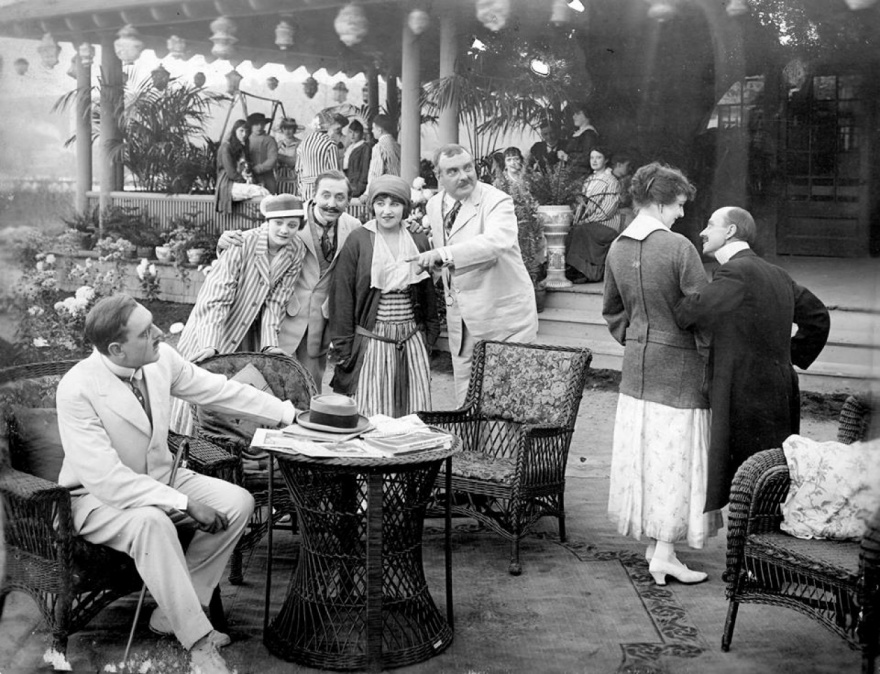
- Center, from left to right: Frances White, Max Figman, Lolita Robertson, and Burr McIntosh.
- Directed by: James Gordon; Leopold Wharton; Theodore Wharton
- Written by: George Randolph Chester; Charles W. Goddard; George B. Seitz
- Produced by: Leopold Wharton; Theodore Wharton
- Starring: Burr McIntosh; Max Figman
- Cinematography: Ray June
- Country: United States
- Language: Silent (English intertitles)

The New Adventures of J. Rufus Wallingford is a 1915–1916 American silent serial film produced by the Wharton Studio in Ithaca, New York, and starring Burr McIntosh and Max Figman. The serial is based on the character J. Rufus Wallingford, originating from the series of stories by George Randolph Chester.

== Cast ==
=== Principal cast (all episodes) ===
- Burr McIntosh as J. Rufus "Jim" Wallingford
- Max Figman as Horace "Blackie" Daw
- Lolita Robertson as Violet Warden
- Frances White as Fanny Warden

=== Supporting cast (various episodes) ===
- Dick Bennard
- Harry Carr
- Joseph Colburn
- Oliver Hardy (credited as O. N. Hardy)
- Malcolm Head
- Harry Mainhall as Benzy Falls Jr.
- Dana T. Morley as Edward Robinson
- Allan Murnane as Andre Perigourd
- Edward O'Connor as Onion Jones
- Violet Palmer
- Edward Redway as Edward Bang
- Harry Robinson
- F. W. Stewart
- Lawrence Wood

Although Frederic de Belleville was originally announced for the part of Wallingford, he was replaced before filming began by journalist, photographer, and stage actor Burr McIntosh. The roles of Blackie Daw and Violet Warden were played by husband-and-wife acting team Max Figman and Lolita Robertson.

Among the supporting cast was young Oliver Hardy, then 23 years old but already an experienced actor who had appeared in more than 60 silent comedies produced by the Lubin Manufacturing Company in 1914 and 1915. Hardy was cast in at least four of the first five episodes of Wallingford, and perhaps more, although in most cases his appearance in publicity stills is the only evidence for his participation, since the films themselves do not survive. An exception is episode 5 (The Lilac Splash), in which he plays a burglar caught by Wallingford and Daw and outwitted in a crooked game of poker. He is not known to have appeared in any subsequent episodes, and by the fall of 1915 he had moved on to other work.

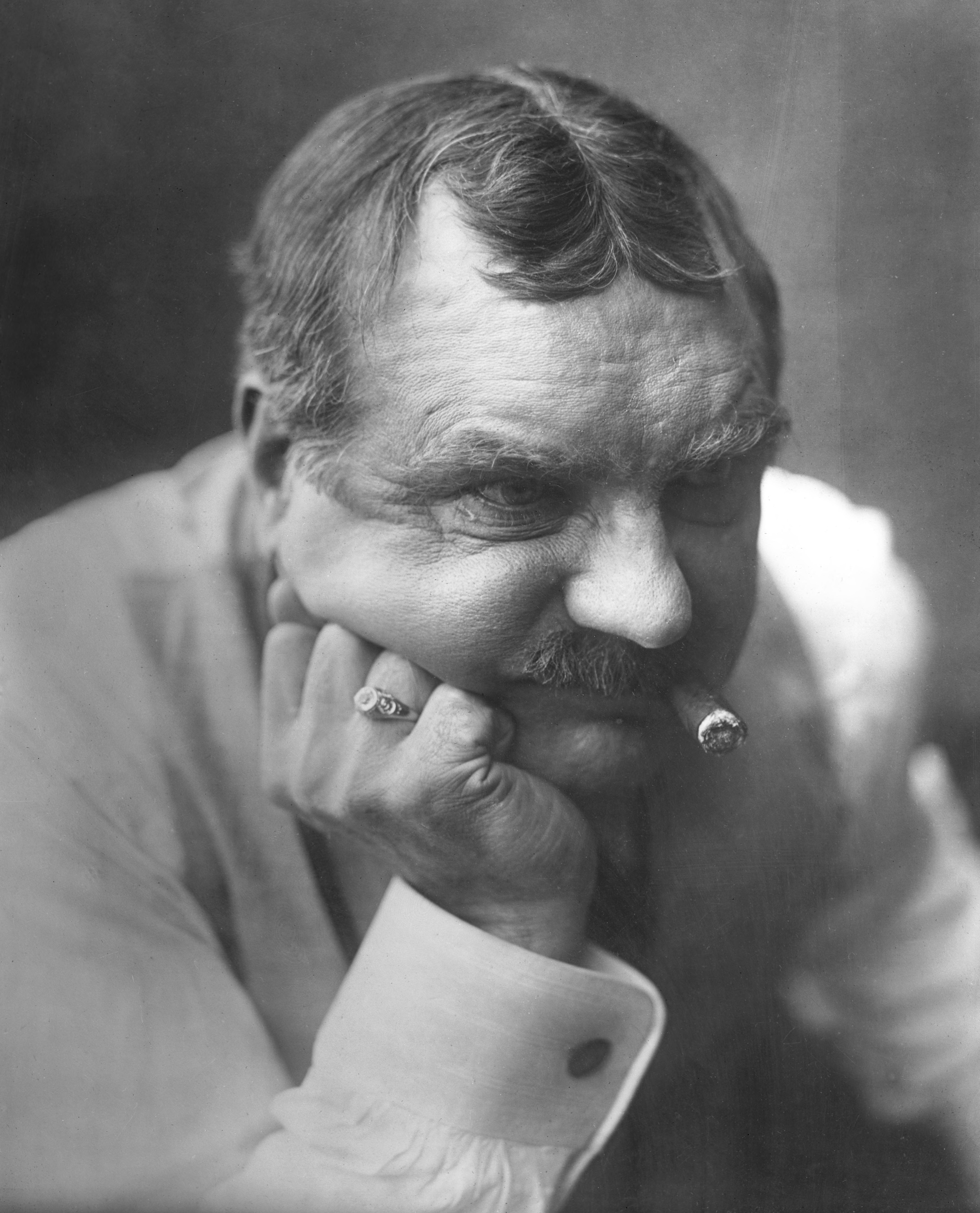
Burr McIntosh as Wallingford

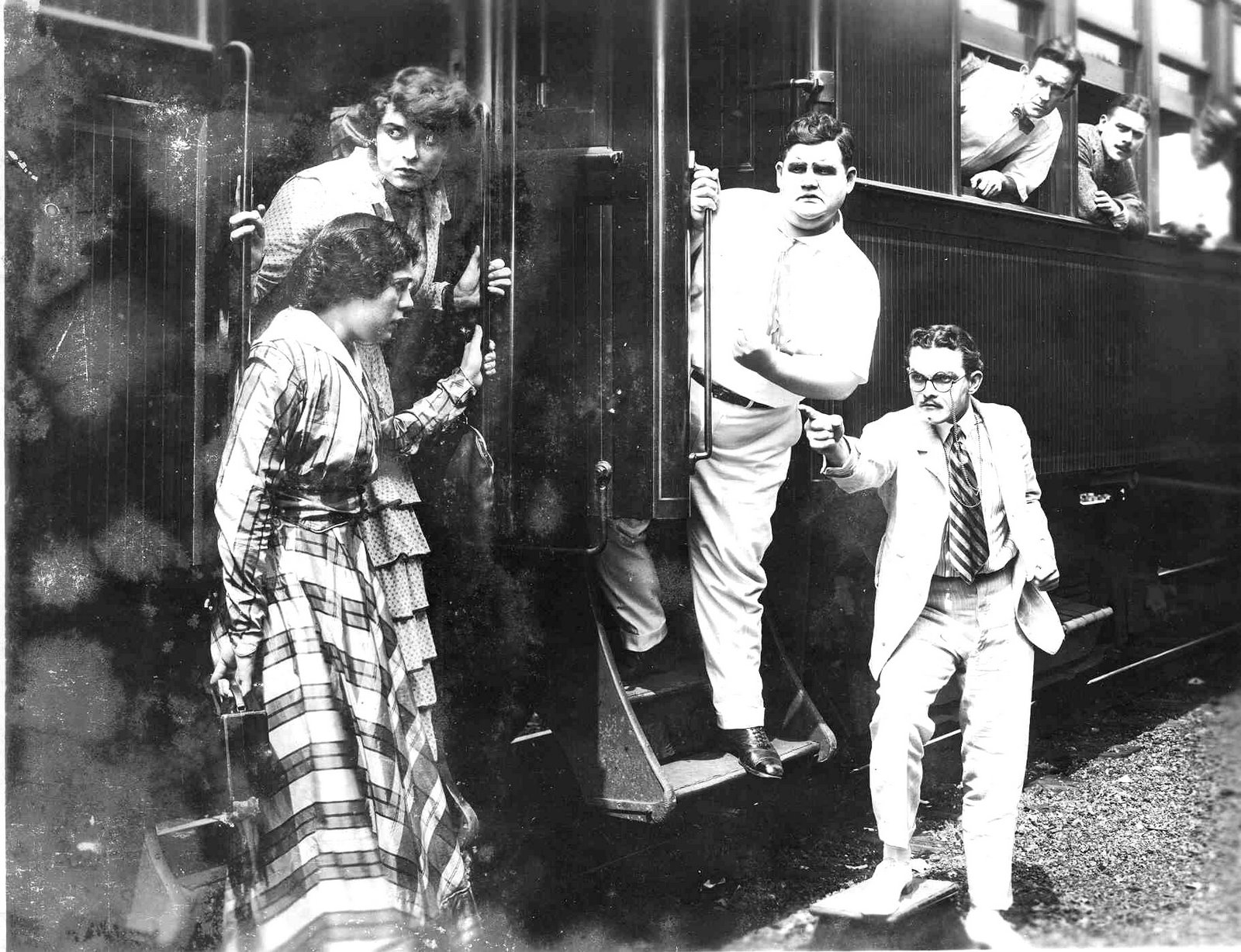
Lolita Robertson, Frances White,
Oliver Hardy, and Harry Mainhall, Jr.

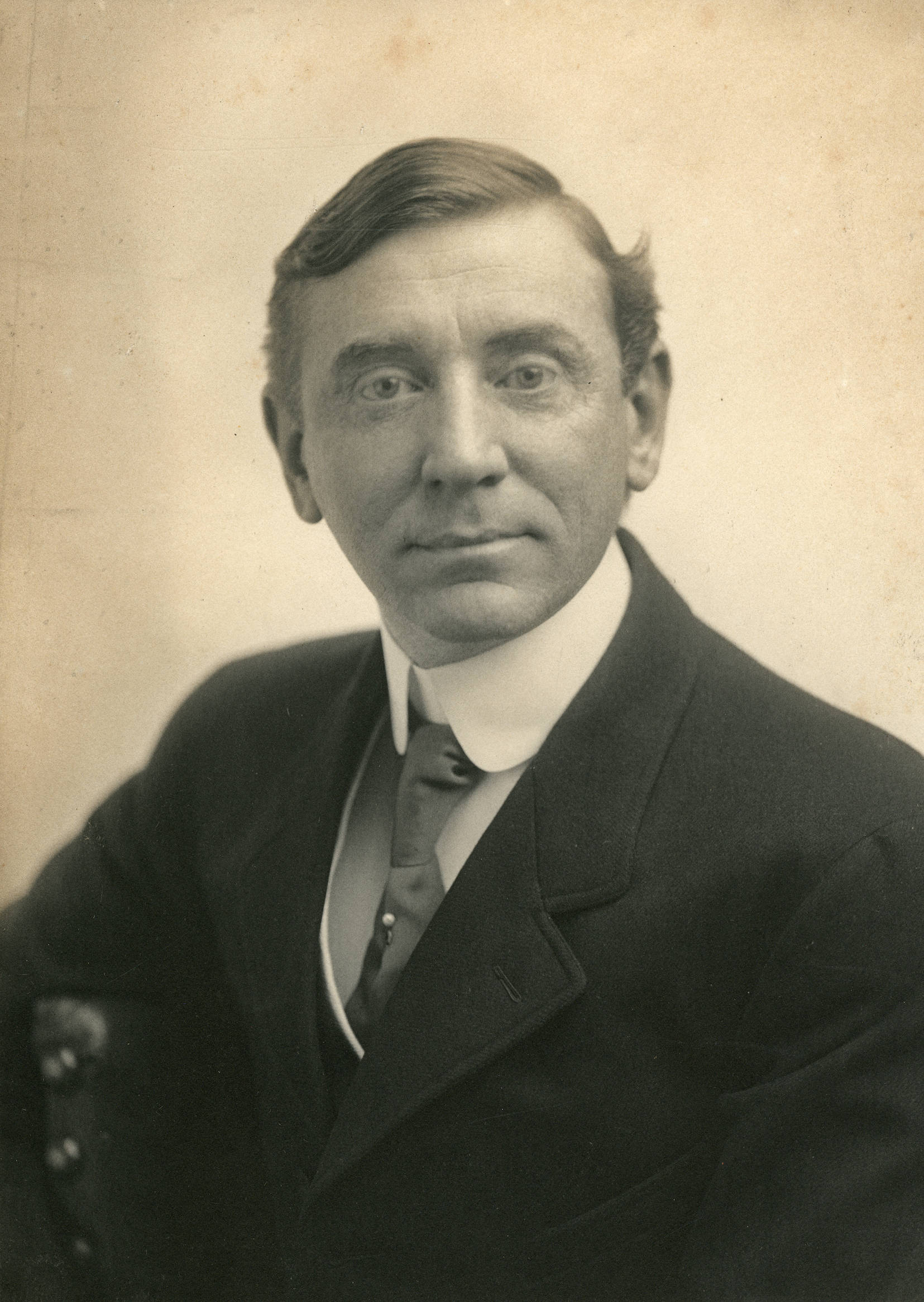
Max Figman as Horace "Blackie" Daw

== Plot ==
Wallingford and his friend and accomplice Horace "Blackie" Daw are amiable con men who travel the country promoting fraudulent financial schemes. In the Wharton serial, they are approached by two orphans, Violet and Fanny Warden, who have been cheated out of their inheritance by a clique of corrupt businessmen. Wallingford and Daw agree to help them, using their talents as swindlers to trick the unscrupulous financiers and recover the money. Although the stories are connected, each film is self-contained and focuses on a different member of the clique.

== Background ==
Wallingford was the first comedy silent film serial. It followed on the success of the Wharton studio's dramatic serial The Exploits of Elaine, and its sequel The New Exploits of Elaine, both of which had been inspired by the enormous popularity of The Perils of Pauline, produced by William Randolph Hearst in 1914. The new comedy serial was based on the character of J. Rufus Wallingford, the subject of a series of stories by George Randolph Chester, which first appeared in The Cosmopolitan magazine and were subsequently collected in the book Get-Rich-Quick Wallingford: A Cheerful Account of the Rise and Fall of an American Business Buccaneer, published in 1908. The stories had already inspired a stage play by George M. Cohan in 1910, and there were other film adaptations in 1914, 1916, 1921, and 1931.

== Production ==
The serial was produced by the brothers Theodore and Leopold Wharton and filmed chiefly at the Wharton Studio, located in Renwick Park (now Stewart Park) in Ithaca, New York. Filming began in July 1915, and the finished films were released between October 1915 and February 1916. Fourteen episodes were produced, each two reels long (running time approximately 20 minutes). Most of them are now lost or are preserved only in fragments. The titles of the individual films are:

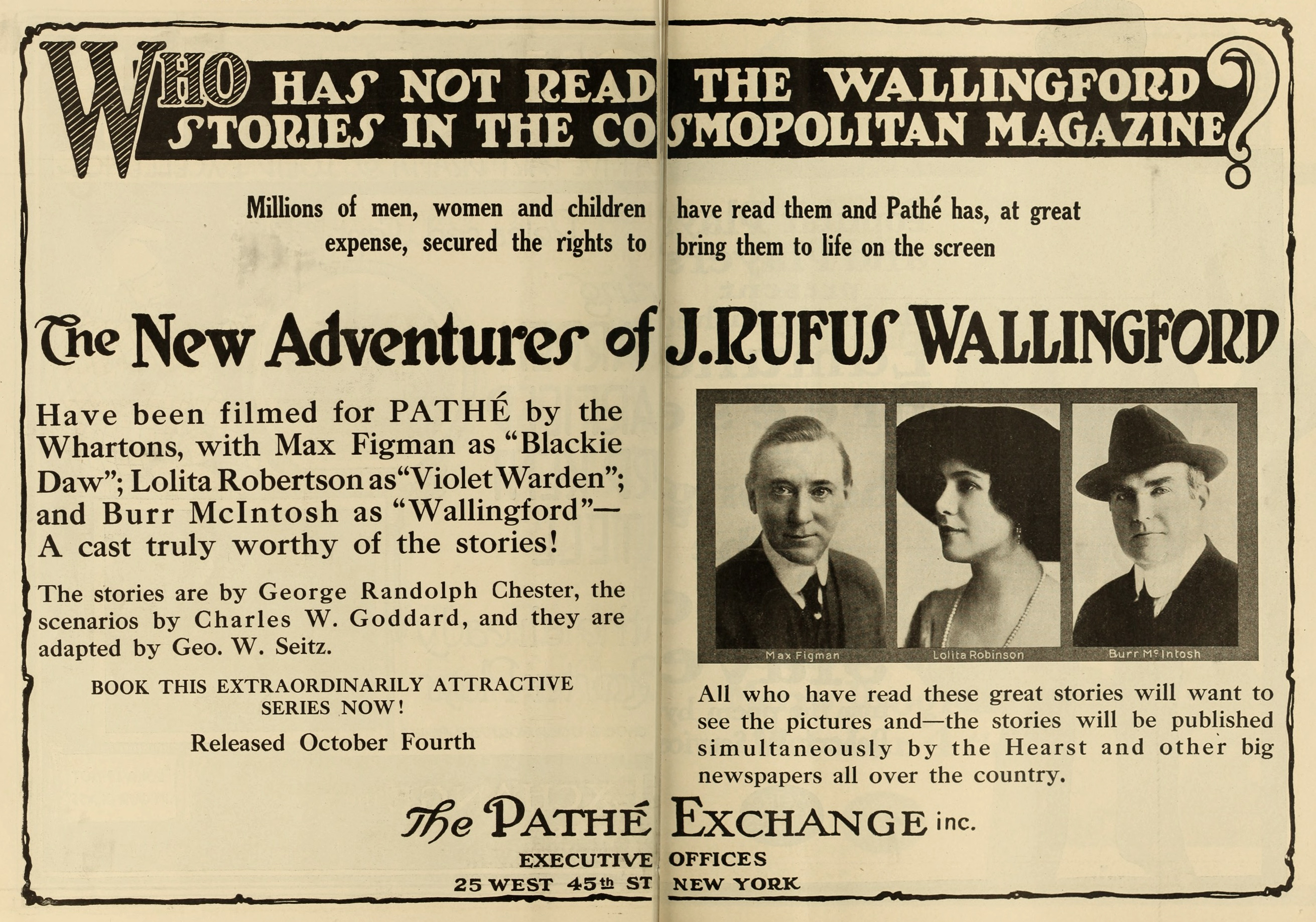
Advertisement in Motion Picture World (October 2, 1915)

1. The Bungalow Bungle
2. Three Rings and a Goat
3. A Rheumatic Joint
4. The Master Stroke
5. The Lilac Splash
6. A Trap for Trapp
7. The Bang Sun Engine
8. A Transaction in Summer Boarders
9. Detective Blackie
10. Apples and Eggbeaters
11. A Stony Deal
12. Buying a Bank with Bunk
13. The Missing Heir
14. Lord Southpaugh

== Reception ==
The film adaptation of Chester's popular Wallingford stories was eagerly anticipated. In July 1915, when production began, Motion Picture News wrote that "The big promoter of shady financial schemes is so peculiarly American, his character is so well drawn, and his adventures so startingly original and humorous that the series should make wonderfully attractive pictures." The films were heavily promoted in the trade papers and each episode was reviewed as if it were an independent feature .

Critical reception was generally good: in response to the first episode, The Dramatic Mirror wrote that "Max Figman makes a thoroughly delightful Blackie Daw, and Burr McIntosh displays the suave smooth unctuousness of George Randolph Chester's mythical character in a manner so convincing that one almost imagines that he has just stepped from the pages of the book." A few reviewers dissented, however, with Variety noting that the emphasis on financial chicanery would have little appeal to women or children, since "women as a rule who go to the pictures have no head nor inclination for 'business'."

== Preservation and home video release ==
Surviving footage from The Lilac Splash

In 2020 a newly restored version of The Lilac Splash, the fifth episode of the serial, was released on Blu-Ray disc by Flicker Alley as part of a collection of solo films of Stan Laurel and Oliver Hardy. The restoration, by Lobster Films in association with the U.S. Library of Congress, was based on the only surviving nitrate print of the film, now in the Library of Congress. It is a shortened version of the original two-reeler, consisting chiefly of the first reel, which includes Oliver Hardy's performance as the burglar. The first reel of The Bang Sun Engine, the seventh episode, is also known to survive, together with shorter fragments from other films in the series.

== See also ==
- List of American films of 1915
- Oliver Hardy filmography

== Sources ==
- Catalog of Copyright Entries: Motion Pictures, 1912-1939, Washington, D.C.: Library of Congress, Copyright Division, 1951.
- Lupack, Barbara Tepa. Silent Serial Sensations: The Wharton Brothers and the Magic of Early Cinema, Ithaca, N.Y.: Cornell University Press, 2020. JSTOR 10.7591
- Rainey, Buck. Serials and Series: A World Filmography, 1912-1956, Jefferson, N.C.: McFarland and Co., 1999, p. 172.
- Spehr, Paul. C. American film personnel and company credits, 1908-1920, Jefferson, N.C.: McFarland and Co., 1996.
- Stone, Rob. Laurel or Hardy: The Solo Films of Stan Laurel and Oliver "Babe" Hardy, Temecula, Calif.: Split Reel Books, 1996.
