= Louis J. Gasnier =

Film director

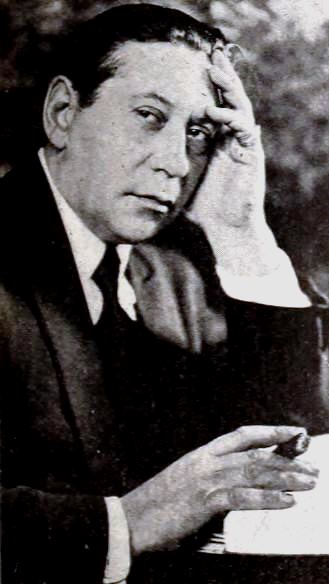
- Gasnier in 1920
- Born: Louis Joseph Gasnier; September 15, 1875; Paris, France
- Died: February 15, 1963 (aged 87); Hollywood, California, U.S.
- Occupation: Film director
- Years active: 1899–1958
- Spouse: Gertrude "Trudy" Ellison

Louis Joseph Gasnier (September 15, 1875 – February 15, 1963) was a French-American film director, producer, screenwriter and stage actor. A cinema pioneer, Gasnier shepherded the early career of comedian Max Linder, co-directed the enormously successful film serial The Perils of Pauline (1914). Gasnier capped his output with the notorious low-budget exploitation film Reefer Madness (1936) which though both a critical and box office failure, became a cult classic.

== Biography ==
Born in Paris, Louis J. Gasnier began his career in the theatre as an actor and director. Accounts vary as to when his film career began; according to Gasnier himself, his association with Pathé Frères commenced in 1899, during the earliest days of the company. Georges Sadoul recognized Gasnier as a member of early French filmmakers known as the 'Vincennes School' which also included Gaston Velle, Georges Hatot, Lucien Nonguet, Lépine, Andre Heuré, Georges Monca, and Albert Capellani. However, Pathé was notoriously stingy with credits in those days, so no credits for Gasnier are known before 1905.

Gasnier's earliest known credits begin through his association with Max Linder, whom he is said to have discovered. Gasnier helmed many of Linder's earliest films and continued to work – sometimes as co-director with Linder – on projects featuring the comic through 1913. Gasnier also directed some films in Italy for Film d'Arte Italiana, a division of Pathé, with some featuring the legendary Italian film diva Francesca Bertini. Sadoul, writing in 1965, commented that Gasnier directed "100 to 200 films from 1909–1914" alone. No established filmography for Gasnier comes even close to such a figure in the stated period, suggesting that there are many French, and perhaps some Italian, films made by him which remain unidentified.

Pathé Frères established a film production company in the United States in 1910 with its construction of a studio in Jersey City. In 1910, Gasnier agreed to go to the United States to head their facility in Fort Lee, New Jersey.

The worldwide success of Gasnier's serial The Perils of Pauline, co-directed with Donald MacKenzie and starring Pearl White, elevated Gasnier to the position of executive vice-president within the American division of Pathé. Gasnier resigned this position in 1916, and established a production company, Astra Film, with writer-director George B. Seitz, which continued to distribute through Pathé. In 1919, Astra Film dropped Pathé as distributor, and went with Robertson-Cole, the predecessor to Film Booking Offices of America. With Seitz' departure, Astra became Louis J. Gasnier Productions, but only a few films were made by this firm before Gasnier was contracted by producer B. P. Schulberg to direct for his Preferred Pictures firm. These years were the highpoint of Gasnier's career; these films were often marketed with his name above the title and some times as a one-word name – "Gasnier". With the public, Gasnier was associated with high adventure in exotic locales, such as what was endemic to serials, or with social melodrama of the kind that was popular in the early 1920s.

In 1925, Preferred Pictures declared bankruptcy, and Gasnier went to work for Tiffany Pictures, not yet the Poverty Row studio that it would ultimately become, but also not a major or prestigious studio. It may have been B. P. Schulberg who rescued Gasnier from Tiffany; despite the bankruptcy, Schulberg had managed to hang onto actress Clara Bow's contract and was now an executive at Paramount Pictures. Gasnier went into the dawn of talking pictures as a Paramount director, though mainly working on their foreign-language productions; his command of the English language – even after living many years in the United States – was at best limited. At Paramount, Gasnier directed foreign versions of mainstream films, and piloted fledgling star Cary Grant through two early roles. Gasnier also made five films featuring the ultimately ill-fated King of the Tango, Carlos Gardel, for release in Argentina. In 1933–34, Gasnier returned to France to direct for Paramount's French division, directing Topaze (1933) under the supervision of playwright Marcel Pagnol; this film marked the screen debut of eminent French stage actor Louis Jouvet.

Paramount did not renew Gasnier's contract in 1935, and he was out of work for some time. Gasnier hastily accepted the first project that came his way, offered to him by producer George A. Hirliman, Tell Your Children, which in time has become known by its reissue title of Reefer Madness. Hirliman had learned that there was money available to support films promoting pending anti-marijuana legislation. Reefer Madness was made at a studio complex that ultimately become the Grand National Pictures facility, and Gasnier elected to stay with Hirliman and Grand National once it went into full-fledged production. Grand National swiftly flopped, and was liquidated in 1939; its studios were taken over by Producers Releasing Corporation; Gasnier did not elect to stay with PRC, but he did remain with Hirliman, finishing out his directorial career with a couple of features at Monogram Pictures and then retiring upon reaching the age of 65.

It proved a long retirement, and in a late interview, Gasnier revealed that he was practically destitute. To make ends meet, Gasnier returned to acting, in small parts, in mainstream features, usually playing an elderly Frenchman. He died at the age of 87 in Hollywood.

== Legacy ==
Louis J. Gasnier was lucky to find himself at the beginning of several key trends in the development of cinema. Max Learns to Skate (1907) could arguably be said to have constituted the beginnings of what would become regarded as classic silent screen comedy. Both The Perils of Pauline and The Exploits of Elaine (1914) were international successes that established the American film serial as a distinct and viable genre. Gasnier's familiarity with serials in Europe helped to infuse the American form with elements of what he had seen abroad. When Gasnier died in 1963, The Perils of Pauline was still frequently seen on television, and would have qualified as his best-known film at that time. Gasnier also directed first-rank stars Clara Bow and Cary Grant in some of their earliest roles, and helmed nearly half of all of Carlos Gardel's films.

By the 2010s, Reefer Madness has by far outpaced The Perils of Pauline in terms of public awareness, and critical reception. Re-released theatrically in 1972, it swiftly attracted a devoted cult following among "midnight movie" fans in the 1970s and 1980s through its showings in repertory cinemas and by college film societies. The public domain film has also become a mainstay on home video and is easily accessed online. Of all the films that Gasnier directed, Reefer Madness was probably the one he would have least liked to have been remembered for. Actress Thelma White—who played "Mae" in the film—once complained that it was a "bomb" and had ruined her film career. For Gasnier, it was merely a stepping stone to Grand National and, therefore, represented his entry into poverty row.

== Controversy ==
Louis J. Gasnier's best-known works, and therefore his reputation, are dogged by various streams of controversy. Max Linder compromised forever his considerable comic legacy through his tragic and incomprehensible death in a double suicide (or suicide-homicide) involving himself and his young wife in 1925. Gasnier's poor English was once blamed for the barely literate subtitles in The Perils of Pauline, but this was debunked in the 1960s by Arthur Charles Miller and William K. Everson.

Although the content of Reefer Madness is generally considered so ludicrous as to be harmless, it has been criticized extensively for its complicity in the passage of the Marihuana Tax Act of 1937, which criminalized marijuana. Reefer Madness is variously dated; the traditional, "old" date was 1937, which has been pushed ahead as late as 1940 in some sources, though 1936 is the convention currently observed. Bret Wood notes that a movie poster in the background of one scene was also used in the Grand National film Something to Sing About, which was released in September 1937. So this suggests a production date of mid-1937, but it appears Reefer Madness was not distributed until 1938 when Dwain Esper placed it on the roadshow circuit. By that time, the Marihuana Tax Act of 1937 had already passed into law, and no print of Reefer Madness has ever been found bearing the title Tell Your Children.

Actor Gary Cooper disliked Gasnier, and his property Darkened Rooms (1929), so much that he refused to participate in the picture, despite threats of suspension from Paramount. In the end, however, it was Paramount that backed down, and the role was reassigned to Neil Hamilton. Gasnier's directorial style was not heavily involved in rich visual content or dynamic editing; he was principally interested in basic storytelling and liked to work in a producer-like, supervisory role. Gasnier often worked in collaboration with additional directors, including Linder, MacKenzie and Seitz mentioned above but also with Leopold Wharton, Theodore Wharton, William Parke, James W. Horne, Colin Campbell, Max Marcin, Charles Barton, and the young George Cukor. The two films that resulted from Gasnier's short-lived Louis J. Gasnier Productions brand were both directed by Horne.

Nevertheless, that does not mean that visual dynamics are altogether absent from Gasnier's movies, and praise for Gasnier's work as director does appear amid contemporary reviews of his films. Upon its theatrical re-release in 1972, underground film maker Jack Smith wrote an appreciation of Reefer Madness for The Village Voice in which he stated that "it is a beautiful film, and everyone in the arts should see it." One reason Reefer Madness is so well known in comparison to Dwain Esper's wild, but amateurish Marihuana or Elmer Clifton's dull, soap operatic Assassin of Youth is that it is a much better-made film than either of those.

Despite being dubbed "consistently mediocre" by the All Movie Guide's Hal Erickson, it remains difficult to evaluate Gasnier's relative strengths and weaknesses as a director based on what survives of his work from the silent period.

== Accessibility ==
Despite the survival of the films mentioned above and some others—including many of the French comedies starring Max Linder and The Mystery of the Double Cross (1917), one of only a few silent American serials to survive complete—losses are heavy amid Gasnier's silent feature productions. There are exceptions; Kismet (1920) featuring legendary stage actor Otis Skinner has survived, as does Gasnier's Preferred Pictures features Poisoned Paradise (1924), with Clara Bow in a supporting role, and Parisian Love (1925), where Bow is the star. Gasnier's version of Maytime (1923)—the first screen adaptation of the Romberg operetta, later remade by Robert Z. Leonard into a vehicle for Nelson Eddy and Jeanette MacDonald—was found along with a cache of American films discovered in New Zealand in 2010. A couple of Gasnier's Tiffany features have been preserved, but little else exists, save fragments and single chapters of Gasnier's serials. Most, if not all, of Gasnier's sound films remain extant.

== Selected filmography ==
=== Director ===
- The Perils of Pauline (1914, serial)
- The Exploits of Elaine (1914, serial)
- The New Exploits of Elaine (1915, serial)
- The Shielding Shadow (1916, serial)
- The Mystery of the Double Cross (1917, serial [William Parke received sole directing credit])
- The Seven Pearls (1917, serial)
- Hands Up (1918, serial)
- The Tiger's Trail (1919, serial)
- Kismet (1920)
- Good Women (1921)
- A Wife's Awakening (1921)
- Silent Years (1921)
- The Call of Home (1922)
- Rich Men's Wives (1922)
- Thorns and Orange Blossoms (1922)
- Daughters of the Rich (1923)
- Mothers-in-Law (1923)
- The Hero (1923)
- Poor Men's Wives (1923)
- Poisoned Paradise: The Forbidden Story of Monte Carlo (1924)
- White Man (1924)
- The Breath of Scandal (1924)
- Wine (1924)
- The Parasite (1925)
- Parisian Love (1925)
- The Boomerang (1925)
- Sin Cargo (1926)
- That Model from Paris (1926)
- Out of the Storm (1926)
- Streets of Shanghai (1927)
- The Beauty Shoppers (1927)
- Fashion Madness (1928)
- Should Tall Men Marry? (1928)
- Darkened Rooms (1929)
- Slightly Scarlet (1930)
- Mysterious Mr. Parkes (1930)
- The Virtuous Sin (1930)
- The Lawyer's Secret (1931)
- Suburban Melody (1933)
- Topaze (1933)
- Espérame (1933)
- Downward Slope (1934)
- Fedora (1934)
- The Tango on Broadway (1934)
- Reefer Madness (1936)
- The Marines Come Thru (1938)
- La Inmaculada (1939)

=== Actor ===
- The Perils of Pauline (1914, serial) - Louis J. Gasnier [Ch. 9]
- What Price Glory (1952) - Brother (uncredited)
- Lafayette Escadrille (1958) - Bartender (uncredited)
- Hell Is for Heroes (1962) - Old Man (uncredited) (final film role)

=== Producer ===
- The Beloved Cheater (1919)
- The Corsican Brothers (1920)
- The Butterfly Man (1920)
- Dangerous Pastime (1922)
