= Wharton Studio =

Film production company

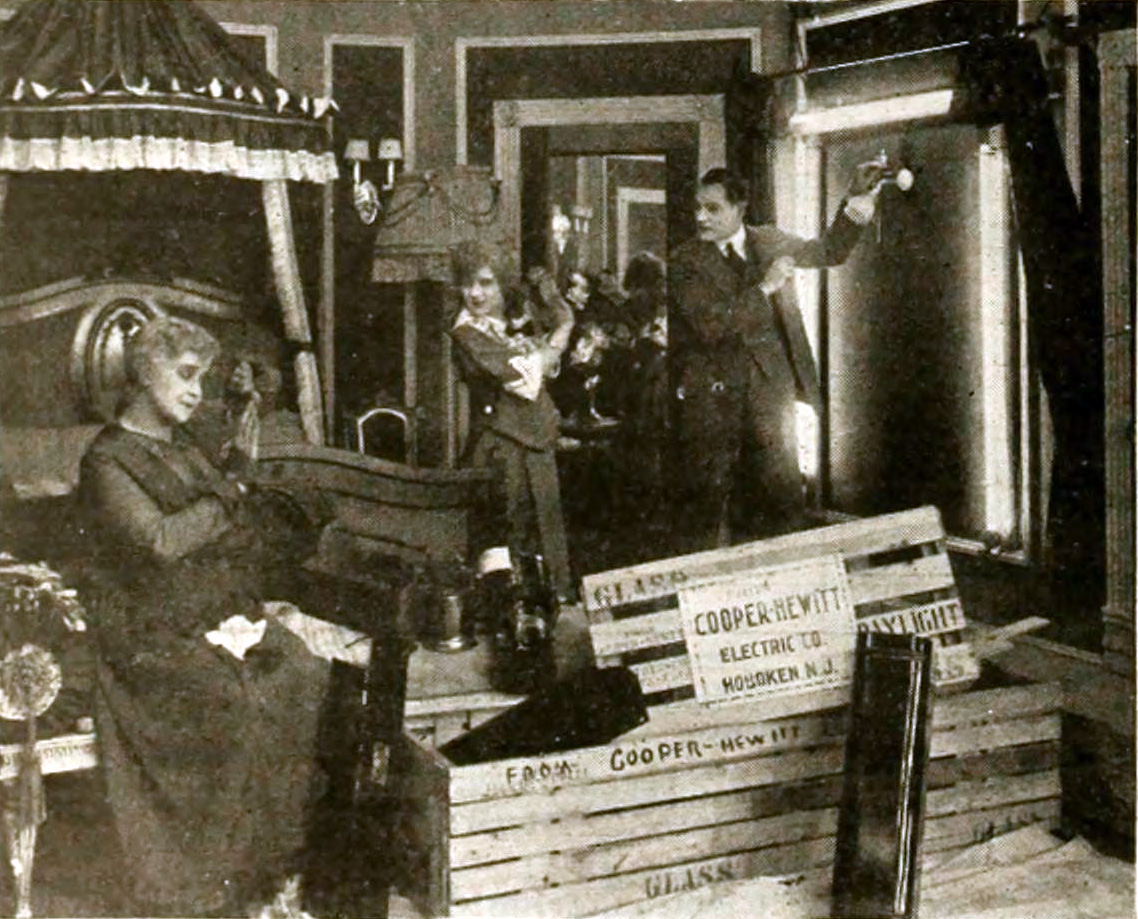
A new stunt used by the Wharton brothers in The Mysteries of Myra (1916).

Wharton, Inc. was an early silent film production company in Ithaca, New York, from 1914 to 1919. One of the first independent regional centers of early filmmaking, the movie studio was established by brothers Theodore and Leopold Wharton on the shores of Cayuga Lake at the site of what is now Stewart Park. Currently, efforts are underway to create a silent movie museum in the former Wharton movie studio building in Stewart Park.

== History ==
=== Ithaca (1912–1920) ===
In late 1912, on his way to visit family in Ludlowville, New York, Theodore filmed a Cornell-Penn college football game for Essanay, the Chicago studio that employed him as a director. Impressed with the singular beauty of the area, he convinced Essanay to allow him to return to Ithaca in the spring of 1913 for a full season of filming with a cast and crew that included such stars as Francis X. Bushman and Beverly Bayne.

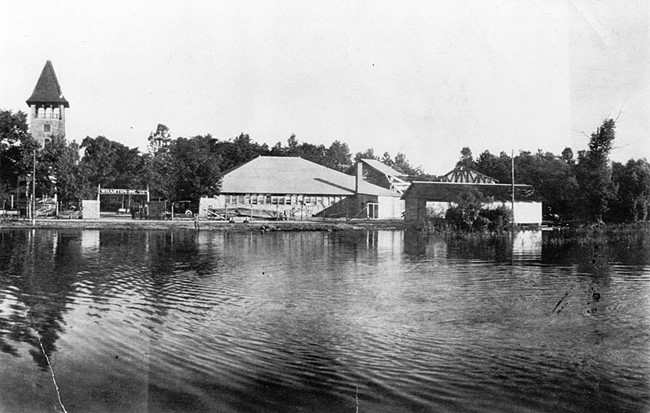
View of Wharton Studio from Cayuga Lake, c. 1915

The following year, Theodore was joined by his older brother Leopold, then a director at Pathé. Together, the two established their eponymous Ithaca studio and began producing short films, serial motion pictures, and eventually a few feature films. Their connections in the industry meant that the brothers were able to attract a number of major stars, many of whom arrived in Ithaca on the overnight train from New York City. Their films were shot on elaborate sets that they created at their studio and in natural sites around Ithaca, including the gorges on the Cornell University campus, and they often used students and local citizens in their casts.

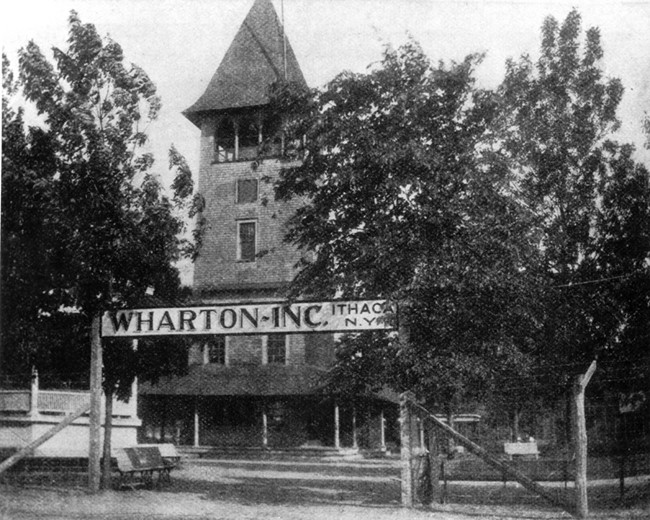
Entrance to Wharton Studio, c. 1915.

=== Later years (1920–1931) ===
Despite the early popular and critical success of their serial productions, by late 1919 the Whartons were in serious financial trouble. Forced to give up their studio (which was sublet first by Grossman Pictures and then by Cayuga Pictures), the brothers parted ways, never to work together again. Leopold left Ithaca first, joining Macklyn Arbuckle at San Antonio Motion Pictures in Texas. Over the next two years, he produced a few minor films, all of them starring Arbuckle. Theodore did not fare much better. Since the majority of the film industry had by then settled in Southern California to capitalize on year-round shooting and to escape the Edison Trust, he headed to Santa Cruz, where Mayor Fred Swanton was promoting and encouraging film production in the city and offering various concessions to filmmakers. Theodore hoped to establish a new studio there that would rival the former Wharton Studios in Ithaca. After several years, though, he left Santa Cruz without producing a single film. Eventually, he moved to Hollywood, where he assumed minor roles as a screenwriter and assistant director.

Leopold died in New York City in 1927. Theodore died a few years later, in 1931, in Los Angeles. The serial films for which the Whartons were renowned in the 1910s had largely fallen out of favor with the moviegoing public; and much of the evidence of the brothers' prolific cinematic career was lost in 1929, when hundreds of their nitrate-based film reels spontaneously combusted in the storage shed at the home of their lawyer. Today, the Wharton Brothers—among the first independent filmmakers to own and operate their own studio—are recognized as pioneers in the early film industry. In 1994, their first and best-known serial The Exploits of Elaine was named to the National Film Registry at the Library of Congress for its cultural and historic significance.

== Films produced at Ithaca Studios ==
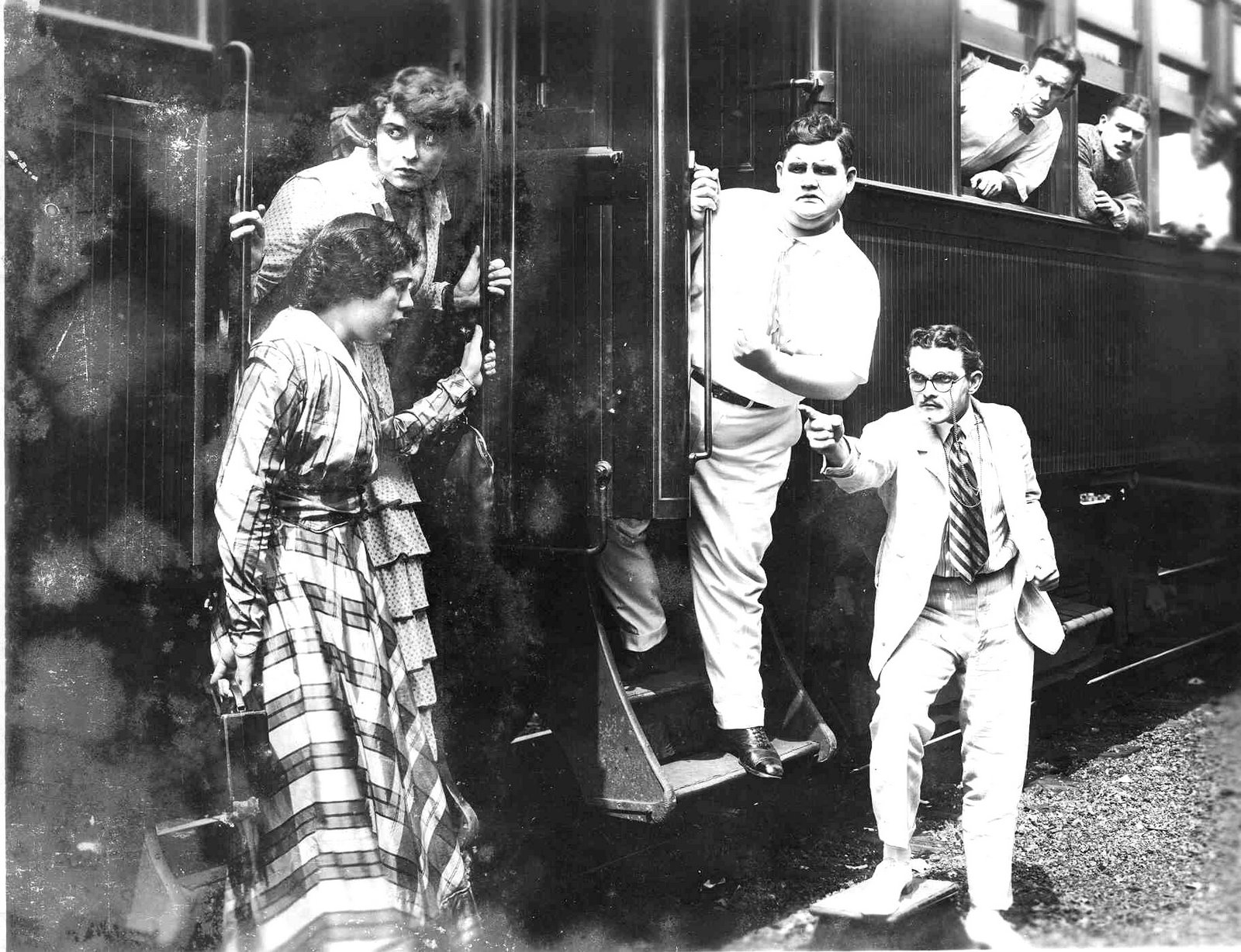
Still from The New Adventures of J. Rufus Wallingford (1915)

- The Crooked Dagger (1919)
- The Red Peril (1919)
- A Romance of the Air (1918)
- April Fool (1918)
- The Eagle's Eye (1918)
- Mission of the War Chest (1918)
- The Candidate (1918)
- The Missionary (1918)
- Below Zero (1917)
- The Great White Trail (1917)
- The Black Stork (1917)
- Patria (1917)
- The Crusher (1917)
- Beatrice Fairfax (1916)
- The Lottery Man (1916)
- The Mysteries of Myra (1916)
- Hazel Kirke (1916)
- The City (1916)
- The New Adventures of J. Rufus Wallingford (1915)
- The Romance of Elaine (1915)
- The New Exploits of Elaine (1915)
- The Stolen Birthright (1914)
- The Exploits of Elaine (1914)
- The Fireman and the Girl (1914)
- A Prince of India (1914)
- The Pawn of Fortune (1914)
- The Warning (1914)
- The Boundary Rider (1914)
