= Abraham Lincoln's Clemency =

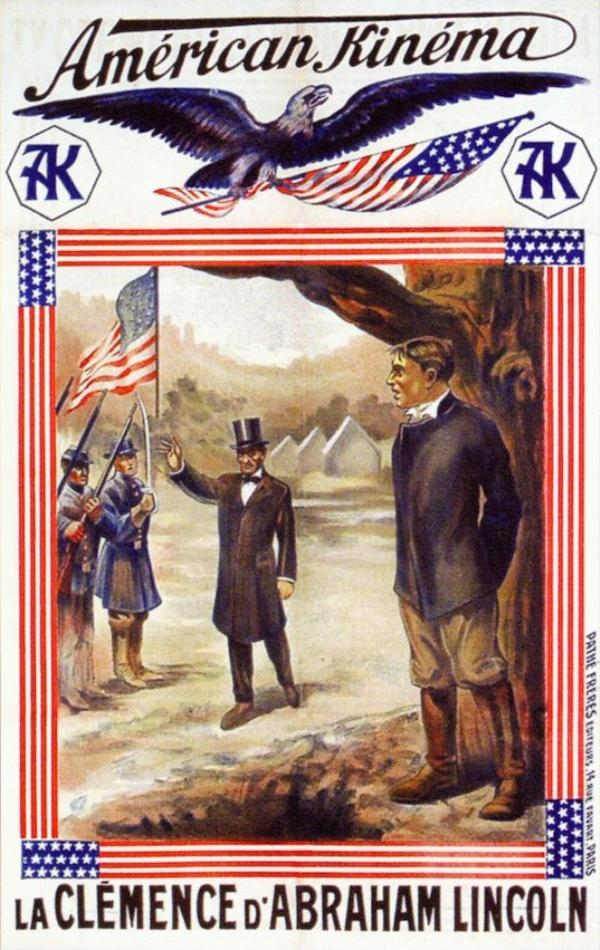
- Theatrical poster
- Directed by: Theodore Wharton
- Distributed by: Pathé
- Release date: November 5, 1910
- Running time: 1 reel
- Country: United States
- Language: Silent (English intertitles)

Abraham Lincoln's Clemency is a 1910 American silent short drama film directed by Theodore Wharton and produced by Pathé Films. The plot revolves around U.S. President Abraham Lincoln pardoning a hapless sentry who fell asleep while on duty during the height of the American Civil War. Due to the soldier's incompetence, he is due to face the firing squad. However, his mother pleads with the President to save her son, which, as the title suggests, he does. The film was a single reel in length. A print of Abraham Lincoln's Clemency exists.

== See also ==
- List of American films of 1910
