= Patria (serial) =

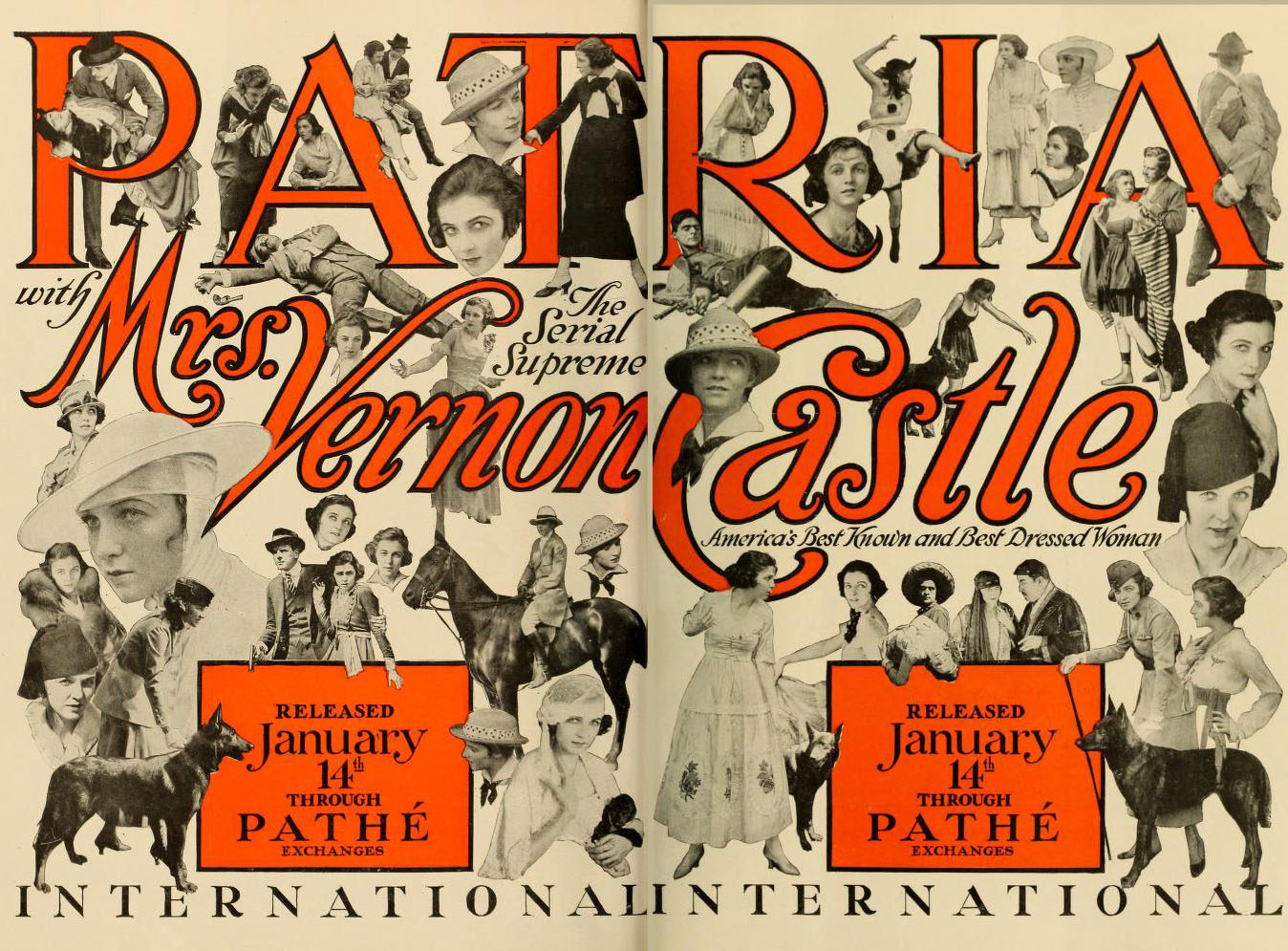
- Advertisement (1917)
- Directed by: Leopold Wharton (chapters 1-10); Theodore Wharton (chapters 1-10); Jacques Jaccard (chapters 11-15)
- Written by: J.B. Clymer; Charles W. Goddard; Louis Joseph Vance
- Produced by: Leopold Wharton; Theodore Wharton; William Randolph Hearst
- Starring: Irene Castle; Milton Sills; Warner Oland
- Cinematography: Levi Bacon; John K. Holbrook; Ray June; Lew Tree
- Production company: International Film Service
- Distributed by: Pathé Exchange
- Release date: January 14, 1917
- Running time: 310 minutes
- Country: United States
- Language: English
- Budget: $90,000 approx.

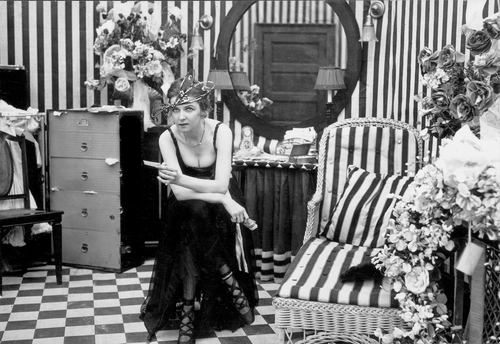
Irene Castle in Patria

Patria (pronounced PAY-tree-uh, as in patriot) is a 1917 15-chapter American serial film starring Irene Castle, Milton Sills, and Warner Oland, based on the novel The Last of the Fighting Channings by Louis Joseph Vance. Patria was an independent film serial funded by William Randolph Hearst in the lead-up to the United States' entry into World War I. The film in its original form contained anti-Japanese propaganda and was investigated by a Senate committee. The Argentine title for the film was La Heroina de Nueva York. At least several fragments of the film survive.

== Plot ==
Spies from Japan conspire to steal the Channing "preparedness" fortune and invade the United States, beginning in New York, then allying themselves with Mexicans across the border. They are stopped by the efforts of munitions factory heiress Patria Channing and U.S. Secret Service agent Donald Parr.

== Cast ==
- Irene Castle as Patria Channing, the heroine of the serial (billed as "Mrs Vernon Castle"), and a lookalike dancer in Episode 4 named Elaine
- Milton Sills as Captain Donald Parr
- Warner Oland as Baron Huroki, the villain
- Dorothy Green as Fanny Adair
- George Majeroni as Senor Juan de Lima
- Wallace Beery as Pancho Villa
- M.W. Rale as Kato
- Allan Murnane as Rodney Wrenn
- F.W. Stewart as Edouard

== Production ==
Patria was financed with "about" $90,000 from William Randolph Hearst. The plot implied that the United States might soon be at war with Japan, despite Japan being an ally of the United States at the time. The original plot involved a Japanese spy ring operating in the United States and seeking gold and munitions. President Woodrow Wilson asked Hearst to modify the serial and remove anti-Japanese material. As a result, Warner Oland's character name in title cards was changed to "Manuel Morales," and the character was shown more frequently dressed in a suit, though the Japanese characters retained their kimono in early episodes. The action was also moved across the border to Mexico beginning in Episode 11, though as is sometimes erroneously stated, Pancho Villa did not appear in the film, Baron Huroki and a new character, General Nogi, continued on as adversaries to Patria and Captain Parr until Huroki's defeat and suicide in Episode 15.

The serial was based on the novel The Last of the Fighting Channings by Louis Joseph Vance. Jacques Jaccard directed scenes in California while Leopold Wharton and Theodore Wharton directed from Ithaca, New York. Working at the Universal Ranch, several battle scenes for the final episodes were enacted on February 11, 1917. Motion Picture News described the preparations, "Five captive balloons, two dirigibles, and a Curtis aeroplane, together with about fifteen hundred men and several hundred horses were used."

Following the serial's release, Edgar Wallace was commissioned to write a 15-part "novel" for The News of the World newspaper, which published the first weekly installment on December 9, 1917.

== Senate hearing ==
The production was investigated by a Senate committee as German propaganda after World War I. A German propagandist, whose articles had appeared in Hearst newspapers, had written a letter to Franz von Papen explaining the scheme to use a motion picture to deprecate Japan. Captain G. C. Lester of US Military Intelligence, testified that "Patria exploited the very idea which was set forth generally in (the propagandist) Fox's statement."

Literary critic Edward Wagenknecht commented:

The year 1916 produced the most vicious of all serials, Hearst’s Patria, written by Louis Joseph Vance and starring Irene Castle, which whipped up war fever, glorified the munitions makers, and so openly attacked Japan that President Wilson personally requested that it be withdrawn.

== See also ==
- Zimmermann Telegram, a German plot for the Mexican invasion of the United States
- List of film serials
- List of film serials by studio
