= The Great White Trail =

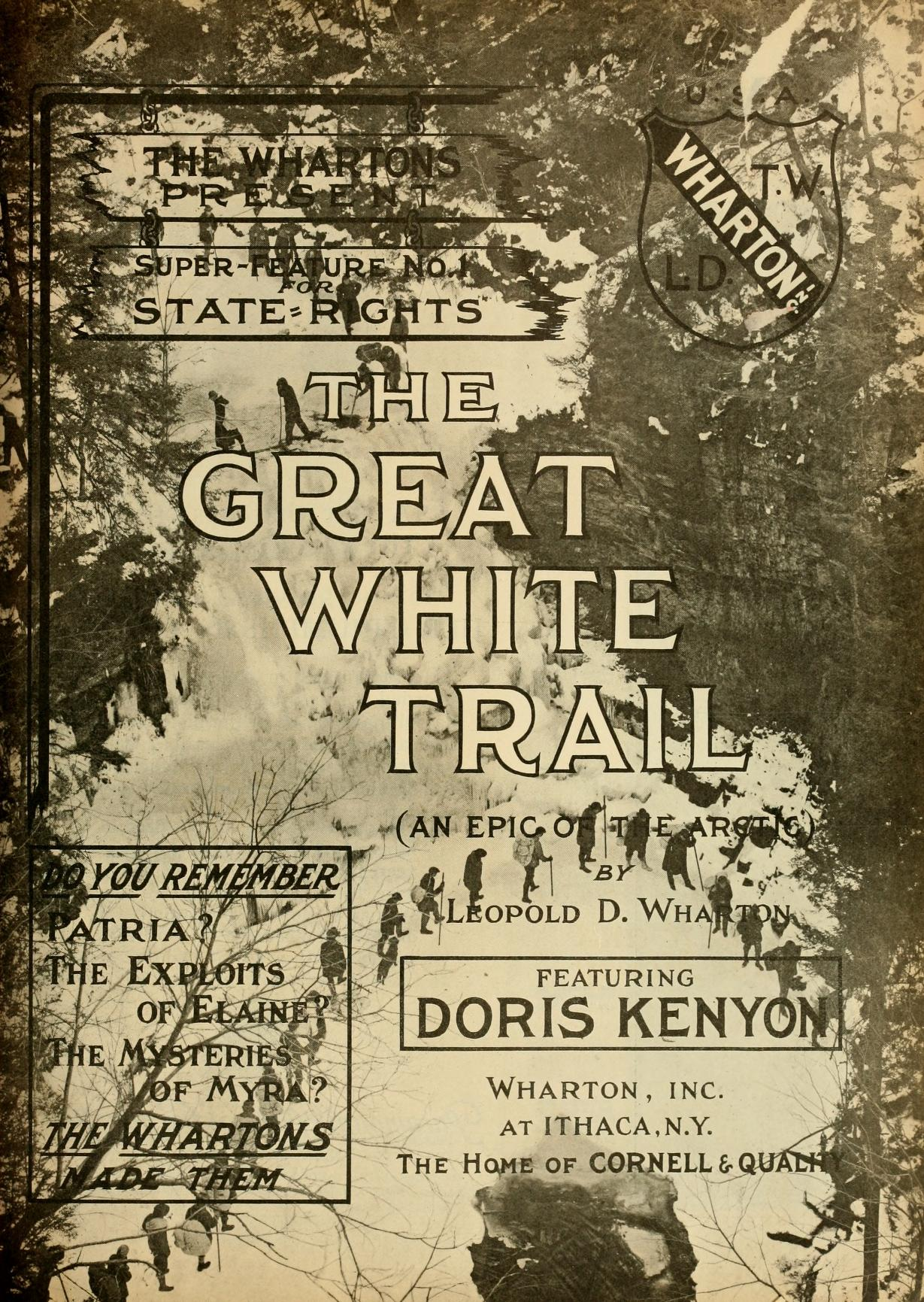
- Advertisement
- Directed by: Leopold Wharton
- Written by: Gardner Hunting; Leopold Wharton
- Produced by: Leopold Wharton; Theodore Wharton
- Cinematography: Ray June; Levi Bacon
- Distributed by: State's Rights Distribution
- Release date: June 1917
- Running time: 8 reels
- Country: United States
- Language: Silent (English intertitles)

The Great White Trail is a surviving 1917 American silent drama film produced and directed by Leopold Wharton and starring Doris Kenyon.

== Cast ==
- Doris Kenyon as Prudence Carrington
- Paul Gordon as George Carrington
- Thomas Holding as Reverend Arthur Dean
- Hans Roberts as Charles Ware
- Louise Hotaling as Marie
- F. W. Stewart as The Vulture (credited as Richard Stewart)
- Edgar L. Davenport as Donald Ware (credited as Edgar Davenport)
- Dick Bennard as Grocer boy
- Bessie Wharton as Marie's Guardian
