= The Eternal City (1915 film) =

1915 film

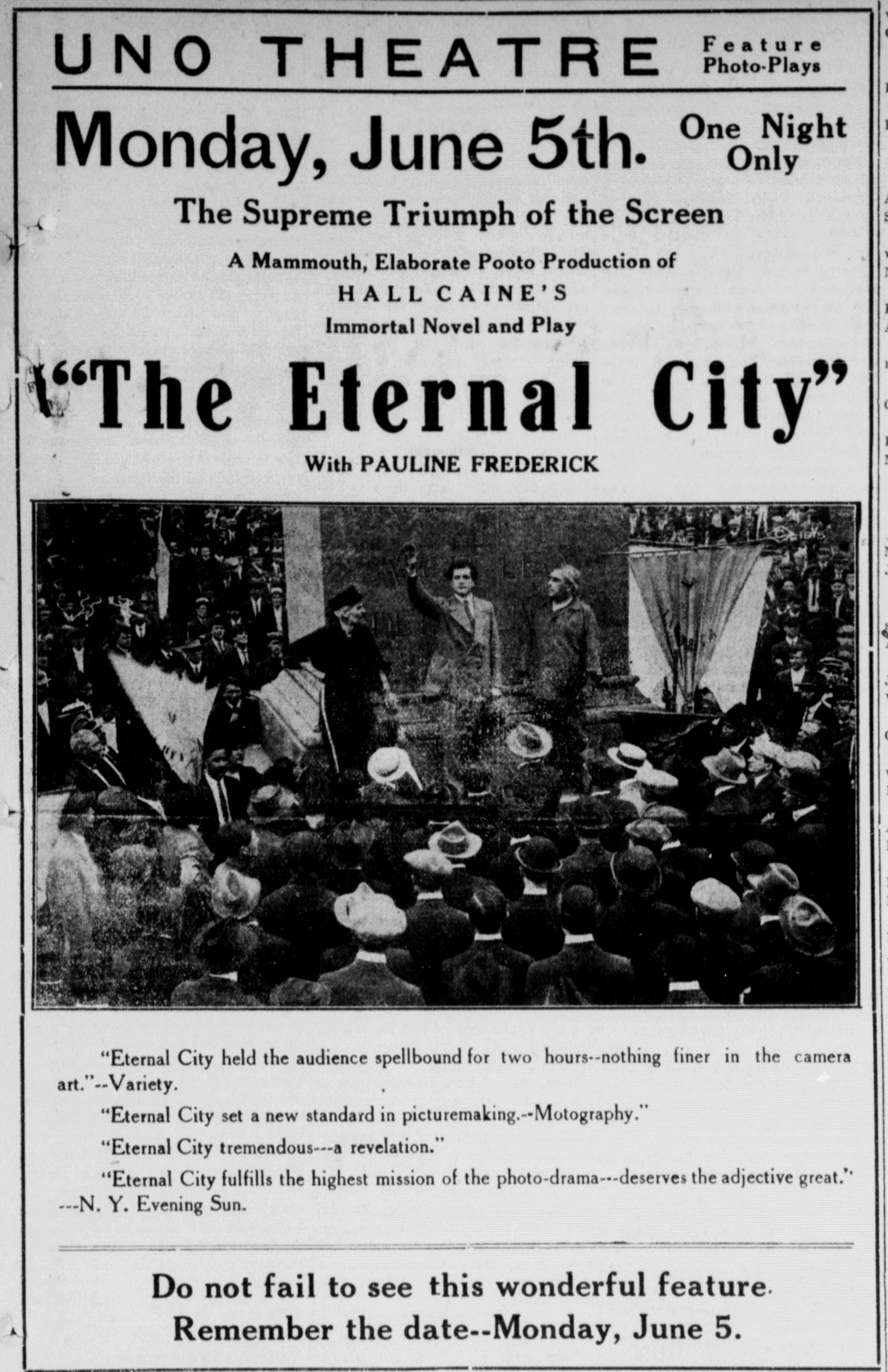
- Newspaper advertisement
- Directed by: Edwin S. Porter; Hugh Ford
- Based on: The Eternal City by Hall Caine (1901 novel and 1902 play)
- Starring: Pauline Frederick
- Production company: Famous Players Film Company
- Distributed by: Select Film Booking Agency
- Release dates: April 12, 1915; December 15, 1918 (US re-release)
- Running time: 8,500 feet 120 mins.
- Country: United States
- Languages: Silent; English intertitles

The Eternal City is a 1915 American silent drama film directed by Hugh Ford and Edwin S. Porter, produced by Adolph Zukor. The movie stars Pauline Frederick in her debut film role, The production is based upon the 1901 novel and 1902 Broadway play of the same name by Hall Caine that starred Viola Allen and Frederic De Belleville. Much of The Eternal City was shot on location in England and Italy before being interrupted by the start of the Great War. The film was released through the specially created Select Film Booking Agency for the Famous Players Film Company.

It was remade in 1923, directed by George Fitzmaurice and starring Barbara La Marr, Bert Lytell, and Lionel Barrymore.

== Plot ==
The wife of Leone, a member of the Papal Guard, believing herself to have been deserted, leaves her young son David with the Sisters of Charity and commits suicide. Little David is brought up by the sisters, and turned over to a Padrone, who takes him to London and mistreats him.

David is befriended by Dr. Roselli, a political exile, and becomes the playmate of Roma, the doctor's daughter. He assumes the name of Rosa. Years later Roma becomes Baron Bonelli's ward, and is supposed to have become his mistress. David is a socialist agitator, and is particularly passionate in denouncing the baron, who is also the prime minister of Italy. The baron arranges to have David killed, but Roma saves him.

Later Roma is induced to betray him through lying promises of clemency for her husband. David thinks Roma has betrayed him intentionally. He kills the baron, and Roma assumes the blame for the crime. David befriended by the pope, discovers he is his father, and through the pope's influence Roma is freed and reunited to her husband.

== Cast ==
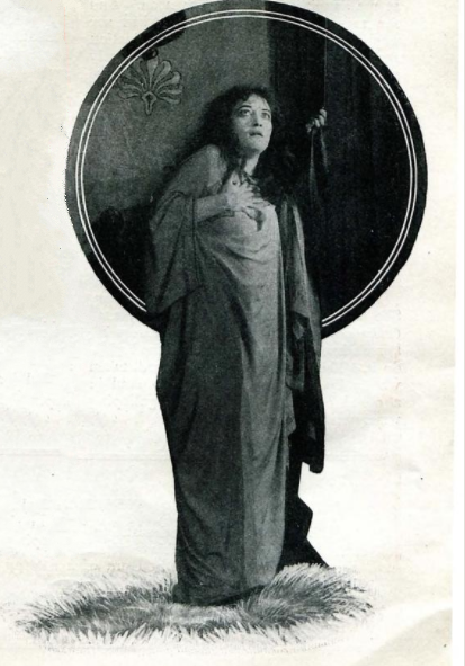
Pauline Frederick as Donna Roma in The Eternal City (1915)

- Pauline Frederick as Donna Roma
- Thomas Holding as David Rossi
- Kittens Reichert as Little Roma
- Arthur Oppenheim as Little David
- George Stillwell as Leone
- Della Bella as Leone's Wife
- Frank Losee as Baron Bonelli
- Fuller Mellish as Pope Pius XI
- J. Jiquel Lanoe as Charles Minghelli
- George Majeroni as Dr. Roselli
- John Clulow as Bruno Rocco
- Amelia Rose as Elena Rocco
- Freddie Verdi as Joseph Rocco
- Lottie Alter as Princess Bellini
- Lawrence Grant ad English Ambassador
- Macy Harlan as Member of The Embassy
- Walter Craven as Member of The Embassy
- F.Gaillard as The Baker
- Mary Lander as The Baker's Wife
- Robert Vivian as Father Pifferi
- Herbert Huben as Padrone
- William Lloyd as Felice
- J. Albert Hall as Prosecuting Attorney

== Production ==
The film was shot on location in London and at the Roman Forum, the Colosseum, and the Vatican gardens in Rome, Italy. Production was interrupted by World War I, and the remainder of the film was shot in New York City.

The $100,000 budget was the most costly Famous Players had attempted. According to Adolf Zukor, Edwin S. Porter reached a new high with his camera work. One long scene showed Thomas Holding as David Rossi, pleading with Fuller Mellish as the pope during a walk in the Vatican gardens. Unfortunately Holding clutched Mellish’s arm. After the company returned they learned that no one was allowed to touch the pope in such a manner. It was possible that Catholics might take offence. Hall Caine had been an adversary of the Catholic Church which complicated the matter further. The film was in trouble. A ban by the Catholic church risked putting Famous Players out of business. As much as possible of the offending scene was cut but some had to stay. There only other option was to postpone the release and send the company back to Rome. By this time, extensive distribution plans had been made. Zukor called on Bishop, later Cardinal Hayes and explained their innocent mistake. Hayes was sympathetic, and the film was released. Afterwards Zukor and Hayes became good friends, often discussing the moral and religious implications of the film.

== Release ==
The Eternal City had its first showing at the Lyceum Theatre on 27 December 1914 and was given a run at the Lyceum. The film was not released on the Paramount Film Corporation program as was usual. Famous Players created the Select Booking Agency to distribute initially The Eternal City and other prestigious feature-length films before being turned over to Paramount.

Hall Caine cabled the producers after attending the British premiere at Marble Arch Pavilion to congratulate them. “It follows my story with an exactness that is remarkable. The pictures of The Eternal City convey just the idea and infuse just the atmosphere that I strove to impart to the book. I am delighted with the film and I only hope that those who see it in the picture theatre will derive as much pleasure as I myself did”. The film was re-released in 1918 as part of the Paramount "Success Series".

The Canadian Board of Censors barred the film from the province of Quebec on the grounds that the story of David Leone, the foundling son of Pope Pius XI, would prove offensive to the majority Roman Catholics.

== Reception ==
By the time The Eternal City opened at the Astor Theatre in New York on 12 April 1915, it was proclaimed to be one of the foremost features produced in the United States.

Kinematograph Weekly said in part: “We congratulate the Famous Players Film Company upon the complete and signal success of their effort in every way, for the production stands out as one of the best that has been submitted for public approval. It is a real classic in picture production, and words are inadequate to thoroughly express our full and emphatic admiration of the subject, which we are convinced will meet with as hearty a reception from the public as any previous subject has yet employed.” The Bioscope wrote "Thanks to its makers The Eternal City is a production planned and executed on a grand scale. In Mr. Caine’s novel the producers had a story giving the utmost scope for spectacular display and scenic ornamentation. They determined to make the very best of their material."

== Preservation ==
The Eternal City is currently presumed lost. In February of 2021, the film was cited by the National Film Preservation Board on their Lost U.S. Silent Feature Films list.

== See also ==
- List of lost films
- Edwin S. Porter filmography
