= Creighton Hale =

American actor (1882–1965)

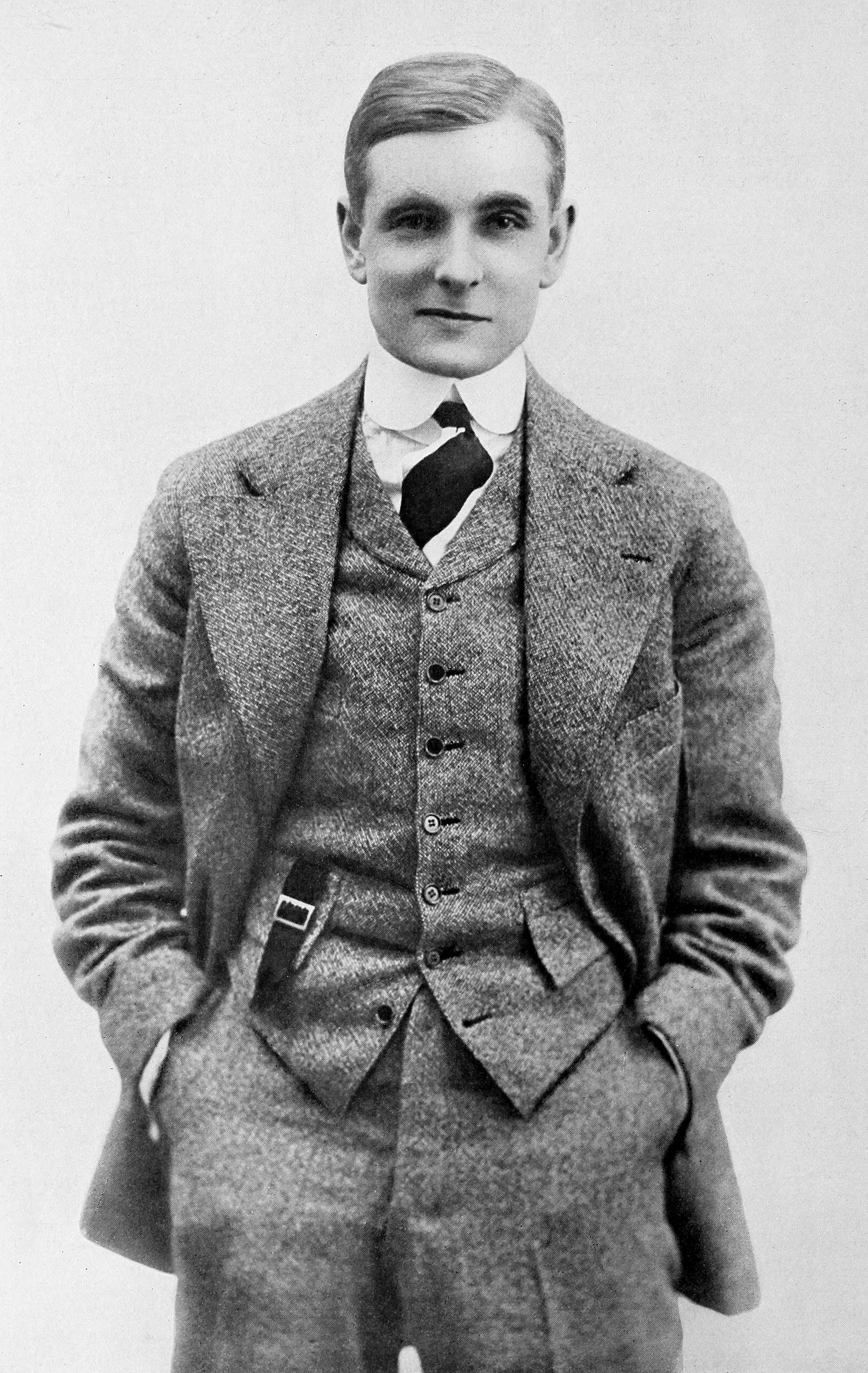
- Hale in 1916
- Born: Patrick Wills Fitzgerald; May 24, 1882; County Cork, Ireland
- Died: August 9, 1965 (aged 83); South Pasadena, California, U.S.
- Other name: Pat Creighton Hale
- Occupation: Actor
- Years active: 1914–1959
- Spouses: Victoire Lowe (m. 1912; div. 1926) Kathleen Bering (m. 1931)
- Children: 2

Creighton Hale (born Patrick Wills Fitzgerald; May 24, 1882 – August 9, 1965) was an Irish-American theatre, film, and television actor whose career extended more than a half-century, from the early 1900s to the end of the 1950s.

== Career ==
Hale was born in County Cork, Ireland, one of two children of Maud V. Hale and Daniel Fitzgerald. Educated in Dublin and London, he later attended Ardingly College in Sussex.

He emigrated to the United States in 1910, with a company headed by Gertrude Elliott. Remaining in the country, he acted in stock theater in Hartford, Indianapolis, and other cities, billed initially as Pat Creighton Hale. While starring in Charles Frohman's Broadway production of Indian Summer, Hale was spotted by a representative of the Pathe Film Company. He eventually became known simply as Creighton Hale, although the derivation of "Creighton" remains unknown. Making his screen debut in The Exploits of Elaine (1914), Hale had prominent supporting roles in films like D.W. Griffith's Way Down East, Orphans of the Storm, and The Idol Dancer, and later starred in such films as The Marriage Circle, Seven Footprints to Satan and The Cat and the Canary. Regarding the latter, Picture Show wrote of Hale's performance, "He makes no attempt to be impressive. He is just natural."

It was thought that in 1923 Hale starred in an early pornographic "stag" film On the Beach (a.k.a. Getting His Goat and The Goat Man). In the film, three nude women agree to have sex with him, but only through a hole in a fence. Photographs of the scene clearly show that the man in the film is not Hale, but is another actor who also wore glasses.

When talkies came about, Hale's career declined. He made several appearances in Hal Roach's Our Gang series (School's Out, Big Ears, Free Wheeling), and also played uncredited bits in major talking films such as Larceny, Inc., The Maltese Falcon, and Casablanca.

== Personal life ==
Hale's two sons, Creighton Hale Jr. and Robert Lowe Hale, from his first marriage to Victoire Lowe, were adopted by Lowe's second husband, actor John Miljan. After his divorce, Hale married Kathleen Bering in Los Angeles in 1931.

Hale's sister-in-law, Isabelle Lowe, was both an accomplished stage actress and a published author and aspiring playwright. She and Hale performed together at least twice during the early 1920s—co-starring in revivals of Rida Johnson Young's Little Old New York and A.E. Thomas's Just Suppose—and co-authored two never-produced plays.

Hale died at the Motion Picture Country Home on August 9, 1965, at age 83. In accordance with his wishes, no funeral service was held, his remains were cremated at Chapel of the Pines, and his ashes were brought to rest at Duncans Mills Cemetery in Northern California.

== Selected filmography ==
- The Million Dollar Mystery (1914) – Gang Member (film debut)
- The Stain (1914) – Office Clerk
- The Taint (1914) – Walter, Madame Bartlett's Son
- The Three of Us (1914) – Clem
- The Exploits of Elaine (1914, Serial) – Walter Jameson (Ep. 1, 2, 3, 6)
- A Fool There Was (1915) – Minor Role
- The New Exploits of Elaine (1915) – Walter Jameson
- The Romance of Elaine (1915, Serial) – Reuben Whitcomb
- Hazel Kirke (1916) – Pittacus Greene
- The Iron Claw (1916, Serial) – Davey
- Charity (1916) – Jimmie Fleming (Mary's brother)
- Snow White (1916) – Prince Florimond
- The Seven Pearls (1917) – Harry Drake
- Mrs. Slacker (1918) – Robert Gibbs
- For Sale (1918) – Waverly Hamilton
- Annexing Bill (1918) – Billy
- Waifs (1918) – Fitzjames Powers
- His Bonded Wife (1918) – Philip Hazard
- The Woman the Germans Shot (1918) – Frank Brooks
- The Great Victory (1919) – Conrad Le Brett
- Oh, Boy! (1919) – George Budd
- The Thirteenth Chair (1919) – Willy Grosby
- The Love Cheat (1919) – Henry Calvin
- A Damsel in Distress (1919) – George Bevan
- The Black Circle (1919) – Andrew MacTavish Ferguson
- The Idol Dancer (1920) – Walter Kincaid
- A Child for Sale (1920) – Charles Stoddard
- Way Down East (1920) – Professor Sterling
- Forbidden Love (1921) – Harold Van Zandt
- Orphans of the Storm (1921) – Picard
- Fascination (1922) – Carlos de Lisa (her brother)
- Her Majesty (1922) – Ted Harper
- Mary of the Movies (1923) – The Boy
- Three Wise Fools (1923) – Young Trumbull
- Trilby (1923) – Little Billee
- Broken Hearts of Broadway (1923) – An Outcast
- Tea: With a Kick! (1923) – Art Binger
- The Marriage Circle (1924) – Dr. Gustav Mueller
- Name the Man (1924) – Alick Gell
- How to Educate a Wife (1924) – Billy Breese
- Riders Up (1924) – Johnny, a.k.a. Information Kid
- Wine of Youth (1924) – Richard (1897 prologue)
- The Mine with the Iron Door (1924) – St. Jimmy
- This Woman (1924) – Bobby Bleedon
- The Bridge of Sighs (1925) – Billy Craig
- Seven Days (1925) – Jim Wilson
- The Circle (1925) – Arnold Cheney
- Exchange of Wives (1925) – Victor Moran
- Time, the Comedian (1925) – Tom Cautley
- The Shadow on the Wall (1925) – George Walters
- Wages for Wives (1925) – Danny Kester
- Beverly of Graustark (1926) – Prince Oscar
- A Poor Girl's Romance (1926) – Wellington Kingston
- The Midnight Message (1926) – Billy Dodd
- Oh, Baby! (1926) – Arthur Graham
- Speeding Through (1926)
- Should Men Walk Home? (1927, Short) – The Gentleman Crook
- Why Girls Say No (1927, Short) – Becky's Boyfriend
- One Hour Married (1927, Short)
- Annie Laurie (1927) – Donald
- Thumbs Down (1927) – Richard Hale
- The Cat and the Canary (1927) – Paul Jones
- Rose-Marie (1928) – Etienne Doray
- Riley of the Rainbow Division (1928) – Riley
- Sisters of Eve (1928) – Leonard Tavernake
- The House of Shame (1928) – Harvey Baremore
- Seven Footprints to Satan (1929) – James Kirkham
- The Great Divide (1929) – Edgar Blossom
- Holiday (1930) – Pete Hedges
- School's Out (1930, Short) – Jack Crabtree – Miss Crabtree's Brother
- Big Ears (1931, Short) – Wheezer's father
- Grief Street (1931) – Ted
- Prestige (1931) – Lieutenant at Engagement Party (uncredited)
- The Greeks Had a Word for Them (1932) – Wedding Supervisor (uncredited)
- Shop Angel (1932) – Maxie Morton
- Free Wheeling (1932, Short) – Dickie's Father
- Sensation Hunters (1933) – Fred Barrett
- The Masquerader (1933) – Bobby Blessington (uncredited)
- Only Yesterday (1933) – (uncredited)
- What's Your Racket? (1934) – Chief
- Gambling Lady (1934) – Funeral Attendee (uncredited)
- George White's Scandals (1934) – Theatre Treasurer (uncredited)
- The Thin Man (1934) – Reporter (uncredited)
- Bulldog Drummond Strikes Back (1934) – Wedding Guest (uncredited)
- The President Vanishes (1934) – Wardell's Secretary (uncredited)
- Helldorado (1935) – Newspaper Reporter (uncredited)
- Mystery Woman (1935) – Radio Operator (uncredited)
- One More Spring (1935) – Minor Role (uncredited)
- Life Begins at 40 (1935) – Drug Clerk (uncredited)
- Million Dollar Haul (1935) – Arthur 'Curley' Roberts
- Becky Sharp (1935) – British Officer (uncredited)
- Men Without Names (1935) – Groom
- Death from a Distance (1935) – Witness (uncredited)
- Your Uncle Dudley (1935) – Auto Salesman (uncredited)
- Custer's Last Stand (1936, Serial) – Hank
- The Music Goes 'Round (1936) – Man on the Street (uncredited)
- The Millionaire Kid (1936) – Thomas Neville
- Till We Meet Again (1936) – English Artillery Officer (uncredited)
- The Country Beyond (1936) – Mountie (uncredited)
- The Crime of Dr. Forbes (1936) – Student Doctor (uncredited)
- 36 Hours to Kill (1936) – Ticket Agent (uncredited)
- Hollywood Boulevard (1936) – Himself – Actor at Trocadero Bar
- Under Your Spell (1936) – Bailiff (uncredited)
- Find the Witness (1937) – Bell Captain
- Step Lively, Jeeves! (1937) – Reporter (uncredited)
- Midnight Taxi (1937) – G-Man (uncredited)
- Charlie Chan on Broadway (1937) – Reporter (uncredited)
- Big Town Girl (1937) – Desk Man (uncredited)
- International Settlement (1938) – Clerk (uncredited)
- One Wild Night (1938) – Bank Teller (uncredited)
- Meet the Girls (1938) – Assistant Bartender (uncredited)
- Confessions of a Nazi Spy (1939) – Draftsman (uncredited)
- Nancy Drew... Trouble Shooter (1939) – Man in Sheriff's Office (uncredited)
- Indianapolis Speedway (1939) – Racetrack Official (uncredited)
- The Cowboy Quarterback (1939) – Broadcaster (uncredited)
- Torchy Blane... Playing with Dynamite (1939) – Hotel Desk Clerk
- Everybody's Hobby (1939) – Hatfield's Reporter (uncredited)
- Nancy Drew and the Hidden Staircase (1939) – Reporter
- Dust Be My Destiny (1939) – Nick's Second Customer (uncredited)
- On Your Toes (1939) – First Stage Manager (uncredited)
- Pride of the Blue Grass (1939) – English Announcer (uncredited)
- On Dress Parade (1939) – Doctor Telling Cadets 'No Visitors' (uncredited)
- The Roaring Twenties (1939) – Customer (uncredited)
- Kid Nightingale (1939) – Man Answering Telephone at Lessernan's Gymnasium (uncredited)
- The Return of Doctor X (1939) – Hotel Manager
- A Child Is Born (1939) – Elevator Operator (uncredited)
- Calling Philo Vance (1940) – Du Bois – Fingerprint Man
- Granny Get Your Gun (1940) – Second Reporter (uncredited)
- One Million B.C. (1940) – Shell Person
- King of the Lumberjacks (1940) – Cashier (uncredited)
- Tear Gas Squad (1940) – Police Announcer (uncredited)
- Saturday's Children (1940) – Stamp Collecting Mailman (uncredited)
- Flight Angels (1940) – San Francisco Airport Attendant (uncredited)
- Brother Orchid (1940) – Reporter #3 (uncredited)
- A Fugitive from Justice (1940) – Reporter at Train Station (uncredited)
- Gambling on the High Seas (1940) – Nelson – Gambling Loser (uncredited)
- The Man Who Talked Too Much (1940) – Reporter #4 (uncredited)
- All This, and Heaven Too (1940) – Ship's Officer (uncredited)
- My Love Came Back (1940) – Thompson – Music Co. Clerk (uncredited)
- Money and the Woman (1940) – Mack, Bank Customer (uncredited)
- Knute Rockne All American (1940) – Callahan's Secretary (uncredited)
- Tugboat Annie Sails Again (1940) – James – Armstrong's Chauffeur (uncredited)
- East of the River (1940) – Casino Floor Man (uncredited)
- Always a Bride (1940) – First Reporter (uncredited)
- Father Is a Prince (1940) – Lawrence – Bower's Accountant (uncredited)
- Lady with Red Hair (1940) – Reporter Eddie (uncredited)
- She Couldn't Say No (1940) – Jasper – Loafer on Hotel Porch (uncredited)
- Santa Fe Trail (1940) – Telegraph Operator (uncredited)
- Honeymoon for Three (1941) – Ticket Agent (uncredited)
- The Strawberry Blonde (1941) – Secretary (uncredited)
- The Great Mr. Nobody (1941) – Man Buying Newspaper (uncredited)
- Footsteps in the Dark (1941) – Mr. Harlan (uncredited)
- Here Comes Happiness (1941) – Headline Printer (uncredited)
- Knockout (1941) – Second Reporter (uncredited)
- Affectionately Yours (1941) – Hotel Manager with Key (uncredited)
- Out of the Fog (1941) – Pharmacist (uncredited)
- Sergeant York (1941) – Associated Press Man (uncredited)
- The Bride Came C.O.D. (1941) – Reporter #5 (uncredited)
- Bullets for O'Hara (1941) – Jury Foreman (uncredited)
- Bad Men of Missouri (1941) – Bank Representative (uncredited)
- Highway West (1941) – Waiter (uncredited)
- Dive Bomber (1941) – Hospital Attendant (uncredited)
- The Smiling Ghost (1941) – Collector (uncredited)
- Nine Lives Are Not Enough (1941) – Mahan – Police Fingerprint Expert (uncredited)
- Passage from Hong Kong (1941) – Steamship Clerk (uncredited)
- One Foot in Heaven (1941) – Church Usher (uncredited)
- The Maltese Falcon (1941) – Stenographer (uncredited)
- Law of the Tropics (1941) – Wilson – Clerk (uncredited)
- Blues in the Night (1941) – Gambler at Dice Table (uncredited)
- The Body Disappears (1941) – Prof. Edwards (uncredited)
- Steel Against the Sky (1941) – Jim (uncredited)
- The Man Who Came to Dinner (1942) – Radio Man (uncredited)
- Bullet Scars (1942) – Jess, the Druggist
- The Male Animal (1942) – Reporter (uncredited)
- Murder in the Big House (1942) Ritter – Warden's Secretary
- Larceny, Inc. (1942) – Mr. Carmichael
- Yankee Doodle Dandy (1942) – Telegraph Operator (uncredited)
- Spy Ship (1942) – Reporter (uncredited)
- The Big Shot (1942) – Bit Role (uncredited)
- Wings for the Eagle (1942) – Jeweler (uncredited)
- Escape from Crime (1942) – Durkin (uncredited)
- The Gay Sisters (1942) – Mourner / Courtroom Sketch Artist (uncredited)
- Busses Roar (1942) – The Ticket Agent (uncredited)
- You Can't Escape Forever (1942) – Newspaper Employee Taking Notes (uncredited)
- The Hidden Hand (1942) – The Coroner (uncredited)
- Gentleman Jim (1942) – Championship Fight Spectator (uncredited)
- Casablanca (1942) – Dubious Gambler (uncredited)
- The Gorilla Man (1943) – Constable Fletcher
- The Mysterious Doctor (1943) – Luke (uncredited)
- Action in the North Atlantic (1943) – Sparks (uncredited)
- Watch on the Rhine (1943) – Chauffeur (uncredited)
- Thank Your Lucky Stars (1943) – Engineer (uncredited)
- The Crime Doctor's Strangest Case (1943) – Dr. Carter (uncredited)
- Uncertain Glory (1944) – Prison Secretary (uncredited)
- The Adventures of Mark Twain (1944) – Man with Mule (uncredited)
- Mr. Skeffington (1944) – Casey (uncredited)
- Crime by Night (1944) – Horace Grayson (uncredited)
- The Last Ride (1944) – Air Raid Warden (uncredited)
- Confidential Agent (1945) – Postman (uncredited)
- Three Strangers (1946) – Man in Pub (uncredited)
- A Stolen Life (1946) – Attendant at Wedding Reception (uncredited)
- Her Kind of Man (1946) – Backstage Man (uncredited)
- Janie Gets Married (1946) – Newspaper Worker (uncredited)
- Night and Day (1946) – Man in Theatre (uncredited)
- Two Guys from Milwaukee (1946) – Mayor's Aide (uncredited)
- The Verdict (1946) – Reporter (uncredited)
- Humoresque (1946) – Professor (uncredited)
- Nora Prentiss (1947) – Captain of Waiters, Sea Gull Cafe (uncredited)
- That Way with Women (1947) – Briggs
- The Two Mrs. Carrolls (1947) – Second Tout (uncredited)
- Stallion Road (1947) – Engagement Party Guest (uncredited)
- Love and Learn (1947) – Tom – the Wyngate Butler (uncredited)
- Possessed (1947) – Secretary at Inquest (uncredited)
- The Perils of Pauline (1947) – Marcelled Leading Man
- Cry Wolf (1947) – Dr. Reynolds (uncredited)
- Life with Father (1947) – Mr. Wickersham – Father of Twin Boys (uncredited)
- Always Together (1947) – Eric, Turner's Butler (uncredited)
- April Showers (1948) – Hotel Guest (uncredited)
- The Woman in White (1948) – Underservant (uncredited)
- The Big Punch (1948) – Dr. LeRoy (uncredited)
- Embraceable You (1948) – Bus Station Ticket Clerk (uncredited)
- Johnny Belinda (1948) – Bailiff (uncredited)
- Smart Girls Don't Talk (1948) – Apartment House Clerk (uncredited)
- June Bride (1948) – Airplane Passenger (uncredited)
- Fighter Squadron (1948) – Cockney (uncredited)
- The Decision of Christopher Blake (1948) – Actor in Dream Play (uncredited)
- Whiplash (1948) – Man Leaving Nightclub (uncredited)
- John Loves Mary (1949) – Waiter (uncredited)
- Flaxy Martin (1949) – George – Tenement Resident (uncredited)
- A Kiss in the Dark (1949) – Tenant (uncredited)
- Homicide (1949) – Glorietta Desk Clerk (uncredited)
- Tulsa (1949) – Party Guest (uncredited)
- The Younger Brothers (1949) – Hotel Clerk (uncredited)
- Night Unto Night (1949) – Auto Court Workman (uncredited)
- The Fountainhead (1949) – Court Clerk (uncredited)
- One Last Fling (1949) – Gus, Bolton's Valet (uncredited)
- The Girl from Jones Beach (1949) – Waiter (uncredited)
- The House Across the Street (1949) – Newspaper Office Worker (uncredited)
- Beyond the Forest (1949) – Townsman with Glasses (uncredited)
- The Story of Seabiscuit (1949) – Oscar – Racetrack Spectator (uncredited)
- Always Leave Them Laughing (1949) – Hotel Clerk (uncredited)
- Montana (1950) – Rancher (uncredited)
- Backfire (1950) – Cab Driver (uncredited)
- Francis (1950) – Bank Employee (uncredited)
- Chain Lightning (1950) – Well-Wisher (uncredited)
- Perfect Strangers (1950) – Reporter (uncredited)
- The Daughter of Rosie O'Grady (1950) – Well-Wisher at Dressing Room Party (uncredited)
- The Flame and the Arrow (1950) – Undetermined role (uncredited)
- The Great Jewel Robber (1950) – Hotel Clerk (uncredited)
- Atom Man vs. Superman (1950, Serial) – Observer [Ch. 1] (uncredited)
- Sunset Boulevard (1950) – Himself (uncredited)
- The Enforcer (1951) – Music Store Clerk (uncredited)
- Goodbye, My Fancy (1951) – Griswolds' Butler (uncredited)
- Fort Worth (1951) – Railroad Backer (uncredited)
- On Moonlight Bay (1951) – Father in Silent Movie (uncredited)
- Painting the Clouds with Sunshine (1951) – Undetermined role (uncredited)
- Come Fill the Cup (1951) – Newspaperman (uncredited)
- Starlift (1951) – Theatre Manager (uncredited)
- The Girl in White (1952) – Instructor (uncredited)
- Scarlet Angel (1952) – Judge Ames (uncredited)
- Washington Story (1952) – Congressman (uncredited)
- Cattle Town (1952) – Townsman on Street (uncredited)
- Because You're Mine (1952) – Eye Examiner (uncredited)
- Million Dollar Mermaid (1952) – Husband on Beach (uncredited)
- Off Limits (1952) – Bar Patron (uncredited)
- So You Want to Learn to Dance (1953, Short) – Barber (uncredited)
- The System (1953) – Reporter at Senate Investigation Hearing (uncredited)
- Sangaree (1953) – Mr. Hale, plantation owner (uncredited)
- So This Is Love (1953) – Passerby (uncredited)
- Take the High Ground! (1953) – Army Doctor (uncredited)
- Walking My Baby Back Home (1953) – Edwards (uncredited)
- Phantom of the Rue Morgue (1954) – Concierge's Husband (uncredited)
- A Star Is Born (1954) – Undetermined role, crowd scene (uncredited)
- Strange Lady in Town (1955) – Card Player (uncredited)
- The McConnell Story (1955) – Fight Fan (uncredited)
- Illegal (1955) – Undetermined role, courtroom scene
- The Steel Jungle (1956) – Clerk
- Serenade (1956) – Assistant Stage Manager (uncredited)
- Our Miss Brooks (1956) – Faculty Member (uncredited)
- The She-Creature (1956) – Minor Role (uncredited)
- Sneak Preview (TV series, 1956) – episode "One Minute from Broadway"
- Top Secret Affair (1957) – Clerk at Senate Hearing (uncredited)
- The Spirit of St. Louis (1957) – Man Driving Car (uncredited)
- The Helen Morgan Story (1957) – Speakeasy Patron (uncredited)
- The Story of Mankind (1957) – Heavenly Judge (uncredited)
- Westbound (1959) – Irritated Stagecoach Passenger (uncredited) (final film role)
