= The Lottery Man (1916 film) =

1916 film

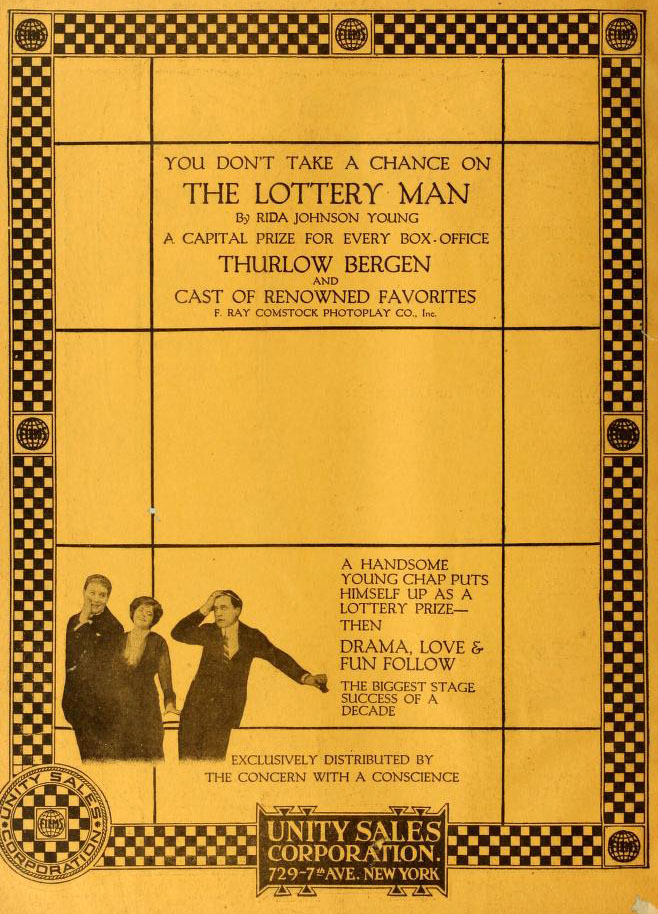
- Directed by: Leopold Wharton; Theodore Wharton
- Written by: Theodore Wharton; Rida Johnson Young
- Produced by: F. Ray Comstock; Leopold Wharton; Theodore Wharton
- Starring: Thurlow Bergen
- Cinematography: Levi Bacon
- Edited by: Bess Spencer
- Distributed by: Whartons Studio
- Release date: June 26, 1916
- Running time: 5 reels
- Country: United States
- Languages: Silent; English intertitles

The Lottery Man is a 1916 American silent comedy film written by Theodore Wharton and Rida Johnson Young. It was directed by Leopold Wharton and Wharton, and stars Oliver Hardy, Thurlow Bergen and Lottie Alter. It was produced at the Whartons Studio in Ithaca, New York, and distributed by Whartons Studio. The film was released on June 26, 1916. A print of the film exists in the film archive of the Library of Congress.

== Cast ==
- Thurlow Bergen as Jack Wright-a son
- Elsie Esmond as Miss Helen Heyer-foxeys cousin
- Carolyn Lee as Lizzie Roberts-Mrs Peytons pet goat
- Allan Murnane as Foxey Peyton-his chum
- Lottie Alter as Mrs. Wright-little mother
- Ethel Winthrop as Mrs. Peyton-foxey's mother
- Mary Leslie Mayo as Hedgwig Jensen-physical instructor
- F.W. Stewart as Mcquire the newspaper publisher and the local constable
- Oliver Hardy as Maggie Murphy
- Edward O'Connor as The Butler
- Malcolm Head as Vegetable cart man in accident
- Louis A. Fuertes as Lottery drawing host
- Clarence Merrick as Chauffeur
- Joseph Urband as Newspaper workroom clerk
- Frances White as Mrs. Peyton's maid

== Plot ==
Jack Wright is a young college man and football hero who after graduating, discovers that his mother has lost the family property, so that he must go to work. He becomes a newspaper reporter and induces the paper to start a lottery with himself as the prize, agreeing to marry the woman who holds the lucky number. Jack then falls in love with his chum, Foxey Peyton's cousin Helen, and repents the lottery plan, but it is too late. Helen, Jack and Foxey all begin buying up papers in the hope that she may get the lucky number and straighten everything out. The drawing is held in front of the City Hall, in the presence of an excited crowd of women. Picture the hero's dismay when a kitchen maid and not his sweetheart, holds the lucky number. True love triumphs when the kitchen maid decides she would rather marry the butler and divide the $100,000 prize money.

Synopsis — (1916) Motion Picture News

== Reception ==
Film critic Harvey F. Thew said the film is a "most compact and well-constructed comedy, and the interest is maintained throughout, without resort to slapstick methods or business. In addition, there is some good character drawing, and an atmosphere of healthy, happy outdoor life has been brought into the story".

Lynde Denig of the Moving Picture World said that it lacked much of the humor of the stage comedy from which it was taken, but it is not without redeeming features in the acting of Thurlow Bergen and the situations developed from a first rate farcical plot. It is hardly a picture for audiences accustomed to the niceties of expert studio workmanship, but for those who are not over particular, and who respond to comedy and sentiment in the elementary forms, there should be entertainment in the production.

== See also ==
- List of American films of 1916
