= Kismet (1920 film) =

1920 silent film directed by Louis J. Gasnier

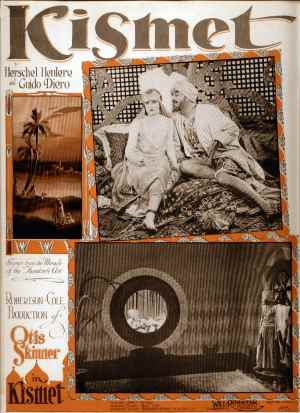
- Sheet music cover with film scenes
- Directed by: Louis J. Gasnier
- Written by: Charles E. Whittaker (scenario)
- Based on: Kismet; 1911 play by Edward Knoblock
- Starring: Otis Skinner
- Cinematography: Tony Gaudio; Glen MacWilliams; Joseph du Bray
- Music by: Carl Edouarde
- Production company: Waldorf Film Corporation
- Distributed by: Robertson-Cole
- Release date: November 14, 1920
- Running time: 5 reels
- Country: United States
- Language: Silent (English intertitles)

full film

Kismet is an American silent film version of the 1911 play Kismet by Edward Knoblock, starring Otis Skinner and Elinor Fair, and directed by Louis J. Gasnier.

Skinner's daughter, author Cornelia Otis Skinner, plays a small role. This version was released by Robertson-Cole Distributing Company, and was released on VHS by Grapevine Video. In New England the distribution of the film was handled by Joseph P. Kennedy who organized a successful premiere in Boston.

Skinner filmed the play again in a 1930 talkie. The 1930 version is considered lost but its Vitaphone soundtrack survives.

== Cast ==
- Otis Skinner as Hajj the Beggar
- Rosemary Theby as Kut-al-Kulub
- Elinor Fair as Marsinah
- Marguerite Comont as Nargis
- Nicholas Dunaew as Nasir
- Herschel Mayall as Jawan
- Fred Lancaster as Zayd
- Leon Bary as Caliph Abdullah
- Sidney Smith as Jester
- Hamilton Revelle as Wazir Mansur
- Tom Kennedy as Kutayt
- Sam Kaufman as Amru
- Emmett King as Wazir Abu Bakr
- Fanny Ferrari as Gulnar
- Emily Seville as Kabirah

== Bibliography ==
- Beauchamp, Cari. Joseph P. Kennedy's Hollywood Years. Faber and Faber, 2009
