= Lottie Alter =

American actress (1871–1924)

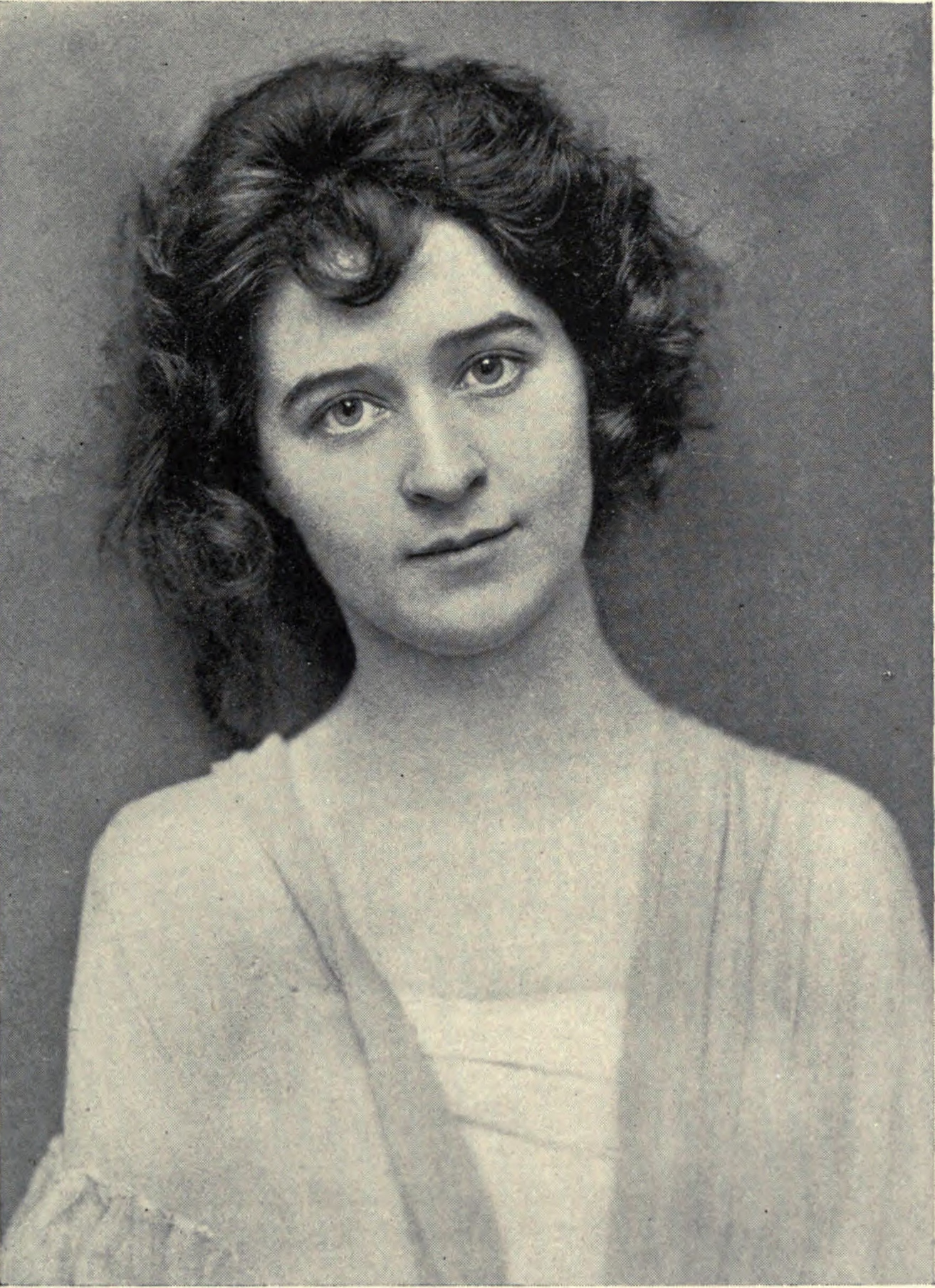
- Alter, from a 1901 publication
- Born: Charlotte Alice Alter; January 16, 1871; La Crosse, Wisconsin, U.S.
- Died: December 25, 1924 (aged 53); Beechhurst, Queens, New York, U.S.
- Resting place: Flushing Cemetery
- Occupation: Actress
- Years active: 1886–1924
- Known for: Stage and silent films
- Spouse: Harry C. Bradley (m. 1923)

Charlotte Alice Alter (January 16, 1871 – December 25, 1924) was an American actress on stage and in silent films.

== Early life ==
Alter was born in La Crosse, Wisconsin on January 16, 1871, the daughter of Frederick Pernal Alter and Ida Alter (née Soplitt).

== Career ==
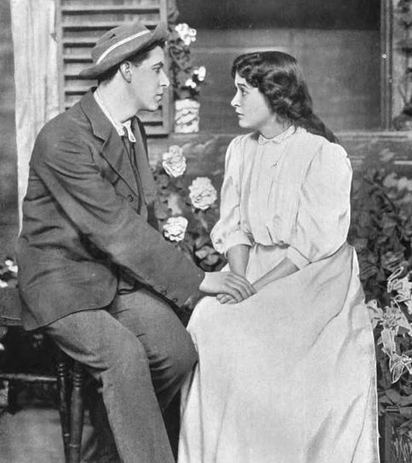
Arthur Vezin and Lottie Alter in Mrs. Wiggs of the Cabbage Patch (1908).

Alter began acting in the American midwest by 1890, playing soubrette roles in touring companies managed by Henrietta Crosman, Joseph Jefferson, and Charles Frohman, in such shows as The Cricket on the Hearth, Beside the Bonnie Brier Bush, The Country Circus, Fifi, The Shadows of a Great City, The Girl I Left Behind Me, and Hearts are Trumps. On Broadway, she acted in To Have and to Hold (1901), The Vinegar Buyer (1903), The Trifler (1905) with Esme Beringer, Charley's Aunt (1906), and Excuse Me (1911) by Rupert Hughes. Of her work in Excuse Me, critic George Jean Nathan wrote that she was among "the best in a generally capable cast."

She toured Australia and Great Britain in Mrs. Wiggs of the Cabbage Patch. In 1916 she was leading her own company in vaudeville.

Silent film appearances by Alter included roles in the film shorts Advertising for a Wife (1910) and An Arizona Romance (1910), and the feature films The Eternal City (1915) alongside Pauline Frederick and Thomas Holding, and The Lottery Man (1916) with Oliver Hardy and Thurlow Bergen.

== Personal life ==
Alter married a fellow actor, Harry C. Bradley, in 1923.

She died in Beechhurst, Queens, New York, in 1924 of pneumonitis. She was buried at Flushing Cemetery.
