= The Eagle's Eye =

1918 film

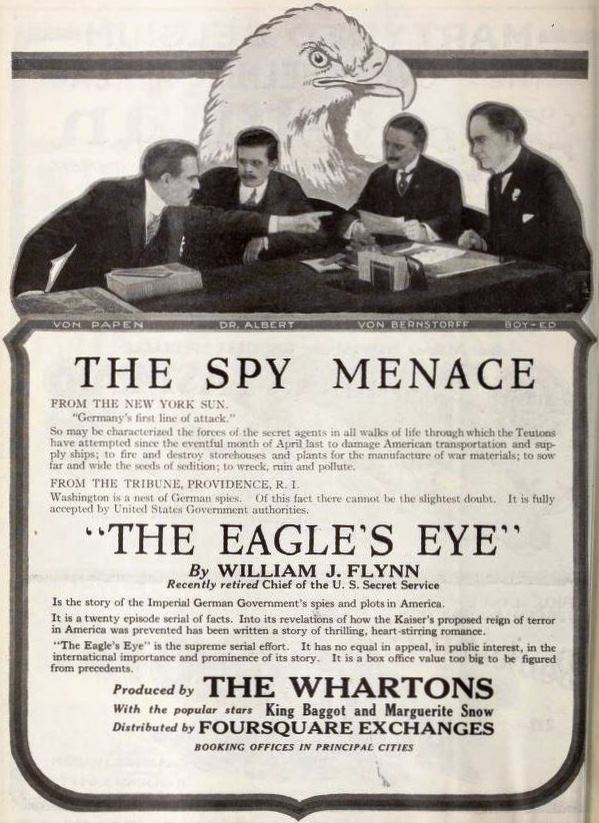
- Advertisement
- Directed by: George Lessey; Wellington A. Playter; Leopold Wharton; Theodore Wharton
- Written by: Courtney Ryley Cooper (scenario)
- Based on: William J. Flynn
- Starring: King Baggot; Marguerite Snow; William Bailey
- Cinematography: Levi Bacon; John K. Holbrook; Ray June
- Production company: The Whartons Studio
- Distributed by: Foursquare Pictures
- Release date: March 27, 1918
- Running time: 20 2 reel episodes
- Country: United States
- Language: Silent (English intertitles)

The Eagle's Eye is a 1918 American serial film consisting of 20 episodes that dramatizes German espionage in the United States during World War I. The stories are based on the experiences of William J. Flynn during his career as chief of the United States Secret Service from 1912 to 1917.

It features King Baggot as the president of the Criminology Club and Marguerite Snow as a Secret Service agent who investigate spies. Among the events depicted are the sending of the Zimmermann Telegram, Franz von Rintelen's attempts to sabotage cargo loading in San Francisco Harbor, and the capture of the German espionage plans. It was directed by George Lessey, Wellington A. Playter, Leopold Wharton, and Theodore Wharton, and produced by the Whartons Studio. The serial is now considered lost. Because this serial was a commercial failure, it was the last one made by Whartons due to the studio being forced to declare bankruptcy.

== Background ==
After Flynn's retirement from the Secret Service his work investigating sabotage during the war were interwoven with fictitious characters and events by Courtney Ryley Cooper into a 20-part spy thriller. These were also published as weekly installments in The Atlanta Constitution's magazine section during 1918 under the title The Eagle's Eye: A True Story of the Imperial German Government's Spies and Intrigues in America. Fifteen of the episodes were republished as chapters in a book the following year.

== Cast ==
- King Baggot as Harrison Grant
- Marguerite Snow as Dixie Mason
- William Bailey as Heinrich von Lertz
- Florence Short as Madame Augusta Stephan
- Bertram Marburgh as Count Johann von Bernstorff
- Paul Everton as Captain Franz von Papen
- John P. Wade as Captain Karl Boy-Ed
- Fred C. Jones as Dr. Heinrich Albert
- Wellington A. Playter as Franz von Rintelen
- Louise Hotaling
- Louis C. Bement as Uncle Sam
- Allan Murnane
- F.W. Stewart
- Robin H. Townley
- Bessie Wharton as Mrs. Blank

== Chapter titles ==
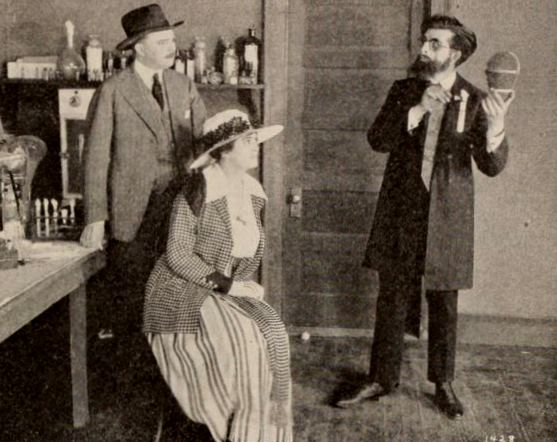
Still from episode 17 of the serial with Fred C. Jones, Marguerite Snow, and William Bailey.

1. Hidden Death
2. The Naval Ball Conspiracy
3. The Plot Against the Fleet
4. Von Rintelen, the Destroyer
5. The Strike Breeders
6. The Plot Against Organized Labor
7. Brown Port Folio
8. The Kaiser's Death Messenger
9. The Munitions Campaign
10. The Invasion of Canada
11. The Burning of Hopewell
12. The Canal Conspirators
13. The Reign of Terror
14. The Infantile Paralysis Epidemic
15. The Campaign Against Cotton
16. The Raid of the U-53
17. Germany's U-Base in America
18. The Great Hindu Conspiracy
19. The Menace of the I.W.W.
20. The Great Decision

== See also ==
- Charles E. Apgar, on whose life experience a minor character in "The Great Hindu Conspiracy" is based
