= Theodore Wharton =

American film director (1875–1931)

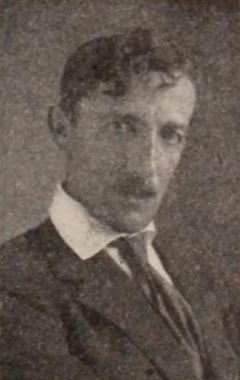
- Born: April 12, 1875; Milwaukee, Wisconsin
- Died: November 28, 1931 (aged 56); Los Angeles, California
- Occupation: Film director
- Years active: 1910–1920
- Relatives: Leopold Wharton (brother)

Theodore Wharton (1875–1931) was an American film director, producer and writer. He directed 48 films in the 1910s and 1920s, including the 1915 The New Adventures of J. Rufus Wallingford featuring Oliver Hardy.

== Biography ==
Wharton was born April 12, 1875, in Milwaukee, Wisconsin. He was the younger brother of Leopold Wharton, who also became a film director.

In 1890, Wharton started in both the business side of the theater as well as acting in Dallas, Texas. He worked for a number of stock companies, including that of Augustin Daly until 1899, and then became a stage manager. In 1907, he visited Edison Studios and worked there until 1909. Over the next 3 years, he wrote and directed many screenplays for various studios including Essanay Studios.

In 1912, the US government commissioned him to produce The Late Indian Wars, the first sevel-reel motion picture in America. It was filmed on location in the Great Plains, with a script by General Charles King and a large cast including other generals and "Buffalo Bill" Cody.

The Whartons Studio opened in Ithaca, New York, in 1914. Stars he directed included Francis X. Bushman, Henry B. Walthall and Beverly Bayne. In the 1920s Wharton moved to Santa Cruz, California, as promoted by mayor Fred Swanton.

Wharton died on November 28, 1931, in Los Angeles.

== Selected filmography ==
- Abraham Lincoln's Clemency (1910)
- From the Submerged (1912)
- The Exploits of Elaine (1914)
- The New Adventures of J. Rufus Wallingford (1915)
- The New Exploits of Elaine (1915)
- The Romance of Elaine (1915)
- The Mysteries of Myra serial (1916)
- The Lottery Man (1916)
- The Black Stork (1917)
- Patria (1917)
- The Great White Trail (1917)
- The Eagle's Eye (1918)
- The Moon Riders (1920)
- The Eagle's Talons (1923)
