= The Perils of Pauline (1914 serial) =

1914 American film serial

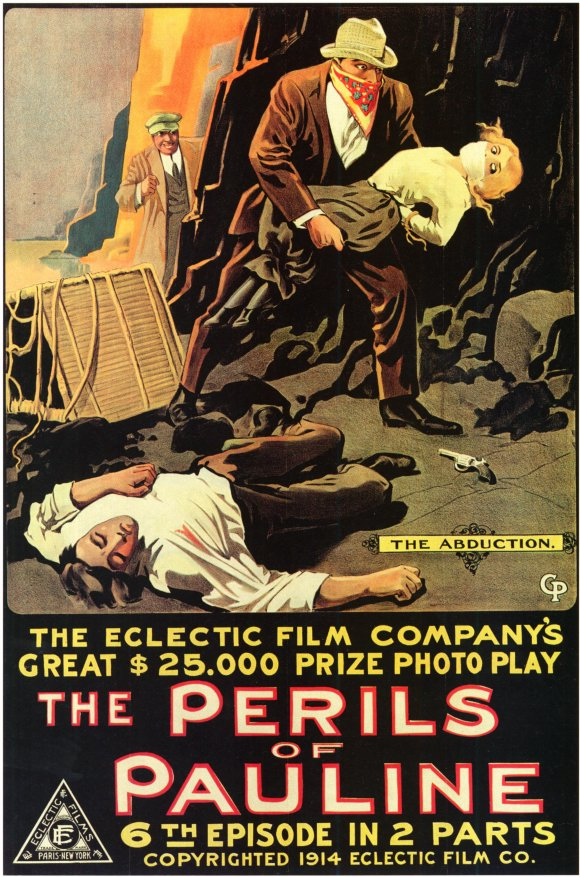
- Theatrical release poster for episode 6
- Directed by: Louis J. Gasnier; Donald MacKenzie
- Written by: Charles W. Goddard; George B. Seitz
- Starring: Pearl White
- Cinematography: Arthur C. Miller
- Distributed by: General Film Company & Eclectic Film Company
- Release date: March 31, 1914
- Running time: 20 chapters (total of 410 minutes)
- Country: United States
- Language: Silent with English intertitles

The Perils of Pauline is a 1914 American melodrama film serial produced by William Randolph Hearst and released by the Eclectic Film Company, an American subsidiary of the French group Pathé Frères, shown in bi-weekly installments, featuring Pearl White as the title character, a young heiress with an independent nature and a desire for adventure.

The serial had 20 episodes, the first being three reels (30 minutes), and the rest two reels (20 minutes) each. After the original run, it was reshown in theaters a number of times, sometimes in re-edited versions, through the 1920s. Today, The Perils of Pauline is known to exist only in a condensed, reformatted 9-chapter version (approximately 214 minutes), released in Europe in 1916 by Pathé Frères.

Despite popular associations, Pauline was never tied to a railroad track in the series, an image that was added to popular mythology by scenes in stage melodramas of the 1800s, in film serials featuring the resourceful "railroad girl" Helen Holmes in her long-running series The Hazards of Helen, and in other railroad-themed Holmes cliffhangers such as The Girl and the Game. The images of Holmes's railroad adventures were blended in the public mind with Pearl White's cliffhanging adventures, probably because White became the bigger celebrity.

In 2008, The Perils of Pauline was selected for preservation in the United States National Film Registry by the Library of Congress, as being "culturally, historically, or aesthetically significant".

== Plot ==
Before Pauline will agree to marry Harry, who proposes marriage to her on the tennis court, she wishes to be allowed to embark upon activities of her choice for a year and then write about them afterward. She then rides in a balloon, flies an airplane, drives a racing car, rides in a horse race, goes on a treasure hunt, acts in a motion picture, and tours a submarine, among other things. She frequently ends up in trouble after being captured or assaulted by henchmen of Raymond Owen, her adoptive father's scheming secretary, who wants to dispose of Pauline and gain her inheritance for himself.

Owen hires the disreputable Hicks, and later a Gypsy leader called Balthazar, to sabotage Pauline's plans, or kidnap or murder her, and often Harry comes to her rescue when she is trapped on a cliff or tied up in a house set afire. As the series goes on she is also shown to be able to extricate herself from various predicaments. Finally, after she ends up trapped on an abandoned ship being used for target practice by the Navy and is genuinely terrified by the experience, Pauline decides she has had enough of adventuring and agrees to marry Harry. Owen is drowned by a sailor he has refused to allow to blackmail him, and all is well.

== Cast ==
- Pearl White as Pauline Marvin
- Crane Wilbur as Harry Marvin
- Paul Panzer as Raymond Owen (Called Koerner in the European release)
- Edward José as Sanford Marvin
- Francis Carlyle as Montgomery Hicks, Owen's henchman
- Clifford Bruce as Gypsy leader Balthazar
- Donald MacKenzie as Blinky Bill
- Jack Standing as Lieutenant Summers
- Eleanor Woodruff as Lucille

== Chapter titles ==
The original serial episodes had no titles, only episode numbers. Titles for episodes have been applied to them from the condensed Pathé release of the serial or sometimes as derived from novelizations of the serial.

The original 20 episodes contained the following story elements:

1. MUMMY CASE/WILL: Pauline's ambition to have adventures and write about them before marrying, Egyptian mummy speaks to Mr. Marvin, Death of Marvin and Owen's plot to kill Pauline and gain her inheritance
2. AIRFIELD: Owen tampers with an airplane he thinks Pauline will fly and causes it to crash
3. OLD SAILOR'S STORY: Blinky Bill the sailor tells a story of mutiny and treasure
4. TREASURE ISLAND: Expedition to an island to recover lost treasure; bomb on board ship
5. RECEPTION/ABDUCTION BY CHINESE: Pearl charms Signor Baskinelli, seized by Chinamen, imprisoned in a Joss House
6. BALLOON/CLIFF: Owen and Hicks conspire to set Pauline aloft in a balloon, rescue from cliff's edge
7. HOUSE FIRE/WESTERN ACTION: Pauline trapped in abandoned house set afire, Harry rescues her, she travels West and is kidnapped
8. INDIANS: Pauline is believed to be a goddess and tested by an Indian tribe
9. DEVIL'S ISLAND: Pauline acts in a movie for director Louis Gasnier
10. SMUGGLERS: Lighthouse, rocket gun
11. SOPHIE MACALLEN'S WEDDING: Escaped lions, auto crash
12. CAPTURED BY GYPSIES: Pauline abducted, Harry fights Balthazar
13. SERPENT IN THE GARDEN: Snake in basket, steeplechase, house party in Adirondacks, cliff's edge
14. TRAPPED IN RUINED MILL: Trapped by rising water, escape on high telegraph wire
15. DUEL/AUTO RACE: Ferrari challenges Harry to duel, auto race, car sabotaged by Owen
16. THE GERM: "Drowning disease" caused by germ
17. DOG AND COUNTERFEITERS: Pauline's dog abducted by counterfeiters
18. SUBMARINE: Spy sabotages submarine, Pauline is on board
19. FAKE PUBLISHER: Hotel trap, circus car, escaped ape
20. FLOATING COFFIN: Pauline takes motorboat to abandoned ship used for target practice by Navy men

Titles of the Pathé 9-episode condensed and re-edited re-release stories which have been used subsequently were:

1. "Par le Vertige et Par le Feu" (Trial by Fire (US), Vertigo and Fire, or From Cloud to Cliff)
2. "La Déesse du Far-West" (Goddess of the Far West)
3. "La Trésor du Pirate" (The Pirate Treasure)
4. "Le Virage Mortel" (The Deadly Turning (US), The Deadly Curve)
5. "La Fil Aerien" (A Watery Doom (US), The Aerial Wire)
6. "L'Aile Brisée" (The Shattered Plane (US), The Broken Wing)
7. "La Plongée Tragique" (The Tragic Plunge)
8. "Le Reptile Sous les Fleurs" (The Snake in the Flowers (US), The Serpent in the Flowers)
9. "Le Cercueil Flottant" (The Floating Coffin)

== Behind the scenes ==
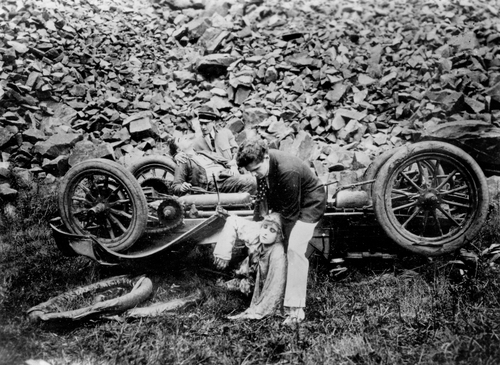
Scene from The Perils of Pauline

Pearl White was hesitant to accept the title role, but signed up for $250/week (equivalent to $8,144 in 2025) and a large amount of publicity.

William Randolph Hearst was involved in plot development. He was also present at the premiere at Loew's Broadway Theatre, on March 23, 1914. According to The Truth About Pearl White by Wallace E. Davis, the general release was approximately April 1, 1914.

E. A. McManus, head of the Hearst-Vitagraph service organization, proved how successful a serial could be. He co-operated with the largest film equipment and production company in the world at that time, France-based Pathé, to produce the serial, which was Pathé's first entry into the medium. George B. Seitz tried to follow the cliffhanging pattern of The Adventures of Kathlyn but each chapter was mostly self-contained.

After retiring from law enforcement, William J. Flynn, former director of the Bureau of Investigation (forerunner of the FBI), became a scenario writer for the motion picture industry through his acquaintance with the actor King Baggot, who was considered the greatest film star in the country in 1912. Producers Theodore and Leopold Wharton commissioned him to write story lines for their films, including Pauline. The Whartons also eventually adapted Flynn's experiences into a 20-part spy thriller titled The Eagle's Eye (1918), starring Baggot.

Surviving chapters of the French condensation of Pauline are noteworthy for the unintentionally funny re-translations of their title cards and dialogue captions in the English version, filled with misspellings, poor punctuation and grammar, and odd expressions. The film was recut and adapted for home-movie use, and all of the printed captions were translated into French. Later, when the American home-movie industry beckoned, the original English titles had been scrapped, so the French technicians tried to translate the titles back into English. These errors have also been blamed on Louis J. Gasnier, director and supervisor of the production. Gasnier, as explained by Crane Wilbur, made linguistic mistakes that confused the French-speaking crew. The new title cards also renamed the villain's character Raymond Owen as "Koerner", in reference to German "villainy" during World War I.

Episode 1 : Trial by Fire

Much of the film was shot in Fort Lee, New Jersey, where many early film studios in America's first motion picture industry were based at the beginning of the 20th century. Scenes were also filmed in Pittsburgh, Pennsylvania and Staten Island, New York. The term "cliffhanger" may have originated with the series, owing to a number of episodes filmed on or around the New Jersey Palisades, though it is also likely to refer to situations in stories of this type where the hero or heroine is hanging from a cliff, seemingly with no way out, until the next episode or last-minute resolution.

Pearl White performed most of her own stunts for the serial, but also was stunt doubled by a man. Filmed in the Adirondacks in New York, the stunt double rode a horse off a cliff into the lake below. Considerable risk was involved. In one incident, a balloon carrying White escaped and carried her across the Hudson River into a storm, before landing miles away. In another incident her back was permanently injured in a fall.

One of the more famous scenes in the serial which depicted a curved railroad bridge was supposedly the Ingham Creek trestle in New Hope, Pennsylvania on the Reading Company's New Hope Branch (now the New Hope and Ivyland Railroad line). The railroad is a tourist attraction today. Other supposed locations for railroad scenes included the Belvidere-Delaware Railroad in Lambertville and Raven Rock, New Jersey and the Long Island Rail Road in the Hamptons on Long Island. These stories are likely legends since there were no major scenes involving action with trains in the serial.

Milton Berle claimed The Perils of Pauline as his first film appearance, playing the character of a young boy, though this has never been independently verified and is unlikely as no child characters appear in the serial. The serial did mark one of the early credits for the cinematographer Arthur C. Miller, who was transferred to the project from the Pathé News department.

Pathé established an American factory and studio facility in Jersey City, New Jersey in 1910, and in 1913 established the Eclectic Film Company as a subsidiary distribution company for both its American and European products. Although the Jersey City plant produced moderately popular comedies, dramas, and newsreels largely directed at the US market, Pauline was the first American-made Pathé effort to achieve worldwide success under the Eclectic banner.

The final peril has Pauline sitting in a target boat as the Navy opens fire. The idea was also used in To the Shores of Tripoli (1942).

== Sequels and remakes ==
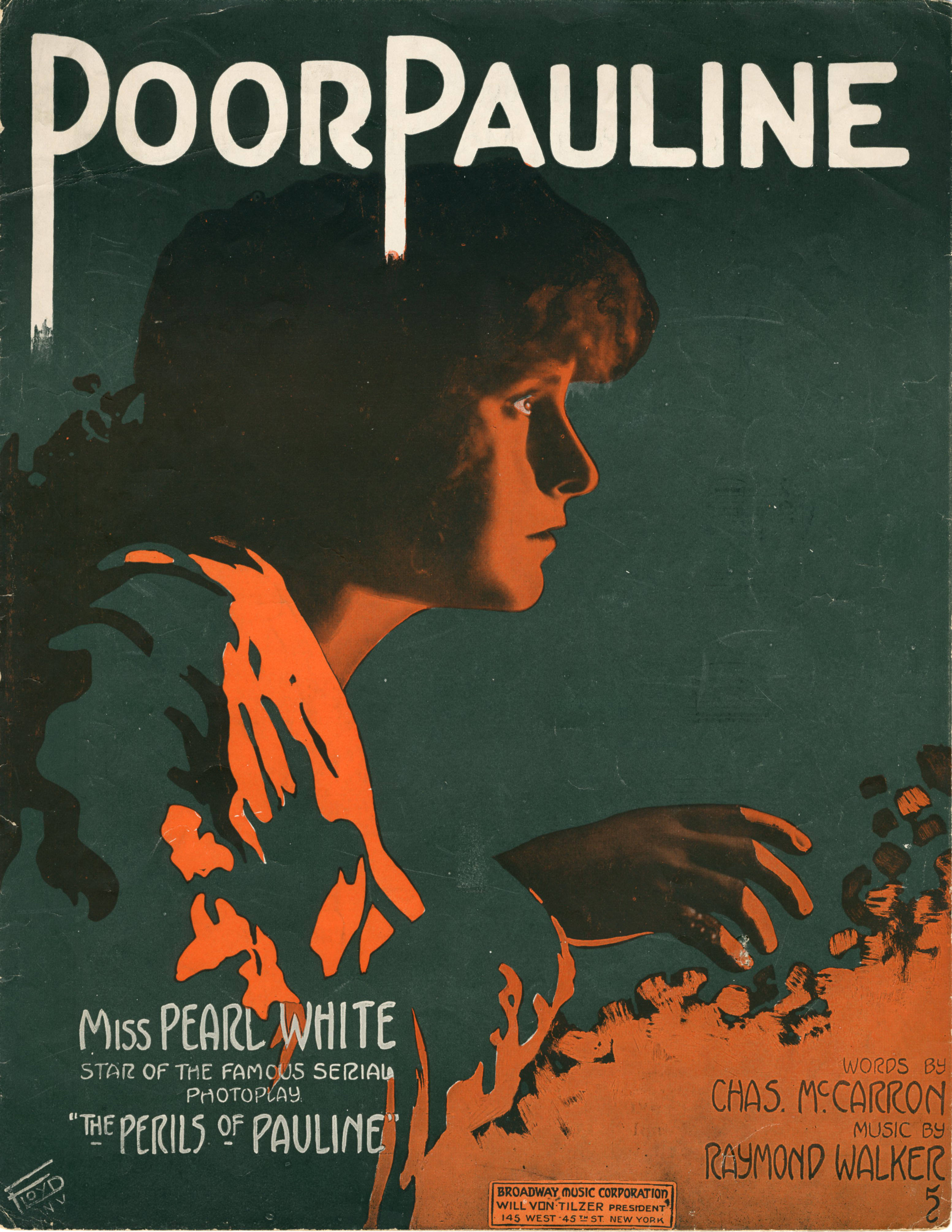
Sheet music cover for a song inspired by the serial

This successful serial was quickly followed by The Exploits of Elaine, also starring White. Many imitations and parodies followed, heralding the first golden age of the American film serial.

The title The Perils of Pauline was reused by Universal Studios for a 1933 sound serial with a different plot, by Paramount Pictures as the Betty Hutton vehicle The Perils of Pauline (1947), and by Universal again in 1967 as an updated comedy.

An abortive mixed-media musical was planned to be based on the film, called Who's That Girl?, meant to be premiered by The Boys from Syracuse producer Richard York on Broadway in 1970, with a book written by Lewis Banchi and Milburn Smith, and with the planned participation of the songwriting duo Ray Evans and Jay Livingston.

== Legacy ==
The Perils of Pauline is the prime example of what scholar Ben Singer has called the "serial-queen melodrama". There has been a recent reassessment of Singer's model in light of broader film forms.

The film's style was later subject to nostalgic caricature in many forms (e.g. Dudley Do-Right), but the original heroine was neither as helpless as the caricatures, nor did the original series include the much-parodied "tied to railroad tracks" or "tied to buzzsaw" scenarios which appeared in later films in this vein. Even the title phrase "Perils of" was often adopted by later serials, for example, in Universal's Perils of the Secret Service, Perils of the Wild, and Perils of the Yukon. and Republic Pictures' Perils of Nyoka.

The 1969–70 cartoon series The Perils of Penelope Pitstop was patterned after this serial, and included the plot point of the villain trying to eliminate the heroine so he can keep her inheritance.

The Thunderbirds episode "The Perils of Penelope" was inspired by The Perils of Pauline.

== See also ==
- List of film serials
- List of film serials by studio
- List of incomplete or partially lost films
- Damsel in distress
