= The Romance of Elaine =

1915 film

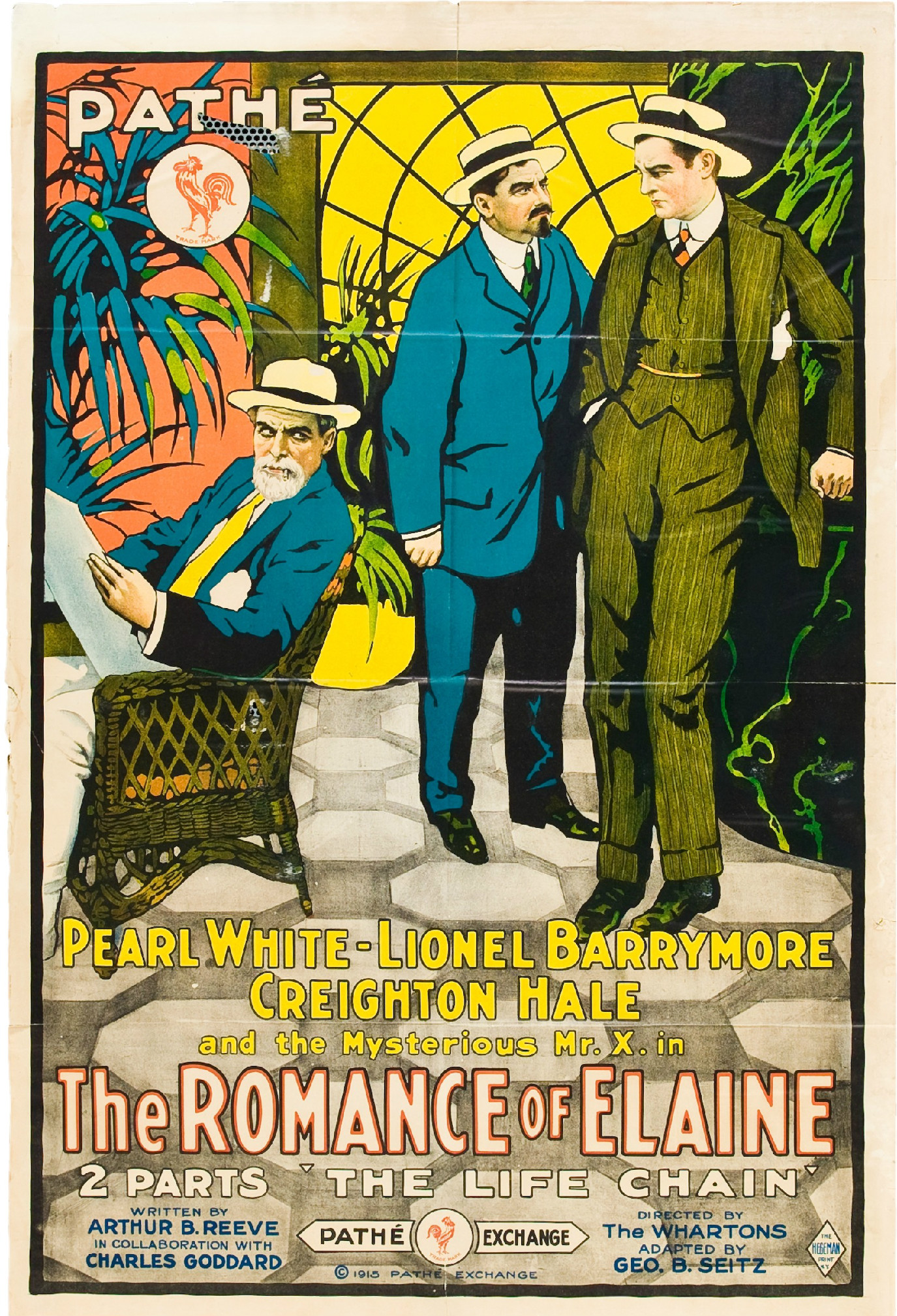
- Film poster
- Directed by: George B. Seitz; Leopold Wharton; Theodore Wharton
- Written by: Charles W. Goddard; Basil Dickey from the novel by Arthur B. Reeve
- Produced by: Leopold Wharton; Theodore Wharton
- Starring: Pearl White; Creighton Hale
- Cinematography: Levi Bacon; Robin H. Townley
- Distributed by: Pathé Exchange; Whartons Studio
- Release date: June 14, 1915
- Running time: 12 episodes
- Country: United States
- Languages: Silent; English intertitles

The Romance of Elaine is a 1915 American silent adventure film serial directed by George B. Seitz, Leopold Wharton and Theodore Wharton, based on the novel by Arthur B. Reeve. The film is considered to be lost.

== Cast ==
- Pearl White as Elaine Dodge
- Creighton Hale as Walter Jameson
- Lionel Barrymore as Marcus Del Mar / Mr. X
- Arnold Daly as Detective Craig Kennedy
- Warner Oland
- Bessie Wharton as Aunt Josephine
- George B. Seitz
- Howard Cody (uncredited)
- Paul Everton (uncredited)
- Robin H. Townley (uncredited)
- Louis Wolheim (uncredited)

== Chapter titles ==
1. The Lost Torpedo
2. The Gray Friar
3. The Vanishing Man
4. The Submarine Harbor
5. The Conspirators
6. The Wireless Detective
7. The Death Cloud
8. The Search Light Gun
9. The Life Chain
10. The Flash
11. The Disappearing Helmets
12. The Triumph of Elaine

== See also ==
- List of lost films
