= The New Exploits of Elaine =

1915 film

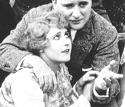
- Screenshot of Pearl White
- Directed by: Louis J. Gasnier; Leopold Wharton; Theodore Wharton
- Written by: Arthur B. Reeve
- Produced by: Leopold Wharton; Theodore Wharton
- Starring: Pearl White; Creighton Hale
- Distributed by: Pathé Exchange; Wharton Studios
- Release date: April 5, 1915
- Running time: 10 episodes
- Country: United States
- Language: Silent (English intertitles)

The New Exploits of Elaine is a 1915 American action film serial directed by Louis J. Gasnier, Leopold Wharton, and Theodore Wharton. It is presumed to be lost.

== Cast ==
- Pearl White as Elaine Dodge
- Creighton Hale as Walter Jameson
- Arnold Daly as Detective Craig Kennedy
- Edwin Arden as Wu Fang. Wu Fang appeared in several Pearl White serials. The name was based on a Chinese diplomat. Wu Ting Fang was a Chinese diplomat in Washington and wrote America, through the spectacles of an Oriental diplomat (excerpted in The New York Times, March 22, 1914). This was published less than a year before Arthur B. Reeve created the villain character.
- M.W. Rale as Long Sin. (Long Sin, the Yellow Peril character from the first serial, became an agent of Wu Fang in this serial.)
- Bessie Wharton as Aunt Josephine
- Gazelle Marche as Inez "Innocent Inez"

== Chapter titles ==
1. The Serpent Sign
2. The Cryptic Ring
3. The Watching Eye
4. The Vengeance of Wu Fang
5. The Saving Circles
6. Spontaneous Combustion
7. The Ear In The Wall
8. The Opium Smugglers
9. The Tell-Tale Heart
10. Shadows of War

== See also ==
- List of lost films
- List of partially lost films
