= Leopold Wharton =

American film director

- Born: September 1, 1870; Manchester, England
- Died: September 27, 1927 (aged 57); New York City, U.S.
- Occupation: Film director
- Years active: 1911–1922

Leopold Wharton (September 1, 1870 – September 27, 1927) was an American film director, producer and writer. He directed 37 films between 1911 and 1922, including the 1915 film The New Adventures of J. Rufus Wallingford, which featured Oliver Hardy. In 1920, Wharton joined The Lambs Club.

He was the brother of Theodore Wharton, who was also a film director. In the silent era they made films in a studio in Ithaca, New York. Their productions included the 15-episode serial Beatrice Fairfax for International Film Service. After working in Ithaca 1915–1919, the brothers moved their operations to California.

He was born in Manchester, England, and died in New York City.

== Selected filmography ==
- The Exploits of Elaine (1914)
- The New Adventures of J. Rufus Wallingford (1915)
- The New Exploits of Elaine (1915)
- The Romance of Elaine (1915)
- The Lottery Man (1916)
- Patria (1917)
- The Great White Trail (1917)
- The Eagle's Eye (1918)
- Mr. Potter of Texas (1922)
- Mr. Bingle (1922), a San Antonio Pictures production
