= Unmasked (1929 film) =

1929 film

- Directed by: Edgar Lewis
- Written by: Edward Clark; Albert Cowles; Bert Ennis; Arthur B. Reeve
- Produced by: Adolph Weiss; Louis Weiss; Max Weiss
- Starring: Robert Warwick; Milton Krims; Sam Ash
- Edited by: Martin G. Cohn
- Production company: Artclass Pictures
- Distributed by: Weiss Brothers
- Release date: December 15, 1929
- Running time: 62 minutes
- Country: United States
- Language: English

Unmasked is a 1929 American mystery film directed by Edgar Lewis and starring Robert Warwick, Milton Krims and Sam Ash. It was produced by the Poverty Row studio Artclass Pictures controlled by the Weiss Brothers, utilizing the phonofilm sound system. It features the fictional detective Craig Kennedy created by Arthur B. Reeve.

== Cast ==
- Robert Warwick as Craig Kennedy
- Milton Krims as Prince Hamid
- Sam Ash as Billy Mathews
- Charles Slattery as Inspector Collins
- Sue Conroy as Mary Wayne
- Lyons Wickland as Larry Jamieson
- William Corbett as Franklin Ward
- Royal Byron as Cafferty
- Marie Burke as Mrs. Brookfield
- Kate Roemer as Madam Ramon
- Helen Mitchel as Mrs. Ward
- Waldo Edwards as Gordon Hayes
- Clyde Dilson as Imposter

== Bibliography ==
- Pitts, Michael R. Poverty Row Studios, 1929–1940: An Illustrated History of 55 Independent Film Companies, with a Filmography for Each. McFarland & Company, 2005.
