= Samuel Ash =

Sam Ash
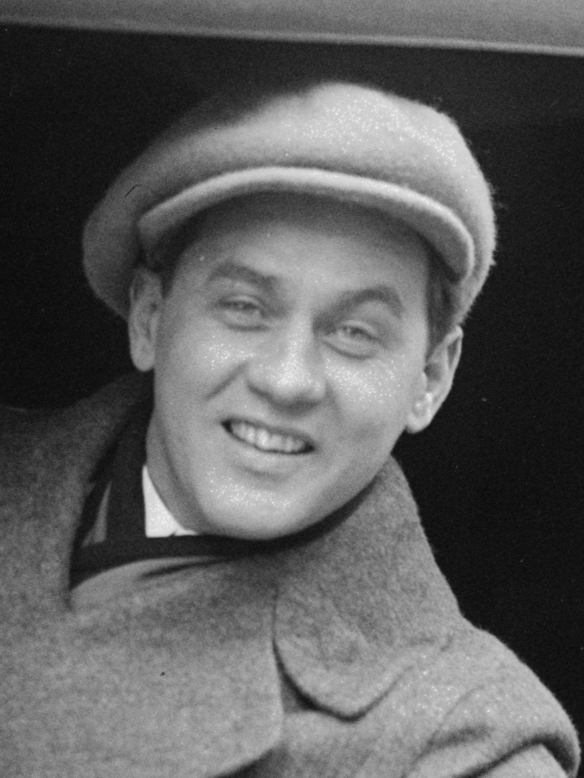
- Ash in 1918

Background information
- Born: Samuel Howard Ash; August 28, 1884; Campbell County, Kentucky, US
- Died: October 20, 1951 (aged 67) Hollywood, California
- Genres: Vaudeville, musical theatre, films
- Occupations: Singer, actor
- Years active: 1914–1951
- Labels: Columbia, Emerson, OKeh, Grey Gull, Gennett

Samuel Howard Ash (August 28, 1884 – October 20, 1951) was an American vaudeville performer, singer, and movie actor who appeared in minor roles in over 200 films, including It's a Wonderful Life.

== Biography ==
He was born in Campbell County, Kentucky, of English-born parents who had immigrated to the US. By 1900 he was living with his parents and siblings in Cincinnati, Ohio, and in 1910 lived in Chicago. He was unrelated to Sam Ash, born Samuel Ashkynase (1897–1956), founder of the eponymous musical instrument store, despite some erroneous claims that they were one and the same person.

He first recorded as a tenor singer for Columbia Records in 1914, credited as Samuel Ash, and the following year found success in a duet with Elida Morris, "Hello Frisco!" from the Broadway musical Ziegfeld Follies of 1915. In December 1915 he appeared on the Broadway stage, in a leading role in Rudolf Friml's operetta Katinka, which ran for over 200 performances. He recorded regularly for Columbia over the next few years. In 1915 he made one of his most commercially successful recordings, "America, I Love You", and in 1917 he recorded "Cleopatra Had a Jazz Band". His regular appearances in Broadway revues included Doing Our Bit (1917), and the musicals Monte Cristo Jr. and Oh, What A Girl! (both 1919), among others. In the 1920s he continued to record for Columbia as well as for a number of other record labels, including Little Wonder, Gennett, Grey Gull, and OKeh. He also continued to appear in Broadway musicals, including Some Party in 1922, The Passing Show of 1922, and Houseboat on the Styx in 1928.

From 1929, he was based in Hollywood. He made his film debut that year, third on the bill as a suspect in the Craig Kennedy mystery Unmasked, starring Robert Warwick in his first "talkie". Over the next two decades he had hundreds of small parts in movies, playing characters such as waiters, news vendors, ship stewards, and reporters. In Mad Love, starring Peter Lorre, his role was one of the detectives seeking the murderer. In It's a Wonderful Life, in 1946, he played the part of the nervous bank teller trying to calm the crowd when they demand their savings. Ash also featured in a number of popular film serials such as Dick Tracy, The Masked Marvel, and Captain America. He appeared in 205 movies between 1929 and 1953; his last two films were released posthumously.

He died in Hollywood in 1951, at the age of 67, and was buried at Forest Lawn Memorial Park.

== Selected filmography ==
- Unmasked (1929)
- The Merry Widow (1934)
- Circus Shadows (1935)
- Anything Goes (1936)
- San Francisco (1936)
- Madame X (1937)
- Marie Antoinette (1938)
- Alexander's Ragtime Band (1938) – Critic in Audience at Army Show
- Some Like It Hot (1939)
- Mr. Smith Goes to Washington (1939)
- Young Mr. Lincoln (1939)
- The Secret Seven (1940)
- Citizen Kane (1941) – Man at Boat Dock (uncredited)
- The Male Animal (1942)
- Roxie Hart (1942)
- Mr. Skeffington (1944)
- Cover Girl (1944)
- George White's Scandals (1945)
- The Stork Club (1945)
- It's a Wonderful Life (1946) – Nervous Banker (uncredited)
- Gilda (1946)
- The Killers (1946)
- All the King's Men (1949)
- Samson and Delilah (1949)
