= Craig Kennedy, Criminologist =

American syndicated TV detective series (1950s)

- Based on: Craig Kennedy by Arthur B. Reeve
- Written by: Ande Lamb
- Directed by: Harry L. Fraser; Adrian Weiss
- Starring: Donald Woods; Sydney Mason; Lewis Wilson; Bill Arnold
- Composer: Lee Zahler
- Country of origin: United States
- Original language: English
- No. of seasons: 1
- No. of episodes: 26

Production
- Cinematography: Elmer Dyer
- Running time: 22–26 minutes

Original release
- Release: 1952 – 1953

Craig Kennedy, Criminologist is a syndicated American detective television series. Produced in 1951, it was an early example of a series becoming popular in first-run syndication. Reruns were being broadcast in the United States as late as 1958.

== Overview ==
The Craig Kennedy character, created in 1910 by Arthur B. Reeve, solved crimes by means of scientific deductions. In the television adaptation, Donald Woods portrayed Kennedy as a senior staff member of Columbia University, equipped with his own laboratory and audio and video monitors. Kennedy regularly interacted with police inspector J. J. Burke, each offering the other assistance with their cases. Burke was portrayed by Sydney Mason. Lewis Wilson, best known today as the star of the 1943 Batman serial, played crime reporter Walter Jameson.

== Production ==
Adrian Weiss was the producer and director. Twenty-six half-hour episodes were filmed in Hollywood at Key-West Studios. The Weiss studio gained sales of the show by promising that if it did not have higher ratings than its competition in its first 13 weeks, there would be no charge for the second 13 weeks' episodes.

The show was filmed cheaply but efficiently, with veteran Weiss director Harry L. Fraser on hand for many episodes. Screenwriter Ande Lamb wrote all 26 episodes, credited with the teleplays for 17 shows and the original stories for the other nine. A stock company of character actors played different parts as the series progressed, in the manner of the successful Dragnet series: Jack Mulhall (who had himself starred as Craig Kennedy in the 1936 Weiss serial The Clutching Hand), Trudy Marshall, Lane Bradford, Tom Hubbard, William Justine, and Edna Holland, among others. Unlike Dragnet, which occasionally filmed scenes on location, Craig Kennedy was staged entirely indoors on studio sets. Background music came from the Lee Zahler library of orchestra scores composed for Hollywood films of the 1930s and 1940s.

== Critical response ==
Lee Zhito of Billboard gave Craig Kennedy, Criminologist good marks: "Craig Kennedy series reveals careful attention to production values seldom found in existing whodunits. Donald Woods convincingly plays the part of the quick-thinking criminologist whose nimble brain and hard fists assure a solution to the direct crimes before the reel's end. Sponsors in search of a mystery series that throws a fresh light on the same old whodunit formula would do well to consider Kennedy to solve his problems." An opposing view came from Ellis Walker of the Daily Palo Alto Times, who called the program "a class D mystery series". Walker expressed surprise at Woods's involvement in the show and suggested that the actor could not resist the money that he received.

== Conversion into feature films ==
In 1953 Anglo-Amalgamated Film Distributors Ltd. of London bought four episodes of Craig Kennedy, Criminologist with plans to combine them to create two hourlong features. The conversion also included having "a British personality" provide opening and closing narrations for the films, which were to be distributed to theaters in Great Britain. At least one feature version was released, titled Craig Kennedy, Criminologist and tradeshown in October 1953; it was rated "A" for adult audiences.

== Historical footnotes ==
Craig Kennedy, Criminologist was the first filmed TV program to be shown in U. S. Army hospitals in other countries. The show received excellent ratings in some cities, besting the top-rated I Love Lucy series on at least one occasion (in New Orleans, Louisiana: 50.5 for Kennedy vs. 48.5 for Lucy, according to Telepulse, Nov. 1953).
