= Lester Scharff =

American actor (1894–1962)

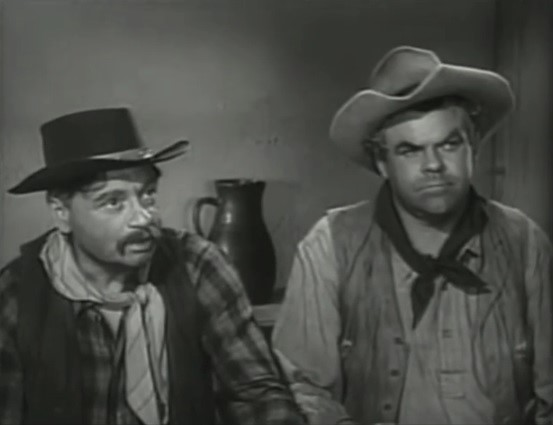
Lester Sharpe (left) and Wade Crosby in The Lone Ranger

Lester Scharff (March 21, 1894 – November 30, 1962) was an American character actor of stage and screen. He performed under his own name on the stage and in film until adopting the pseudonym Lester Sharpe in 1942. He began his career performing in light operas and musicals in the 1910s before branching out into stage plays in the 1920s. He appeared in five productions on Broadway between 1916 and 1933. After this he was primarily active as a film actor from 1935 through 1956. He also made appearances on American television from 1949 through 1957, and produced the 1944 film Thoroughbreds.

== Early life ==
The son of Isadore and Bertha Scharff, Lester Scharff was born in New York City on March 21, 1894. Both of his parents were born in Germany with his father becoming a naturalized American citizen in 1876 and his mother becoming an American citizen nine years later.

== Stage career ==
Scharff was a bass who worked in musical theatre. His first significant part on the stage was Carfuso in Sigmund Romberg's light opera The Girl from Brazil which was adapted from Robert Winterberg's 1915 German operetta Die schöne Schwedin. It was first given under the title A Brazilian Honeymoon at the Wilbur Theatre in Boston where it ran in May 1916. Scharff was still playing the role of Carfuso when the production reached Broadway's 44th Street Theatre on August 30, 1916 where it ran for 61 performances before continuing on its tour. One of the stops on the tour with Scharff in the cast included the Princess Theatre in Montreal in December 1916.

On January 29, 1917 Scharff performed in the United States premiere of Oscar Straus's operetta Die Schöne Unbekannte which was performed using an English language translation entitled The Beautiful Unknown. The production then toured to the Academy of Music in Baltimore. In 1918 he performed a pianologue number in vaudeville, and worked as theatrical booking agent for producer Henry W. Savage. In December 1918 he left his position with Savage to work for theatrical impresario Chamberlain Brown as the head of his musical department.

Scharff was a featured bass vocalist in Reginald De Koven's short lived musical Yesterday in 1919. That same year he returned to Broadway in the small part of the Headwaiter in Jacques Presburg and Charles Jules's musical Oh, What A Girl! which played at the Shubert Theatre, and then toured to Massachusetts, Pennsylvania, Ohio, and Canada. He was still with that tour when it reached the Shubert Theatre in Detroit, Michigan in January 1920. In 1923 he performed in Harry Delf's musical Sun Showers. and portrayed Quinn in the Broadway production of Owen Davis's play Home Fires at the 39th Street Theatre. He returned to Broadway twice more during his career; portraying the photographer in Theodore Westman Jr.'s play Solid Ivory at the Central Theatre in 1925, and the Mock Turtle in Eva Le Gallienne and Florida Friebus's stage adaptation of Alice in Wonderland at the Civic Repertory Theatre in 1932-1933.

== Screen career ==
Scharff was a character actor who portrayed mostly minor roles in films. Using his own name, Lester Scharff, he made his film debut in the 1927 Paramount Pictures silent drama film New York in the duel roles of Sharpe and Izzy Blumenstein. He continued to use his own name for credited roles in films into the early 1940s. Some of the films where he was credited under him real name included The Great Commandment (1939, as the First Zealot), Earthbound (1940, as the Detective), The Man Who Wouldn't Talk (1940, as Henri Picot), Remedy for Riches (1940, as Eddie), and Secrets of the Lone Wolf (1941, as Deputy Duval).

In 1942 Scharff adopted the pseudonym Lester Sharpe for his work in film. He used that name in film into the 1950s. One of his more significant parts under this name was Blum, the benevolent elderly tailor in the 1952 film Carrie.

In 1944 Scharff signed a contract with Republic Pictures as a producer. He produced only one film with the company; Thoroughbreds in 1944.

== Later life ==
Scharff died in Los Angeles, California on November 30, 1962.

== Partial filmography ==
=== Actor ===
- New York (1927) as Sharpe and Izzy Blumenstein (as Lester Scharff)
- The Great Commandment (1939) as the First Zealot (as Lester Scharff)
- Earthbound (1940) as Detective (as Lester Scharff)
- The Man Who Wouldn't Talk (1940) as Henri Picot (as Lester Scharff)
- Remedy for Riches (1940) as Eddie (as Lester Scharff)
- Secrets of the Lone Wolf (1941) as Deputy Duval (as Lester Scharff)
- Time to Kill (1942) as Elisha Washburn (as Lester Sharpe)
- Desperate Journey (1942) as a Driver (as Lester Sharpe)
- This Land Is Mine (1943) as German lieutenant (as Lester Sharpe)
- Hangmen Also Die! (1943) as Rudy (as Lester Sharpe)
- The Purple V (1943) as Nazi Doctor (as Lester Sharpe)
- The Strange Death of Adolf Hitler (1943) as Dr. Kaltenbach (as Lester Sharpe)
- The Mummy's Ghost (1944) as Dr. Ayab (as Lester Sharpe)
- Lady in the Dark (1944) as Pianist (as Lester Sharpe)
- The Lost Weekend (1945), as Jewish Man (as Lester Sharpe)
- Port Said (1948) as Lt. Zaki (as Lester Sharpe)
- Call Northside 777 (1948) as a Technician (as Lester Sharpe)
- Song of My Heart (1948) as Nikolai Rubinstein (as Lester Sharpe)
- The Gallant Legion (1948) as Matt Kirby (as Lester Sharpe)
- Letter from an Unknown Woman (1948) as Critic (as Lester Sharpe)
- Oh, You Beautiful Doll (1949) as music store proprietor (as Lester Sharpe)
- Amazon Quest (1949) as Clerk (as Lester Sharpe)
- I Was a Male War Bride (1949) as Waiter (as Lester Sharpe)
- Mystery Submarine (1950) as Citadel Captain (as Lester Sharpe)
- Unmasked (1950) as Mr. Schmidt (as Lester Sharpe)
- The Vicious Years (1950) as Matteo (as Lester Sharpe)
- The Flying Saucer (1950) as Colonel Marikoff (as Lester Sharpe)
- The Desert Hawk (1950) as a merchant (as Lester Sharpe)
- Mask of the Avenger (1951) as Majordomo (as Lester Sharpe)
- Carrie (1952) as Blum (as Lester Sharpe)

=== Producer ===
- Thoroughbreds (1944) (as Lester Sharpe)
