= The Radio Detective =

1926 film

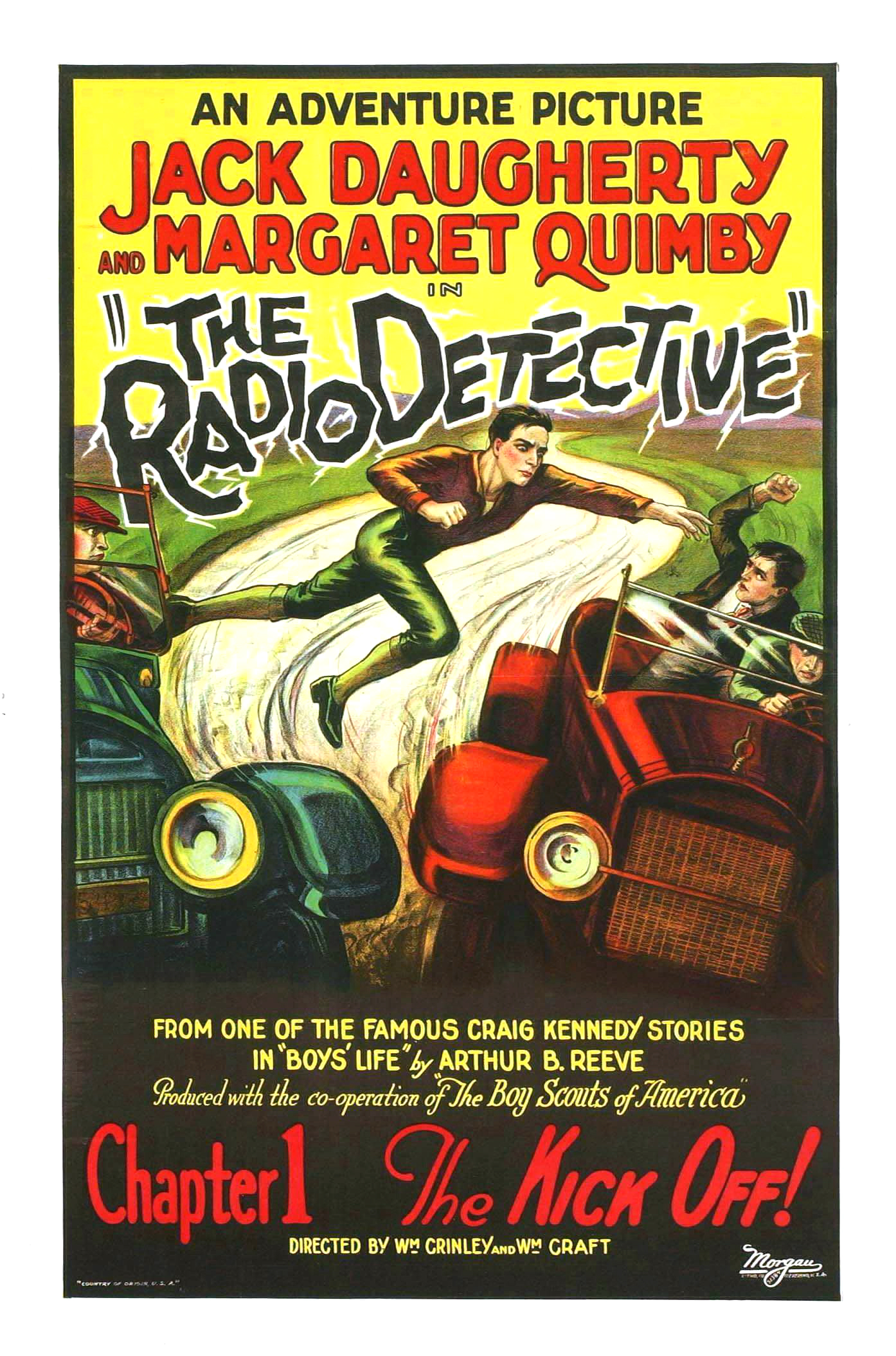
- Film poster
- Directed by: William James Craft; William A. Crinley
- Written by: Arthur B. Reeve
- Starring: Jack Dougherty; Margaret Quimby
- Distributed by: Universal Pictures
- Release date: April 25, 1926
- Running time: 10 episodes
- Country: United States
- Language: Silent with English intertitles

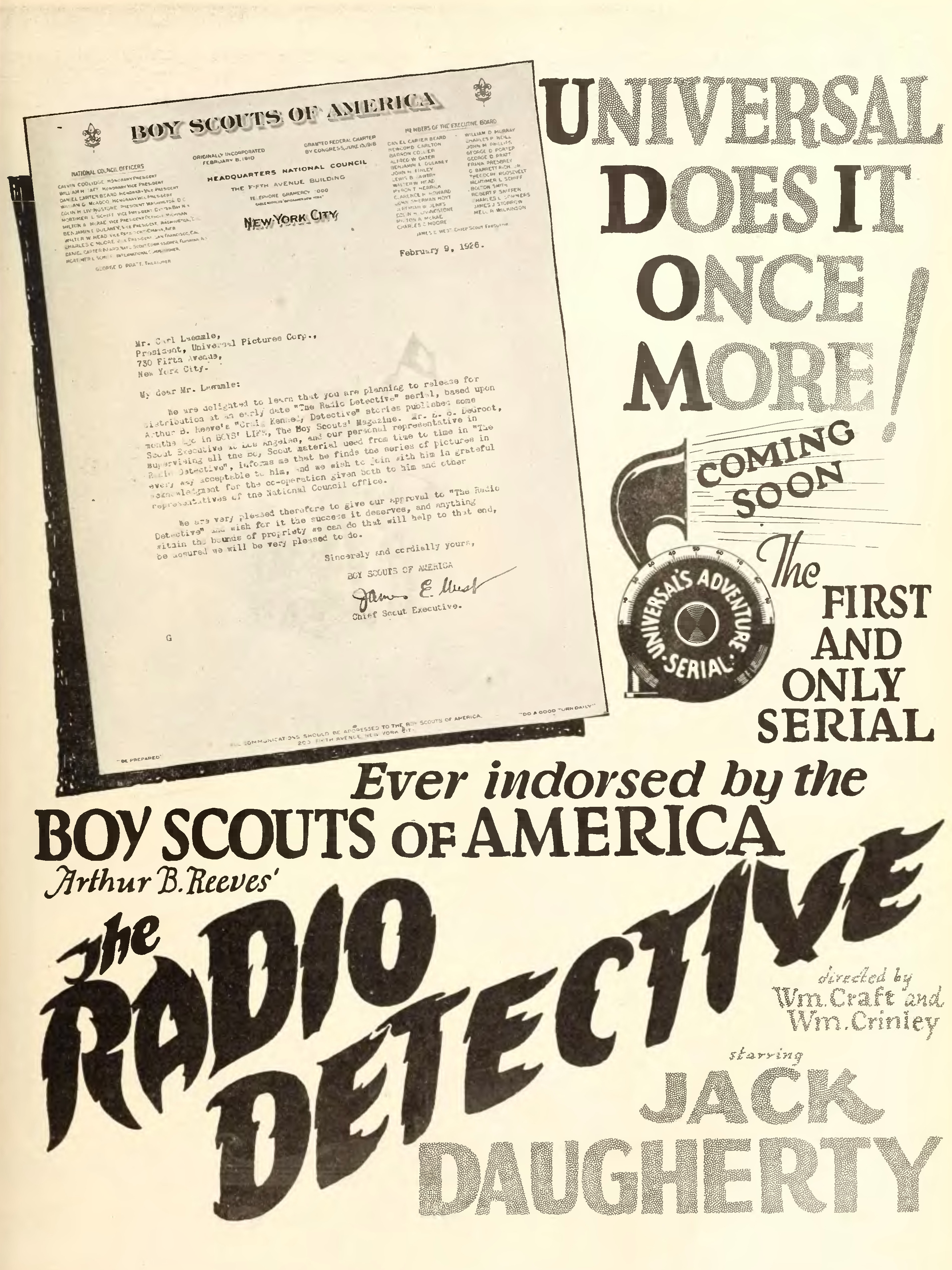
The Radio Detective ad in Motion Picture News, 1926

The Radio Detective is a 1926 American adventure film serial directed by William James Craft and William A. Crinley and released by Universal Pictures. The film is considered to be lost.

== Cast ==
- Jack Dougherty as Easton Evans (as Jack Daugherty)
- Margaret Quimby as Ruth Evans
- Jack Mower as Craig Kennedy
- Wallace Baldwin as Hank Hawkins, Crook
- Howard Enstedt as Ken Adams, Policeman
- John T. Prince as Professor Ronald Varis
- Florence Allen as Rae Varis
- Sammy Gervon as Crook
- Buck Connors
- George Williams
- Monte Montague

== List of episodes ==
- Chapter 1: The Kick Off!
- Chapter 2: The Radio Riddle
- Chapter 3: The Radio Wizard
- Chapter 4: Boy Scout Loyalty
- Chapter 5: The Radio Secret
- Chapter 6: Fighting For Love
- Chapter 7: The Tenderfoot Scout
- Chapter 8: The Truth Teller
- Chapter 9: The Fire Fiend
- Chapter 10: Radio Romance

== See also ==
- List of film serials
- List of film serials by studio
