= Amazon Quest =

- Theatrical release poster
- Directed by: Steve Sekely
- Screenplay by: Al Martin
- Story by: Irwin Gielgud
- Produced by: Max Alexander
- Starring: Tom Neal; Carole Mathews; Carole Donne; Don Zelaya; Ralph Graves; Joseph Crehan; Jack George; Joseph Granby; Edward Clark; Julian Rivero
- Cinematography: Guy Roe
- Edited by: Norman A. Cerf
- Production companies: M & A Alexander Productions Inc.
- Distributed by: Film Classics
- Release date: May 13, 1949
- Running time: 75 minutes
- Country: United States
- Language: English

Amazon Quest is a 1949 American adventure film directed by Steve Sekely and written by Al Martin. The film stars Tom Neal, Carole Mathews, Carole Donne, Don Zelaya, Ralph Graves, Joseph Crehan, Jack George, Joseph Granby, Edward Clark and Julian Rivero. The film was released on May 13, 1949, by Film Classics.

== Cast ==
- Tom Neal as Thomas Dekker Jr.
- Carole Mathews as Theresa Vasco
- Carole Donne as Anna Narden
- Don Zelaya as José Lobato
- Ralph Graves as Anna's Attorney
- Joseph Crehan as De Ruyter
- Jack George as Judge
- Joseph Granby as Mariano
- Edward Clark as Nicholas Handel
- Julian Rivero as Vasco
- Lester Sharpe as Clerk
- Zacharias Yaconelli as Clerk
- Don Dillaway as Guide
- Cosmo Sardo as Ringleader
- Paul Fierro as Lieutenant
- Frank Lackteen as Native Chief
