= Crossed Swords (1954 film) =

1954 film by Milton Krims

- 1954 theatrical poster
- Directed by: Milton Krims
- Written by: Milton Krims
- Produced by: J. Barret Mahon; Errol Flynn; Vittorio Vassarotti; John W. Bash
- Starring: Errol Flynn; Gina Lollobrigida; Cesare Danova; Nadia Gray
- Cinematography: Jack Cardiff
- Edited by: Derek Hawkins; Maria Rosada
- Music by: Gino Marinuzzi; Alessandro Cicognini
- Production companies: Errol Flynn Productions; Viva Films
- Distributed by: Titanus (Italy); United Artists (US)
- Release dates: 29 July 1954 (US); 17 September 1954 (Italy)
- Running time: 82 minutes
- Countries: Italy; United States
- Language: English
- Box office: 1,331,794 admissions (France)

Crossed Swords or The Teacher of Don Juan (Italian: Il Maestro di Don Giovanni) is a 1954 historical swashbuckling adventure film directed by Milton Krims and starring Errol Flynn, Gina Lollobrigida and Nadia Gray. It was co-production between Italy and the United States. It was shot at the Cinecittà Studios in Rome. The film's sets were designed by the art director Arrigo Equini.

== Plot ==
The film is set in Early Modern Italy in the Duchy of Sidona. Raniero and Renzo are two friends who have been travelling together for two years, having adventures, fighting duels and womanizing. Raniero is the son of the Duke of Sidona, and the elder Renzo his Don Juan-type mentor.

On their way back to Sidona after a two-year absence, Renzo and Raniero encounter Fulvia, a former lover of Renzo. She attacks him then invites him to her estate.

Fulvia's rich husband Gennarelli is at a meeting at Sidona. Pavoncello, the Duke's counselor, is suggesting a new law where all men under twenty must marry and produce children or face imprisonment. (The aim is to ensure future manpower to defend the duchy). The Duke is unsure whether the law is what the people want and refuses to sign it until he consults them.

Gennarelli returns to his estate and surprises Renzo and his wife. The two men fight a duel which Renzo easily wins. Renzo and Raniero head to the castle where the Duke welcomes them. The Duke's daughter, Francesca, regards Renzo as a bad influence on her brother but is attracted to him.

Fulvia arranges a joust with Indian sticks between Renzo and Pavoncello, who wants to marry Francesca. Both men are wounded and the duke stops the contest.

Gennarelli approaches Pavoncello, suggesting he use the proposed law to drive Renzo out of Sidona. Gennarelli and Pavoncello join forces to persuade the Duke to sign the law.

Renzo flees Sidona with Raniero. Pavoncello hires an assassin, Lenzi, to kill Renzo and Raniero. It is revealed that Pavoncello wants to take over Sidona and surrounding areas as well; he arranges Lenzi to hire two hundred mercenaries.

Renzo and Raniero are eating in a tavern when attacked by Lenzi's men but they defeat them. They return to the castle and overhear Fulvia talking to Gennarelli about the latter's plan with Pavoncello.

Renzo and Raniero are captured. Lenzi's mercenary army enters Sidona, and imprisons the Duke and Francesca.

Fulvia helps Renzo and Raniero to escape. They manage to rescue the Duke and Francesca and lead an uprising. Francesca uses the women of Sidona to seduce Lenzi's mercenaries. This enables Renzo to kill Lenzi, and for Raniero to raise the Duke's loyal supporters in rebellion. Renzo kills Pavoncello in a sword duel. Renzo agrees to marry Francesca.

== Cast ==
- Errol Flynn as Renzo
- Gina Lollobrigida as Francesca
- Cesare Danova as Raniero
- Nadia Gray as Fulvia
- Roldano Lupi as Pavoncello
- Alberto Rabagliati as Gennarelli
- Paola Mori as Tomasina
- Silvio Bagolini as Buio
- Renato Chiantoni as Spiga
- Riccardo Rioli as Lenzi
- Pietro Tordi as The Duke

== Production ==
=== Background ===
Milton Krims announced he was to write and produce a film called The Ninth Man in 1950 based on a 1920 novel by Mary Heaton Vorse set in Italy in the fifteenth century.

In 1952 it was announced Krims would make The Ninth Man with Errol Flynn in the lead for Constellation Films with J. Barrett Mahon to act on Flynn's behalf behind the scenes.

In January 1953 it was announced Flynn would star in Teacher of Don Juan, a co production between Errol Flynn Enterprises and Vittorio Vasserotti.

Flynn produced the film in association with Barry Mahon in an attempt to emulate the success of The Adventures of Don Juan (1948), which had sold well in Europe on its release by Warner Bros. John Bash helped Flynn finance the film.

=== Shoot ===
Filming took place in Italy in February 1953. It was shot at Cinecittà Studios in Rome with exteriors shot in the village of Lauro. It was the first role for Lollobrigida beyond the Italian market, and her fee was 30 million lira (est. $48,000). She made it immediately before Beat the Devil.

The movie was shot in Pathecolor, a new color process developed by Pathe Industries.

It was known during filming as The Master of Don Juan or Teacher of Don Juan.

== Reception ==
=== Critical ===
The Chicago Daily Tribune said the film "offers very little interest" apart from the photography.

Filmink magazine wrote "The most frustrating thing about the movie is that it's full of good ideas... but they don’t develop any of them."

=== Box office ===
Box office reception was disappointing – Flynn later claimed the film was sold "very badly". Dorothy Kilgallen later wrote that Flynn's share from the film "amounts to quite a pile of bills" but he never received the money because "they're all Washington-bound to defray his staggering tax debt."

=== Legacy ===
The experience prompted Flynn to try another production in Italy, the disastrous William Tell.
