= Oh, What A Girl! =

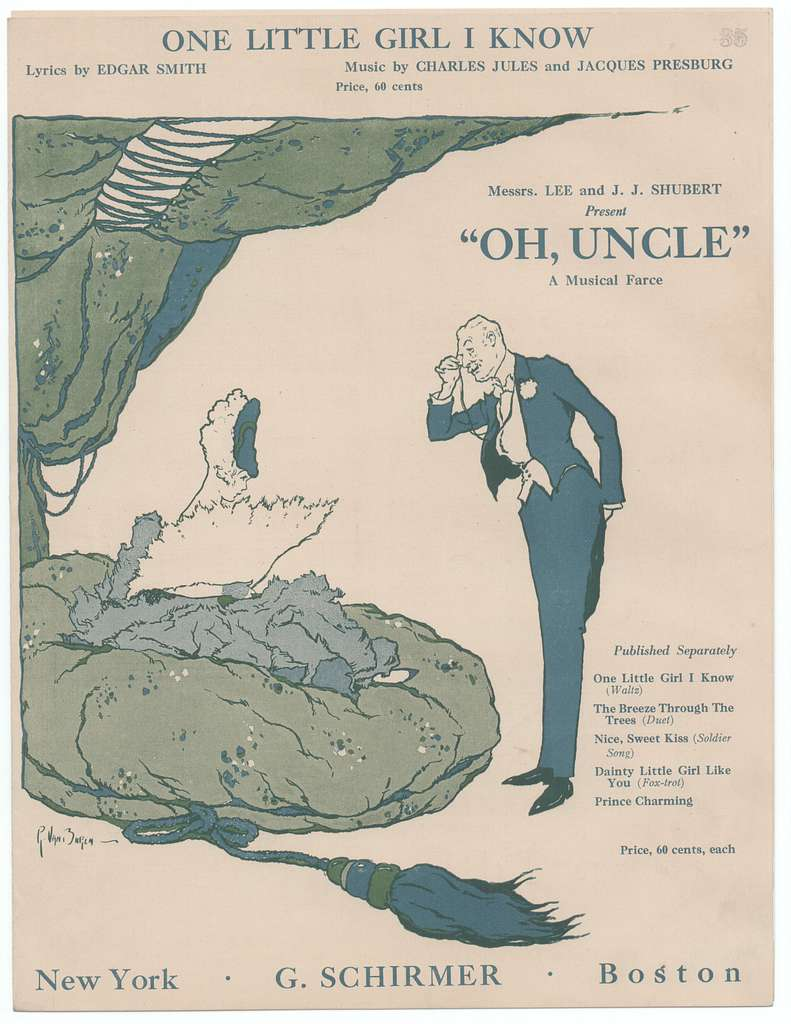
Front cover of 1919 sheet music for the song "One Little Girl I Know" from Oh, Uncle (later retitled Oh, What A Girl! for Broadway)

Oh, What A Girl!, also known as Oh, Uncle, is a musical in two acts with music by Jacques Presburg and Charlies Jules; a book and lyrics by Edgar Smith, Edward Clark, and Gus Kahn; The story concerns rich New York college boy Jack Rushton, whose romantic attachment to cabaret singer Margot Merrivale is opposed by his conservative uncle, Deacon Amos Titmouse, but the deacon finds himself tempted by the city and Margot herself. Jack's old girlfriend and the deacon's teetotaling wife arrive.

The musical was produced by the Shubert family. After tryouts in New Haven, Connecticut, and Philadelphia, Pennsylvania, the show played on Broadway in 1919 and then toured in North America. The work starred Sam Ash as Jack, Harry Kelly as the deacon, and Hazel Kirke as Margot.

== Plot ==
Act I

Jack Rushton is a well-to-do college student in New York City who resides in an upscale apartment on Riverside Drive with his valet, Washington. He is infatuated with the cabaret singer Margot Merrivale and is determined to marry her. His straight-laced uncle, Deacon Amos Titmouse from Cemetery Corners, New Jersey, disapproves of the relationship with this sophisticated city woman and wants Jack to wed his wholesome old girlfriend from rural New Jersey, Susie Smith. On a visit to New York City, the deacon fails to persuade Jack to change course and finds himself being tempted by the allures of Manhattan, including imbibing alcohol at the cabaret where Margot performs. The deacon abandons his conservative ways for a life of partying in New York and also becomes infatuated with Margot.

Act II

Both the deacon's wife, the temperance advocating Amanda Titmouse, and Susie Smith arrive in New York. Amanda puts her husband's meandering ways in check, the deacon gives Jack and Margot his blessing to their union, and Susie becomes engaged to Jack's best friend, Bill Corcoran, with whom she has fallen in love. All ends happily.

== Original cast ==
- Jack Rushton – Sam Ash
- Deacon Amos Titmouse (Jack's uncle) – Harry Kelly
- Margot Merrivalle (a cabaret singer) – Hazel Kirke
- Bill Corcoran (Jack's best friend) – Frank Fay
- Susie Smith (Jack's old girlfriend) – Nancy Fair
- Washington (Jack's valet) – Lew Cooper
- Amanda Titmouse (Amos's wife) – Elizabeth Moffat
- Lola Chappelle – Vera Groset
- Luigi Fravola (a composer) – Ignacio Martinetti
- Head Waiter – Lester Scharff

== Performance history ==
Oh, What A Girl! premiered under the title The Wrong Number at the Shubert Theatre in New Haven, Connecticut on April 7, 1919. It was renamed Oh, Uncle for a run at the Shubert Theater, Philadelphia, where it played in May 1919. It was renamed a second time to Oh, What A Girl! for its staging on Broadway at the Shubert Theatre, where it premiered on July 28, 1919 in the midst of a summer heat wave, which proved detrimental to ticket sales in an era before air conditioning in theaters. A week into the show's run a strike by Actors' Equity Association caused havoc on Broadway, and the production closed for five weeks. The show then re-opened and continued to run on Broadway until November 1, 1919 when it closed after 68 performances.

According to theatre historian Dan Dietz, the combination of the heat wave and the strike hurt the run in New York despite generally good critical reviews of the show. Toronto Star Weekly praised the work's "catchy score" and The Philadelphia Inquirer stated that it was "quite melodious and light and entertaining enough to make one almost forget the heat". The most successful tune in the production was Irving Berlin's "You'd Be Surprised", which was interpolated into the show. The valet character, Washington, was played in blackface.

After the musical closed in New York, it toured the United States and Canada into 1920. The title song "Oh, What A Girl!" was recorded by Sam Ash for Pathé Records in 1919. It was re-released in 1993 on volume four of the CD collection Music From The New York Stage 1890–1920.

== Musical numbers ==
Music by Jules and Presburg; with lyrics by Smith and Clark, except as noted:

=== Act 1 ===
- "Musical Poker Game" – Jack Rushton's friends
- "Gimme (This–Gimme This–Gimme That)" (music and lyrics by L. Wolfe Gilbert, Alex Sullivan and Nat Vincent) – Washington
- "Oh, What a Girl!" (lyrics by Smith) – Jack and boys
- "A Nice Sweet Kiss" (lyrics by Smith) – Margot Merrivale, Jack, Bill Corcoran and chorus
- "Fox Trot" – featured the dancers Renee Adoree and Lewis Sloden'
- "Dance" – performed by Ma-Belle
- "Oh, That Shimmy" – Bill and chorus
- "Travesty Opera" – Company

=== Act 2 ===
- "Medley of Old Songs" – performed by The Manhattan Comedy Four
- "Prince Charming" (lyrics by Clark) – Susie Smith and chorus
- "Get Him Up" – Bill, Margot, Lola Chappelle, Luigi Fravola and chorus
- "Dainty Little Girl (Like You)" (lyrics by Smith) – Bill and Susie
- "Breeze in the Trees" (lyrics by Smith) – Jack and Margot
- "Could You Teach Me?" – Bill, Amanda Titmouse and Luigi
- "Dance" – performed by Veronica Marquise
- "I've Got My Captain Working for Me Now" (music and lyrics by Irving Berlin) – Washington
- "(Such a) Baby" (music by Egbert Van Alstyne; lyrics by Gus Kahn) – Susie
- "Pot Pourri" – Company
