= Thoroughbreds (1944 film) =

1944 American drama film by George Blair

- Directed by: George Blair
- Screenplay by: Wellyn Totman; Franklin Coen
- Produced by: Lester Sharpe
- Starring: Tom Neal; Adele Mara; Roger Pryor; Paul Harvey; Eugene Gericke; Doodles Weaver
- Cinematography: William Bradford
- Edited by: Ralph Dixon
- Music by: Joseph Dubin
- Production company: Republic Pictures
- Distributed by: Republic Pictures
- Release date: December 23, 1944
- Running time: 56 minutes
- Country: United States
- Language: English

Thoroughbreds is a 1944 American drama film directed by George Blair, written by Wellyn Totman and Franklin Coen, and starring Tom Neal, Adele Mara, Roger Pryor, Paul Harvey, Eugene Gericke and Doodles Weaver. It was released on December 23, 1944, by Republic Pictures.

== Plot ==
Sgt. Rusty Curtis of the U.S. Cavalry division is unhappy about the Army's plan to replace horses with tanks. After a medical discharge, Rusty tries to buy his old military mount, Sireson, but wealthy socialite Sally Crandall outbids him. Sally is the fiancée of Rusty's old barracks mate, Jack Martin.

Sally's father hires Rusty to train the horse for a big steeplechase race. A rivalry begins because Sally has a favorite horse of her own, but when hers is hurt, she and Rusty declare a truce and begin a romantic relationship.

Jack returns and overhears a conversation leading him to believe Rusty intends to lose the race on purpose. The two men fight after Jack insists on riding the horse in the race, but Jack's fears are overcome when Rusty superbly rides Sireson to victory.

== Cast ==
- Tom Neal as Rusty Curtis
- Adele Mara as Sally Crandall
- Roger Pryor as Harold Matthews
- Paul Harvey as John Crandall
- Eugene Gericke as Jack Martin
- Doodles Weaver as Pvt. Mulrooney
- Eddie Hall as Dapper
- Tom London as Pop
- Charles Sullivan as Nails
- Alan Edwards as Maj. Lane
- Sam Bernard as Pete
- Buddy Gorman as Roberts

== See also ==
- List of films about horse racing
