= They Shall Have Music =

1939 musical film starring Jascha Heifetz

- Theatrical poster
- Directed by: Archie Mayo
- Screenplay by: Irma von Cube; John Howard Lawson
- Produced by: Samuel Goldwyn; Robert Riskin (Assoc prod)
- Starring: Jascha Heifetz; Joel McCrea; Andrea Leeds; Gene Reynolds
- Cinematography: Gregg Toland
- Edited by: Sherman Todd
- Music by: Alfred Newman
- Production company: Samuel Goldwyn Productions
- Distributed by: United Artists
- Release date: July 26, 1939
- Running time: 105 minutes
- Country: United States
- Language: English

They Shall Have Music is a 1939 musical film directed by Archie Mayo and starring famed violinist Jascha Heifetz (as himself), Joel McCrea, Andrea Leeds, and Gene Reynolds. The screenplay concerns a young runaway who finds his purpose in life after hearing Heifetz play, and the kindly master of a music school in financial difficulty takes him in. At the time the film was made, there were a number of music settlement schools in New York City; the Chatham Square Music School on Manhattan's Lower East Side was the model. The story of the school was also inspired in part by the career of the violinist Hedi Katz, who gave up performing to work with poor children. She persuaded the Henry Street Settlement to open a music school, where she was the director; she was later associated with the Chatham Square Music School.

== Plot ==
Youngster Frankie (Gene Reynolds) and his small gang commit petty crimes in their New York City tenement neighborhood, such as stealing bicycles and taking money from other boys. One of those boys, Willy (Tommy Kelly), complains to his father about this, who takes the matter to Frankie's mother (Marjorie Main) and stepfather (Arthur Hohl). Frankie finds an old violin in his basement which he used to play when his father was around. He then pawns it to get some money to put in the gang's treasury.

One day, Frankie and his friend "Limey" (Terry Kilburn) hide from the police in the lobby of a concert hall. When a couple has an argument, the man disgustedly throws away his tickets. Unable to scalp them, the boys decide to attend the concert. Frankie is entranced by the virtuoso performance of Jascha Heifetz. Later, he sees his violin in the window of a local pawn shop, and decides he wants it back. Frankie steals his little gang's stash of spare change to buy the violin, which he handles with aplomb back in his mother's kitchen. His stepfather comes home and believes Frankie stole it, smashes the instrument, and decides to pack him off to reform school. Frankie immediately runs away, putting his shoe shine gear into the empty violin case as his only possession.

He stumbles upon a music school for the poor, founded by Professor Lawson (Walter Brennan). Lawson discovers that Frankie has perfect pitch and instantly enrolls the boy. That night, Frankie sneaks into the basement to sleep, but Lawson finds him. After hearing his story, he lets Frankie stay.

Unbeknownst to Lawson, the school (which does not require tuition fees) is in financial trouble. The school's sponsor has died, and bills have gone unpaid for months. All of the musical instruments are rented from a stingy music store owner ironically named Mr. Flower (Porter Hall). Flower assigns one of his clerks, Peter (Joel McCrea), to collect payment, but Peter's girlfriend is Lawson's daughter, Ann (Andrea Leeds), so he does nothing. When Flower finds out, he fires Peter and goes to confront Ann.

Frankie overhears Peter and Ann discussing the situation, and organizes a street band with some of the other students to raise money. They set up right next to a concert hall where, according to clever Frankie, "people will like us." When Jascha Heifetz comes out of the hall, Frankie recognizes him and tells him about the school and the fund raising concert they have scheduled. Heifetz is impressed with Frankie and the story and offers to send a film of himself playing. Later, when Flower and the other creditors show up to collect payment, they get the mistaken impression that Heifetz is the school's new sponsor. Peter plays along to buy time, and even claims that the violinist will perform at the school's upcoming concert.

Suspicious, Flower goes to see Heifetz and discovers the truth. Limey and the rest of Frankie's old gang try to persuade Heifetz to come, but they are turned away without seeing him. Limey steals Heifetz's Stradivarius violin as a present for Frankie, unaware of its great value. When Frankie tries to return it, he is detained by the police but refuses to talk to anyone but Heifetz. When Heifetz shows up at the police station to collect his instrument, Frankie is able to persuade him to perform at the concert. Heifetz plays to Flower and a rapt audience of the parents of the children, and it appears that the school will now be sponsored by Heifetz.

== Cast ==
- Jascha Heifetz as himself
- Joel McCrea as Peter McCarthy
- Andrea Leeds as Ann Lawson
- Gene Reynolds as Frankie
- Walter Brennan as Professor Lawson
- Terry Kilburn as Limey
- Porter Hall as Mr. Flower
- Walter Tetley as Rocks Mulligan
- Chuck Stubbs as Fever Jones
- Tommy Kelly as Willie
- Gale Sherwood as Betty (as Jacqueline Nash)
- Alfred Newman as Musical Director
- Mary Ruth as Suzie
- John St. Polis as Davis
- Alexander Schoenberg as Menken (as Alexander Schonberg)
- Marjorie Main as Mrs. Miller
- Arthur Hohl as Mr. Miller
- Paul Harvey as Heifetz's Manager
- Emory Parnell as Policeman in Rain

== Marketing ==
An advertisement for the film was placed across the page from the film review in the NY Times quoted below. The poster shown above appears under the headline "Music... Love... Deep Emotion Surging Into Your Heart!" Additional text above the dual portrait of Andrea Leeds and Joel McCrea reads:

You'll be taken heart-deep into a stirring romance and reach right into the lives of snub-nosed, freckle-faced youngers more real than the kids on your own block! A mighty HUMAN DRAMA, surging with the immortal music of Jascha Heifetz, brough to you by Samuel Goldwyn!

== Music ==
Aside from orchestral (the William Tell Overture), piano, and vocal performances by the students, Heifetz performs the "Rondo Capriccioso" by Camille Saint-Saëns, the finale of the Mendelssohn Violin Concerto, the "Melodie" by Tchaikovsky, and a pair of solo violin pieces by other composers, arranged by Heifetz.

== Reception ==
An anonymous reviewer in The New York Times noted "a quality and abundance of magnificent fiddling as has never before been heard from a screen." They commented on

the crystal purity of Mr. Heifetz's playing, the eloquent flow of melody from his violin and the dramatic presentation of the artist commanding his instrument—closeups of his graceful fingers upon the strings, of his bowing arm and the brilliant angle-shots of the man befoe an orchestra—create an effect of transcendent beauty which is close to unique in this medium... [The story] is sufficient to support the ethereal grace of the music and little more. It is a sentimental tale... a tear-jerker.

The following Sunday, in the newspaper's arts and entertainment section, the music critic Olin Downes opined that "no one will dispute the unanimous verdict of the moving-picture critics of this city that the story of Jascha Heifetz's film "They Shall Have Music is a poor one." He referred to "Mr. Heifetz's glorious performance" and approved

the fact that the musician is no longer the accessory but the mainspring of the plot, and that music itself, principally in the person of Mr. Heifetz, but also present in various other human manifestations, is the hero of the drama... [By] the complete absence of acting, Mr. Heifetz is the more himself, the while that he pours forth, without stint or limit, his emotion and his genius in his musical performance. His playing is not masked, and it must be ranked among his greatest achievements.

Downes concluded his column by predicting, "For time to come audiences, as they do today at the Rivoli, will crash into applause after he finishes on the film, just as they do when he is present in the flesh at Carnegie Hall."
