= Elida Morris =

American singer

- Also known as: Elida Morris Cooper
- Born: Elida Mary Morris; November 12, 1886; Philadelphia, Pennsylvania, United States
- Died: December 25, 1977 (aged 91) Santa Barbara, California, United States
- Genres: Popular music, vaudeville
- Occupations: Singer, comedian, actress
- Years active: c. 1905–23
- Labels: Victor, Columbia

Elida Mary Morris (November 12, 1886 – December 25, 1977), later Elida Morris Cooper, was an American vaudeville singer, comedian and actress.

She was born in Philadelphia, Pennsylvania. She started her career in minstrel shows, and first recorded for Victor Records in 1910. A soprano, she also recorded for Columbia. Her successful solo recordings included "Kiss Me, My Honey, Kiss Me" (1910) and "If I Had Someone at Home Like You" (1914). One of her successes in 1910 was "Stop, Stop, Stop (Come Over and Love Me Some More)", written by Irving Berlin, which she sang with "considerable rhythmic and melodic freedom... speaking the key words "Stop, stop, stop" in an obviously provocative way".

She sang in the new "syncopated" style, and was sometimes described as a "coon shouter". In a 1912 Victor catalog, she was described as "The Girl Who Chases Away All Gloom". She recorded "Play Me a Good Old-Fashioned Melody" in 1912; the sheet music cover showed her as a male impersonator, but it is unclear whether this was a regular part of her vaudeville performances. She also recorded in duos with Billy Murray ("Angel Eyes", 1910), Walter Van Brunt ("I've Got Your Number", 1911), and Sam Ash ("Hello, Frisco!", from Ziegfeld Follies of 1915).

She appeared in The Passing Show of 1916, a novelty vaudeville show starring Ed Wynn. The programme notes report her as saying: "I would love a husband... if I could find one that suited. I would just love to be the boss, you understand, if I launched into matrimony, because it is the age of equal rights and I just love the suffrage idea." She also sang in opera. She made at least four trips to perform in England between 1912 and 1920, and also performed in France and South Africa.

In 1923 she married Norwood R. Cooper, and retired from the stage. She became one of the founder members of the Women's Aeronautical Association, an organisation to which Amelia Earhart also belonged. In 1932 she launched a vocal training studio in Van Nuys, Los Angeles, and in World War II she became Director of Volunteer Camp Shows, booking stars to entertain US troops. She was reportedly still active in her church choir in 1973.

She died in Santa Barbara, California in 1977 at the age of 91.
