= The Great Commandment =

1939 film by Irving Pichel

- Directed by: Irving Pichel
- Written by: Dana Burnet
- Produced by: John T. Coyle
- Starring: John Beal; Irving Pichel; Albert Dekker; Warren McCollum
- Cinematography: Charles P. Boyle, A.S.C.
- Edited by: Ralph Dixon
- Distributed by: Cathedral Films, Inc.
- Release dates: 1939 (by Cathedral Films); June 13, 1941 (by 20th Century Fox)
- Running time: 78 min
- Country: United States
- Language: English

The Great Commandment is a 1939 American Christian film directed by Irving Pichel, which portrays the conversion to Christianity of a young Zealot, Joel, and the Roman soldier Longinus through the teachings of Jesus in his Parable of the Good Samaritan. It was co-produced by Rev. James K. Friedrich and released by Cathedral Films in 1939. Its theatrical release was in 1941 by Twentieth Century Fox.

== Plot ==
The full film

The film takes place in 30 A.D. Judea in a fictional village near Jerusalem. The protagonist is Joel, the elder son of the village rabbi Lamech. Lamech wants Joel to follow in his footsteps as a scribe and rabbi, but Joel is secretly a zealot leader, believing that more must be done to help his nation than studying the Scriptures. He is also secretly in love with Tamar, the daughter of the carpet merchant Jemuel, and he overhears his father and Jemuel arranging a marriage between Tamar and one of Lamech's sons. Unfortunately for Joel it turns out to be his younger brother Zadok, an impetuous zealot, whom Joel has to protect from his own recklessness. A crisis is brought about by the arrival of a troop of soldiers led by a centurion, Longinus, who issues the demand for a special tax to be collected by a tax collector traveling with them. Zadok and other zealots organize the release of prisoners taken by the soldiers, which moves Longinus to plan a massacre of the men of the village. Zadok wants to attack the Romans right away, but Joel feels that a larger resistance is needed through someone reputed to be the coming Messiah of the Jewish people, Jesus Christ. Joel runs afoul of his father in declaring his love for Tamar, whom his father wants wedded to Zadok, and in revealing that he is a zealot leader.

With the sword of the zealots entrusted to him, Joel goes out to find Jesus in order to enlist His leadership of their cause. [Jesus is not presented directly in this film, but only as a reflection in water, as the glow of light on His listeners, and by way of the voice of Irving Pichel, the director.] Joel meets Jesus' disciples, Andrew and Judas Iscariot, who have two different ideas about Jesus' mission. Judas, like the zealots, thinks that Jesus should be a military and political leader who would lead his people against the Romans. Joel confronts Jesus with the sword of the zealots, and Jesus declines his invitation with the words of Matthew 26:52 "all who take up the sword will perish by the sword."

Joel disappointedly returns to his village just in time for the wedding feast of his brother Zadok and his beloved Tamar. He comes up with the idea that he and the zealots would kidnap Jesus and force His hand to support them. This is forestalled by Jesus' appearance at the village gate where Joel's father is presented as the scribe who asks Jesus, "What is the greatest commandment in the Law? (Luke 10:25-37). Jesus replies with His Parable of the Good Samaritan. Jesus' exhortation at the end to, "Go and do thou likewise", moves Joel to abandon his plan to kidnap Jesus.

Zadok is told by Nathan the innkeeper that Longinus is vulnerably asleep at his inn, and he gives up going to his bridal bed in order to kill Longinus. Nathan calls Joel and Lamech to the inn because Longinus repulsed Zadok's attack by killing him. The effect of Jesus' words on Joel moves him to keep from killing the unconscious Longinus and standing as a buffer between him and the men of the village, who are thirsting for his blood. When they ask Joel why he is protecting Longinus, he replies that he too is his brother.

Longinus sends word for his soldiers to meet him at the inn, and he has the soldiers arrest Joel and take him to prison in Jerusalem. In prison Joel misses the Passion of Jesus. Tamar is allowed to visit him. They are met by Longinus, who tells Joel that he had him arrested for his own protection from the village mob. He tells him of another wonder: he was a witness of Jesus' crucifixion, and he was the soldier who thrust the spear in His side to make sure He was dead. Longinus throws down the spear, and he, Joel, and Tamar return to the village to witness their Christian faith.

== Cast ==
- John Beal as Joel
- Irving Pichel providing the voice of Jesus
- Maurice Moscovitch as Rabbi Lamech, Joel's father
- Albert Dekker as Longinus
- Marjorie Cooley as Tamar
- Warren McCollum as Zadok, Joel's brother
- Lloyd Corrigan as Jemuel
- Olaf Hytten as Nathan
- Ian Wolfe as tax collector
- Anthony Marlowe as wedding singer
- Lester Scharff as first zealot
- Marc Lobell as Judas Iscariot
- Harold Minjir as Andrew
- Earl Gunn as wounded man
- Albert Spehr as second zealot
- George Rosener as a merchant
- John Merton as Roman officer under Longinus
- Perry Ivins as first elder
- D'Arcy Corrigan as the blind man
- Max Davidson as the old man
- Stanley Price as second elder
- Belle Mitchell as Jemuel's wife
