= The Bronze Bride =

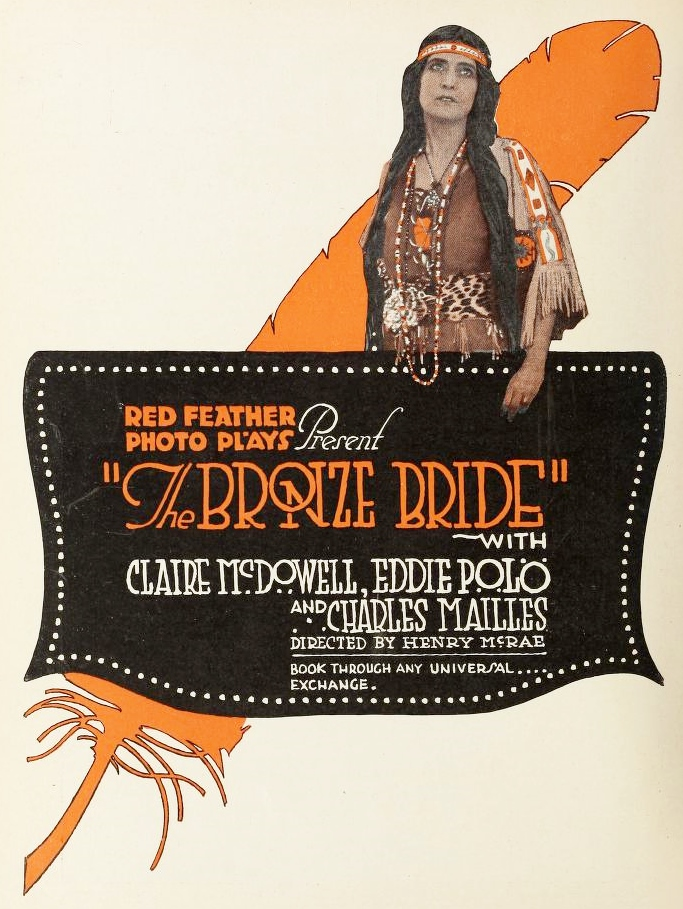
- Advertisementg
- Directed by: Henry MacRae
- Written by: Maud Grange; W.B. Pearson
- Story by: J.R. Burkey
- Starring: Claire McDowell; Frank Mayo; Edward Clark
- Production company: Universal Film Manufacturing Company
- Distributed by: Universal Film Manufacturing Company
- Release date: April 2, 1917
- Running time: 50 minutes
- Country: United States
- Languages: Silent; English intertitles

The Bronze Bride is a 1917 American silent drama film directed by Henry MacRae, and starring Claire McDowell, Frank Mayo, and Edward Clark.

== Cast ==
- Claire McDowell as A-Che-Chee
- Frank Mayo as Harvey Ogden
- Edward Clark as William Ogden
- Charles Hill Mailes as Joe Dubois
- Eddie Polo as White Feather
- Harry Archer as Black Lynx
- Winter Hall as Mr. Carter
- Betty Schade as His Daughter
- Frankie Lee as A-Che-Chee's Child

== Bibliography ==
- Ingraham, Chrys. White Weddings: Romancing Heterosexuality in Popular Culture. Routledge, 2009.
