= The Clutching Hand =

- Directed by: Albert Herman
- Written by: Arthur B. Reeve (novel); George M. Merrick (adaptation); Eddie Granemann (adaptation)
- Screenplay by: Leon D'Usseau; Dallas M. Fitzgerald
- Produced by: Louis Weiss
- Cinematography: James Diamond
- Edited by: Earl Turner
- Music by: Bernard B. Brown; Lee Zahler
- Production company: Weiss Productions
- Release date: 1936
- Running time: 305 minutes (15 episodes)
- Country: United States
- Language: English

The Clutching Hand, Chapter 1: Who Is the Clutching Hand?

The Clutching Hand (in full, The Amazing Exploits of the Clutching Hand) is a 15-episode serial produced by the Weiss Brothers in 1936, based on the final 1934 Craig Kennedy novel of the same name by Arthur B. Reeve. A 70-minute feature film using a condensed version of the serial was also released in the same year.

In it, the famous detective (portrayed by Jack Mulhall, who had portrayed the Black Ace in the serial The Mystery Squadron three years before) is assigned to solve the disappearance of Dr. Paul Gironda (Robert Frazer), a scientist who has developed a formula for synthesizing gold but vanishes before he has a chance to reveal it to his board of directors.

The Clutching Hand was the last Craig Kennedy serial and the only one to be filmed as a talkie. One of the criminals, Hobart, is played by Charles Locher, who is better known nowadays as Jon Hall, and it appears that Gironda is being held prisoner by Craig Kennedy's old foe, the Clutching Hand (a faceless presence apparently played by Bud Geary, an actor who was frequently cast in such roles, and voiced by Robert Frazer).

== Plot ==
The serial was based very loosely on Arthur Reeve's final novel and in it, the Clutching Hand has a new secret identity: Dr. Paul Gironda, the very man whom Kennedy is looking for. Having almost exhausted the estate of his young ward Vera, he has come up with the idea of using a fake synthetic gold formula to recoup his losses on the stock market, but just before he disappears, one of his assistants steals the notebook containing the formula. Unable to find it, he fakes his disappearance and goes into hiding, assuming the identity of Craig Kennedy's foe, the Clutching Hand, who was seemingly disposed of in The Exploits of Elaine years before. (The Clutching Hand had a totally different identity in that serial.) Supposedly holding Gironda captive in an induced coma, the Hand demands the missing pages of the gold formula from his wife and "daughter." At the same time as Gironda vanishes, Mitchell -–Vera's real father and Mrs. Gironda's first husband – is released from prison after serving a full sentence on a blackmail charge, forcing the Hand to try to dispose of Mitchell before Vera can learn of her true identity.

== Cast ==
- Jack Mulhall as Craig Kennedy
- Ruth Mix as Shirley McMillan
- Rex Lease as Walter Jameson
- Marion Shilling as Verna Gironda
- Mae Busch as Mrs. Gironda
- Gaston Glass as Dr. Louis Bouchard
- Bryant Washburn as Dr. Denton
- Franklyn Farnum as Lab Tech Nicky
- William Farnum as Insp. Gordon Gaunt
- Robert Walker as Joe Mitchell
- Charles Locher as Frank Hobart
- Reed Howes as Sullivan, private eye
- Frank Leigh as Wickham the butler
- George Morrell as Jenkins the butler
- Yakima Canutt as "Number 8"
- Bob Kortman as "Number 6"
- Ray Cardona as "Number 2"
- Joseph W. Girard as Attorney Cromwell
- Knute Erikson as Capt. Hansen
- Richard Alexander as Mate Olaf
- Robert Frazer as Dr. Paul Gironda

== Chapter listing ==
This is a partial list of chapters:

- Chapter 1 - Who Is The Clutching Hand?
- Chapter 2 - Shadow
- Chapter 3 - House of Mystery
- Chapter 4 - The Phantom Car
- Chapter 5 - The Double Trap
- Chapter 6 - Steps of Doom
- Chapter 7 - The Invisible Enemy
- Chapter 8 - A Cry in the Night
- Chapter 9 - Evil Eyes
- Chapter 10 - A Desperate Chance
- Chapter 11 - The Ship of Doom
- Chapter 12 - Hidden Danger
- Chapter 13 - The Mystic Menace
- Chapter 14 - The Silent Spectre
- Chapter 15 - The Lone Hand

Chapter Thirteen is titled "The Mystic Menace," and yet nothing mystical happens – it is a pretty standard serial chapter. However, the serial makers – the Weiss Brothers, in this case – could not alter the chapter titles for some reason. This was apparently the brothers' final serial and their last Craig Kennedy adaptation, although in 1952 the Weiss Brothers produced a television show called Craig Kennedy, Criminologist.
