= Earthbound (1940 film) =

1940 film directed by Irving Pichel

- Theatrical release poster
- Directed by: Irving Pichel
- Written by: John Howard Lawson; Samuel G. Engel
- Based on: The Ghost's Story by Basil King
- Produced by: Sol M. Wurtzel
- Starring: Warner Baxter; Andrea Leeds; Lynn Bari; Lester Scharff
- Cinematography: Lucien Andriot
- Edited by: Louis Loeffler; Nick DeMaggio
- Music by: Alfred Newman
- Production company: 20th Century-Fox
- Distributed by: 20th Century-Fox
- Release date: June 7, 1940
- Running time: 67 minutes
- Country: United States
- Language: English

Earthbound is a 1940 American supernatural romantic fantasy film directed by Irving Pichel and starring Warner Baxter and Andrea Leeds. It is based on the short story The Ghost's Story by Basil King which previously adapted into the 1920 silent film of the same name. Critical reception to the film was generally negative.

== Plot ==
Nick and Ellen are on their second honeymoon, when a telegram arrives. Nick must return to town, expecting to meet with his best friend, Dr Jeffrey Reynolds. However, it is Reynolds’ wife, Linda, who has sent the telegram. It is then revealed that Nick and Linda had been having an affair, but Nick had ended it and was reconciled with his wife, Ellen. Linda was still desperate to reignite their passion, but Nick will have none of it.

Later, Nick is expecting to meet with Jeffrey, and Linda shows up instead. Nick insists again their affair is over, and with Jeffrey’s arrival, he ushers her into his study. He meets with Jeffrey and agrees to provide more funding for his research. Nick excuses himself to go to his study and write a cheque for Jeffrey. He sits at his desk writing the cheque when Linda confronts him with a drawn gun. He rises and attempts to reason with her, and to wrestle the weapon free. The weapon fires, Nick is shot and quickly dies. Immediately, the ghost of Nick appears bewildered by what has happened. Jeffrey races into the room, and seeing Linda there, realises she has murdered Nick. He attempts to get the gun to dispose of it, but accidentally drops it into the fireplace, where the gun falls through a grate. Rather than trying to retrieve it, he and Linda quickly leave the scene. All this time, the ghost of Nick attempts to talk to Jeffrey and Linda, but they cannot hear him or see him.

Nick attends his own funeral, and encounters Mr Whimser, who can in fact see and hear him. Nick remembers he met him previously on the train back to town. There is a realisation that he has some religious significance, perhaps he is an angel, or someone involved in death.

Jeffrey is arrested for the murder of Nick, and to avoid further cross-examination that may reveal Linda as the murderer, he professes his guilt. Nick is frustrated and annoyed that he cannot do anything to help his friend, so with encouragement from Mr Whimser, begins to follow Ellen about. He realises that Ellen is suspicious of Linda, as Jeffrey was very unlikely to have killed Nick. Although she can’t hear him, he pleads with her to go back to his study to search for the gun. Through his insistence, desperation, she seems to get some inspiration, and does go to the study, where she finds the gun.

Ellen takes the gun to Linda, just catching her on the train, as she is attempting to leave the country. Ellen makes Linda reveal that Nick truly loved Ellen, and that Linda killed him because he did not love her. Nick is no longer earthbound, and may now rest in peace.

== Cast ==
- Warner Baxter as Nick Desborough
- Andrea Leeds as Ellen Desborough
- Lynn Bari as Linda Reynolds
- Charley Grapewin as Mr. Whimser
- Henry Wilcoxon as Dr. Jeffrey Reynolds
- Elizabeth Patterson as Becky Tilden
- Russell Hicks as Prosecutor
- Christian Rub as Etienne Almette
- Ian Wolfe as Amos Totten
- Lester Scharff as Detective
- Reginald Sheffield as Defense Attorney
- Pedro de Cordoba as Minister

== Production ==
Directed by Irving Pichel, Earthbound was proposed as a star vehicle for actor Warner Baxter, whose career was declining. It would be the final film he made for 20th Century Fox. Sol M. Wurtzel adapted Earthbound into a 67-minute film, while also slightly modifying the story.

John Howard Lawson and Samuel G. Engel wrote the screenplay for the film. Lawson proposed the film be set during World War I with "people going about customary tasks, wearing gas masks ... two lovers parting on a street corner, trying to say goodbye, unable to take off their masks." Darryl F. Zanuck rejected the idea.

== Reception ==
In a contemporary review in The New York Times, reviewer Bosley Crowther wrote that "we can only describe "Earthbound" as a solemn piece of foolishness so preposterous that it borders on farce." Several decades later, film historian Leonard Maltin gave Earthbound two stars out of four, calling it a "strange little fantasy" with "a deadly serious mixture of half-baked philosophy and heavy-handed special effects." TV Guide gave the film two and a half stars out of four, calling the film's idea "farfetched" but opining it was done well. AllMovie writer Bruce Eder's review graded the film two and a half stars out of five. Although he believed some of the plot elements were "incredulous" and the film's "sentimentality seems dated", he praised the film's acting, opining it was "above average" for a B movie, and wrote positively of Pichel's directing work. In the book American Silent Horror, Science Fiction and Fantasy Feature Films, 1913-1929, author John T. Soister compared the film to the original. He noted that while the original was lost, the 1940 version was still available. He commented that "it seems the wrong Earthbound has disappeared."
