= New York (1927 film) =

1927 film

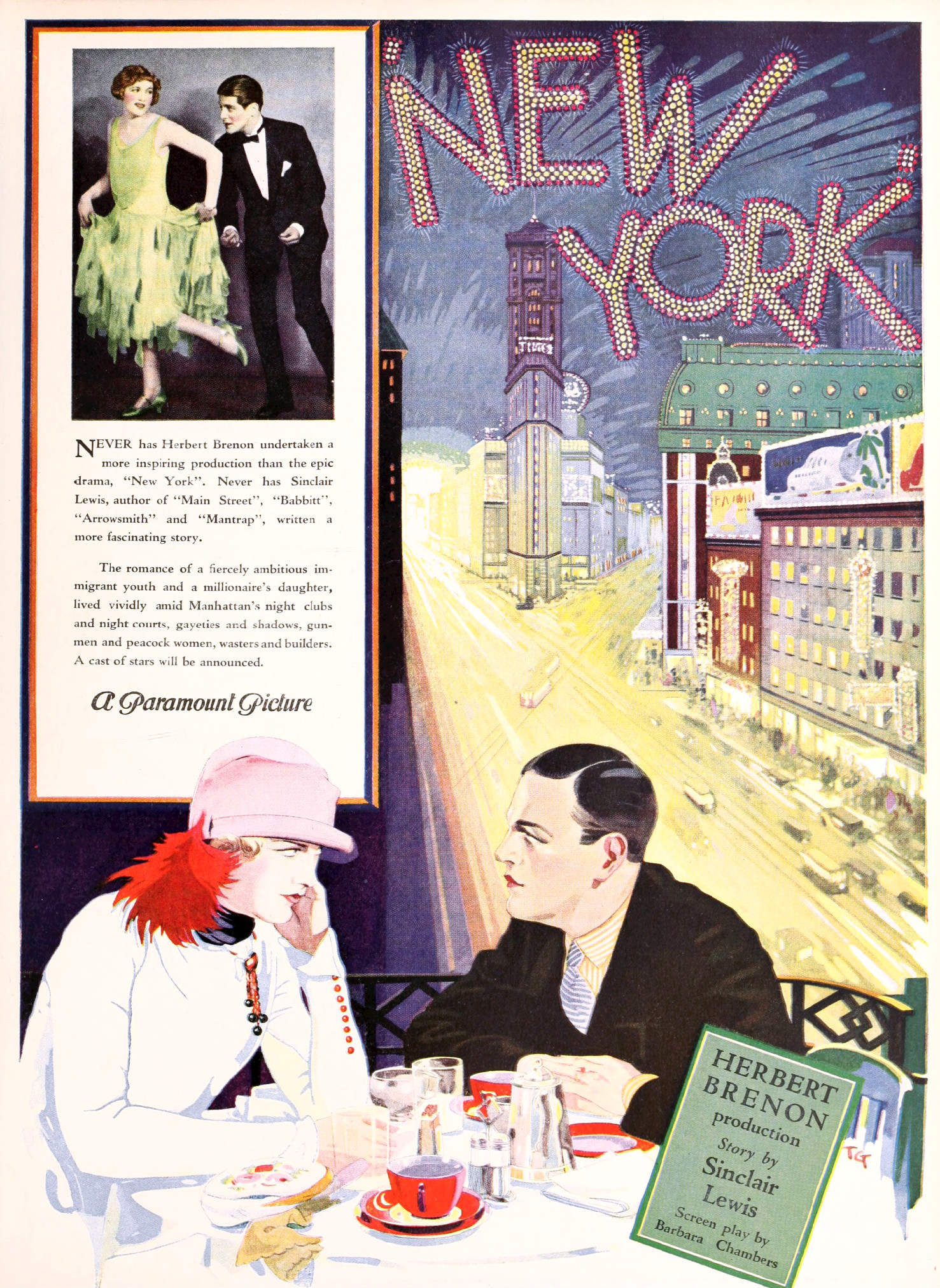
- Advertisement
- Directed by: Luther Reed
- Screenplay by: Barbara Chambers; Becky Gardiner; Forrest Halsey
- Produced by: William LeBaron; Jesse L. Lasky; Adolph Zukor
- Starring: Ricardo Cortez; Lois Wilson; Estelle Taylor; William Powell
- Cinematography: J. Roy Hunt
- Production company: Famous Players–Lasky Corporation
- Distributed by: Paramount Pictures
- Release date: January 30, 1927
- Running time: 70 minutes
- Country: United States
- Language: Silent (English intertitles)

New York is a 1927 American silent drama film directed by Luther Reed and written by Barbara Chambers, Becky Gardiner, and Forrest Halsey. The film stars Ricardo Cortez, Lois Wilson, Estelle Taylor, William Powell, Norman Trevor, and Richard "Skeets" Gallagher. The film was released on January 30, 1927, by Paramount Pictures. It is considered a lost film.

== Plot ==
Bowery musician becomes engaged to society heiress and is visited by old sweetheart whose jealous husband kills her. Musician is tried and found guilty of murder but eventually the truth comes out and he marries the heiress.

== Cast ==
- Ricardo Cortez as Michael Angelo Cassidy
- Lois Wilson as Marjorie Church
- Estelle Taylor as Angie Miller
- William Powell as Trent Regan
- Norman Trevor as Randolph Church
- Richard "Skeets" Gallagher as Buck
- Margaret Quimby as Helen Matthews
- Lester Scharff as Izzy Blumenstein
- Charles Byer as Jimmie Wharton

== Preservation ==
With no prints of New York located in any film archives, it is a lost film.
