= Edward Clark (actor) =

American actor (1878–1954)

- Born: May 6, 1878; Russia
- Died: November 18, 1954 (aged 76); Hollywood, California, US
- Years active: 1913–1954

Edward Clark (May 6, 1878 – November 18, 1954) was a Russian-born American actor whose career began in the silent era. He was also a playwright, theatre director and songwriter. Among his songs was the original 1899 barbershop quartet song Heart of My Heart. He was born in Russia and died in Hollywood, California from a heart attack.

== Works ==
=== Selected filmography ===
- Graft (1915, Serial) – Grant Fisher
- The Iron Hand (1916) – Jerry Simpson
- The Bronze Bride (1917) – William Ogden
- Eternal Love (1917) – François Gautier
- The Kaiser, the Beast of Berlin (1918) – Gen. Erich von Falkenhagen
- Millionaires (1926)
- Broken Hearts of Hollywood (1926, scenario)
- Sally in Our Alley (1927, scenario)
- Finger Prints (1927, scenario)
- Hills of Kentucky (1927, scenario)
- Marriage by Contract (1928)
- Unmasked (1929, scenario)
- King Kong (1933) – Member of Ship's Crew (uncredited)
- One Hour Late (1934) – Mr. Meller
- Swamp Water (1941) – Townsman (uncredited)
- Ball of Fire (1941) – Motor Court Proprietor (uncredited)
- Roxie Hart (1942) – Idler (uncredited)
- The Male Animal (1942) – Newsdealer (uncredited)
- Mrs. Wiggs of the Cabbage Patch (1942) – Cabbage Patch Character (uncredited)
- Hello, Frisco, Hello (1943) – Sam, the Stage Doorman (uncredited)
- The Good Fellows (1943) – Cutler (uncredited)
- Phantom of the Opera (1943) – Usher (uncredited)
- Sweet Rosie O'Grady (1943) – Minor Role (uncredited)
- The Song of Bernadette (1943) – Hospital Attendant (uncredited)
- The Falcon Out West (1944) – Coroner (uncredited)
- Jungle Woman (1944) – Inquest Juror (uncredited)
- Heavenly Days (1944) – Sam, the Gallup Clerk (uncredited)
- Experiment Perilous (1944) – Train Steward (uncredited)
- Where Do We Go from Here? (1945) – Organist (uncredited)
- The Falcon's Alibi (1946) – Coroner (uncredited)
- O.S.S. (1946) – French Waiter (uncredited)
- Nocturne (1946) – Apartment House Clerk (uncredited)
- It's a Wonderful Life (1946) – Building & Loan Board Member (uncredited)
- The Fabulous Dorseys (1947) – Hotel Clerk (uncredited)
- Love and Learn (1947) - Justice of the Peace (uncredited)
- Welcome Stranger (1947) – Andy Weaver (uncredited)
- I Wonder Who's Kissing Her Now (1947) – Dad - Stage Doorman (uncredited)
- Heaven Only Knows (1947) – Storekeeper Townsman (uncredited)
- Nightmare Alley (1947) – J.E. Giles - Farmer (uncredited)
- My Wild Irish Rose (1947) – Jeremiah Mahoney - Justice of the Peace (uncredited)
- The Senator Was Indiscreet (1947) – Eddie
- If You Knew Susie (1948) – Band Leader (uncredited)
- My Girl Tisa (1948) – Bit Role (uncredited)
- April Showers (1948) – Pop - Stagedoor Man (uncredited)
- Give My Regards to Broadway (1948) – Western Union Boy (uncredited)
- The Walls of Jericho (1948) – Barber (uncredited)
- When My Baby Smiles at Me (1948) – Box-Office Clerk (uncredited)
- The Accused (1949) – Professor (uncredited)
- Amazon Quest (1949) – Nicholas Handel
- Illegal Entry (1949) – News Shop Proprietor (uncredited)
- Look for the Silver Lining (1949) – Wilkins (uncredited)
- The Great Gatsby (1949) – One of Gatsby's Servants (uncredited)
- It's a Great Feeling (1949) – Minister (uncredited)
- Abandoned (1949) – Clerk in Coroner's Office (uncredited)
- Oh, You Beautiful Doll (1949) – Cooper - Desk Clerk (uncredited)
- Free for All (1949) – Doctor (uncredited)
- Undertow (1949) – Drugstore Clerk (uncredited)
- Dancing in the Dark (1949) – Mr. Wallberg (uncredited)
- Key to the City (1950) – Elderly Passerby (uncredited)
- House by the River (1950) – Minor Role (uncredited)
- A Ticket to Tomahawk (1950) – Jet (uncredited)
- Rock Island Trail (1950) – Old Man (uncredited)
- Trial Without Jury (1950) – Eddie (uncredited)
- The Petty Girl (1950) – Prof. Ramsey (uncredited)
- Pretty Baby (1950) – Radio Actor (uncredited)
- The Milkman (1950) – Old Man (uncredited)
- Two Weeks with Love (1950) – Druggist (uncredited)
- Branded (1950) – Dad Travis
- Gambling House (1950) – Pop (uncredited)
- Sierra Passage (1950) – Old Man with Pumpkin (uncredited)
- Stage to Tucson (1950) – Denver Hotel Clerk (uncredited)
- Grounds for Marriage (1951) – Mr. Parmel (uncredited)
- Three Guys Named Mike (1951) – Old Man at Rooming House (uncredited)
- Bedtime for Bonzo (1951) – Professor Fosdick
- Danger Zone (1951) – Elderly Man at Auction (1st Episode)
- The Fat Man (1951) – Pop (uncredited)
- Ma and Pa Kettle Back on the Farm (1951) – Dr. Bagley (uncredited)
- Million Dollar Pursuit (1951) – Holcomb
- Dear Brat (1951) – Dr. Edwards (uncredited)
- Savage Drums (1951) – Tabuana, older chief on council
- Strangers on a Train (1951) – Miriam's Boss (uncredited)
- Never Trust a Gambler (1951) – Dr. Gray (uncredited)
- Mr. Belvedere Rings the Bell (1951) – Mailman (uncredited)
- Rhubarb (1951) – Judge Loudermilk (uncredited)
- Little Egypt (1951) – Judge
- Cattle Queen (1951) – Doc Hodges
- Finders Keepers (1952) – Gramps (uncredited)
- Invitation (1952) – Postman (uncredited)
- Shadow in the Sky (1952) – Larkin (uncredited)
- Here Come the Nelsons (1952) – Herb (uncredited)
- Thundering Caravans (1952) – Printer Tom
- Carrie (1952) – Tom – Ticket Agent (uncredited)
- She's Working Her Way Through College (1952) – Stage Doorman (uncredited)
- You for Me (1952) – Judge (uncredited)
- Park Row (1952) – Saloon Patron (uncredited)
- Just for You (1952) – Sam – Stage Doorman (uncredited)
- The Happy Time (1952) – Dr. Marchaud
- Million Dollar Mermaid (1952) – Manin Train Compartment (uncredited)
- The Blue Gardenia (1953) – News Stand Dealer (uncredited)
- I Love Melvin (1953) – Meek Man (uncredited)
- It Happens Every Thursday (1953) – Homer
- The Beast from 20,000 Fathoms (1953) – Lighthouse Keeper (uncredited)
- Houdini (1953) – Doorman (uncredited)
- Flame of Calcutta (1953) – Pandit Bandar
- Bandits of the West (1953) – John Anders (uncredited)
- Topeka (1953) – Banker Corley
- Champ for a Day (1953) – Cashier (uncredited)
- El Paso Stampede (1953) – Josh Bailey
- The Moonlighter (1953) – Telegrapher (uncredited)
- Easy to Love (1953) – Gardener (uncredited)
- Money from Home (1953) – Dr. Walter Capulet (uncredited)
- Three Hours to Kill (1954) – Ernest (uncredited)
- Cry Vengeance (1954) – Shop Owner (uncredited)
- Hell's Outpost (1954) – Belden (uncredited)
- Crashout (1955) – Conductor
- East of Eden (1955) – Draft Board Member (uncredited)

=== Musicals ===
- Oh, What A Girl! (book and lyrics)
- Paradise Alley (book)
- Cinders (book and lyrics) Music by Rudolf Friml
- Furs and Frills (book and lyrics)
- Honey Girl (book)
- You're in Love (book and lyrics)
- Little Miss Charity (lyrics)

=== Plays ===
- Coat Tails
- Not with My Money
- De Luxe Annie was a starring vehicle for Emélie Polini in Australia and US, and was filmed in 1918, starring Norma Talmadge.
