= Milton Krims =

American screenwriter (1904–1988)

- Born: 1904
- Died: July 11, 1988 (aged 83–84)
- Occupations: Screenwriter; journalist; short-story writer; novelist
- Years active: 1929–1963
- Spouse(s): Jayne Meadows (m. 1949; div. 1954) Shirley O'Hara (m. 1959–1988; his death)
- Children: 1

Milton Krims (1904 – July 11, 1988) was an American screenwriter, journalist, short-story writer, and novelist.

Early in his career, Krims was a journalist with magazines in addition to writing novels and short stories. He became involved with films when Paramount bought the rights to one of his novels in the early 1930s and he went to that studio to work as a screenwriter. Krims's first film scenario was for The Life of Stephen Foster. He went to work for Warner Bros. in the mid-1930s. While he was at Warner Bros., his contract allowed him to take leave to write for Collier's magazine, and in that way he reported on the Spanish Civil War, the conference at Munich, and the Battle of Britain.

Krims was a member of the Army Air Forces during World War II.

After writing and consulting on Perry Mason, Krims' first project as a TV producer was Hotel de Paree in 1959. He returned to working for magazines in the 1970s, when he was film editor for Holiday and The Saturday Evening Post.

== Personal life ==
Krims was first married to actress Jayne Meadows. In the late 1950s he married actress Shirley O'Hara.

On July 11, 1988, Krims died of pneumonia at the Motion Picture Country Home and Hospital in Woodland Hills, California, at age 84. He was survived by his wife Shirley, a daughter, a stepson, and two grandchildren.

== Awards ==
The Academia Mondiale Degli Artisti Proffessionisti in Italy awarded him an honorary doctor of literature degree.

== Select credits ==
- Unmasked (1929) as Prince Hamid
- The Western Code (1932)
- Forbidden Trail (1932)
- Green Light (1937)
- The Sisters (1938)
- Confessions of a Nazi Spy (1939)
- A Dispatch from Reuters (1940)
- The Iron Curtain (1948)
- Prince of Foxes (1949)
- Crossed Swords (1954)
- Tennessee's Partner (1955)
- Perry Mason, six episodes (1958–1959)
- Hotel de Paree series (1959–1960)
- The Executioner of Venice (1963)
- Keeper of the Purple Twilight, Outer Limits episode (1964)
- Counterweight, Outer Limits episode (1964)
