= Colony Palms Hotel =

- Location in California

General information
- Location: 572 N. Indian Canyon Dr. Palm Springs, California
- Coordinates: 33.8315°N 116.5450°W
- Opening: 1936
- Owner: Michael Rosenfeld (Woodridge Capital Partners)
- Operator: Colony Palms Hotel

Technical details
- Floor count: 2

Design and construction
- Architects: Martyn Lawrence-Bullard (2007 renovation)
- Developer: Al Wertheimer

Other information
- Number of rooms: 52
- Number of suites: 5
- Number of restaurants: 1

Website
- Colony Palms Hotel

The Colony Palms Hotel is located in Palm Springs, California. The hotel has 57 rooms and suites.

It re-opened after a 2007 renovation, and features the "Winner's Circle Suite" in honor of previous owners, Robert S. and Andrea Leeds Howard (owners of the racehorse Seabiscuit).

== History ==
The Colony Palms Hotel was originally built as the "Colonial House" by Las Vegas casino owner and Purple Gang member Al Wertheimer. The hotel began receiving guests in 1936, and had a reputed downstairs speakeasy and brothel. It was renamed "Howard Manor" in the late 1940s when Robert and Andrea Leeds Howard took possession. (Robert Howard was the son of Charles S. Howard.) Boxing champion Jack Dempsey was also an owner. For the next 25 years the hotel was a haven for young Hollywood in Palm Springs.

In the 1970s, it became a health spa called The Palms operated by Sheila Cluff (owner of The Oaks in Ojai, California).

The original hotel had a mural on the wall that was Botticelli-esque in nature, with some frolicking nudes. The new owner (Steve Ohren) preserved the original mural from 1935 when redesigning the resort with Martyn Lawrence-Bullard.
