= It Could Happen to You (1937 film) =

1937 film by Phil Rosen

- Theatrical release poster
- Directed by: Phil Rosen
- Screenplay by: Samuel Ornitz; Nathanael West
- Story by: Nathanael West
- Produced by: Leonard Fields
- Starring: Alan Baxter; Andrea Leeds; Owen Davis Jr. Astrid Allwyn; Walter Kingsford; Al Shean
- Cinematography: Jack A. Marta
- Edited by: Ernest J. Nims; Murray Seldeen
- Music by: Alberto Colombo
- Production company: Republic Pictures
- Distributed by: Republic Pictures
- Release date: June 28, 1937
- Running time: 71 minutes
- Country: United States
- Language: English

It Could Happen to You is a 1937 American drama film directed by Phil Rosen and written by Samuel Ornitz and Nathanael West. The film stars Alan Baxter, Andrea Leeds, Owen Davis Jr., Astrid Allwyn, Walter Kingsford and Al Shean. It was released on June 28, 1937 by Republic Pictures.

== Plot ==
Kindly Max Barrett, known to everyone as "Pa," is the proud owner of a candy store frequented by the other immigrants living in his New York East Side neighborhood.

Pa's son Fred, an aspiring lawyer, has been reared with Bob Ames, an orphan whom Pa took in as a child. Bob works in a bookie's office with his former girl friend Angela, but aspires to a better life. When Professor Schwab announces that he is retiring from running the Foreign American institute, at which immigrants can learn how to become good American citizens, Bob sees his chance.

In order to buy the school from Schwab, Bob attempts to pull a scam at the race track with Angela, but they are found out by their employer and dismissed. Desperate to obtain the money, Bob remembers the $600 showed to him by Pa, who has saved it to set up Fred in his own office. On the night of Fred's graduation from law school, Bob robs the candy store. Pa, who has forgotten his ticket to the commencement exercises, returns to the store and is killed by Bob, who does not recognize him until it is too late.

The crime goes unsolved, but Laura Compton, Bob and Fred's childhood friend, with whom they are both in love, tells the police that one of the stolen bills was torn and repaired with tape. Schwab recognizes the bill as one with which Bob paid for the institute, and blackmails him into taking him on as a partner. Schwab then forces Bob to turn the school into a racket that threatens neighborhood immigrants with deportation if they do not attend the school and pay the five dollars-a-week tuition.

The immigrants are furious with the deal, and Bob grows despondent over having to betray his lifelong friends. Tired of Angela, who is still in love with him, Bob tries to get Schwab to dismiss her, and she angrily tells the police the truth about Pa's murder.

Refusing to believe that his friend could be guilty, Fred defends him and convinces the jury that the most damning evidence, Bob's fingerprints on the cookie jar containing Pa's money, is a natural result of Bob having grown up with the Barretts. After he is acquitted, Bob orders Schwab to leave the country, telling him that because he has been acquitted once, he cannot be tried again and is therefore free of Schwab's power over him.

Schwab threatens to show the incriminating bill to Fred and Laura, and while the men argue, they are involved in a car accident, and Schwab is killed. Bob then goes to the institute, where he meets Fred and Laura.

As they are talking, the angry students, fed up with the racket, storm the school and threaten to lynch Fred and Bob. Hoping to save Fred, Bob climbs to the roof and confesses that he murdered Pa and engineered the racket. The mob still threatens Fred, despite Bob's pleas that his friend is innocent, and so to convince them, Bob jumps from the building.

Later, after Bob's funeral, Fred and Laura console each other with the knowledge that the school, now called the Max Barrett Institute, will be run legitimately.

== Cast ==
- Alan Baxter as Bob Ames
- Andrea Leeds as Laura Compton
- Owen Davis Jr. as Fred Barrett
- Astrid Allwyn as Angela
- Walter Kingsford as Prof. Schwab
- Al Shean as Max 'Pa' Barrett
- Christian Rub as Clavish
- Elsa Janssen as Mrs. Clavish
- Edward Colebrook as Pogano
- Stanley King as Detective
- Nina Campana as Italian Woman
- Frank Yaconelli as Greek
- John Hamilton as Judge
- Paul Stanton as District Attorney
- Bob Murphy as Moriarity
- Cy Kendall as Detective
- Robert Andersen as Swede
- Bert Sprotte as German
- Sada Simmons as Swedish Woman
- Hans Joby as Small German
