= Andrea Leeds =

American actress (1913–1984)

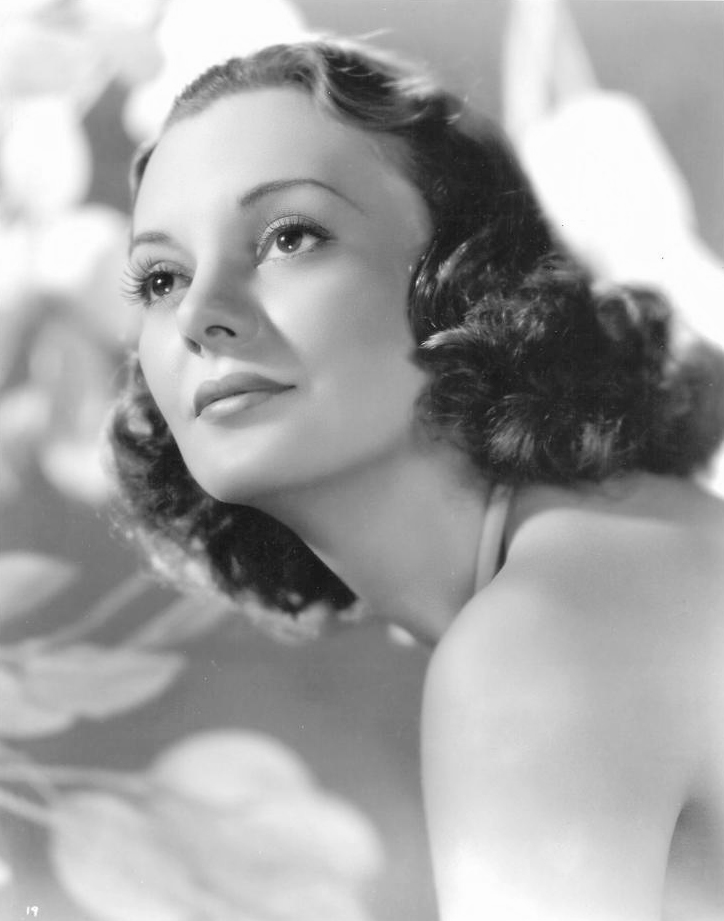
- Leeds in a publicity photo, 1930s
- Born: Antoinette Lees; August 18, 1913; Butte, Montana, U.S.
- Died: May 21, 1984 (aged 70); Riverside, California, U.S.
- Resting place: Desert Memorial Park Cathedral City, California
- Education: UCLA (BA)
- Occupation: Actress
- Years active: 1934–1940
- Spouse: Robert Stewart Howard (m. 1939; died 1962)
- Children: 2

Andrea Leeds (born Antoinette Lees, August 18, 1913 – May 21, 1984) was an American film actress. A popular supporting player of the late 1930s, Leeds was nominated for an Academy Award for Best Supporting Actress for her performance in Stage Door (1937). As she began progressing to more prominent roles, Leeds retired after marrying, and later became a successful horse breeder.

== Early life ==
Leeds was born on August 18, 1913, in Butte, Montana, the only child of Charles and Lina (née Deoviddio) Lees. Charles was a mining engineer; his mining interests led to Leeds living most of her younger life in Mexico. Initially planning to be a writer, Leeds earned a Bachelor of Arts degree from the University of California, Los Angeles.

== Career ==
Leeds began her film career in 1933, playing bit parts and using her given name Andrea Lees. Under the name Andrea Leeds, she played her first substantial role in the film Come and Get It (1936) and achieved another success with her next film It Could Happen to You (1937).

As part of an ensemble cast that included Katharine Hepburn, Ginger Rogers and Lucille Ball, Leeds was nominated for an Academy Award for Best Supporting Actress for her performance as an aspiring actress in Stage Door (1937). Her wholesome quality led to her being cast in The Goldwyn Follies (1938) playing Miss Humanity, a woman considered by a jaded Hollywood executive to represent the ideal American woman. However, the film was a critical and commercial failure. In 1938, Leeds also read for the role of and did screen tests for the role of Melanie in Gone with the Wind; however the role was given to Olivia de Havilland.

She next appeared in two films opposite Joel McCrea (who earlier played her brother in Come and Get It), Youth Takes a Fling (1938) and They Shall Have Music (1939), for the first time playing the lead female role. She continued to play the romantic female lead in an adventure film The Real Glory, opposite Gary Cooper and David Niven, and opposite Don Ameche in Swanee River (1939), the first Technicolor biography of Stephen Foster. Her final film Earthbound (1940) was a fantasy murder mystery in which her character is aided by the ghost of her late husband to solve his murder.

Although her films were successful and she remained a popular actress, Leeds retired in 1940 after marrying in 1939.

== Personal life ==
On October 25, 1939, Leeds married Robert Stewart Howard, son of California businessman and racehorse owner Charles S. Howard. Together, they had two children, Robert Jr. and Leann, who died of cancer in 1971.

The elder Howard owned and raced Seabiscuit, and with her husband, Leeds became a successful horse owner/breeder. The couple also owned the Howard Manor in Palm Springs, a hotel originally built as the Colonial House by Las Vegas casino owner and Purple Gang member Al Wertheimer. The hotel currently operates as the Colony Palms Hotel, and features the Winner's Circle Suite in honor of Seabiscuit and the Howards. After her husband's death in 1962, Leeds ran a jewelry business.

== Death ==
Leeds died from cancer at age 70 on May 21, 1984, in Riverside, California. She was interred in Desert Memorial Park in Cathedral City, California. In 1994, Leeds received a Golden Palm Star on the Palm Springs Walk of Stars.

== Filmography ==
Year	Title	Role	Notes
1933	Meet the Baron	College Girl	uncredited
1934	Elinor Norton	Nurse	uncredited
1934	Bachelor of Arts	Student Occupations Bureau Clerk	uncredited
1935	Asegure a su mujer		as Antoinette Lees
1935	Dante's Inferno	Anna	uncredited
1935	Anna Karenina	Girl in Bar	uncredited
1935	Life Hesitates at 40	Dr. Finlayson's Nurse	Short, uncredited
1935	Magnificent Obsession	Nina	uncredited
1936	The Bohemian Girl	Maid & Governess	uncredited
1936	The Count Takes the Count	Gloria Grayson	short, as Antoinette Lees
1936	Sutter's Gold	Nurse	uncredited
1936	Song of the Trail	Betty Hobson	as Antoinette Lees
1936	The Moon's Our Home	Perfume Salesgirl	as Antoinette Lees
1936	Forgotten Faces	Salesgirl	as Antoinette Lees
1936	My Man Godfrey	Socialite at Scavenger Hunt	uncredited
1936	Come and Get It	Evvie Glasgow	
1937	It Could Happen to You	Laura Compton	
1937	Stage Door	Kay Hamilton	Nominated – Academy Award for Best Supporting Actress
1938	The Goldwyn Follies	Hazel Dawes	
1938	Letter of Introduction	Katherine 'Kay' Martin	
1938	Youth Takes a Fling	Helen Brown	
1939	They Shall Have Music	Ann Lawson	
1939	The Real Glory	Linda Hartley	
1939	Swanee River	Jane McDowell Foster	
1940	Earthbound	Ellen Desborough	(final film role)
