= Craig Kennedy =

Fictional character created by Arthur B. Reeve

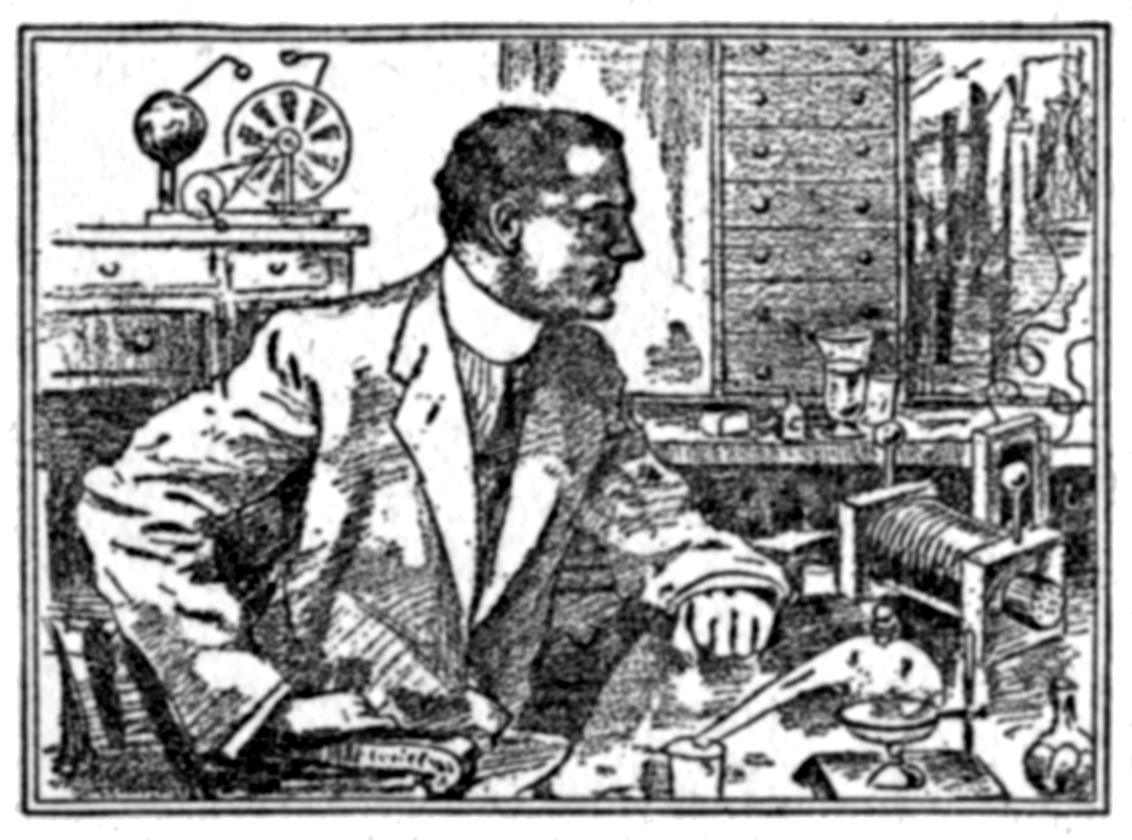
- First appearance: The Case of Helen Bond
- Last appearance: The Stars Scream Murder
- Created by: Arthur B. Reeve

In-universe information
- Gender: Male
- Nationality: American

Professor Craig Kennedy is a fictional detective created by Arthur B. Reeve.

== Description ==
Kennedy is a scientist detective at Columbia University similar to Sherlock Holmes and Dr. Thorndyke. He uses his knowledge of chemistry and psychoanalysis to solve cases, and uses exotic (at the time) devices in his work such as lie detectors, gyroscopes, and portable seismographs. Like Dr. Watson from the Holmes tales and Dr. Jervis from the Thorndyke stories, a companion to Kennedy, reporter Walter Jameson, narrates the stories.

== Publication ==
Kennedy first appeared in the December 1910 issue of Cosmopolitan, in "The Case of Helen Bond." He ultimately made 82 appearances in Cosmopolitan, the last coming in the August 1918 issue. Twelve stories were reprinted in the first collection, and this continued, but soon the stories were fixed up into a novel, and some were adaptations of movie serials.

He returned for many short stories in magazines as various as The Popular Magazine, Detective Story Magazine, Country Gentleman, Everybody's Magazine, and Flynn's, as well as in 26 novels. Through the 1920s, he became more of a typical detective. Craig Kennedy appeared in a number of 1930s pulp magazines, Complete Detective Novel Magazine, Dime Detective, Popular Detective, Weird Tales, and World Man Hunters, but many of these appear to be ghost-written as they lack the style and flavor of the teen-era Craig Kennedy stories. A series of six Craig Kennedy stories in early issues of Popular Detective are known to have been unsold novelettes rewritten by A. T. Locke.

== Books ==
1. The Silent Bullet (1910)
2. The Poisoned Pen (1911)
3. Constance Dunlap (1913)
4. The Dream Doctor (1914)
5. Guy Garrick (1914)
6. The Death House (1914)
7. The War Terror (1915)
8. The Gold of the Gods (1915)
9. The Exploits of Elaine (1915) adaption of movie serial
10. The Social Gangster (1916)
11. The Ear in the Wall (1916)
12. The Romance of Elaine (1916) adaption of movie serial
13. The Triumph of Elaine (1916)
14. The Treasure Train (1917)
15. The Adventuress (1917)
16. The Panama Plot (1918)
17. The Soul Scar (1919)
18. The Film Mystery (1921) adaption of Houdini movie serial
19. The Bacteriological Detective (1922)
20. Craig Kennedy Listens In (1923)
21. Atavar, the Dream Dancer (1924)
22. The Fourteen Points (1925)
23. The Boy Scouts' Craig Kennedy (1925)
24. Craig Kennedy on the Farm (1925)
25. The Radio Detective (1926)
26. Pandora (1926)
27. The Kidnap Club (1932)
28. The Clutching Hand (1934)
29. Enter Craig Kennedy (1935)
30. The Stars Scream Murder (1936)

== Stories ==
1. The Case of Helen Bond (The Silent Cracksman) Dec 1910
2. The Silent Bullet Jan 1911
3. The Bacteriological Detective Feb 1911
4. The Story of The Deadly Tube Mar 1911
5. The Seismograph Adventure Apr 1911
6. The Diamond Maker May 1911
7. The Azure Ring Jun 1911
8. A Spontaneous Combustion Jul 1911
9. The Terror in the Air Aug 1911
10. The Black Hand Sep 1911
11. The Artificial Paradise (The Man Who Was Dead) Oct 1911
12. The Steel Door Nov 1911
13. The Sand-Hog (The Tunnel Mystery) Dec 1911
14. The Bacillus of Death Jan 1912
15. The Master Counterfeiter Feb 1912
16. The Firebug (The Firefiend) Mar 1912
17. The Yeggman Apr 1912
18. The Green-Goods King May 1912
19. The Poisoned Pen May 1912
20. The White Slave Jun 1912
21. The Treasure Vault Jul 1912
22. The Forger Jul 1912
23. The Unofficial Spy Aug 1912
24. The Smuggler Sep 1912
25. The Invisible Ray Oct 1912
26. The Campaign Grafter Nov 1912
27. The Kleptomaniac Dec 1912
28. The Opium Joint Jan 1913
29. The Vampire Feb 1913
30. The Death Thought Apr 1913
31. The Green Curse Apr 1913
32. The Sybarite May 1913
33. The Phantom Circuit Jun 1913
34. The Elixir of Life Jul 1913
35. The Dream Doctor Aug 1913
36. The Death House Sep 1913
37. The Submarine Mystery Oct 1913
38. The Bomb-Maker Nov 1913
39. The Ghouls Dec 1913
40. The Scientific Gunman Jan 1914
41. Guy Garrick (revised book edition of The Scientific Gunman) 1914
42. The Air-Pirate Jan 1914
43. The Abduction Club Feb 1914
44. The Billionaire Baby Feb 1914
45. The Radium Robber Mar 1914
46. The Eugenic Bride Apr 1914
47. The Terrorists May 1914
48. The Dead-Line May 1914
49. The Curio Shop Jun 1914
50. The Germ Letter Jul 1914
51. The Wireless Wire-Tappers Aug 1914
52. The Family Skeleton Sep 1914
53. The Devil-Worshipers Oct 1914
54. Happy Dust Nov 1914
55. The Murder Syndicate Dec 1914
56. The Stolen War-Secret Dec 1914
57. The Diamond-Queen Jan 1915
58. The X-Ray Detective Feb 1915
59. The Tango Thief Mar 1915
60. The Supertoxin Apr 1915
61. The Sixth Sense May 1915
62. The Absolute Zero Jun 1915
63. The Sleep-Maker Jul 1915
64. The Evil Eye Aug 1915
65. The House of Death Sep 1915
66. The Demon Engine Oct 1915
67. The Social Gangster Nov 1915
68. The Voodoo Mystery Dec 1915
69. The Treasure-Train Jan 1916
70. The Truth-Detector Mar 1916
71. The Soul-Analysis May 1916
72. The Mystic Poisoner Jun 1916
73. The Phantom Destroyer Jul 1916
74. The Beauty-Mask Aug 1916
75. The Love-Meter Sep 1916
76. The Vital Principle Oct 1916
77. The Submarine Mine Nov 1916
78. The Rubber Dagger Dec 1916
79. The Gun-Runner Jan 1917
80. The Sunken Treasure Feb 1917
81. The Love-Philter (The Love Potion) Apr 1917
82. The Panama Plot May 1917
83. The Black Diamond Jun 1917
84. The Bitter Water Jul 1917
85. The Nitrate King Aug 1917
86. The Coca Gang Oct 1917
87. The Phantom Parasite Nov 1917
88. The Door of Dread Jan 1918
89. The Black Cross Feb 1918
90. The Psychic Scar Apr 1918
91. The Star-Shell May 1918
92. The Film Murder Jun 1918
93. The Film Tragedy Jul 1918
94. The Treason Trust Jul 1918
95. The Sinister Shadow Aug 1918
96. The Love-Game Aug 1918
97. The Soul Scar Sep 1918
98. The Green Death 1918
99. Thicker Than Water Sep 1923
100. The Radio Detective Oct 1923
101. Dead Men Tell Tales Oct 1923
102. The Radio Wraith Nov 1923
103. The Hawk Dec 1923
104. Deep-Sea Treasure Jan 1924
105. The Jazz Addict Jan 1924
106. The Counterfeit Beauty Feb 1924
107. A Son of the North Woods Feb 1924
108. The Polar Flight of ZR-10 Mar 1924
109. The Honour System May 1924
110. The Greatest Mystery Jul 1924
111. The Return of the Bon Homme Richard Jul 1924
112. TheFrozen Paper Aug 1924
113. The Elements: Air Sep 1924
114. The Ghost Chase Sep 1924
115. Synthetic Love Sep 1924
116. The Elements: Fire Oct 1924
117. The Elements: Earth Oct 1924
118. The Hypocrites Oct 1924
119. The Elements: Water Nov 1924
120. The Fumes of Folly Nov 1924
121. The Voice in the Dark Nov 1924
122. The Barn-Burner Dec 1924
123. The Compass: North Dec 1924
124. The Compass: East Dec 1924
125. The Compass: South Jan 1925
126. The Compass: West Jan 1925
127. The Six Senses: Sight Jan 1925
128. The Gas Tramp Jan 1925
129. The Six Senses: Smell Feb 1925
130. The Six Senses: Taste Feb 1925
131. The Six Senses: Touch Feb 1925
132. The Six Senses: Hearing Feb 1925
133. The Six Senses: The "Sixth" Sense Mar 1925
134. Woman's Wiles Mar 1925
135. The Long Arm Apr 1925
136. Land Poor May 1925
137. Revenge May 1925
138. Dead Beets Aug 1925
139. Harvest Home Nov 1925
140. Pandora, or: the World Tomorrow Jan 1926
141. Craig Kennedy Gets His Girl Jul 1928
142. Craig Kennedy Gets the Dope Jul 1928
143. Craig Kennedy and the Model Aug 1928
144. Craig Kennedy and the Ghost Aug 1928
145. Blood Will Tell Sep 1928
146. Radiant Doom Oct 1928
147. The Dead Line Oct 1928
148. Craig Kennedy Splits Hairs Oct 1928
149. The Christmas Case Dec 1928
150. The Mystery Ray Feb 1929
151. The Beauty Wrecker Mar 1929
152. Poisoned Music Aug 1929
153. The Crime Student Sep 1929
154. The Gigolo Mystery Oct 1929
155. The Mystery of the Phantom Voice Nov 1929
156. The House of a Hundred Murders Dec 1929
157. The Mystery in the Mire Jan 1930
158. The Mystery of the Bulawayo Diamond Jan 1930
159. The Kidnap Club Apr 1932
160. Death in the Cards May 1932
161. The Junior League Murder Jun 1932
162. Murder Under the Southern Cross July 1932
163. Murder Never Dies Aug 1932
164. Murder in Green Sep 1932
165. Murder on the Mike Dec 1932
166. Murder in the Tourist Camp Dec 1932
167. The Electric War Sep 1933
168. The Golden Grave Oct 1933
169. The Inca Dagger Jan 1934
170. Murder at Night Aug 1934
171. The Death Cry May 1935

== Adaptations ==
The character's name was spoofed in 1916 by Douglas Fairbanks, who played "Coke Ennyday" in the cocaine comedy film and Sherlock Holmes sendup The Mystery of the Leaping Fish.

Detective Craig Kennedy was also played by Arnold Daly in the 1914 film serial The Exploits of Elaine as well as its 1915 sequel, The New Exploits of Elaine.

Herbert Rawlinson portrayed Craig Kennedy in the silent serial film The Carter Case (1919). Robert Warwick took the role in the early sound film Unmasked (1929). Jack Mulhall played Kennedy in the serial The Clutching Hand (1936) for the Weiss Brothers, who also produced the 1951 television series Craig Kennedy, Criminologist, which was based on the same character. Donald Woods portrayed Craig Kennedy in the television series.

== See also ==
- List of fictional medical examiners
