= Jacques Presburg =

Dutch composer, musician and conductor

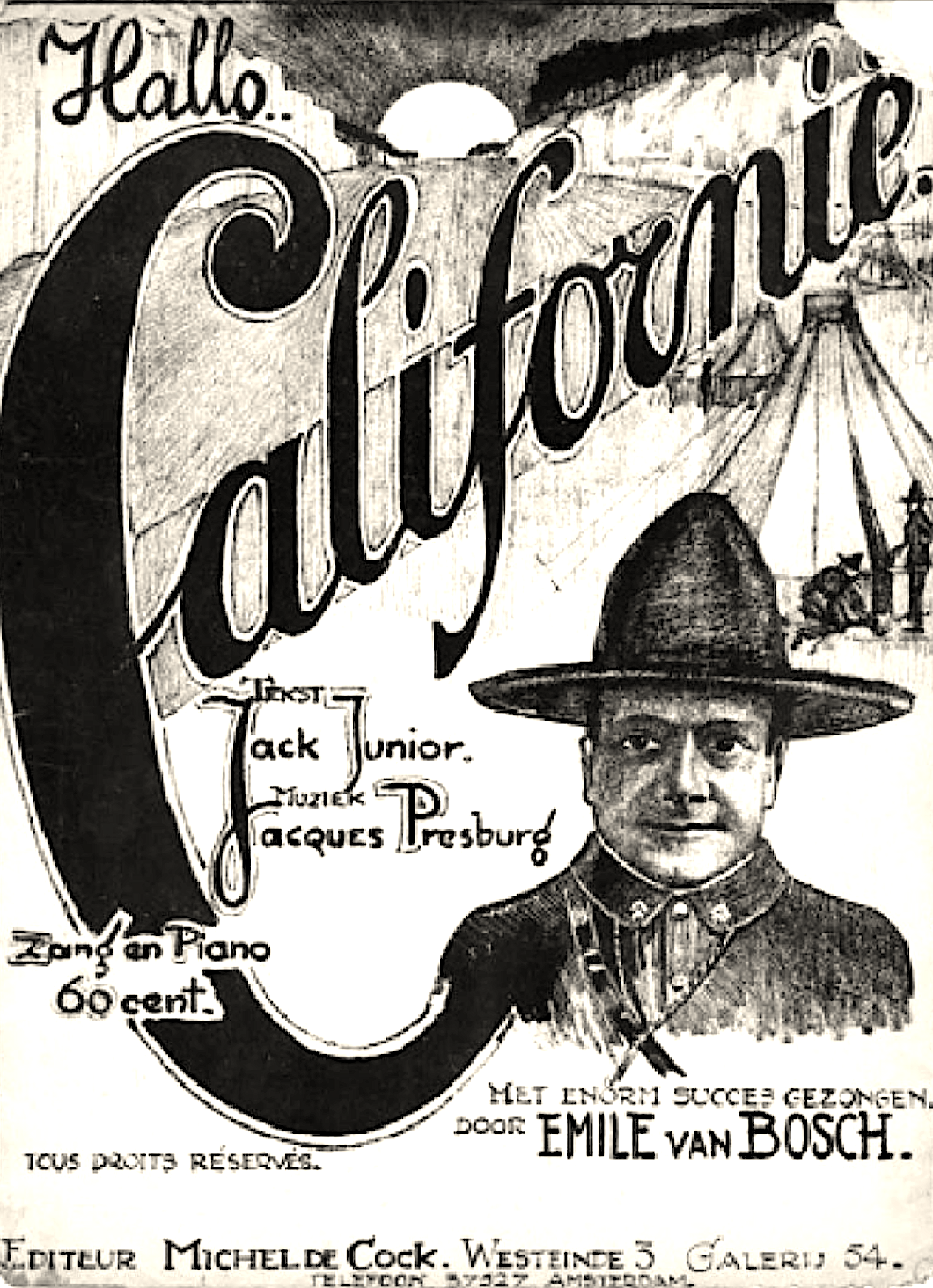
Poster for the original production of Hallo, Californië

Jacques Presburg (born Isaäc Jacob Presburg; 26 December 1881 – 5 February 1943) was a Dutch composer of theatre music, pianist, violinist, and conductor. After training as a musician in his native Amsterdam, he was active as a chamber musician and accompanist in England. In 1917 he relocated to the United States and settled in New York City, where he worked as a music educator and a musician in the orchestra of the Rialto Theatre. He co-wrote with Charles Jules, and orchestrated, the music to the musical Oh, What A Girl!, which played in 1919 on Broadway.

By 1924, Presburg was again working in England as a pianist at the Pleasure Gardens Theatre. He returned to his native country, where he had a success with the American western-themed operetta Hallo, Californië (Hello, California) which opened in 1926 and played well into 1928 in Amsterdam before touring the Netherlands. He relocated to Berlin, Germany, where he worked under the name Jack Presburg as the band leader of a jazz orchestra. He also made recordings in Germany on the Ultraphon record label using both this name and the pseudonym Jack Burg. With the rise of Nazi Germany he was forced to leave in 1938, because of his Jewish ancestry, and returned to the Netherlands. Following the German invasion of the Netherlands in 1940 during World War II he was taken to the Auschwitz concentration camp, where he was killed in 1943.

== Early life and career ==
Jacques "Jack" Presburg was born into a Jewish family in Amsterdam, Netherlands, on 26 December 1881. He was the son of Jakob Presburg and his wife Klara van Praag. He was trained as a musician in his native city. His father was a violinist, clarinetist, conductor, and composer who went by the name Jacques A. Presburg (born August 2, 1857).

By 1906 Presburg moved to the United Kingdom, where, into the following year, he gave concerts as a pianist and violist at the Westgate Road Assembly Rooms in Newcastle upon Tyne, under the auspices of the Classical Concert Society. In 1907 he was a member of the classical Fransella Quartet, in which he played both violin and piano in chamber music concerts in the United Kingdom. In June 1908 Presburg served as the accompanist to New Zealand violinist Vera French for her second recital given at Aeolian Hall, London. That October he was the accompanist for the soprano Nellie Melba for a concert she gave at Victoria Hall in Sunderland. The following month he accompanied the Dutch violinist Haidee Voorzanger for her recital at St James's Hall, which was organized by diplomat Herman van Roijen. In June and July 1909 he reunited with Albert Fransella as his accompanist for flute recitals given at Queen's Hall. A 1920 newspaper article claims that he was employed at the Royal Opera House during his years in England, but it does not provide further details.

In 1910 Presburg travelled to the United States on the RMS Majestic and arriving at Ellis Island on 6 October 1910. His stay was relatively short, as he was back in England by April of the following year working in Staffordshire as a musician at the Grand Theatre, Hanley. In 1912 he married Emily Marks in Kingston upon Hull.

== Work in the United States ==
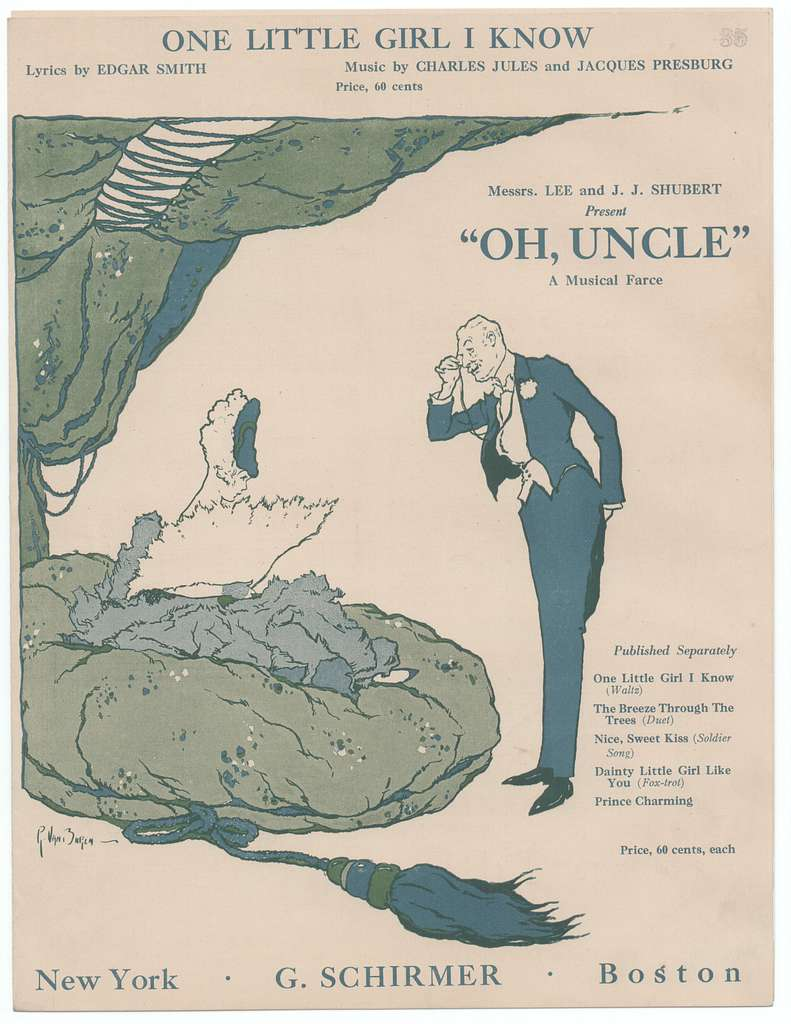
Front cover of 1919 sheet music for Presburg, Charles Jules, and Edgar Smith's song "One Little Girl I Know" from Oh, Uncle (later retitled Oh, What A Girl!)

With his wife, Presburg returned to the United States via the SS Philadelphia in January 1917. He settled in New York City where he worked as a music educator. In 1920 he joined the staff of a music school for opera singers in New York founded by Mario Salvini where he was employed as a vocal coach.

In collaboration with Swiss-born composer Charles Jules, Presburg cowrote the music to the musical Oh, What A Girl!, which played on Broadway in 1919. Presburg was also the orchestrator for this musical. The musical is about a man who competes with his uncle for the romantic affections of a cabaret singer. After two tryouts, beset by a summer heatwave and an Actors' Equity Association strike, the Broadway run lasted only 68 performances, despite mainly positive reviews. Toronto Star Weekly praised the work's "catchy score", and The Philadelphia Inquirer stated that it was "quite melodious and light and entertaining enough to make one almost forget the heat". Nevertheless, the show failed to produce a "hit song", which may also have impacted ticket sales. After the close of the New York run, the musical toured the United States and Canada into 1920.

Presburg was a member of the orchestra of the Rialto Theatre when that orchestra began labor disputes in 1921, leading to a mass exodus of players. He was named president of the body of 50 musicians that had left the theatre. In September and October 1921 Presburg served as the conductor of this group for performances at the Manhattan Opera House and Brooklyn Academy of Music in which they accompanied the silent film The Three Musketeers (1916). Initially this group played under the name the Original Rialto Orchestra, but a court enjoined them from using the name after a legal action by the owners of the Rialto Theatre. In November 1921 Presburg conducted an orchestra that accompanied the silent film Theodora for performances at the Pitt Theatre in Pittsburgh.

== Later life; death in Auschwitz ==
By August 1924 Presburg was back in England working as a pianist at the Pleasure Gardens Theatre. He returned to his native country where his operetta Hallo, Californië was premiered with success by the Amsterdamsche Operette Gezelschap at the Floratheater in Amsterdam in October 1926, with producer Léon Boedels backing the show. The librettist for that work was Jaap à Cohen Treves who wrote under the pseudonym Jack Junior. It ran in Amsterdam well into 1928, closing after more than 160 performances. It then toured the Netherlands. According to Dutch historians Elisabeth Koning and Wilfred Takken, Hallo, Californië was "one of the most popular Dutch operettas of the twentieth century" and featured many of the tropes of the American western, including cowboys and Indians, a Sioux dance, pistol shootouts, and exploding dynamite. A black character, Sam Black (portrayed in blackface in the original production), narrowly escapes a lynching led by the show's villain, a member of the Ku Klux Klan. It was revived in 1938 at the Arena Theater in Rotterdam.

Following the success of Hallo, Californië, Presburg relocated to Berlin, Germany, where he was the band leader of a popular jazz orchestra. The Berlin music publisher Albert Stahl published Presburg's tango "Ich kenn ein kleines Mädchen" in 1929. He made several recordings with the Ultraphon record label, sometimes using the pseudonym Jack Burg. He remained in Berlin until 1938 when the Nazis forced him to leave Germany due to his Jewish ancestry. He returned to the Netherlands and lived there until, after the German invasion of the Netherlands in 1940, he was forcibly taken to the Auschwitz concentration camp. He was killed there by the Nazis on 5 February 1943.
