= Arthur B. Reeve =

American novelist (1880–1936)

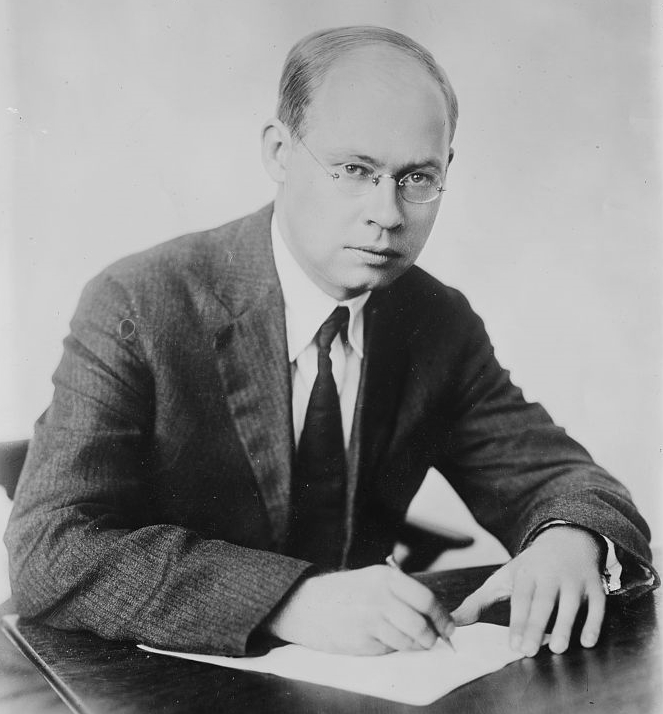
- Born: Arthur Benjamin Reeve; October 15, 1880; New York City, U.S.
- Died: August 9, 1936 (aged 55); Trenton, New Jersey, U.S.
- Education: Princeton University; New York Law School
- Occupation: Writer
- Writing career
- Genre: Mystery fiction

Arthur Benjamin Reeve (October 15, 1880 – August 9, 1936) was an American mystery writer. He is known best for creating the series character Professor Craig Kennedy, sometimes called "The American Sherlock Holmes", and Kennedy's Dr. Watson-like sidekick Walter Jameson, a newspaper reporter, for 18 detective novels. Reeve is famous mostly for the 82 Craig Kennedy stories, published in Cosmopolitan magazine between 1910 and 1918. These were collected in book form; with the third collection, the short stories were published grouped together as episodic novels. The 12-volume publication Craig Kennedy Stories was released during 1918; it reissued Reeve's books-to-date as a matched set.

== Biography ==
Born in Brooklyn, Reeve graduated from Princeton and attended New York Law School. He worked as an editor and journalist before acquiring fame from the first Craig Kennedy story during 1911. Raised in Brooklyn, he lived most of his professional life at various addresses near Long Island Sound. In 1932, he relocated to New Jersey (Trenton) to be nearer his alma mater, Princeton. He died in Trenton in 1936.

Starting with The Exploits of Elaine (1914), Reeve began authoring screenplays. His movie career was the most productive during 1919–20, when his name was credited for seven movies, most of them serials, three of them featuring Harry Houdini. After that, probably because of the movie industry's migration to Hollywood and Reeve's desire to remain in the east, Reeve worked more sporadically with movies. He published much fiction originally in newspapers, and a variety of magazines including Boys' Life, Country Gentleman, and Everybody's Magazine. Eventually, he was published only in pulps such as Detective Fiction Weekly and Detective Story Magazine. During 1927, Reeve contracted with John S. Lopez to write a series of movie scenarios for the notorious millionaire-murderer, Harry K. Thaw, on the subject of fake spiritualists. The deal resulted in a lawsuit when Thaw refused to pay. During late 1928, Reeve declared bankruptcy.

During the 1930s, Reeve changed his career by becoming an anti-rackets crusader. He hosted a national radio program from July 1930 to March 1931, published a history of the rackets titled The Golden Age of Crime, and the emphasis of his Craig Kennedy stories completed Reeve's transition from "scientific detective" work to combatting organized crime.

During his career, Reeve reported many celebrated crime cases for various newspapers, including the murder of William Desmond Taylor in 1922, and the trial of Lindbergh baby kidnapper, Bruno Hauptmann, who was executed in 1936.

== Publications ==
The most complete biographical and bibliographical information on Reeve is available in From Ghouls to Gangsters: The Career of Arthur B. Reeve Volume 1 (fiction) and Volume 2 (nonfiction) (Locke, editor).

Some of his stories include:

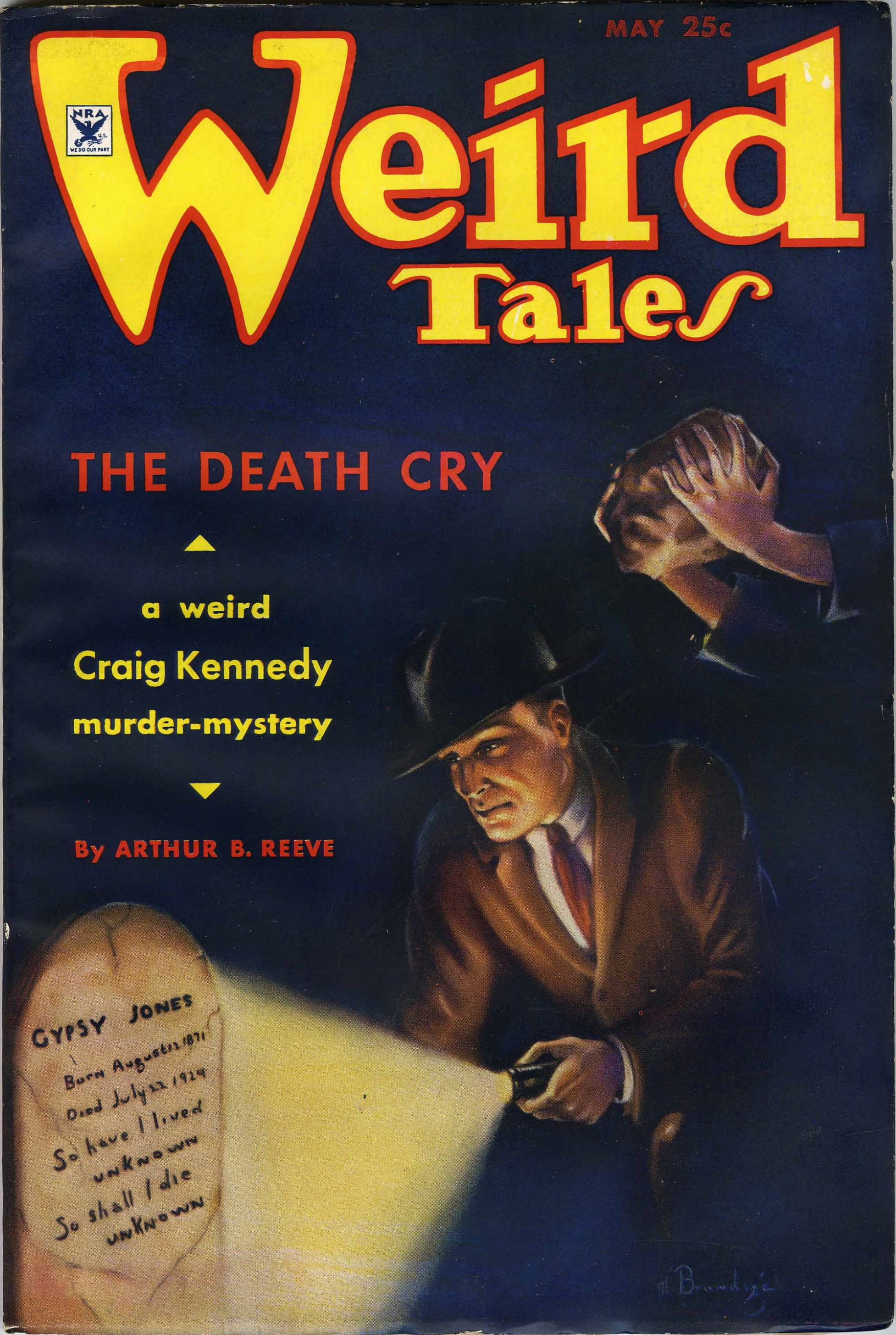
Reeve's novelette "The Death Cry", featuring his popular detective Craig Kennedy, was the cover story for the May 1935 issue of the magazine Weird Tales.

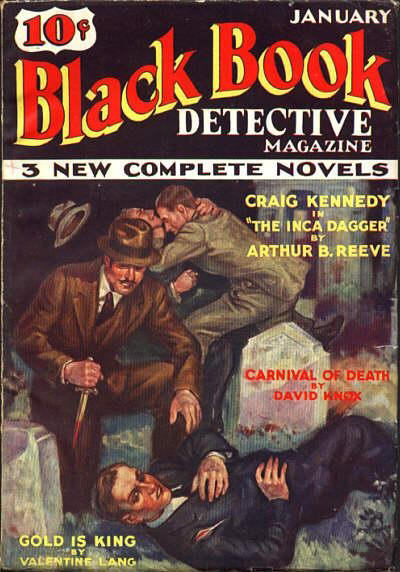
Reeve's "The Inca Dagger", also featuring Craig Kennedy, was the cover story for the January 1934 issue of the magazine Black Book Detective.

- "The Invisible Ray" (1911), short story in Cosmopolitan, Oct 1912, reprinted later in The Poisoned Pen: The Further Adventures of Craig Kennedy
- "The Campaign Grafter" (November 1912), short story in Hearst's Magazine
- "The Poisoned Pen" (1912), short story in Cosmopolitan May 1912, reprinted later in The Poisoned Pen: The Further Adventures of Craig Kennedy.
- The Silent Bullet aka The Black Hand (1912), novel.
- Constance Dunlap (1913).
- "The Dream Doctor" (1913), short story in Cosmopolitan August, 1913, later reprinted in The Dream Doctor: The Further Adventures of Craig Kennedy.
- Guy Garrick (1914), later reprinted in Guy Garrick: The Further Adventures of Craig Kennedy
- The Exploits of Elaine (1914), movie serial.
- Gold of the Gods (1915).
- The Romance of Elaine (1915), silent movie (the sequel to The Exploits of Elaine).
- The Problem of the Steel Door.
- The War Terror (1915), reprinted later in The War Terror: The Further Adventures of Craig Kennedy.
- The Ear In The Wall (1916).
- "The Treasure-Train" (1916) short story in Cosmopolitan January 1916, reprinted later in The Treasure Train: The Further Adventures of Craig Kennedy.
- "The Adventuress: A Craig Kennedy detective story" (1917) short story published by "Harper & Brothers".
- The House of Hate (1918), silent serial film.
- The Master Mystery (1918), silent serial film.
- The Soul Scar (1919), Scientific Mystery Novel.
- The Grim Game (1919), silent movie.
- Terror Island (1920), silent movie.
- The Mystery Mind (1920).
- The Film Mystery (1921).
- The Radio Detective (Boys' Life 1925 serial, 1926 movie serial, and novelization).
- The White Slave (1927), silent movie.
- The Golden Age of Crime (1931).
- "The Death Cry", the cover story in Weird Tales (May 1935).
- The Stars Scream Murder (1936).
