= Pearl White filmography =

The complete filmography of silent serial star Pearl White 1910–24.

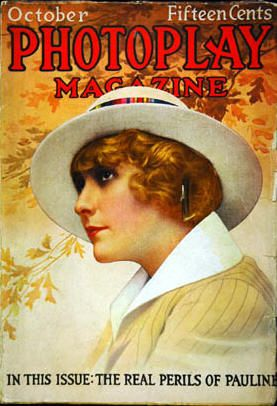
Photoplay.

== 1910 ==
- His Yankee Girl (Short)
- The Missing Bridegroom (Short) as Clarice Moulton
- The Horse Shoer's Girl (Short)
- The Burlesque Queen (Short)
- The Matinee Idol (Short) as Helen Durand
- The Music Teacher (Short) as Louise Faber
- A Woman's Wit (Short) as Grace Brown
- The Sheriff and Miss Jones (Short) as Mary Noyes
- The New Magdalene (Short) as Mercy Merrick
- The Woman Hater (Short)
- When the World Sleeps (Short) as Mrs. Madison

== 1911 ==
- Monte Cristo (Short) as Mercedes
- An Unforeseen Complication (Short) as The Professor's Daughter
- Home Sweet Home (Short) as Mary Lanon
- Helping Him Out (Short) as Pearl
- The Angel of the Slums (Short) as The Angel of the Slums
- The Heart of an Indian Maid (Short) as Indian Maid
- The Society Girl and the Gypsy (Short) as Grace
- The Stepsisters (Short) as The Stepmother's Spoiled Daughter
- His Birthday (Short) as Mrs. Grey - the Wife
- Memories of the Past (Short)
- The Flaming Arrows (Short)
- The Message of the Arrow (Short)
- Through the Window (Short)
- A Prisoner of the Mohicans (Short)
- The Squaw's Mistaken Love (Short) as Pearl
- For Massa's Sake (Short)
- Love Molds Labor (Short) as Margaret Fuller - the Foreman's Sweetheart
- The Terms of the Will (Short)
- The Power of Love (Short) as Margaret Fuller - the Foreman's Sweetheart
- Love's Renunciation (Short)
- Western Postemistress (Short) as The Western Postmistress
- The Reporter (Short) as Alice Wayne
- The Lost Necklace (Short) as The Sleepwalking Heroine
- The Fatal Portrait (Short) as Madeleine
- The Doll (Short) as The Wife

== 1912 ==
- The Life of Buffalo Bill (Short)
- For the Honor of the Name (Short)
- The Arrowmaker's Daughter (Short) as The Arrowmaker's Daughter
- The Hand of Destiny (Short) as Señora Martinez - the Wife
- The Man from the North Pole (Short)
- The Girl in the Next Room (Short) as Alice Brady
- Naughty Marietta (Short) as Marietta
- McGuirk, the Sleuth (Short) as Byrdie May
- Her Dressmaker's Bills (Short) as Mrs. Owing
- The Only Woman in Town (Short) as The Widow Chase
- Bella's Beaus (Short) as Bella
- The Blonde Lady (Short) as Mabel
- A Pair of Fools (Short) as Pearl
- Oh, Such a Night! (Short) as Pearl
- The Gypsy Flirt (Short) as Mabel
- The Chorus Girl (Short) as The Wife a.k.a. The Chorus Girl
- Her Old Love (Short) as Irene
- The Valet and the Maid (Short) as The Maid
- The Quarrel (Short) as Mrs. Lovey
- Locked Out (Short) as Mrs. Happy
- The Spendthrift's Reform (Short) as Mrs. Dan Steele
- A Tangled Marriage (Short) as Pearl
- The Mind Cure (Short) as Pearl
- Oh! That Lemonade (Short) as The Widow
- His Wife's Stratagem (Short) as Pearl
- Her Visitor (Short) as Pearl Burnham
- The Mad Lover (Short) as Ethel Marion

== 1913 ==
- Her Kid Sister (Short) as Pearl
- Heroic Harold (Short) as Pearl
- A Night at the Club (Short) as Mrs. Boredman
- The Fake Gas-Man (Short) as Bridget the Maid
- A Dip Into Society (Short) as Maggie the Maid
- The False Alarm (Short) as Minor Role
- Pearl's Admirers (Short) as Pearl
- With Her Rival's Help (Short) as Nellie
- Box and Cox (Short) as Tillie - the Housemaid
- Her Lady Friend (Short) as Miss Alden
- Accident Insurance (Short) as Pearl
- Strictly Business (Short) as Pearl
- An Awful Scene (Short)
- That Other Girl (Short) as Pearl
- Schultz's Lottery Ticket (Short) as Mrs. Schultz
- An Innocent Bridegroom (Short) as The Widow Keene
- A Night in the Town (Short) as Nellie Thomas - the Housemaid
- Ma and the Boys (Short) as Violet
- Knights and Ladies (Short) as Pearl
- Who Is the Goat? (Short) as Pearl Sweet
- Calicowani (Short) as Mrs. Blake
- Lovers Three (Short) as Pearl
- His Twin Brother (Short) as Dolly
- The Drummer's Note Book (Short) as Pearl
- Pearl as a Clairvoyant (Short) as Pearl
- The Veiled Lady (Short) as Pearl
- Our Parents-In-Law (Short) as Carrie
- Two Lunatics (Short) as Pearl
- His Romantic Wife (Short) as Mrs. Cool
- Forgetful Flossie (Short) as Forgetful Flossie
- A Joke on the Sheriff (Short) as The Widow Floss
- When Love Is Young (Short) as Pearl
- Pearl as a Detective (Short) as Pearl
- Oh, Whiskers! (Short) as Miss Hegg
- His Awful Daughter (Short) as Nellie
- Our Willie (Short) as Willie's Ma
- Homlock Shermes (Short) as Pearl - the Girl Detective
- Toodelums (Short) as Pearl
- A Supper for Three (Short)
- Where Charity Begins (Short) as Helen Morris
- Hooked (Short) as Mrs. Short
- Clancy, the Model (Short)
- Mary's Romance (Short) as Mary
- The New Typist (Short) as Pearl - the Office Stenographer
- False Love and True (Short) as Grace Roberts
- Her Joke on Belmont (Short) as The Doctor's Sister
- A Call from Home (Short)
- Will Power (Short) as Pearl
- The Smuggled Laces (Short)
- Out of the Past (Short) as Rose Vale - the Country Girl
- Who Is in the Box? (Short) as Pearl
- An Hour of Terror (Short) as Mrs. Brown
- The Girl Reporter (Short) as Pearl White - the Girl Reporter
- Muchly Engaged (Short)
- True Rivalry (Short) as Georgia Allison
- Pearl's Dilemma (Short) as Pearl Howell, a Young Matron
- The Hall-Room Girls (Short) as Pearl
- The Broken Spell (Short) as Valerie Monroe
- College Chums (Short) as Pearl
- The Paper Doll (Short) as Alice Wilson
- What Papa Got (Short) as Pearl
- A Child's Influence (Short)
- Starving for Love (Short) as Mabel
- Oh! You Scotch Lassie (Short) as Pearl
- How Women Love (Short) as Alice Howard
- Pearl and the Tramp (Short) as Pearl
- The Great Influence (Short) as Norah
- Caught in the Act (Short) as Mrs. Brown
- That Crying Baby (Short)
- His Aunt Emma (Short) as Pearl
- Much Ado About Nothing (Short) as Pearl
- Lost in the Night (Short) as Pearl Barry
- Some Luck (Short)
- Pleasing Her Husband (Short) as Pearl Greene
- The Hand of Providence (Short) as Pearl
- A News Item (Short) as Pearl
- Misplaced Love (Short) as Rose
- Pearl and the Poet (Short) as Pearl
- The Last Gamble (Short) as Pearl Letterell
- The Dress Reform (Short) as Pearl - the Wife
- The Woman and the Law (Short) as Pearl
- Pearl's Mistake (Short) as Pearl
- Hearts Entangled (Short)
- Willie's Great Scheme (Short) as Pearl
- Robert's Lesson (Short) as Pearl
- The Rich Uncle (Short) as Pearl
- A Hidden Love (Short) as Alice
- Girls Will Be Boys (Short) as Pearl
- When Duty Calls (Short) as Grace
- Daisy Wins (Short)
- Oh! You Pearl (Short) as Pearl
- Out of the Grave (Short)
- Her Secretaries (Short) as Pearl
- The Cabaret Singer (Short) as Madge
- Hubby's New Coat (Short) as Mrs. Joyful
- The Convict's Daughter (Short) as Pearl Bentley - the Convict's Daughter
- A Woman' Revenge (Short)
- Pearl's Hero (Short) as Pearl
- First Love (Short)
- The Soubrette (Short) as The Soubrette
- The Heart of an Artist (Short) as Aline Morey
- The Lure of the Stage (Short) as Lola - the Actress
- The Kitchen Mechanic (Short) as Sal
- Through Fire and Air

== 1914 ==
- The Lifted Veil (Short)
- Shadowed (Short) as The Suspicious Wife
- The Ring (Short) as Mrs. Gray
- It May Come to This (Short) as Wifey
- A Father's Devotion (Short)
- Jones' Burglar Trap (Short) as Mrs. Jones
- The Shadow of a Crime (Short) as Edith Winslow
- Oh! You Puppy (Short) as Pearl
- A Grateful Outcast (Short) as Pearl
- What Didn't Happen to Mary? (Short) as Mary
- For a Woman (Short) as Nellie
- Getting Reuben Back (Short) as Annie
- A Sure Cure (Short)
- McSweeney's Masterpiece (Short) as Cleopatra
- Lizzie and the Iceman (Short) as Lizzie
- The Fat and Thin of It (Short) as Pearl - the Professor's Assistant
- The Perils of Pauline (Serial)
- Going Some (Short) as Pearl
- The Lady Doctor (Short)
- Get Out and Get Under (Short) as Pearl
- A Telephone Engagement (Short) as Pearl White
- The Mashers (Short)
- The Dancing Craze (Short) as The Tango Instructor
- Easy Money (Short) as Lizzie
- The Girl in Pants (Short) as Vivian's Mother
- Her New Hat (Short) as Pearl
- What Pearl's Pearls Did (Short) as Pearl
- Willie's Disguise (Short) as Pearl - the Schoolteacher
- Was He a Hero? (Short)
- East Lynne in Bugville (Short)
- Liferitis (Short)
- Some Collectors (Short)
- Oh! You Mummy (Short) as The Mummy
- The Exploits of Elaine (Serial) as Elaine Dodge

== 1915 ==
- Oh! You City Girl (Short)
- A Lady in Distress (Short)
- Sapho Up-to-Date (Short)
- The New Exploits of Elaine as Elaine Dodge
- The Romance of Elaine as Elaine Dodge

== 1916 ==
- The King's Game as Catherine Dardinilis
- Hazel Kirke as Hazel Kirke
- The Iron Claw (Serial) as Margery Golden
- Pearl of the Army as Pearl Date

== 1917 ==
- Mayblossom as Anabel Lee
- The Fatal Ring as Violet Standish

== 1918 ==
- The House of Hate as Pearl Grant (Waldon) / Jenny Acton

== 1919 ==
- The Lightning Raider (Serial) as The Lightning Raider
- The Black Secret (Serial) as Evelyn Ereth

== 1920 ==
- The White Moll as Rhoda, The White Moll
- The Tiger's Cub as Tiger's Cub
- The Thief (Short) as Mary Vantyne

== 1921 ==
- The Mountain Woman as Alexander McGiverns
- Know Your Men as Ellen Schuyler
- Beyond Price as Sally Marrio
- Annabel's Romance
- A Virgin Paradise as Gratia Latham

== 1922 ==
- Any Wife as Myrtle (Mrs. John Hill)
- The Broadway Peacock as Myrtle May
- Without Fear as Ruth Hamilton

== 1923 ==
- Plunder (Serial) as Pearl Travers

== 1924 ==
- Terror as Hélène Lorfeuil (final film role)
