= Chester Barnett =

American actor

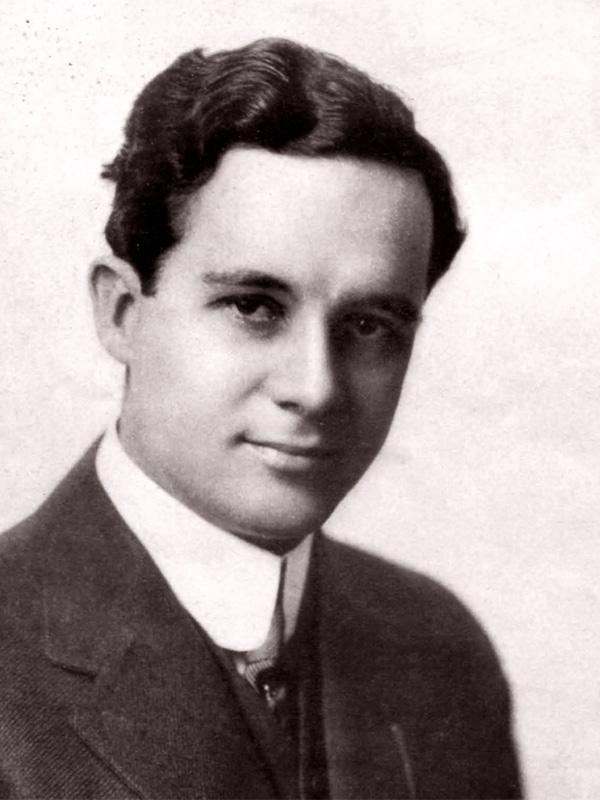

Chester Barnett (February 29, 1884 - September 22, 1947) was an actor in American silent films and a screenwriter.

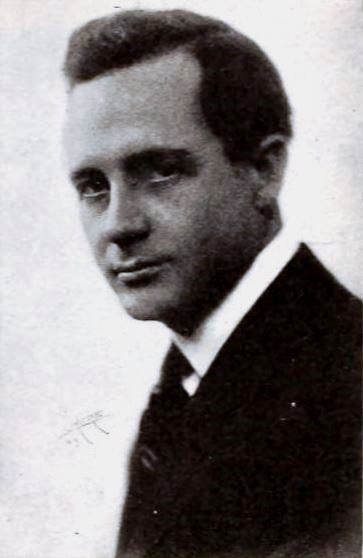
1920

He starred with Pearl White in Crystal Film Company comedy shorts.

He appeared on a souvenir postcard.

He died in Jefferson City, Missouri.

Chapman University has a postcard of him.

== Filmography ==
- The Mind Cure (1912)
- Will Power (1913)
- Oh, Whiskers! as The Barber (1913)
- A Night in the Town (1913)
- How Men Propose (1913)
- Pearl as a Detective (1913)
- An Innocent Bridegroom (1913)
- How Men Propose (1913)
- The Wishing Ring (1914) as The Earl's Son Giles
- The Heart of the Blue Ridge (1915)
- A Girl's Folly (1915)
- The Rack (1915 film) as Jack Freeman
- The Waking Dreamer (1915)
- What Happened to Jones (1915 film) as Richard Heatherly
- Trilby (1915)
- La Bohème (1916 film) as Marcel
- Public Be Damned (1917)
- The Law of Compensation (1917)
- The Challenge Accepted (1918) as Steve Carey
- The Great Adventure (1918) as Billy Blake
- Together (1918) as Jim Watson
- Woman (1918) as The fisherman
- The Challenge Accepted (1918) as Steve Carey
- A Wild Goose Chase (1919)
- Break the News to Mother (1919) as Doctor Sims
- Girl of the Sea (1920) as Lieut. Tom Ross
