= Woman Hater =

Woman Hater, Woman Haters or woman hater may also refer to:

- Woman hater, a person who practices misogyny, the hatred or contempt for women
- The Woman Hater, a 1606 Jacobean era stage play by Francis Beaumont and John Fletcher
- The Woman Hater (1910 Powers film), a 1910 film starring Pearl White by the Powers Company
- The Woman Hater (1910 Thanhouser film), a 1910 film featuring Violet Heming by the Thanhouser Company
- The Woman Hater (1925 film), a 1925 American silent drama film
- The Woman Haters, a 1913 short comedy film featuring Fatty Arbuckle
- Woman Haters, a 1934 short film starring the Three Stooges
- Woman Hater (1948 film), a British romantic comedy
- The Woman Hater, a satiric comedy play by Frances Burney
- Sone ha-Nashim (The Woman-Hater), a humorous satire written by Judah ibn Shabbethai
