= Grace Darling (actress) =

American actress

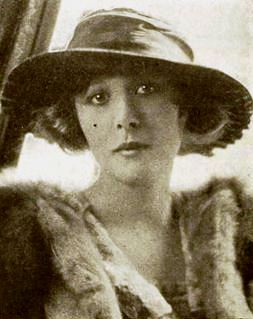
- Born: Grace Foster; November 20, 1893; New York City, U.S.
- Died: October 7, 1963 (aged 69)
- Occupation: Actress
- Years active: 1913–1921
- Spouses: Pat Rooney (m. 1908, divorced) Harry Turek (div. 1915)

Grace Darling (née Foster; November 20, 1893 – October 7, 1963) was an American actress who was active in Hollywood during the silent era. She was best known for her role as Beatrice Fairfax in a 1916 serial of the same name.

== Biography ==
Darling was reportedly born in New York City. By the mid-1910s, she was under contract at Hearst-Selig, and would write travelogues for Hearst papers from her globe-trotting adventures. She was a bit eccentric, and was known for carrying around a doll dressed in imaginative outfits during the height of her fame. She was sometimes confused for the actress Ruth Darling, who died in a 1918 car crash in San Francisco. She told reporters she married actor Pat Rooney when she was 15 years old; despite their eventual divorce, she was caring for him at the time of his death. She was also married to a Harry Turek of San Francisco.

== Selected filmography ==
- Everyman's Price (1921)
- The Common Sin (1920)
- The Discarded Woman (1920)
- Even as Eve (1920)
- False Gods (1919)
- Virtuous Men (1919)
- Beatrice Fairfax (1916)
- The Glass Pistol (1914)
- How Men Propose (1913)
- The Midget's Revenge (1913)
- Pearl as a Detective (1913)
- Knights and Ladies (1913)
