= How Moscha Came Back =

- Directed by: Phillips Smalley
- Produced by: Crystal Film Company
- Distributed by: Universal Film Manufacturing Company
- Release date: March 1, 1914
- Running time: 10 minutes
- Country: USA
- Language: Silent..English titles

How Moscha Came Back is a 1914 silent film comedy short directed by Phillips Smalley. It was produced by the Crystal Film Company and distributed through Universal Film Manufacturing Company.

The film survives in the Library of Congress collection.
