= Henry G. Sell =

American actor

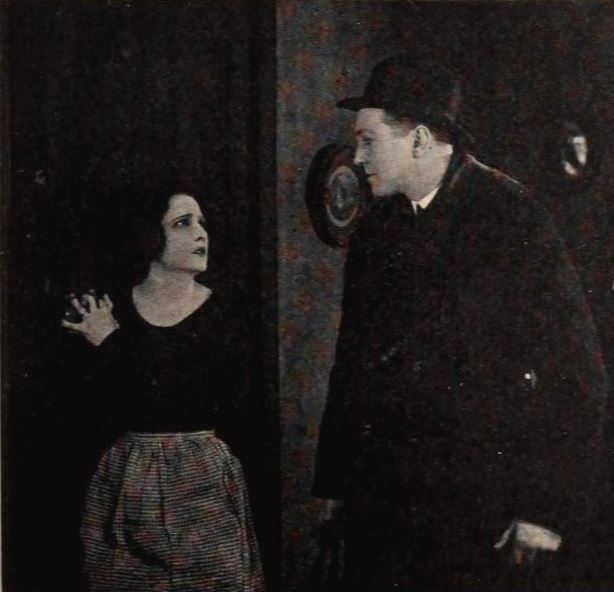
- With Mabel Ballin in East Lynne (1921)
- Born: July 31, 1884; Los Angeles, California, United States
- Died: August 20, 1968 (aged 74); Hartford, Connecticut, United States
- Occupation: Actor
- Years active: 1913–1922 (film)

Henry G. Sell (July 31, 1884 – August 20, 1968) was an American film actor of the silent era. He appeared in a number of serials produced by Pathé Exchange including several with Pearl White.

After leaving film acting in 1922, he performed on stage in Virtue?, which received an incredibly poor reception.

== Filmography ==
| Year | Title | Role | Notes |
|---|---|---|---|
| 1913 | The Greater Influence | Dick | as Henry Gsell |
| 1913 | When Duty Calls | | |
| 1913 | Out of the Grave | | |
| 1913 | The Cabaret Singer | | as Henry Gsell |
| 1913 | The Convict's Daughter | Roger Phillips | |
| 1913 | A Woman's Revenge | | |
| 1913 | The Heart of an Artist | Ralph Stewart | as Henry Gsell |
| 1913 | The Kitchen Mechanic | Hiram | |
| 1914 | The Lifted Veil | The Daughter's Sweetheart | as Henry Gsell |
| 1914 | It May Come to This | | |
| 1914 | A Father's Devotion | | |
| 1914 | A Midnight Scare | Harry | |
| 1914 | The Shadow of a Crime | The Gardener | |
| 1914 | Oh! You Puppy | | as Henry Gsell |
| 1914 | A Grateful Outcast | Roger Newton | as Henry Gsell |
| 1914 | What Didn't Happen to Mary? | | |
| 1914 | For a Woman | Captain Ronaldson | |
| 1914 | Some Doings | The Husband | |
| 1914 | McSweeney's Masterpiece | Antonio McSweeney | |
| 1914 | Get Out and Get Under | | as Henry Gsell |
| 1914 | Their Picnic | Harry | |
| 1914 | False Evidence | Richard Hunt | |
| 1914 | Oh! You Mummy | Harry | unconfirmed |
| 1915 | Fine Feathers | Dick Meade | as Henry Gsell |
| 1916 | The Iron Claw | Wrench | |
| 1917 | The Fatal Ring | Tom Carlton | |
| 1917 | The Seven Pearls | Handsome Jack | |
| 1918 | Getaway Kate | | |
| 1919 | The Lightning Raider | Thomas Babbington North | |
| 1919 | The Black Secret | | |
| 1919 | The Twin Pawns | Bo Anderson | |
| 1919 | The House Without Children | James Cranston | |
| 1919 | Thin Ice | Robert Burton | as Henry Gesell |
| 1920 | The Empire of Diamonds | Paul Bernac | |
| 1920 | A Woman in Grey | Tom Thurston | |
| 1921 | Devotion | James Marsh | |
| 1921 | East Lynne | Francis Levison | |
| 1921 | The Money Maniac | Milo d'Espail | |
| 1922 | Free Air | Jeffery Saxton | |

== Bibliography ==
- Klepper, Robert K. Silent Films, 1877-1996: A Critical Guide to 646 Movies. McFarland, 2015.
