= The Law of Compensation =

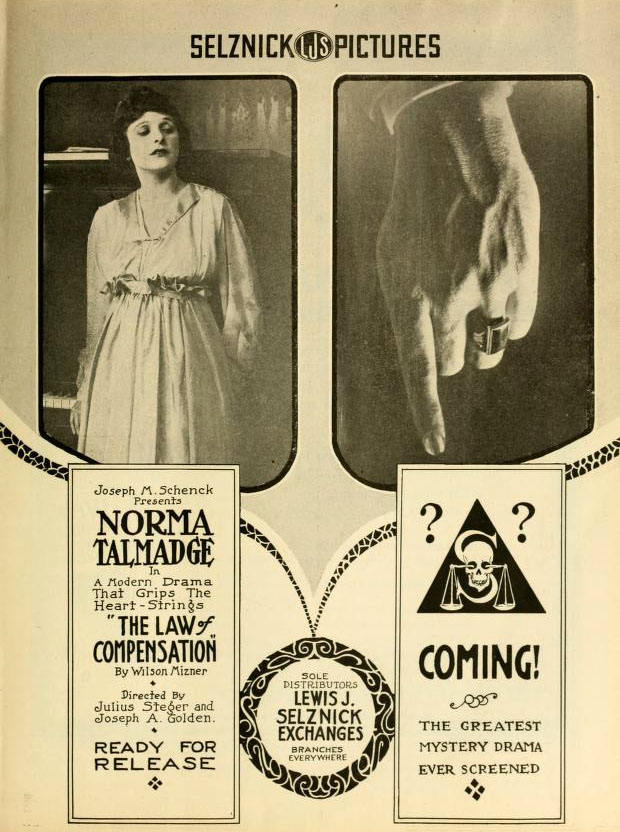
- Directed by: Joseph A. Golden, Julius Steger
- Screenplay by: Edna G. Riley
- Story by: Wilson Mizner
- Produced by: Joseph Schenck
- Distributed by: Selznick Distributing Corporation
- Release date: 1917
- Running time: 72 minutes
- Country: United States
- Language: Silent (English intertitles)

The Law of Compensation is 1917 American silent drama film based on a story by Wilson Mizner and directed by Joseph A. Golden. The film starred Norma Talmadge, who played a dual role, Fred Esmelton, and Chester Barnett. It was produced by Joseph Schenck, the husband of its star Talmadge.

== Plot ==
While her husband is out of town, Ruth is approached by Wells, a small-time song plugger. He claims that he can make a musical comedy star of her if she will come up with some money. But when she tries to ante up the funds, her father takes her aside and tells her the story of her mother who found herself in a similar situation. Her mother ran off with a man, Trevor, who later deserted her; after her death, Ruth's father tracked Trevor down and killed him. With all of this in mind, Ruth wisely decides to send Wells on his way.

== Cast ==
- Norma Talmadge as Flora Graham / Ruth Graham
- Fred Esmelton as John Graham (credited as Frederick Esmelton)
- Chester Barnett as Allen Hayes
- John Charles as Frank Trevor
- Sally Crute as Grace Benton
- Fred Hearn as Henry Thurman (credited as Fred G. Hearn)
- Mary Hall as Mrs. Wayne
- Edwin Stanley as Raymond Wells
- Robert Cummings as Horace Benton
- Marie Reichardt as Undetermined Role
- Harry Burkhardt as Undetermined Role
- Lorna Volare as Undetermined Role (credited as Baby Lorna)
- Frank Dawson as Undetermined Role

== Preservation ==
Exteriors for The Law of Compensation were taken on location in Florida, while interiors for the film were shot inside of Norma Talmadge's New York City studio.

== Commentory ==
While the lives of the mother and daughter interact through their repetition and parallel situations, the story of the mother, while referenced in the first half of the film, is withheld from Flora and the audience until it is told to her in the second half of the film. Although Talmadge is the star with two roles, the men of the film hold all the power and make all the decisions on behalf of the women; the one choice made by a woman, the mother Ruth, has immense consequences for her and her daughter as deviates it from the straight path.

== Preservation status ==
Prints of The Law of Compensation are held at the Library of Congress (incomplete) and the Museum of Modern Art, 35mm.
