= Powers Picture Plays =

American film company

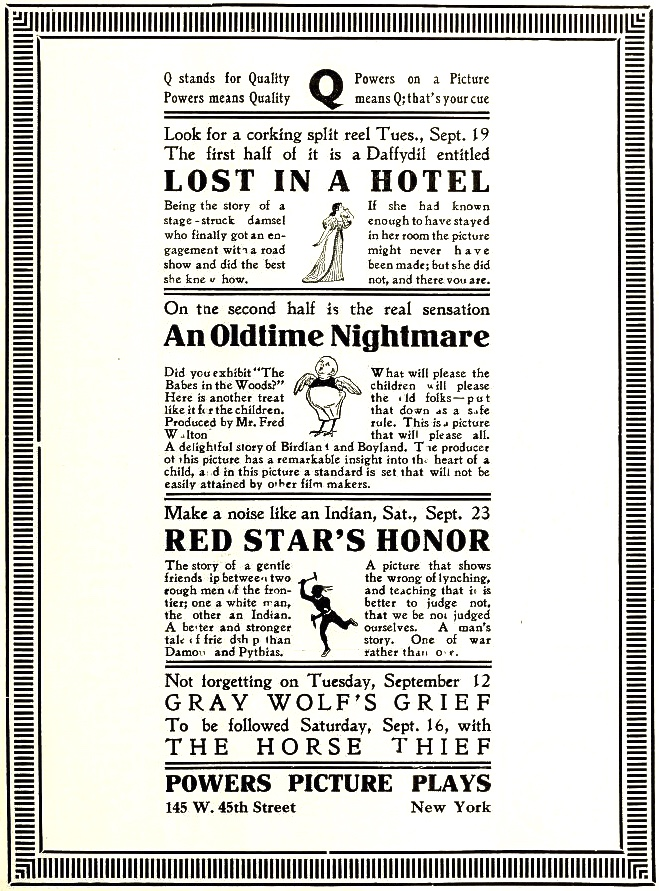
Advertisement for 1911 films

Powers Picture Plays, initially Powers Company, was an American film company established during the silent film era. It produced 839 films between 1909 and 1923, and distributed 19 films between 1909 and 1932.

Irving Cummings was a "leading man" at the studio. Thomas Evans was the studio's general manager.

== History ==
In 1909, the company was formed by Patrick "Pat" Anthony Powers (1869–1948), as Powers Company, with an office in Wakefield, New York. The same year, Powers and Irving Cummings opened a new studio in Mount Vernon, New York, near the Bronx, with Joseph A. Golden as director and Ludwig G. B. Erb as cameraman, and some films have been produced.

Locations associated with the company include 251st Street and Richardson Avenue and 145 W. 45th Street. Its films were printed on Eastman stock according to an ad.

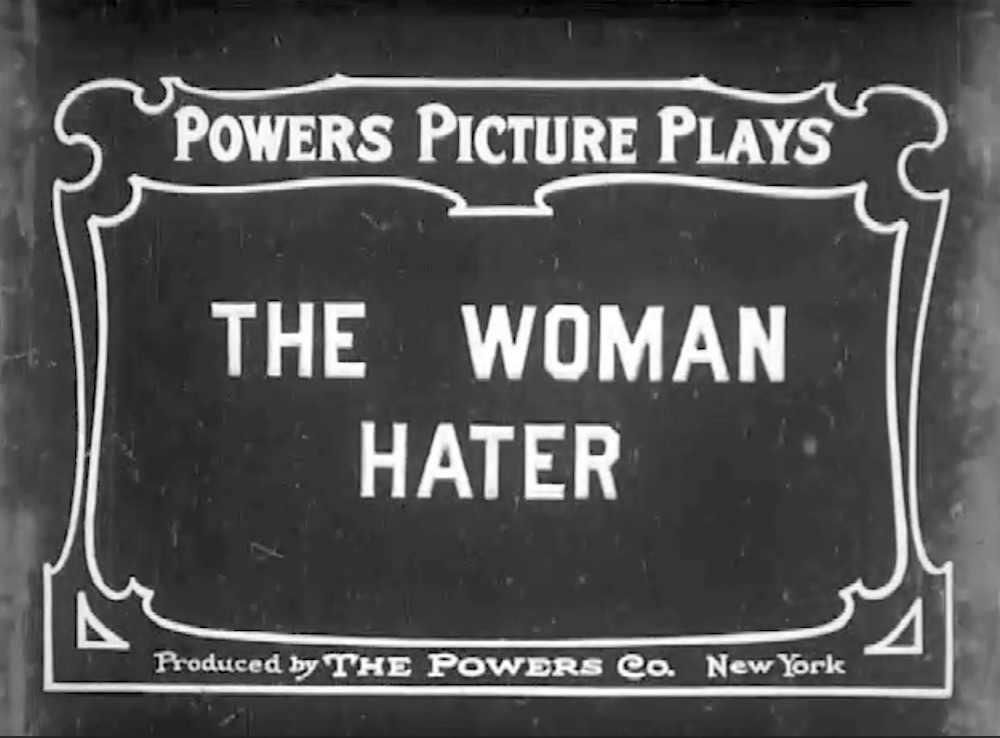
The Woman Hater title card

In 1910 the Powers Company changed its name to Powers Picture Plays, and Joseph A. Golden was one of its first directors.

In 1911 it announced an adaptation of Gunga Din from the Rudyard Kipling poem, a production titled The Awakening of Galatea from "the story of Pygmalion's Strange Love", and Nat M. Wills in a "Happy Tramp" comedy film.

In 1912, Powers Picture merged to form Universal Pictures. Universal was formed in 1912 by the emergence of the Rex Film Company, American division of Éclair, Nestor Film Company, Powers Picture Plays, The Champion Film Company, Yankee Film Company (that quickly evolved into the Independent Moving Pictures Company (IMP), and New York Motion Picture Company. Even after 1912, Powers Picture films were still being credited but were distributed by Universal. Mexican Border Defenders was shot in New Mexico in 1912. It was filmed in New Mexico.

== Filmography ==
- The Woman Hater (1910)
- Only the Master Shall Judge (1911), a drama
- Summer Madness, a comedy
- The Question, a drama
- When Pals Quarrel
- The Love Potion, a comedy
- The Haunted Island (1911), about a ship's passengers who become stranded on an island
- The Love Tyrant
- How Aunty Was Fooled
- Nat Willis as King of Kazam (1911)
- A Moral Coward
- Little Girl
- Oh! Baby!, a comedy
- The Thrilling Powers Fire
- The Picnic, a comedy
- A Foot Romance
- Speculation
- Cheyenne Days, a scenic film
- A Harmless Flirtation
- Lone Eagle's Trust
- Babes in the Woods
- The Squaw's Devotion
- Measuring a Wife
- Falls of Bohemia, a scenic film
- The Indian's Love, a drama
- Lost in a Hotel (1911)
- Monte Cristo (1911)
- An Old Time Nightmare (1911)
- Red Star's Honor (1911)
- Gray Wolf's Grief (1911)
- The Horse Thief (1911)
- The Last of the Mohicans (1911), an adaptation of The Last of the Mohicans
- Mexican Border Defenders (1912)
- Into the Lion's Pit (1914)
- When Little Lindy Sang (1916)
- A Montana Love Story
- Home Sweet Home
- When Masons Meet
- The Bandit's Surprise
- A Famble with Love
- Come Back to Erin
- His Mind's Tragedy
- Just Kids
- A Trip About Christiana (1911)
- Ogallalah
- The Boy From the East
- The Pantaloon Skirt
- A Western Ruse
- Cupid's Monkey Wrench
- Oh! You Mother in Law
- Touring Athens
- A Western Ruse
- How the Doctor Made Good
- Reclamation
- At the Window
