= Any Wife =

1922 film by Herbert Brenon

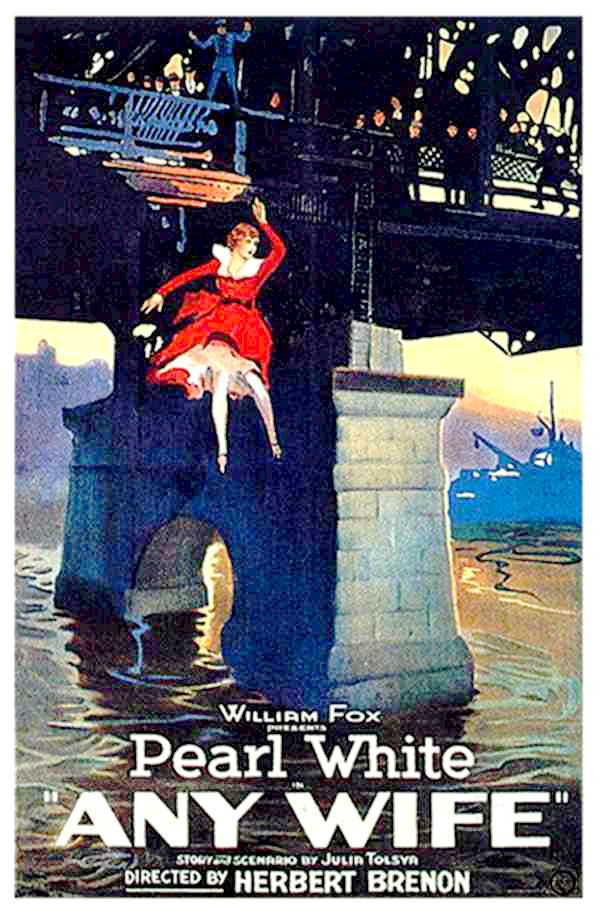
- Film poster
- Directed by: Herbert Brenon
- Written by: Julia Tolsva (story & scenario)
- Produced by: William Fox
- Starring: Pearl White
- Cinematography: Tom Malloy
- Distributed by: Fox Film Corporation
- Release date: January 22, 1922
- Running time: 50 mins.; 5 reels
- Country: United States
- Language: Silent (English intertitles)

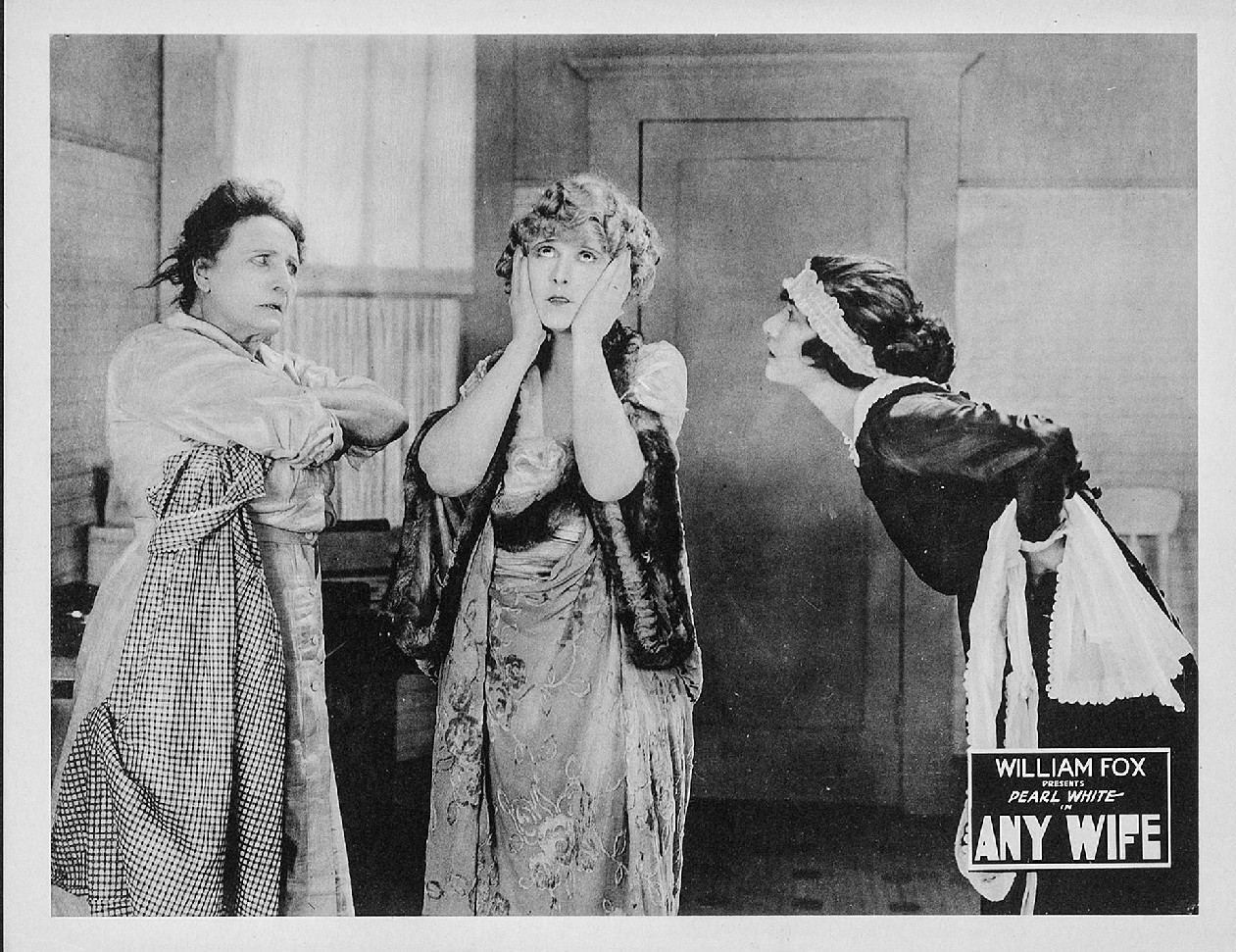
Lobby card

Any Wife is a lost 1922 American silent melodrama film directed by Herbert Brenon and starring Pearl White. It was produced and distributed by Fox Film Corporation.

== Plot ==
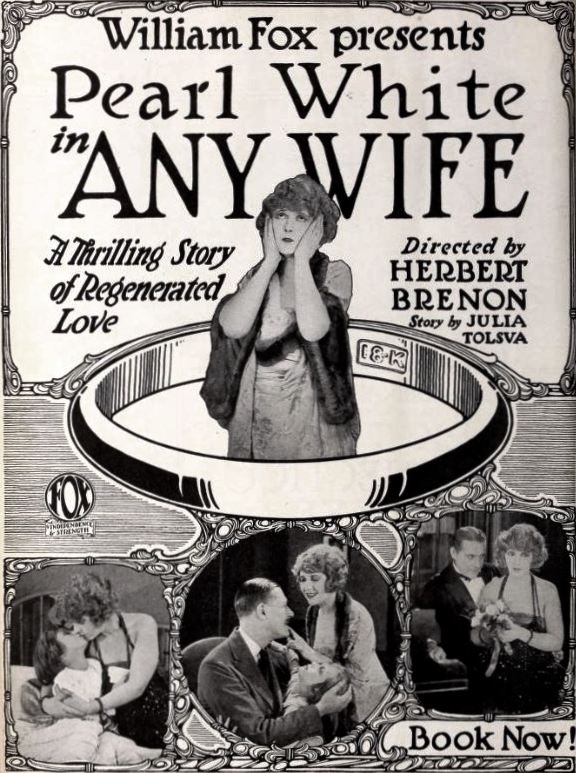
Any Wife 1922 ad

As described in a film magazine, Myrtle Hill is the wife of John Hill, a successful contractor who, because of his devotion to his work, he neglects his wife. He has to make a hurried business trip to San Francisco and wants his wife and child to accompany him. After debating the matter, the wife falls asleep and dreams that she has divorced her husband and married a draftsman. He mistreats her and casts her off for an actress. The actress, sympathizing with her, brings the wife face-to-face with this husband, but he turns against her. She attempts suicide by jumping from a high bridge into the water, but then wakes up with her hand in an aquarium. She hurriedly dresses and together with her little boy Cyril accompanies her husband on his trip.

== Cast ==
- Pearl White as Myrtle Hill
- Holmes Herbert as Philip Gray
- Gilbert Emery as Mr. John Hill
- Lawrence Johnson as Cyril Hill
- Augustus Balfour as Dr. Gaynor
- Eulalie Jensen as Louise Farrata
