= The Money Maniac =

1921 film by Léonce Perret

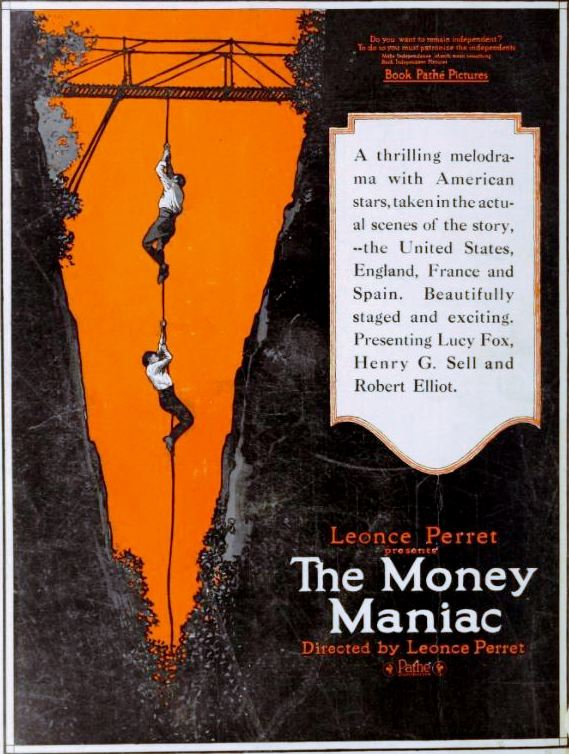
- Directed by: Léonce Perret
- Written by: Louis Létang (novel); Léonce Perret
- Produced by: Léonce Perret
- Starring: Robert Elliott; Henry G. Sell; Marcya Capri
- Cinematography: René Guissart; Jacques Montéran
- Production company: Léonce Perret Productions
- Distributed by: Pathé Exchange
- Release date: July 1921
- Running time: 50 minutes
- Country: United States
- Languages: Silent; English intertitles

The Money Maniac is a 1921 American silent drama film directed by Léonce Perret and starring Robert Elliott, Henry G. Sell and Marcya Capri.

== Plot ==
The story begins with Joe Hoggart, who convinces a group of immigrants to pool their savings to purchase a tract of land. Years later, the land proves to be rich in oil. With the help of his associate Bill Shopps, Joe devises a scheme to seek control of the other investors' certificates. He travels to Spain where he learns that a partner named Garros, has died. He kidnaps Garros's daughter, Rolande, claiming she has also died. Didier Bouchard, another member of the group, gathers the partners and their descendants to protect their interests. Joe lures them into a secluded building when a sale of the land takes place. Joe imprisons them, then they make a daring escape to arrive in time for the sale. Investor Milo d'espail discovers that Rolande is still alive and rescues her from Joe. Bouchard marries Thérèse, another of Garros's daughters.

== Cast ==
- Robert Elliott as Didier Bouchard
- Henry G. Sell as Milo d'Espail
- Marcya Capri as Rolande Garros
- Lucy Fox as Thérèse Garros
- Ivo Dawson as Joe Hoggart
- Eugène Bréon as Bill Shopps

== Bibliography ==
- Larry Langman. Destination Hollywood: The Influence of Europeans on American Filmmaking. McFarland, 2000.
