= Oh, Whiskers! =

- Directed by: Phillips Smalley
- Produced by: Crystal Film Company
- Starring: Pearl White
- Distributed by: Universal Film Manufacturing Company
- Release date: May 4, 1913
- Running time: 2 reels
- Country: USA
- Language: Silent..English intertitles

Oh, Whiskers! is a 1913 silent short film directed by Phillips Smalley and starring Pearl White. It was produced by the Crystal Film Company and released through Universal Film Manufacturing Company. It was released in split-reel for with Pearl as a Detective.

The film is preserved at the Library of Congress.

== Cast ==
- Pearl White - Miss Hegg
- Chester Barnett - The Barber
- Joseph Belmont - Baldwin
