= The Challenge Accepted =

1918 silent film

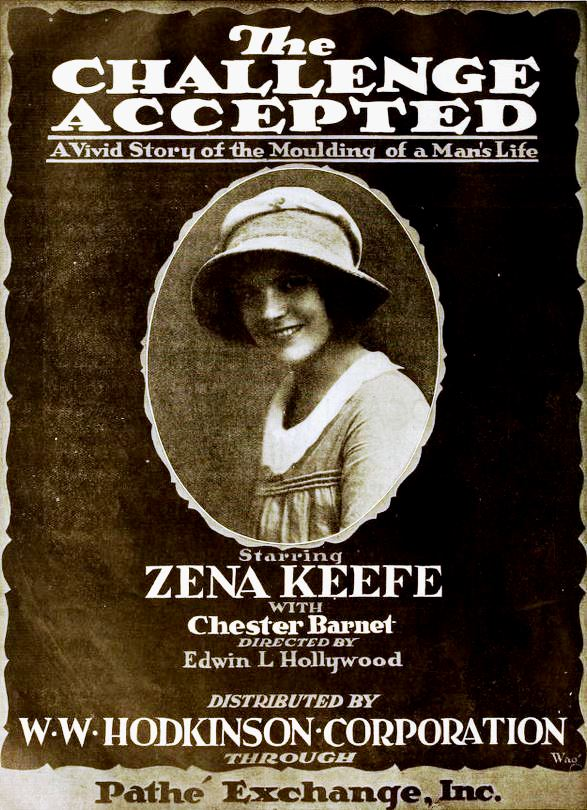
- Directed by: Edwin L. Hollywood
- Written by: Donald Gordon Reid
- Starring: Zena Keefe; Charles Eldridge; Russell Simpson
- Cinematography: Charles W. Hoffman
- Production company: Arden Photoplays
- Distributed by: Hodkinson Pictures; Pathe Exchange
- Release date: December 29, 1918
- Running time: 50 minutes
- Country: United States
- Languages: Silent; English intertitles

The Challenge Accepted is a 1918 American silent drama film directed by Edwin L. Hollywood and starring Zena Keefe, Charles Eldridge and Russell Simpson.

== Cast ==
- Zena Keefe as Sally Haston
- Charles Eldridge as John Haston
- Russell Simpson as Uncle Zeke Sawyer
- Chester Barnett as Steve Carey
- Joel Day as Tom Carey
- Sidney D'Albrook as Billy Murphy
- Jack Hopkins as James Grogan
- Warren Cook as Captain Roderick Brooke

== Bibliography ==
- George A. Katchmer. Eighty Silent Film Stars: Biographies and Filmographies of the Obscure to the Well Known. McFarland, 1991.
