= A Man of Stone =

1921 film directed by George Archainbaud

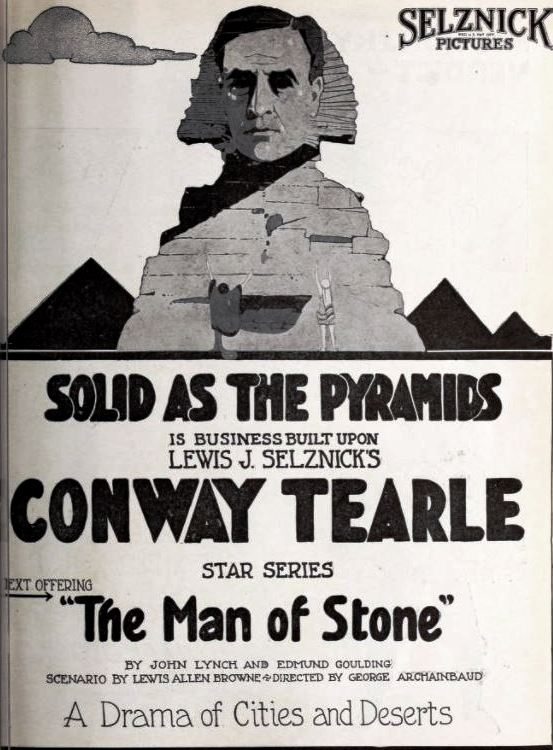
- Directed by: George Archainbaud
- Written by: Lewis Allen Browne; Edmund Goulding; John Lynch
- Produced by: Lewis J. Selznick
- Starring: Conway Tearle; Betty Howe; Martha Mansfield
- Cinematography: Jules Cronjager
- Production company: Selznick Pictures
- Distributed by: Select Pictures
- Release date: November 10, 1921
- Running time: 50 minutes
- Country: United States
- Language: Silent (English intertitles)

A Man of Stone is a 1921 American silent drama film directed by George Archainbaud and starring Conway Tearle, Betty Howe, and Martha Mansfield.

== Plot ==
As described in a film magazine, after returning to London, Captain Deering (Tearle) of the British army finds that, during his absence from England, his fiancée Lady Fortescue (Mansfield) has jilted him for Lord Reggie (Brown). Stung with mortification, he accepts service in the Arabian Desert and is attracted to a pretty young Arabian woman Laila (Howe), who nurses him through a fever when he becomes ill. Lady Fortescue has a change of heart and arrives as the desert camp while Captain Deering is absent. She tells Laila that she is Deering's wife. Laila leaves the camp and is attacked by a marauding band. Captain Deering and his troops rescue Laila, and there is a promise of continued happiness between them.

== Cast ==
- Conway Tearle as Capt. Deering
- Betty Howe as Laila
- Martha Mansfield as Lady Fortescue
- Colin Campbell as Lt. Waite
- Warren Cook as Lord Branton
- Charles D. Brown as Lord Reggie
- Henry Kolker (uncredited)

== Bibliography ==
- Matthew Kennedy. Edmund Goulding's Dark Victory: Hollywood's Genius Bad Boy. Terrace Books, 2004.
