= Betty Howe =

American actress

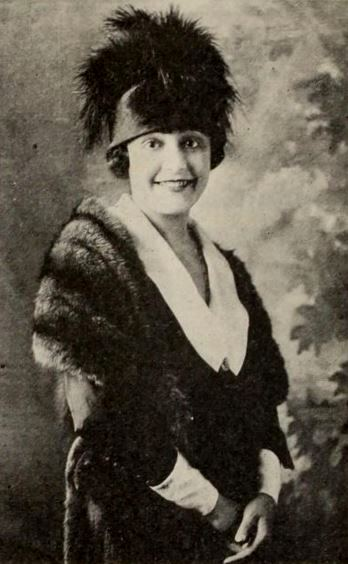
- Betty Howe, from a 1918 publication.
- Born: May 23, 1895; New York, New York
- Died: June 21, 1969; New York, New York
- Occupation: Actress

Betty Howe (May 23, 1895 – June 21, 1969) was an American actress in silent films.

== Early life ==
Howe was born in New York City, and attended Chappaqua Mountain Institute, a Quaker school.

== Career ==
With "no stage experience," Howe joined Vitagraph Studios as a stock player in 1916. In 1918, she and Canadian actor Edward Earle formed the Earle-Howe production company within Vitagraph. She appeared in silent films, including Mr. Jack, a Hallroom Hero (1916, short), Mr. Jack Trifles (1916, short), Mr. Jack Hires a Stenographer (1916, short), Fathers of Men (1916), The Alibi (1916), Beatrice Fairfax (1916, serial), The Scarlet Runner (1916), For France (1917), The Blind Adventure (1918), The Lie (1918), To Hell with the Kaiser! (1918), Wolves of Kultur (1918), As a Man Thinks (1919), The Woman of His Dream (1921), A Man of Stone (1921), and Breaking Home Ties (1922).

== Personal life ==
Howe died in New York City in 1969, aged 74 years.
