= An Innocent Bridegroom =

An Innocent Bride
- Directed by: Phillips Smalley
- Produced by: Crystal Film Company
- Starring: Pearl White
- Distributed by: Universal Film Manufacturing Company
- Release date: March 1913
- Running time: short film
- Country: USA

An Innocent Bridegroom is a 1913 silent short film directed by Phillips Smalley and starring Pearl White. It was released as a split-reel program along with A Night in the Town. Both films survive in the Library of Congress collection.

== Cast ==
- Pearl White
- Chester Barnett
- Joseph Belmont
