= Public Be Damned =

1917 film directed by Stanner E.V. Taylor

- Directed by: Stanner E.V. Taylor
- Written by: Stanner E.V. Taylor
- Starring: Mary Fuller; Charles Richman; Chester Barnett
- Production company: Public Rights Film
- Distributed by: Select Pictures
- Release date: July 2, 1917
- Running time: 60 minutes
- Country: United States
- Languages: Silent; English intertitles

Public Be Damned is a 1917 American silent drama film directed by Stanner E.V. Taylor and starring Mary Fuller, Charles Richman and Chester Barnett. The film's negative portrayal of food hoarding at a time of increased shortages due to the American entry into World War I led to it being publicly endorsed by Herbert Hoover, who shot a prologue to introduce the film. It was followed shortly afterwards by a similarly-themed production The Food Gamblers by Allan Dwan.

== Cast ==
- Mary Fuller as Marion Fernley
- Charles Richman as John Black
- Chester Barnett as Robert Merritt
- Joseph W. Smiley as Bill Garvin
- Russell Bassett as David Higgins
- Herbert Hoover as himself

== Bibliography ==
- Frederic Lombardi. Allan Dwan and the Rise and Decline of the Hollywood Studios. McFarland, 2013.
