= Pearl as a Detective =

- Directed by: Phillips Smalley
- Produced by: Crystal Film Company
- Starring: Pearl White
- Distributed by: Universal Film Manufacturing Company
- Release date: May 4, 1913
- Running time: 2 reels
- Country: USA
- Language: Silent..English titles

Pearl as a Detective is a 1913 silent short film comedy directed by Phillips Smalley and starring Pearl White. It was released as a split-reel with Oh, Whiskers!. It's preserved in the Library of Congress collection.

== Cast ==
- Pearl White - Pearl
- Chester Barnett - Chester
- Grace Darling - Grace
