= Blanche Auzello =

French-American resistance fighter

Blanche Auzello (née Rubenstein; c. 1897–1969) was a French American who ran the Hôtel Ritz Paris with her husband. She relayed messages for the French Resistance during the Nazi occupation of Paris. She acted in silent films in the United States before leaving for Paris with her friend, fellow actor Pearl White. In Paris, she married Claude Auzello who later became the manager of the Ritz. She was imprisoned and interrogated at the Fresnes Prison during the resistance. Her husband shot her in a murder–suicide in 1969.

== Early life and acting ==
Blanche Rubenstein was born around 1897 in Manhattan, New York, the youngest of German-Jewish immigrants Sara and Isaac Rubenstein's seven children. Her brother Sylvester sold films and introduced her to the Pathé movie studio. She acted in a handful of silent films, including the serials of the actress Pearl White.

Rubenstein became friends with White and they both travelled to France in 1923 where White hoped to reboot her acting career. Blanche went to Paris, intending to meet a lover, J'Ali Ledene, a wealthy Egyptian prince.

== Life in Paris ==
On her first night in Paris, Blanche met Claude Auzello, the assistant manager at their hotel. She married him around 1924. While he kept a mistress, she would meet up with J'Ali Ledene. Claude later became the assistant manager at the Hôtel Ritz Paris. The Ritz had a quota for Jewish people, so Blanche converted to Christianity. During the 1920s and 1930s, she assisted Claude in managing the hotel, building relationships with the employees and anticipating the guests' needs. He was promoted to manager in the mid-1930s. She later recollected that "the hotel was an incredible place...the men stood out, sharp, brilliant, the women were beautiful, and everybody was rich."

In 1939, with World War II impending, Auzello resisted her husband's urging that she return to the United States. During the Nazi occupation of Paris, German soldiers took over the Ritz. Claude relayed information he had overheard to the French Resistance. Blanche was friends with Lily Kharmayeff, a member of the French underground, and acted as a messenger for the resistance. Blanche was captured and imprisoned on more than one occasion. She was sent to the Fresnes Prison where she was imprisoned for a month, enduring interrogations and isolation.

During the 1960s, Blanche had fainting spells. On 29 May 1969, in the 8th arrondissement of Paris, Auzello was shot to death by her husband, who then shot himself.

== Fictional accounts ==
Auzello's nephew, Samuel Marx, wrote a semi-fictional biography of her in 1978 entitled Queen of the Ritz. The portrayal of Auzello's friendship with Pearl White was criticised for being "entirely fictional, including invented conversations and alleged incidents totally out of keeping with the actual chronology of events."

Auzello's involvement at the Ritz was recounted in Tilar Mazzeo's 2014 book The Hotel on Place Vendôme. She was fictionalised in the 2019 Melanie Benjamin novel Mistress of the Ritz.

Blanche Auzello is one of the main characters in the novel Le Barman du Ritz (ISBN 978-2226479938), by French writer Philippe Collin, published in April 2024 by Albin Michel, a well-researched fictionalised account of life in the Ritz under German occupation of Paris (1940–1944). The central character is the eponymous barman, Frank Meier, who secretly loves Blanche and (in the book) procured her fake papers.
