= Everyman's Price =

1921 film directed by Burton L. King

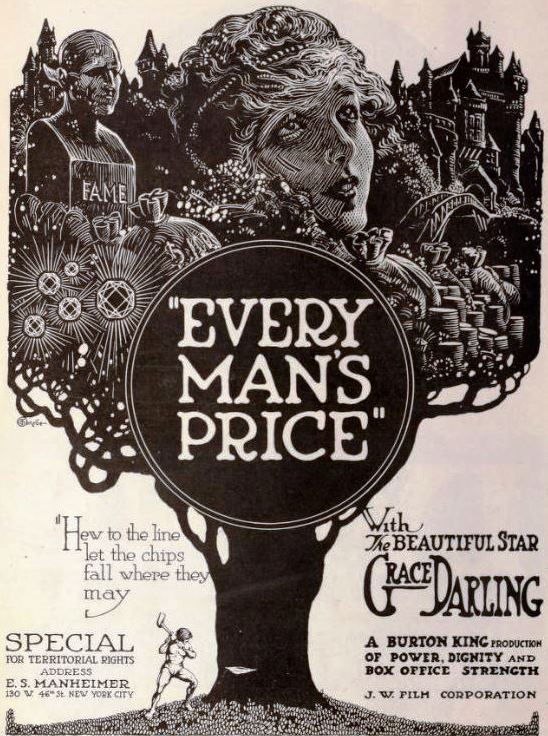
- Directed by: Burton L. King
- Written by: F. McGrew Willis
- Produced by: Burton L. King
- Starring: Grace Darling; Bud Geary; Nita Naldi
- Cinematography: L.D. Littlefield
- Production company: Burton King Productions
- Distributed by: J.W. Film Corporation
- Release date: October 14, 1921
- Running time: 50 minutes
- Country: United States
- Languages: Silent; English intertitles

Everyman's Price is a 1921 American silent comedy film directed by Burton L. King and starring Grace Darling, Bud Geary and Nita Naldi.

== Cast ==
- Grace Darling as Ethel Armstrong
- E.J. Ratcliffe as Henry Armstrong
- Charles Waldron as Bruce Steele
- Bud Geary as Jim Steele
- Nita Naldi

== Bibliography ==
- Munden, Kenneth White. The American Film Institute Catalog of Motion Pictures Produced in the United States, Part 1. University of California Press, 1997.
