= The Woman Hater (1910 Thanhouser film) =

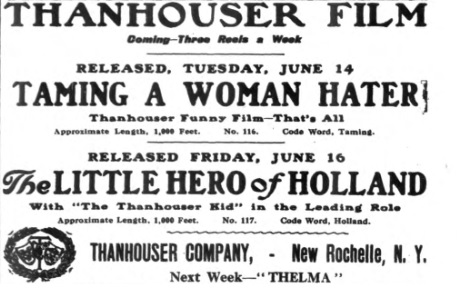
- Advertisement for the film in The New York Dramatic Mirror
- Written by: Lloyd Lonergan
- Produced by: Thanhouser Company
- Release date: June 14, 1910
- Country: United States
- Languages: Silent film English intertitles

The Woman Hater is a 1910 American silent short drama produced by the Thanhouser Company. The film focuses on Tom Taylor, a woman-hater, who sells his property to a financier at a play. In order to finalize the transaction, Taylor must go to the financier's hotel and becomes the subject of a bet by Lou Bennett that she can win his affections. Lou succeeds in the bet, but Taylor finds out and is preparing to leave forever when Lou speaks to him. Little is known about the production or the cast other than a single credit of Violet Heming as Lou Bennett. The film was released on June 14, 1910, but is not known to have been reviewed by any trade publications. The film is presumed lost, but another production of the same name released the same year was rediscovered in New Zealand in 2010.

== Plot ==
Though the film is presumed lost, a synopsis was published in The Moving Picture World on June 18, 1910. It states: "Tom Taylor, the owner of a pretty rustic cottage, where he lives all alone, believes himself to be a woman hater, and reproaches his friend John Sparks, when the latter tries to ornament the cottage with posters of women. Taylor's property is valuable, and at the opening of the play a financier purchases it at a satisfactory figure. To close the deal, Taylor is obliged to go to the financier's hotel, and there he attracts the attention of four pretty young girl guests. One of them, Lou Bennett (played by Violet Heming), asks John to introduce Tom. This John declines to do on the grounds that Tom is a woman hater. Lou bets the other girls that she can make Tom fall in love with her and propose to her within a week. They take the bet, not knowing Tom's name or where he lives. They follow his horse, borrowing a carriage built for two, that is waiting outside the hotel. Lou meets Tom, and wins her bet - he falls in love with her. But, incidentally, the girl loses her own heart. Tom finds that he has been tricked, and is preparing to go away forever, when Lou arrives, speaks with him, and all ends nicely."

== Production ==
The writer of the scenario was Lloyd Lonergan. Lonergan was an experienced newspaperman employed by The New York Evening World while writing scripts for the Thanhouser productions. He was the most important script writer for Thanhouser, averaging 200 scripts a year from 1910 to 1915. The film director is unknown, but it may have been Barry O'Neil. Film historian Q. David Bowers does not attribute a cameraman for this production, but two possible candidates exist. Blair Smith was the first cameraman of the Thanhouser company, but he was soon joined by Carl Louis Gregory who had years of experience as a still and motion picture photographer. The role of the cameraman was uncredited in 1910 productions.

Only one credit for the film is known: Violet Heming as Lou Bennett. The other members cast in the production are unknown, but the cast may have included the leading players of the Thanhouser productions, Anna Rosemond and Frank H. Crane. Rosemond was one of two leading ladies for the first year of the company. Crane was also involved in the very beginnings of the Thanhouser Company and acted in numerous productions before becoming a director at Thanhouser.

== Release ==
The single reel drama, approximately 1000 feet in length, was released on June 14, 1910. Theater advertisements for the film were found in newspapers in Indiana, Pennsylvania, Maryland, and Ohio. The film was alternatively known and advertised as Taming a Woman Hater. One theater in Pennsylvania would advertise Thanhouser's Jane Eyre as a magnificent and costly production and follow it up with The Woman Hater with the generic advertisement promotion that it was a great film. It is unknown if published trade reviews for this work exist, but there is an absence of a citation Bowers. Given this absence, it is possible that additional details or commentary can be obtained from advertisements or local newspapers outside of typical trade publications. The film was labeled a comedy in an advertisement, using the name Taming a Woman Hater in The New York Dramatic Mirror on June 18, 1910.

Identification of the film in showings and reviews is complicated by the existence of Pat Power's The Woman Hater. Though it bears the same name, the film was released on November 26, 1910. It was the Powers film that was rediscovered in New Zealand in 2010.

== See also ==
- List of American films of 1910
