= To Hell with the Kaiser! =

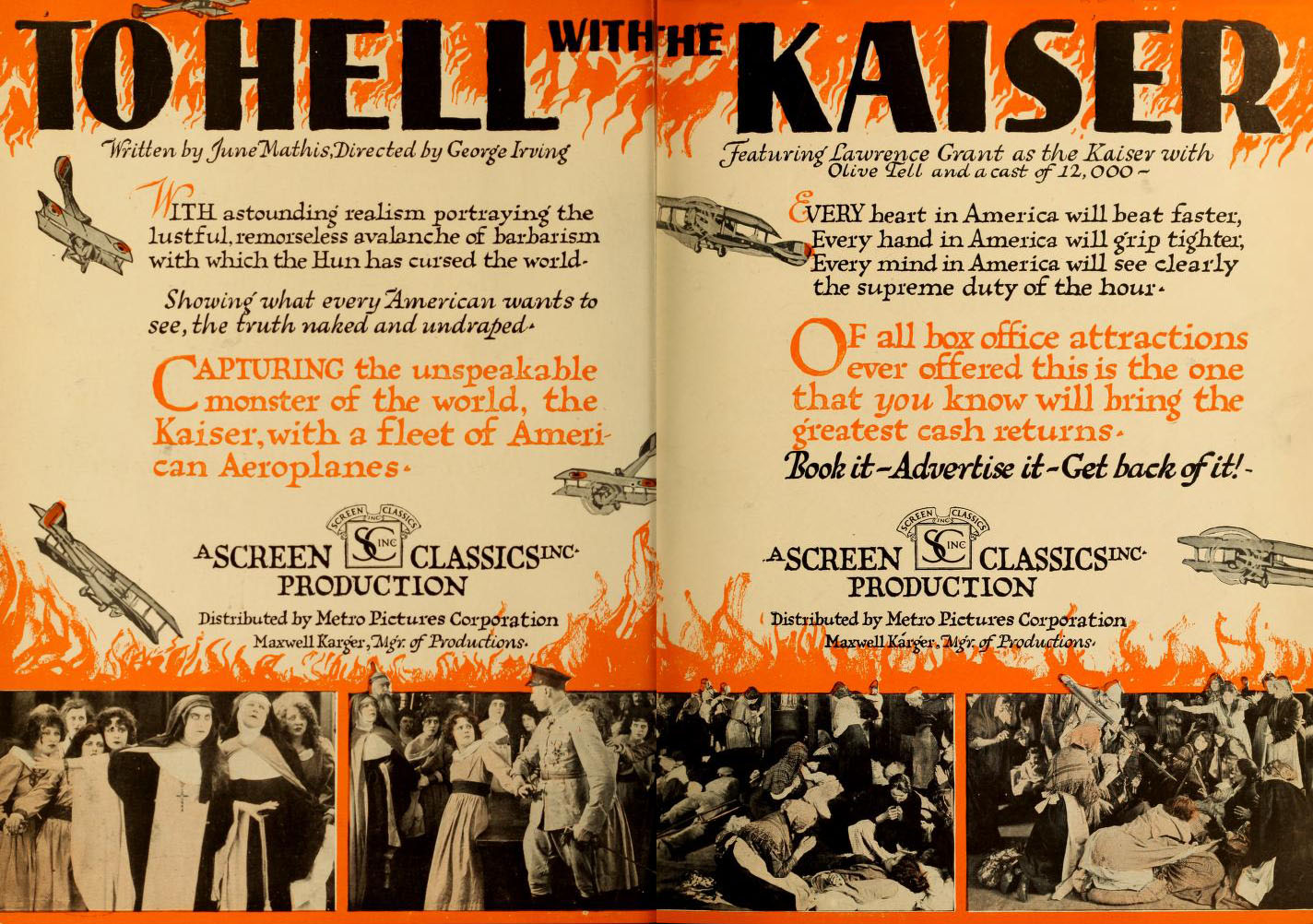
- Advertisement (1918)
- Directed by: George Irving
- Written by: June Mathis (scenario)
- Produced by: Screen Classics; Maxwell Karger
- Starring: Lawrence Grant
- Cinematography: George K. Hollister
- Production company: Screen Classics Inc.
- Distributed by: Metro Pictures
- Release date: June 30, 1918
- Running time: 70 minutes; 7 reels
- Country: United States
- Language: Silent (English intertitles)

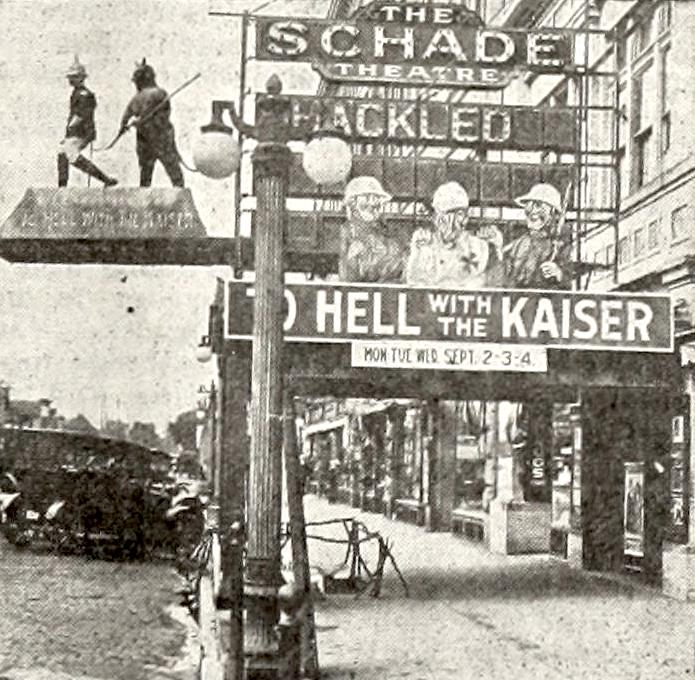
A theater showing the film in 1918.

To Hell with the Kaiser! is a lost 1918 American silent Great War propaganda comedy film produced by Screen Classics Productions and distributed by Metro Pictures. It was directed by George Irving and starred Lawrence Grant as the Kaiser.

Made toward the close of World War I, this film falls in line with other films of this popular genre, the wartime propaganda film, made at the same time i.e. The Kaiser, Beast of Berlin, The Prussian Cur, The Claws of the Hun, Yankee Doodle in Berlin, Civilization, Hearts of the World, The Heart of Humanity, Over the Rhine, The False Faces, The Unpardonable Sin, My Four Years in Germany, and The Sinking of the Lusitania to name a few.

== Plot ==
Lawrence Grant, who spent his lengthy career playing odious villains, appeared in the dual role of Kaiser Wilhelm II and his look-alike, German actor Robert Graubel. Terrified of being assassinated, the Kaiser hires Graubel to impersonate him at various political functions.

In the film, the Kaiser achieves military success through an infernal pact with Satan. Once this is established, the film concentrates on the seemingly endless tally of misdeeds perpetrated by the Kaiser during his quarter-century reign over Germany. His "partner in crime" is Wilhelm, German Crown Prince (Earl Schenck), who thinks nothing of casually raping convent girls and gunning down protesting nuns.

The Crown Prince's latest conquest is Ruth Monroe (Betty Howe), the daughter of an American inventor. When Ruth's father protests this outrage, he is brutally murdered, whereupon Ruth's sister Alice (Olive Tell) vows revenge. Using her father's newest invention, a wireless machine whose coded messages cannot be intercepted, Alice directs a battalion of planes to bomb the small German village where the Kaiser is hiding. Captured by the Allies, the Kaiser is ignominiously dumped in a POW camp, but not before enduring a well-aimed sock on the jaw from a pugnacious doughboy. In despair, the Kaiser commits suicide and sends his soul to hell. In hell, the devil (Walter P. Lewis) gives up his throne, confessing that the Kaiser is far more sinister than he could ever hope to be.

== Cast ==
- Lawrence Grant as The Kaiser / Robert Graubel
- Olive Tell as Alice Monroe
- Betty Howe as Ruth Monroe
- John Sunderland as Winslow Dodge
- Earl Schenck as Crown Prince
- Mabel Wright as Empress
- Frank Currier as Professor Monroe
- Karl Dane as Von Hollweg
- Walter P. Lewis as Satan
- Henry Carvill as Bismarck
- Charles Harley as Count Zeppelin
- Emil Hoch as Von Hindenburg
- George S. Trimble as Von Tirpitz
- Frank Farrington as General Pershing
- William J. Gross as Councillor
- May McAvoy as Wounded Girl
- Maude Hill as Mother Superior
- P. Reybo as Von Mackenson
- Allan Walker
- Margaret McWade
- Marian Stewart
- Bertha Willsea
- Maurine Powers
- Gustav von Seyffertitz

== Reception ==
Like many American films of the time, To Hell with the Kaiser! was subject to restrictions and cuts by city and state film censorship boards. For example, the Chicago Board of Censors cut, in Reel 2, the intertitle "Give the men free reign [sic] — you know what that means", Reel 3, the three intertitles "These quarters are not so bad — all but the girls, of course", "I'll take the first choice", and "Morning — the lust of the war gods", and, Reel 5, the intertitle "You came here willingly" etc.

== Preservation ==
With no holdings located in archives, To Hell with the Kaiser! is considered a lost film.
