= Beatrice Fairfax =

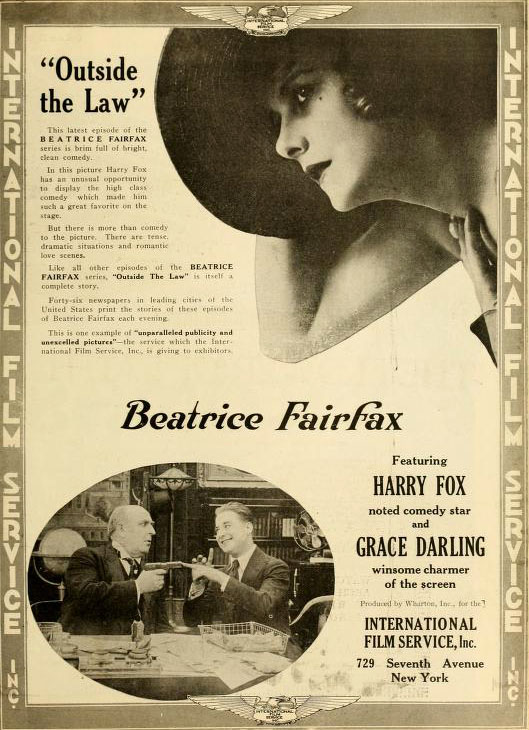
- Advertisement for Episode 9
- Written by: Basil Dickey (scenario)
- Produced by: Leopold Wharton; Theodore Wharton
- Starring: Grace Darling; Harry Fox
- Cinematography: Levi Bacon; John K. Holbrook; William Plyes; Lew Tree
- Distributed by: International Film Service; Wharton
- Release date: August 7, 1916
- Running time: 300 mins. (15 episodes)
- Country: United States
- Languages: Silent; English intertitles

Beatrice Fairfax is an American silent film serial directed and produced by Leopold Wharton and Theodore Wharton. First released on August 7, 1916, the series consists of 15 weekly episodes and features the character of "Beatrice Fairfax" (Grace Darling). The character was inspired by the popular newspaper advice column Ask Beatrice Fairfax, which had been the world's first column of its kind when launched in 1898.

The weekly film serial was a popular genre of the time, and the films' producers, the Wharton brothers, also made serials such as The Exploits of Elaine. However, Beatrice Fairfax is more accurately a series, since the episodes consist of self-contained stories rather than a linked serial narrative.

== Overview ==
The two protagonists were played by Grace Darling and Harry Fox, the comedian and vaudeville dancer. In the films, the Beatrice character was portrayed as a resourceful agony aunt-cum-crimefighter, working with her reporter colleague Jimmy Barton to investigate and solve the problems sent in by her troubled readers.

== Cast ==
- Grace Darling: Beatrice Fairfax (All episodes)
- Harry Fox: Jimmy Barton (All episodes)
- Betty Howe: Dorothy McRay/Jean Moore/Margaret Payne/Jane Hamlin/Alice Masters
- Nigel Barrie: Donald Jordan/Bert Kerrigan/Jane Hamlin's Boyfriend/Hanson
- Bessie Wharton: Madame Laurette/Mrs. Raven/Mrs. Malone/Mrs. Ainsley/Old Woman (Episode 12)
- George Connor: George McCabe/San De Fargo (Episode 1)/John Miles/Crook in Derby (Episode 12)/Sam
- Allan Murnane: Waldo Conley/Robert Wells
- Wellington Playter: David/Clinton Harding
- Evelyn Farris: Gladys Hanson/Dorothy Dane
- F.W. Stewart: Pete Raven/James Wells
- Mae Hopkins: Martha Ainsley/Madeline Grey
- Elsie Baker: Marie Bocetti/Anna Cortes/Maid
- Maurice Bond: Arturo Bocetti/Burglar (Episode 11)
- Robin H. Townley: Baby-napper (Episode 7)
- Dick Bennard: "Mme. Galliard"
- Olive Thomas: Rita Malone (Episode 10)
- M.W. Rale: Shara Ali
- Yumiko Nagahara: Mimosa San
- Mary Cranston: Madge Minturn
- Leroy Baker: Brayton
- Warner Oland: Police Commissioner
- Frances White: Principal character (Episode 1)
- Elaine Hammerstein: Secretary (Episode 14)
- Wesley Ruggles
- Bruce McRae

== Episodes ==
- Episode 1: The Missing Watchman (August 7, 1916)
- Episode 2: The Jealous Wife (August 14, 1916)
- Episode 3: Billy's Romance (August 21, 1916)
- Episode 4: The Stone God (August 28, 1916)
- Episode 5: Mimosa San (September 4, 1916)
- Episode 6: The Forbidden Room (September 11, 1916)
- Episode 7: A Name for a Baby (September 18, 1916)
- Episode 8: At the Ainsley Ball (September 25, 1916)
- Episode 9: Outside the Law (October 2, 1916)
- Episode 10: Play Ball (October 9, 1916)
- Episode 11: The Wages of Sin (October 16, 1916)
- Episode 12: Curiosity (October 23, 1916)
- Episode 13: The Ringer (October 30, 1916)
- Episode 14: The Hidden Menace (November 6, 1916)
- Episode 15: Wristwatches (November 13, 1916)
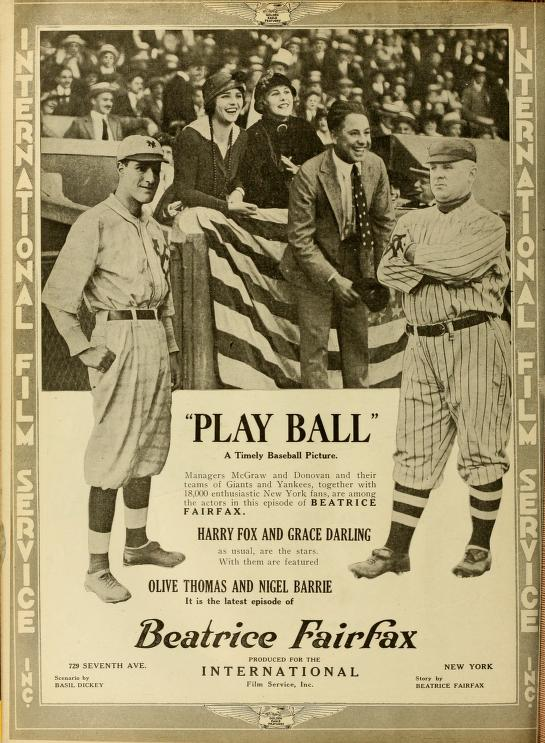
Episode 10

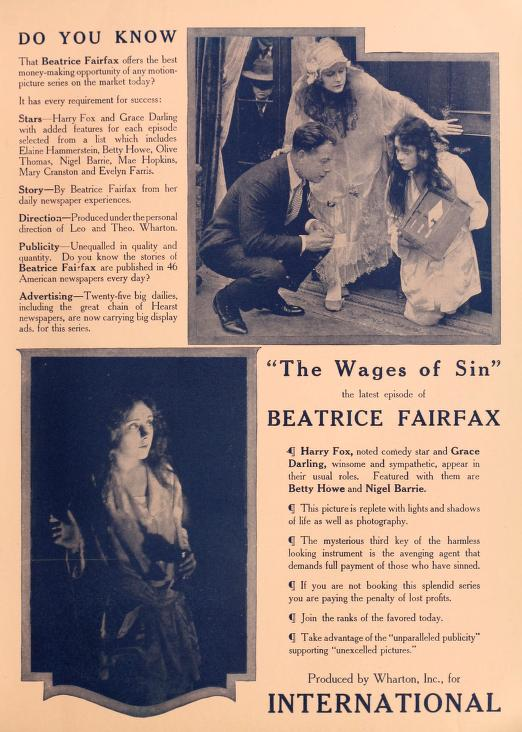
Episode 11

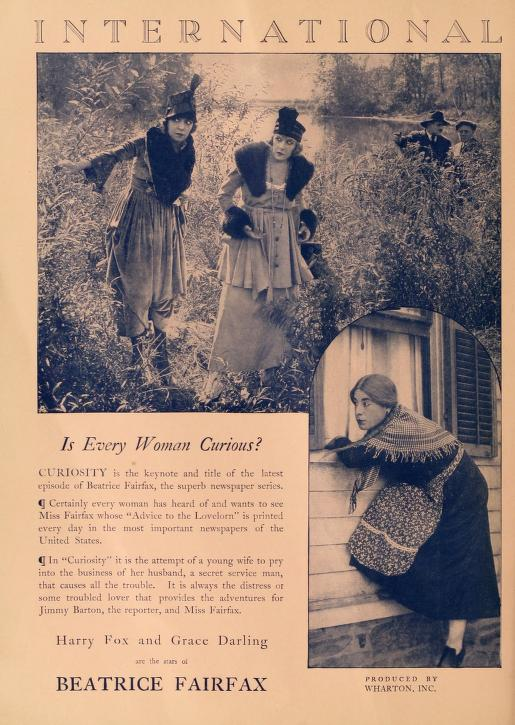
Episode 12

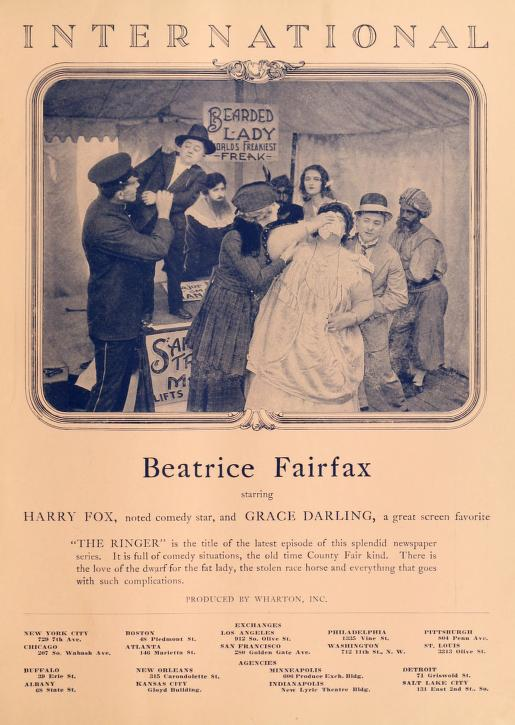
Episode 13

== Production notes ==
The episodes were filmed primarily in Ithaca, New York, at The Whartons Studio. Beatrice Fairfax marked the screen debut of Ziegfeld girl and future screen star Olive Thomas who appeared in Episode 10 of the series.

== Status ==
The Dear Beatrice Fairfax advice column was started by journalist Marie Manning on July 20, 1898, and ran in newspapers owned by William Randolph Hearst. Nitrate copies of all the episodes, except the first, survived because they were preserved in the collection of Hearst's mistress Marion Davies, which was eventually transferred to the Library of Congress. According to one source, Hearst disliked the films and planned to cast Davies as Beatrice Fairfax in a remake; he gave them to her as an example of how the new films should not be made. The films were restored and recolored according to instructions written on the nitrate copies themselves.

== DVD release ==
In 2004, Serial Squadron released the series on DVD. On September 30, 2008, Hermitage Hill Media also released the series on Region 1 DVD in the United States.

== Radio adaptation ==
Beatrice Fairfax was a program on NBC radio March 10-June 30, 1934, on CBS in May 1936 and on Mutual August 31, 1937 – February 25, 1938. The program "usually offered two love dramas and a gamut of 'heartthrob' problems each week."

== Film scores ==
Ithaca based songwriter Anna Coogan wrote and performed a filmscore and operetta for episode 7 "A Name for the Baby (or) The Curse of Eve" (2018)

== In popular culture ==
Beatrice Fairfax is featured in the lyrics to But Not for Me, a popular song of 1930 by George Gershwin.
