= Free Air (film) =

1922 silent film

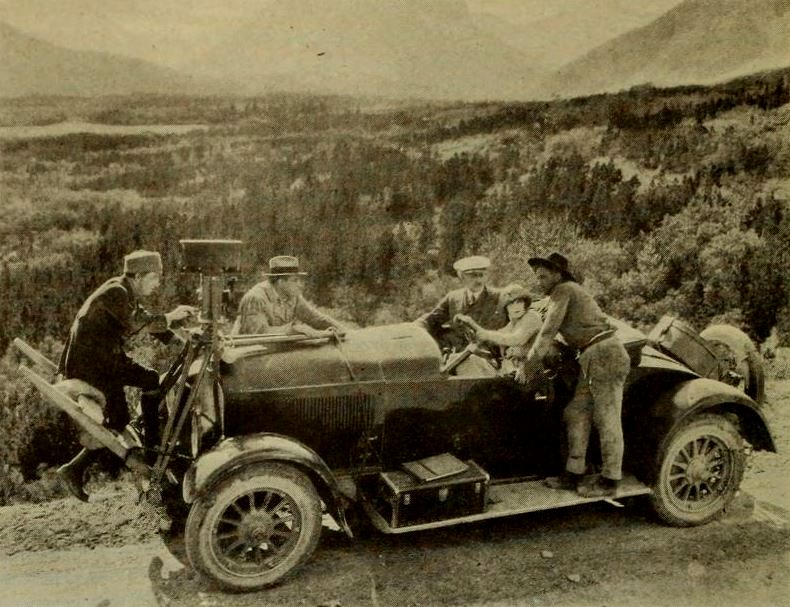
- Directed by: Edward H. Griffith
- Written by: Sinclair Lewis (novel)
- Starring: Tom Douglas; Marjorie Seaman; Henry G. Sell
- Cinematography: George Freisinger; Harold S. Sintzenich
- Production company: Outlook Photoplays
- Distributed by: W.W. Hodkinson Distribution
- Release date: April 30, 1922
- Running time: 60 minutes
- Country: United States
- Languages: Silent; English intertitles

Free Air is a 1922 American silent comedy drama film directed by Edward H. Griffith and starring Tom Douglas, Marjorie Seaman and Henry G. Sell. It is an adaptation of the 1919 novel Free Air by Sinclair Lewis.

== Cast ==
- Tom Douglas as Milt Daggett
- Marjorie Seaman as Claire Boltwood
- George Pauncefort as Henry B. Boltwood
- Henry G. Sell as Jeffrey Saxton
- Dorothy Allen as Minne Rauskekle
- Ben Hendricks Jr. as The Tramp

== Preservation ==
This film is currently lost.

== Bibliography ==
- Munden, Kenneth White. The American Film Institute Catalog of Motion Pictures Produced in the United States, Part 1. University of California Press, 1997.
