= Harry Fox =

American actor (1882–1959)

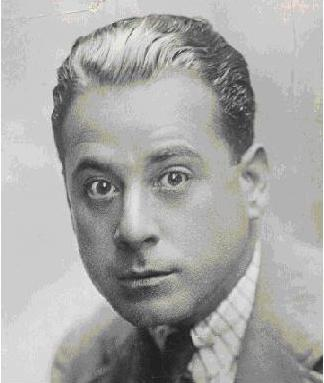
- Harry Fox, c. 1920
- Born: Arthur Carringford; May 25, 1882; Pomona, California, U.S.
- Died: July 20, 1959 (aged 77); Los Angeles, California, U.S.
- Occupations: Dancer, comedian
- Spouse: Evelyn Brent (m.1948)

Harry Fox (born Arthur Carringford; May 25, 1882 – July 20, 1959) was an American vaudeville dancer, actor, and comedian.

== Biography ==
Fox is most notably famous for being related as name-source to the Fox Trot dance in New York. In "Dance Mad" by F. Leslie Clendenen (August 15, 1914) the following appears on page 163: "FOX TROT No.2 (as danced by Mr Fox)". Harry Fox made a few recordings of popular songs and appeared in a few silent films, most notably the serial Beatrice Fairfax with Grace Darling. On Broadway in 1915, he appeared opposite Nora Bayes in the play/musical Maid in America.

In the early sound era, he made some talking short films, such as Harry Fox and His American Beauties and The Fox and the Bee (with his partner and wife Beatrice) but by the 1930s, his fame was over and he lived a life of obscurity getting work in films playing bit parts while holding a job as a tester in an aircraft plant. In the 1920s, he was married briefly to one of the famous Ziegfeld performers from The Dolly Sisters. He still was living in 1945 when the biopic The Dolly Sisters was made. The movie shows the marriage happening during World War I, a subsequent divorce, and a reunion after Jenny Dolly's accident. He was actress Evelyn Brent's third husband.

== Selected filmography ==
- Fugitive in the Sky (1936) Uncredited
- Talent Scout (1937)
