= A Night in the Town =

1913 film by Phillips Smalley

- Directed by: Phillips Smalley
- Produced by: Crystal Film Company
- Starring: Pearl White
- Distributed by: Universal Film Manufacturing Company
- Release date: March 2, 1913
- Running time: 2 reels
- Country: USA
- Language: Silent..English titles

A Night in the Town is a 1913 silent short film directed by Phillips Smalley and starring Pearl White and Chester Barnett. This film was released as a split-reel with An Innocent Bridegroom. Both films are preserved in the Library of Congress collection.

== Cast ==
- Pearl White
- Chester Barnett
