= Free Air =

1919 novel by Sinclair Lewis

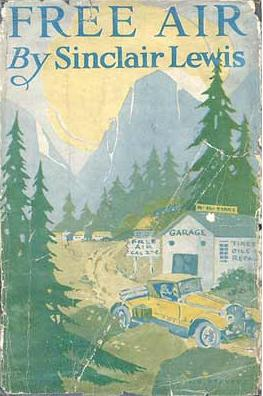
- First edition cover
- Author: Sinclair Lewis
- Language: English
- Genre: Road novel
- Publication date: 1919
- Publication place: United States
- Media type: Print (hardback & paperback)
- Pages: 370 pp

Free Air is a 1919 novel written by Sinclair Lewis. A silent film adaptation of the novel was also released on April 30, 1922. The film starred Tom Douglas as Milt Daggett and Marjorie Seaman as Claire Boltwood.

== Plot summary ==
"This cheerful little road novel, published in 1919, is about Claire Boltwood, who, in the early days of the 20th century, travels by automobile from New York City to the Pacific Northwest, where she falls in love with a nice, down-to-earth young man and gives up her snobbish Estate." (From the Book Stub)

From a critical perspective, Free Air is consistent with Sinclair Lewis's lean towards egalitarian politics, which he displays in his other works (most notably in It Can't Happen Here). Examples of his politics in Free Air are found in Lewis's emphasis on the heroic role played by the book's protagonist, Milt Dagget, a working-class everyman type. Conversely, Lewis presents nearly every upper-class character in Claire Boltwood's world (including her railroad-mogul father) as snobby elitists. The story also champions the democratic nature of the automobile versus the more aristocratic railroad travel. Lewis's emphasis on the freedom that automobiles would eventually give the working and middle classes bolsters the egalitarian, democratic aesthetic. Free Air is one of the first novels about the road trip, a subject around which the Beats (most notably Jack Kerouac) would build a cult following in the mid-20th century.

In the HBO series Boardwalk Empire, set initially in 1920, Jimmy and his girlfriend Pearl are reading Free Air. The 18-year-old Chicago prostitute Pearl hopes to head West like the heroine, along with Jimmy.

== See also ==
- Works related to Free Air at Wikisource
