= How Men Propose =

- Directed by: Lois Weber (unconfirmed) Phillips Smalley (unconfirmed)
- Written by: Lois Weber
- Produced by: Lois Weber
- Starring: Margarita Fischer; Chester Barnett; Phillips Smalley; Lois Weber
- Production company: Crystal Film Company
- Distributed by: Universal Film Manufacturing Company
- Release date: July 20, 1913
- Running time: 6 min.
- Country: United States

How Men Propose is a 1913 American silent short comedy film, usually credited to Lois Weber and Phillips Smalley as directors and to Weber as writer and producer, although their definite authorship cannot be confirmed. The film has recently not been included in Weber's filmography by scholars, and the Library of Congress, while listing it as one of Weber's films notes that "the director is unknown, but may be Lois Weber." It was produced by the Crystal Film Company and distributed by the Universal Film Manufacturing Company.

== Cast ==
- Margarita Fischer as Grace Darling (uncredited)
- Chester Barnett (uncredited)
- Phillips Smalley (uncredited)
- Lois Weber (uncredited)

== Plot ==
Three friends, without knowing it, successively propose to a woman named Grace Darling, all three receiving a photo from her as a sign of acceptance. Back at their shared apartment, the men proudly present the photos of what each of them thinks to be his future wife. Realizing that they have been duped, the men attempt to confront the woman who, in the meantime, has left her apartment, conveying through her maid a letter to each of them. The men learn that Grace Darling is a journalist writing an article on male courtship who has only been doing research on the question "how men propose".

== Trivia ==
How Men Propose is the earliest film with Margarita Fischer in a starring role that is available on DVD. The film and Fisher's performance in particular have been described as "a playful energetic assertion of female power in which Margarita [Fisher] shows herself to be a gifted actress, entirely familiar with the unique requirements of performing on film."
