= Will Power (film) =

- Directed by: Phillips Smalley
- Produced by: Crystal Film Company
- Starring: Pearl White
- Distributed by: Universal Film Manufacturing Company
- Release date: June 22, 1913
- Running time: short
- Country: USA
- Language: Silent..English titles

Will Power is a 1913 silent American short comedy film directed by Phillips Smalley and starring Pearl White.

It is preserved in the Library of Congress collection.

== Cast ==
- Pearl White - Pearl
- Chester Barnett - Chester
- Joseph Belmont - Pearl's father
