= Crystal Film Company =

Film production company

Crystal Film Company was an early film company in the United States established by Ludwig Erb. Crystal Productions made a split-reel comedy films for Universal and then United Film Service. It partnered with other producers after United folded. Joseph A. Golden partnered with Erb at Crystal.

Pearl White starred in its films. Alan E. Freedman worked for it briefly.

The studio advertised it was available for rent. Joseph A. Golden was its president.

Actress and playwright Mrs. Celie G. Turner, stage name Celie Ellis, sued the studio for an injury she sustained jumping from a branch while working at it in April 1914. She won a $4,000 verdict but it was overturned on appeal.

Hal Roach wrote to the studio.

== Films ==
- Alas, Poor Bunny (1911)
- The Bargee's Daughter (1911)
- Oh, Whiskers! (1913)
- The Mind Cure (1913), extant at the Library of Congress
- Pearl as a Detective (1913), extant
- Will Power (1913), extant
- An Innocent Bridegroom (1913), extant
- A Night in the Town (1913)
- Who is In the Box? (1913)
- Mrs. Sharp & Miss Flat (1913)
- An Hour of Terror (1913)
- The Girl Reporter (1913)
- Muchly Engaged (1913)
- True Chivalry (1913)
- Pearl's Dilemna (1913)
- Squaring Things with Wifey (1913)
- In Death's Shadow (1913)
- The Hallroom Girls (1913)
- How Men Propose (1913)
- How Moscha Came Back (1914), extant at the Library of Congress
