= The Mind Cure =

- Directed by: Phillips Smalley
- Produced by: Crystal Film Company
- Starring: Pearl White
- Distributed by: Universal Film Manufacturing Company
- Release date: December 15, 1912
- Running time: 10-12 minutes
- Country: USA
- Language: Silent film..(English)

The Mind Cure is a 1912 silent short film starring Pearl White. It was made by Crystal Film Company and is preserved at the Library of Congress. As initially released it was shown in split-reel form with another short Oh That Lemonade.

== Cast ==
- Pearl White - Pearl
- Chester Barnett - Chester, Her Beau
