= Plunder (serial) =

1923 film

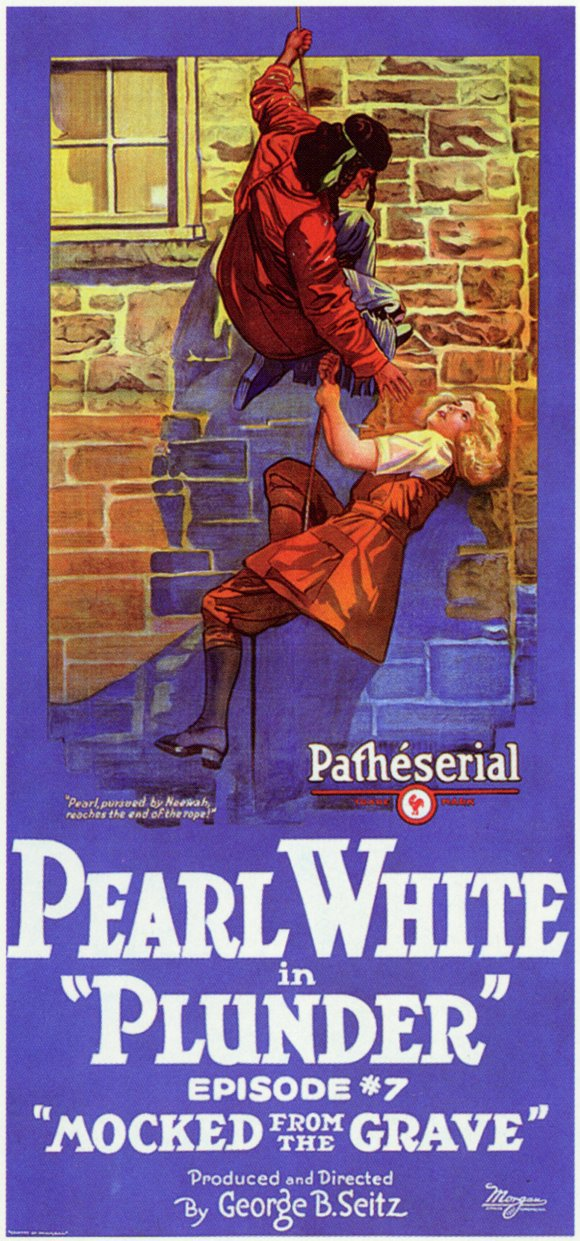
- Episode 7 poster
- Directed by: George B. Seitz
- Written by: Bertram Millhauser
- Produced by: George B. Seitz
- Starring: Pearl White; Warren William
- Distributed by: Pathé Exchange
- Release date: January 28, 1923 (United States)
- Running time: 15 episodes
- Country: United States
- Language: Silent (English intertitles)

Plunder is a 1923 American drama film serial directed by George B. Seitz. During the production of this serial, on August 10, 1922, John Stevenson, a stuntman for Pearl White, was killed doing a stunt from a moving bus to an elevated platform. The film survives in the UCLA Film and Television Archive and a trailer is preserved at the Library of Congress.

== Cast ==
- Pearl White as Pearl Travers
- Warren William as Mr. Jones (credited as Warren Krech)
- Harry Semels as Jud Deering
- Tom McIntyre
- William Nally
- Wally Oettel
- Edward J. Pool
- Charles 'Patch' Revada

== Chapter titles ==
1. The Bandaged Man
2. Held By the Enemy
3. The Hidden Thing
4. Ruin
5. To Beat a Knave
6. Heights of Hazard
7. Mocked from the Grave
8. The Human Target
9. Game Clear Through
10. Against Time
11. Spunk
12. Under the Floor
13. Swamp of Lost Souls
14. The Madman
15. A King's Ransom

== See also ==
- List of film serials
- List of film serials by studio
