= The Iron Claw (1916 serial) =

1916 film

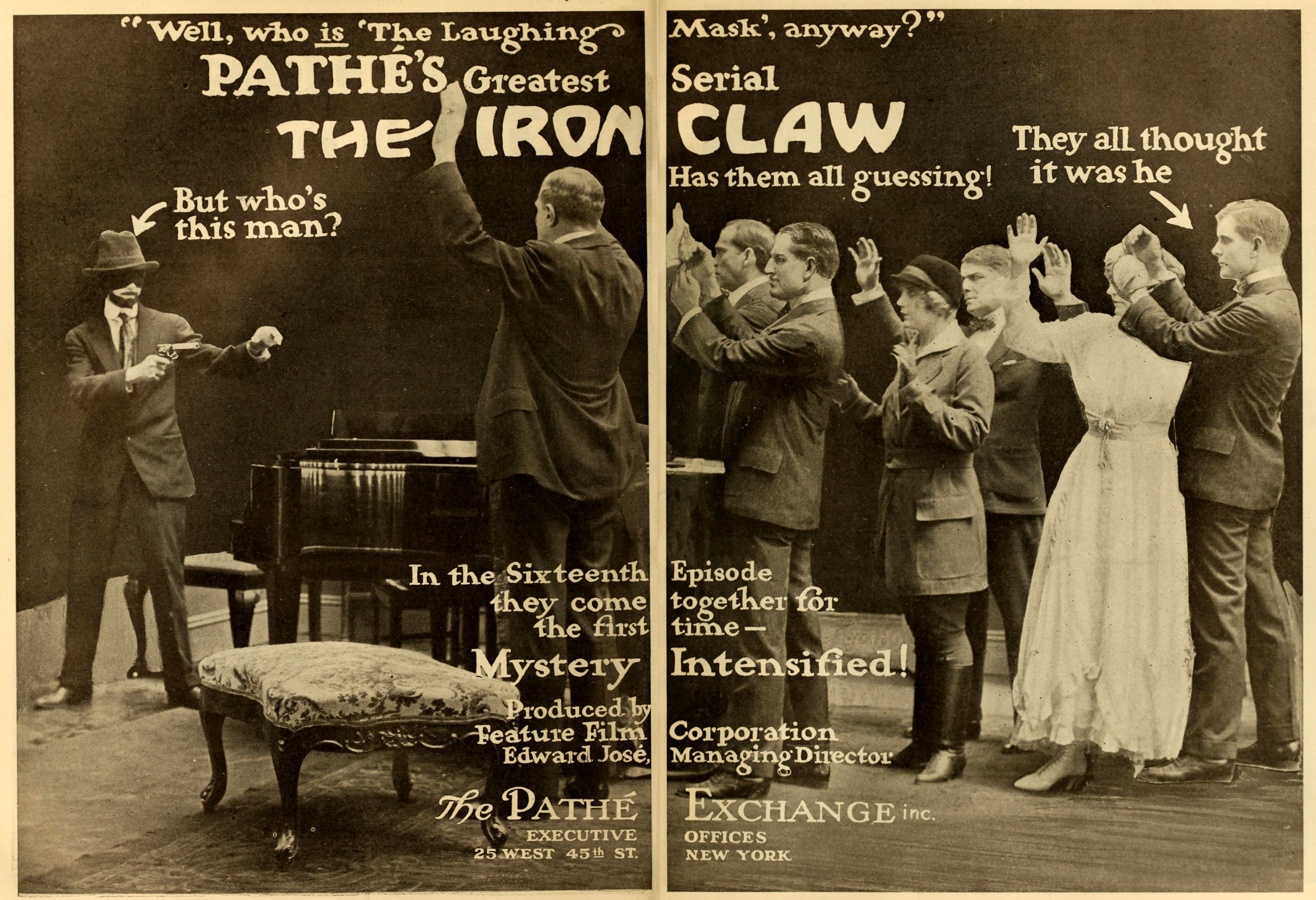
- Film poster
- Directed by: George B. Seitz; Edward José
- Written by: George B. Seitz
- Produced by: Edward José
- Starring: Pearl White; Creighton Hale
- Distributed by: Pathé Exchange
- Release date: February 28, 1916
- Running time: 20 episodes
- Country: United States
- Language: Silent

The Iron Claw is a 1916 American silent adventure 20 episode film serial starring Pearl White, directed by George B. Seitz and Edward José, and released by Pathé Exchange. A print of the seventh episode exists in the UCLA Film & Television Archive.

== Cast ==
- Pearl White as Margery Golden
- Creighton Hale as Davey
- Sheldon Lewis as Legar, The Iron Claw
- Harry L. Fraser as The Laughing Mask
- J. E. Dunn as Enoch Golden
- Carey Lee as Mrs. Golden
- Clare Miller as Margery, as a Child
- Henry G. Sell as Wrench
- Edward José as Manley
- E. Cooper Willis
- Allan Walker
- Bert Gudgeon
- George B. Seitz
