= The Black Secret =

1919 film

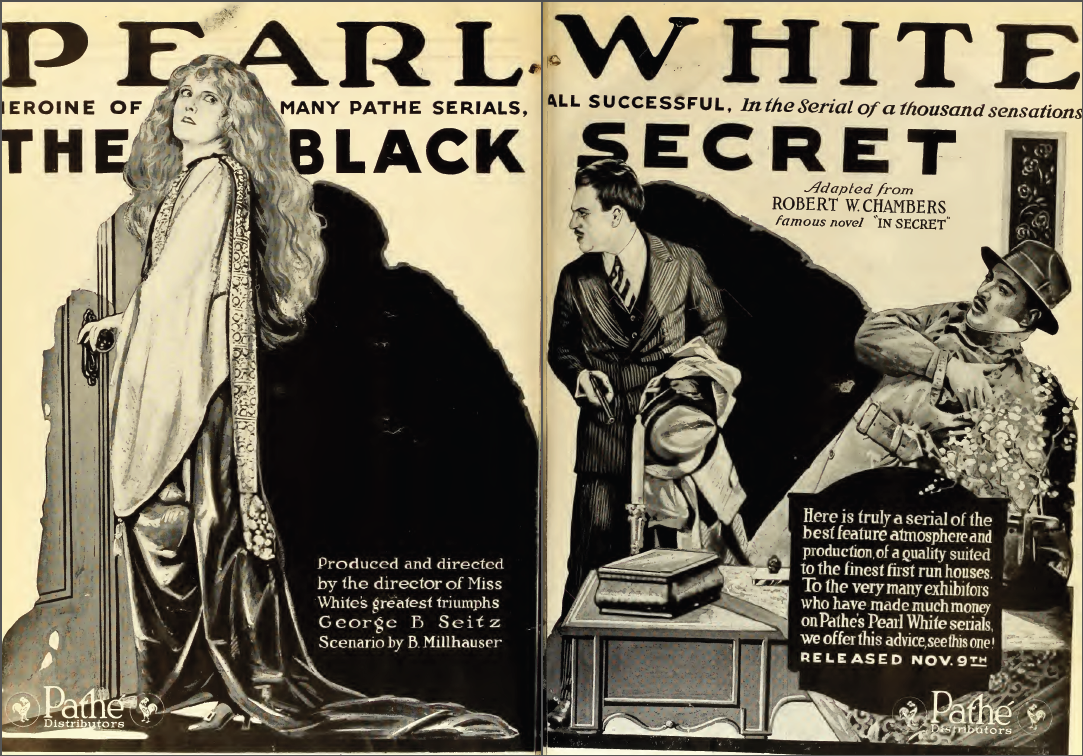
- Ad for film with Pearl White
- Directed by: George B. Seitz
- Written by: Robert W. Chambers; Bertram Millhauser
- Produced by: George B. Seitz
- Starring: Pearl White; Walter McGrail
- Production company: George Seitz Productions
- Distributed by: Pathé Exchange
- Release date: November 9, 1919
- Running time: 15 episodes
- Country: United States
- Language: Silent (English intertitles)

The Black Secret is a 1919 American adventure film serial directed by George B. Seitz. The film was recorded in both Fort Lee, New Jersey, as well as in the nearby Hudson Palisades. Recording took place during a time when many of the early 20th century film studios in America's first motion picture industry were based there.

The film is currently considered to be lost. However, a portion survives, and, in 2021, was digitized and released by a YouTube channel based in the United Kingdom.

Lobby card

== Cast ==
- Pearl White as Evelyn Ereth
- Walter McGrail as Ray McKay
- Wallace McCutcheon Jr. as Frederick
- George B. Seitz
- Henry G. Sell
- Marjorie Milton
- Harry Semels
- Francis Wightwick

== See also ==
- List of film serials
- List of film serials by studio
- List of incomplete or partially lost films
