= The Woman Hater (1910 Powers film) =

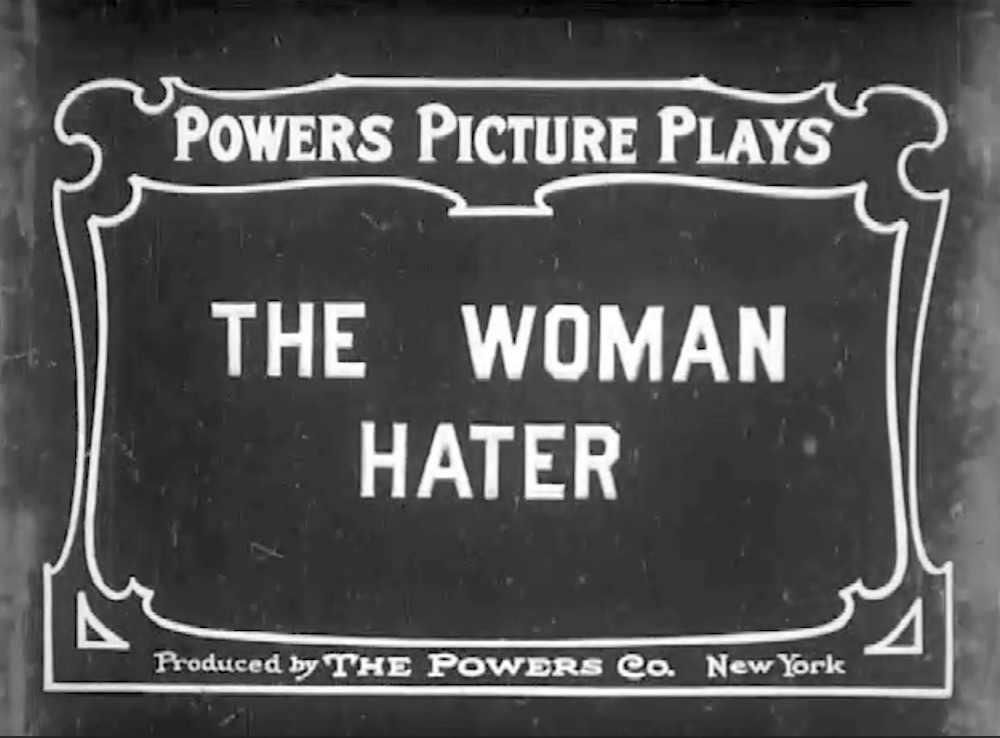
- Title card for the film
- Directed by: Joseph A. Golden
- Produced by: Pat Powers
- Starring: Pearl White; Stuart Holmes
- Cinematography: Caldwell
- Production company: Powers Picture Plays
- Distributed by: Motion Picture Distributing and Sales Company
- Release date: November 26, 1910
- Running time: 1 reel
- Country: United States
- Language: Silent (English intertitles)

The Woman Hater is a 1910 American short comedy film directed by Joseph A. Golden and starring Pearl White and Stuart Holmes.

== Plot ==
Hal receives a letter from his fiancée calling their engagement off and confessing feelings for another man. Distraught, he travels to his bachelor friend's ranch where there are "no women about." Before Hal's arrival, however, his bachelor friend's niece arrives at the ranch for a surprise visit. Hal is displeased with her presence but she shows interest in him.

The niece sneaks out to follow him when he goes horseback riding in the woods and witnesses his capture by a group of Native Americans. She returns to the ranch to inform the others who are there, who ride to the rescue and gun down the Native Americans just as they are about to burn Hal at the stake.

Back at the ranch, as she cares for the wounded Hal, the niece asks "[d]o you hate all women?" The uncle catches the two embracing and laughs. He exits the frame and they kiss.

== Production ==
The film was rediscovered in 2010 in New Zealand. The existing print runs at 13 minutes, but is incomplete, and is being preserved by the National Film Preservation Foundation and the New Zealand Film Archive.

== See also ==
- List of American films of 1910
