= Phillips Smalley =

American actor and director

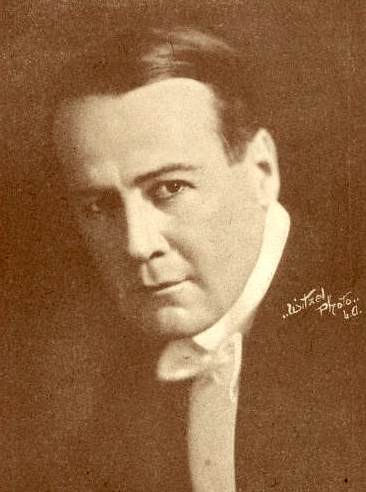
- Smalley in 1915
- Born: Wendell Phillips Smalley; August 7, 1865; Brooklyn, New York, U.S.
- Died: May 2, 1939 (aged 73)
- Education: Balliol College, Oxford
- Occupations: Actor, film director
- Years active: 1910–1939
- Spouses: Lois Weber (m. 1904; div. 1922) Phyllis Ephlin (m. 1925)
- Relatives: Wendell Phillips (grandfather)

Wendell Phillips Smalley (August 7, 1865 – May 2, 1939) was an American silent film director and actor.

== Biography ==
Born in Brooklyn, New York, he was the grandson of Wendell Phillips; he was the son of George Washburn Smalley, a war correspondent, and his wife Phoebe Garnaut, adopted by Phillips. He enrolled at Balliol College, Oxford in 1886.

Smalley began his career in vaudeville and acted in more than 200 film

between 1910 and his death in 1939. He began directing in 1911 and made more than 300 films by 1921.

Smalley was married to actress, writer, director, and producer Lois Weber from April 29, 1904, to 1922. They met in 1904 when Weber was acting in a theater where Smalley was stage manager. In 1908 Smalley and Weber began working for the U.S. division of Gaumont, where Smalley was an actor, and later a director. He is sometimes listed as a co-director with Lois Weber, and the extent of his contribution to her work is unresolved.

After their divorce in 1922, he married Phyllis Lorraine Ephlin, and they remained together until his death.

== Selected filmography ==
- Leaves in the Storm (1912)
- The Picture of Dorian Gray (1913)
- Will Power (1913)
- Suspense (1913)
- The Merchant of Venice (1914)
- Jewel (1915)
- Where Are My Children? (1916)
- The Dumb Girl of Portici (1916)
- The Hand That Rocks the Cradle (1917)
- The Double Standard (1917)
- For Husbands Only (1918)
- Forbidden (1919)
- When a Girl Loves (1919)
- Too Wise Wives (1921)
- Trimmed in Scarlet (1923)
- Cameo Kirby (1923)
- Flaming Youth (1923)
- The Self-Made Wife (1923)
- Temptation (1923)
- Single Wives (1924)
- Daughters of Today (1924)
- The Fate of a Flirt (1925)
- Charley's Aunt (1925)
- Stella Maris (1925)
- Wandering Footsteps (1925)
- Wasted Lives (1925)
- Soul Mates (1925)
- Queen o'Diamonds (1926)
- The Taxi Mystery (1926)
- The Midnight Sun (1926)
- The Broken Gate (1927)
- Sensation Seekers (1927)
- The Irresistible Lover (1927)
- Stage Kisses (1927)
- Man Crazy (1927)
- The Dice Woman (1928)
- Sinners in Love (1928)
- Romance of the Underworld (1928)
- Honeymoon Flats (1928)
- High Voltage (1929)
- The Racketeer (1929)
- The Aviator (1929)
- The Midnight Special (1930)
- High Stakes (1931)
- The Lawless Woman (1931)
- New Adventures of Get Rich Quick Wallingford (1931)
- Escapade (1932)
- The Face on the Barroom Floor (1932)
- Cocktail Hour (1933)
- Secret Sinners (1933)
- The Quitter (1934)
- It's in the Air (1935)
- A Day at the Races (1937)
- Second Honeymoon (1937)
- Bulldog Drummond's Revenge (1937)
- The Lady Objects (1938)
