= La Chauve-Souris =

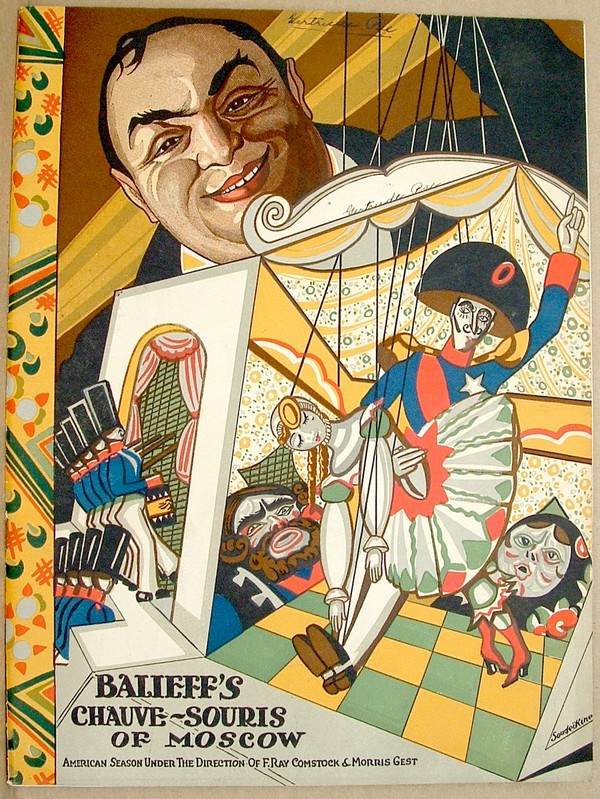
- 1922 program cover for first U.S. tour
- Music: various
- Lyrics: various
- Book: various
- Premiere: 1908: Moscow
- Productions: 1908 Moscow; 1920 Paris; 1922-1929 US Tour/Broadway

La Chauve-Souris (French: The Bat) was the name of a touring revue during the early 1900s. Originating in Moscow and then Paris, and directed by Nikita Balieff, the revue toured the United States, Europe, and South Africa. The show consisted of songs, dances, and sketches, most of which had been originally performed in Russia. The revue was enormously successful in the U.S., and one of its legacies is the popularization of the jaunty tune The Parade of the Wooden Soldiers by Leon Jessel.

== Early production history in Moscow, Paris, and London ==
In 1906, Russian-Armenian actor Nikita Balieff moved to Moscow, and took a job at the Moscow Art Theatre under Constantin Stanislavski. After years of only non-speaking roles, and with a desire to perform comedy rather than drama, Balieff, along with theatre devotee Nikolai Tarasov, co-created his own theatre group in a basement near the Moscow Art Theatre. He named the cabaret and troupe The Bat, after a well-known cabaret in Vienna called Fledermaus.

The Bat enjoyed much success and popularity in Moscow, until the Russian Revolution in 1917. Balieff then went into exile in western Europe, and began presenting vaudeville shows there with other Russian émigrés. La Chauve-Souris opened in Paris in December 1920. The spectacle was noticed by the British theatrical producer Charles B. Cochran, who brought Balieff and his troupe and show to London.

== In the United States ==
In 1922 La Chauve-Souris made its first tour to America, through an arrangement with the producer Morris Gest. La Chauve Souris performed on Broadway from February 1922 to June 1922 (153 performances) and January 1925 to March 1925 (61 performances) in productions produced by F. Ray Comstock and Morris Gest. Balieff and his company also toured from Washington, D.C. to California for 65 consecutive weeks.

Between 1922 and 1929, Balieff returned to America to tour six times, appearing on Broadway in 1922, 1923, 1925, 1927, and 1929, with one final show billed as New Chauve-Souris in 1931. In 1927 Balieff was featured on the cover of Time magazine.

The shows consisted of songs, dances, and sketches, most of which had been originally performed in Russia. Balieff, as master of ceremonies for the show, was known for his feigned lack of English on stage. His monologues and introductions were delivered in a mix of Russian, French, and English language and slang coupled with much gesticulation. However, in private Balieff's English was better than that of his stage persona.

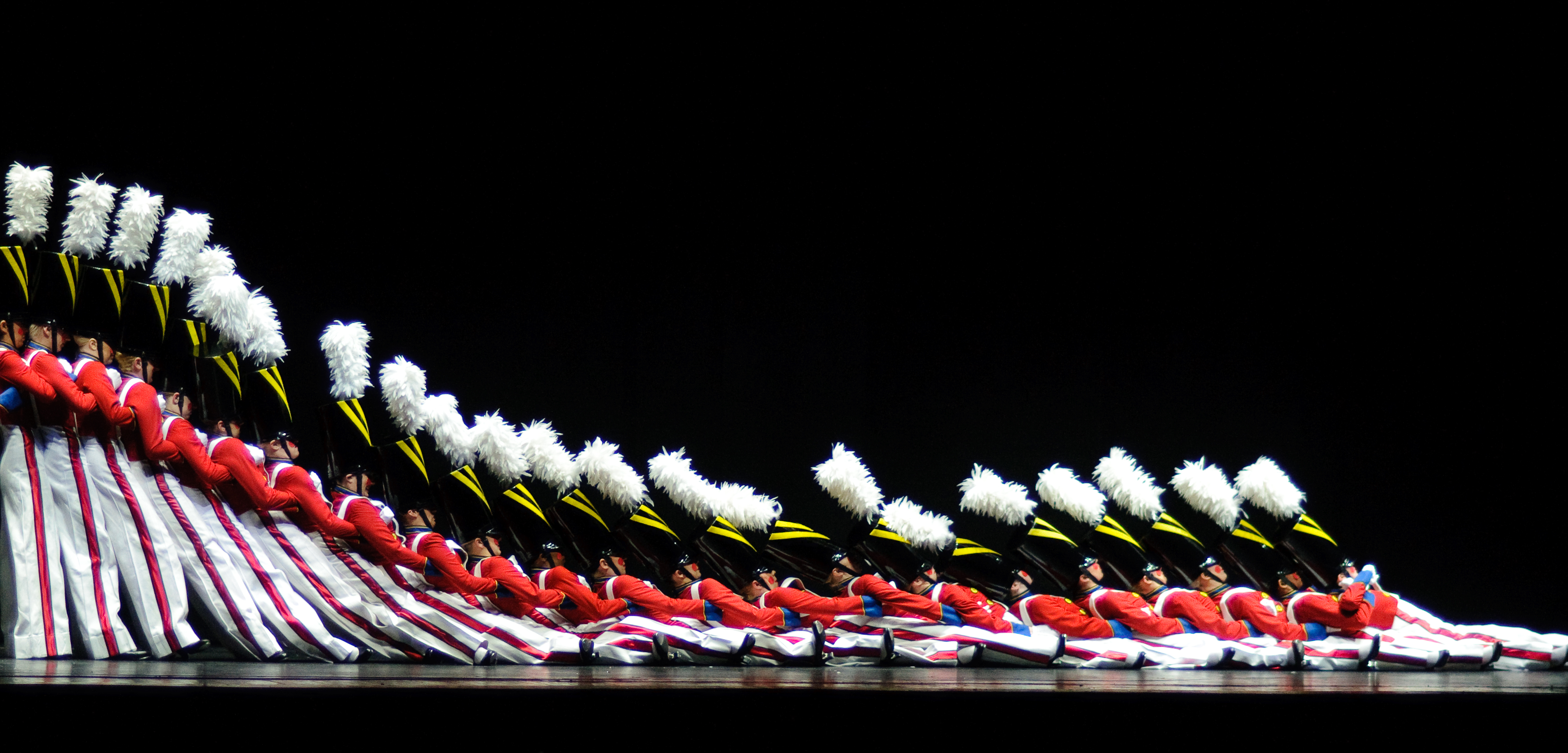
The Rockettes' annual "Parade of the Wooden Soldiers" mimics the original Chauve-Souris choreography.

One of La Chauve-Souris's most popular acts, The Parade of the Wooden Soldiers, which used the delightful Leon Jessel tune "Die Parade der Zinnsoldaten" ("The Parade of the Tin Soldiers"), referenced a story regarding Tsar Paul I. The legend claims the Tsar left his parade grounds without issuing a "halt" order to the marching soldiers. Without one, the soldiers marched to Siberia before being remembered and ordered back. The Balieff vaudeville version with its popular tune was a mainstay in Chauve-Souris, and later became part of The Rockettes repertoire as well in their Radio City Christmas Spectacular. The Chauve-Souris "Parade of the Wooden Soldiers" was also filmed, and premiered on April 15, 1923, at the Rivoli Theater.

La Chauve-Souris also toured Europe and South Africa, appearing in major capital cities.

In 1934 Balieff created a new Chauve-Souris production, which proved to be his last theatrical venture.

== Phonograph records ==
Several recordings were made of Chauve-Souris numbers.

Part of the La Chauve-Souris revue was recorded by British Columbia Graphophone Company, AX 2717, 2719 - 9220, speed 80 rpm, under the title Chauves Souris:

- Side A: "Round the Hay Wain"
- Side B: "A Russian Barcarole" In Russian. With Mmes. Birse & Ershova. Mm. Dedovitch & Shevtchenko. Introduction by Nikita Balieff. With the Vaudeville Theatre Orchestra conducted by S. Kogan.

"Was Macht Der Maier Am Himalaya?" ("Where Is My Meyer?") (Fritz Rotter, Otto Stransky, Anton Profes) was recorded electrically in German in March 1928 by the Manhattan Male Quartet for Edison, issued as diamond disc 57027-R.

The duet for Lisa and Pauline in Tchaikovsky's "Pique Dame" ("The Queen of Spades") Act 1, Scene 2, was recorded on a French 78 rpm disc Col. DFX 134, also UK Col. DX 440. It was sung by Eugenie Safanova and Finaida Erchova, two members of "La Chauve-Souris," with the Cambridge Theatre Orchestra conducted by Archangelsky. The other side of the disc was an 'air populaire' entitled "La Fille du Rémouleur," sung by the company in French under Balieff's direction, with Archangelsky conducting the same orchestra. The recording was made on 6 January 1933.

== Film version ==
Lee DeForest filmed Parade of the Wooden Soldiers (to the music Die Parade der Zinnsoldaten by Leon Jessel), a popular segment from the stage production performed by Nikita Balieff and La Chauve-Souris, in DeForest's Phonofilm sound-on film process.

1922 U.S. sheet music of The Parade of the Wooden Soldiers

The short film premiered 15 April 1923 as part of a program of 18 Phonofilms at the Rivoli Theater in New York City, and then in England, Japan, and Australia. The film, shown under the title Parade of the Wooden Soldiers with two-color Technicolor sequences, is now in the Maurice Zouary collection of the Library of Congress.

== Parody ==
La Chauve-Souris inspired a parody called No Sirree! (subtitled "An Anonymous Entertainment by the Vicious Circle of the Hotel Algonquin"), written and performed by Robert Benchley and other members of the Algonquin Round Table for one night only in April 1922.

No Sirree! had its genesis at the studio of Neysa McMein, which served as something of a salon for Round Tablers away from the Algonquin Hotel. Acts included: "Opening Chorus" featuring Alexander Woollcott, John Peter Toohey, George S. Kaufman, Marc Connelly, Franklin P. Adams, and Benchley, with violinist Jascha Heifetz providing offstage, off-key accompaniment; "He Who Gets Flapped," a musical number featuring the song "The Everlastin' Ingenue Blues" written by Dorothy Parker and performed by Robert E. Sherwood accompanied by "chorus girls" including Tallulah Bankhead, Helen Hayes, Ruth Gillmore, Lenore Ulric, and Mary Brandon; "Zowie, or the Curse of an Akins Heart"; "The Greasy Hag, an O'Neill Play in One Act" with Kaufman, Connelly and Woollcott; and "Mr. Whim Passes By - An A. A. Milne Play."
