= Christmas in Los Angeles =

Official Christmas song of Los Angeles, California

"Christmas in Los Angeles" is the official Christmas song of the city of Los Angeles, California. It was written by the Sherman Brothers in 1980 on assignment from Lawrence Welk and was featured on his 1980 Christmas TV Special. The song was used for several years in the 1980s as a specialty number during The Rockettes Radio City Christmas Spectacular.

== Points of interest ==
- It was the last commercial recording by Lawrence Welk.
- In 1981, Los Angeles Mayor, Tom Bradley gave the song its "official" status by way of declaration.
- Welk's recording of this song can be heard during the holidays over KOST as well as on KRTH-FM and KCBS-FM.
