= The City (1916 film) =

- Directed by: Thurlow Bergen
- Written by: Clyde Fitch(play); Theodore Wharton(scenario)
- Produced by: Leopold Wharton; Theodore Wharton; F. Ray Comstock Photoplay Company
- Starring: Thurlow Bergen
- Distributed by: World Film Company
- Release date: January 17, 1916
- Running time: 5 reels
- Country: USA
- Language: Silent...(English titles)

The City is a lost 1916 silent film based on Clyde Fitch's 1909 play, The City. It was distributed by the World Film Company.

== Cast ==
- Thurlow Bergen - George Rand, Jr.
- Riley Hatch - George Rand, Sr. (*as William Riley Hatch)
- Elsie Esmond - Emily Rand
- Bessie Wharton - Mary Hale (*Bessie E. Wharton)
- F. W. Stewart - Jim Hammock, Sr. (*as Richard Stewart)
- Allan Murnane - Hannock, Jr.
- Betty Borden -
