= Thurlow Bergen =

American actor

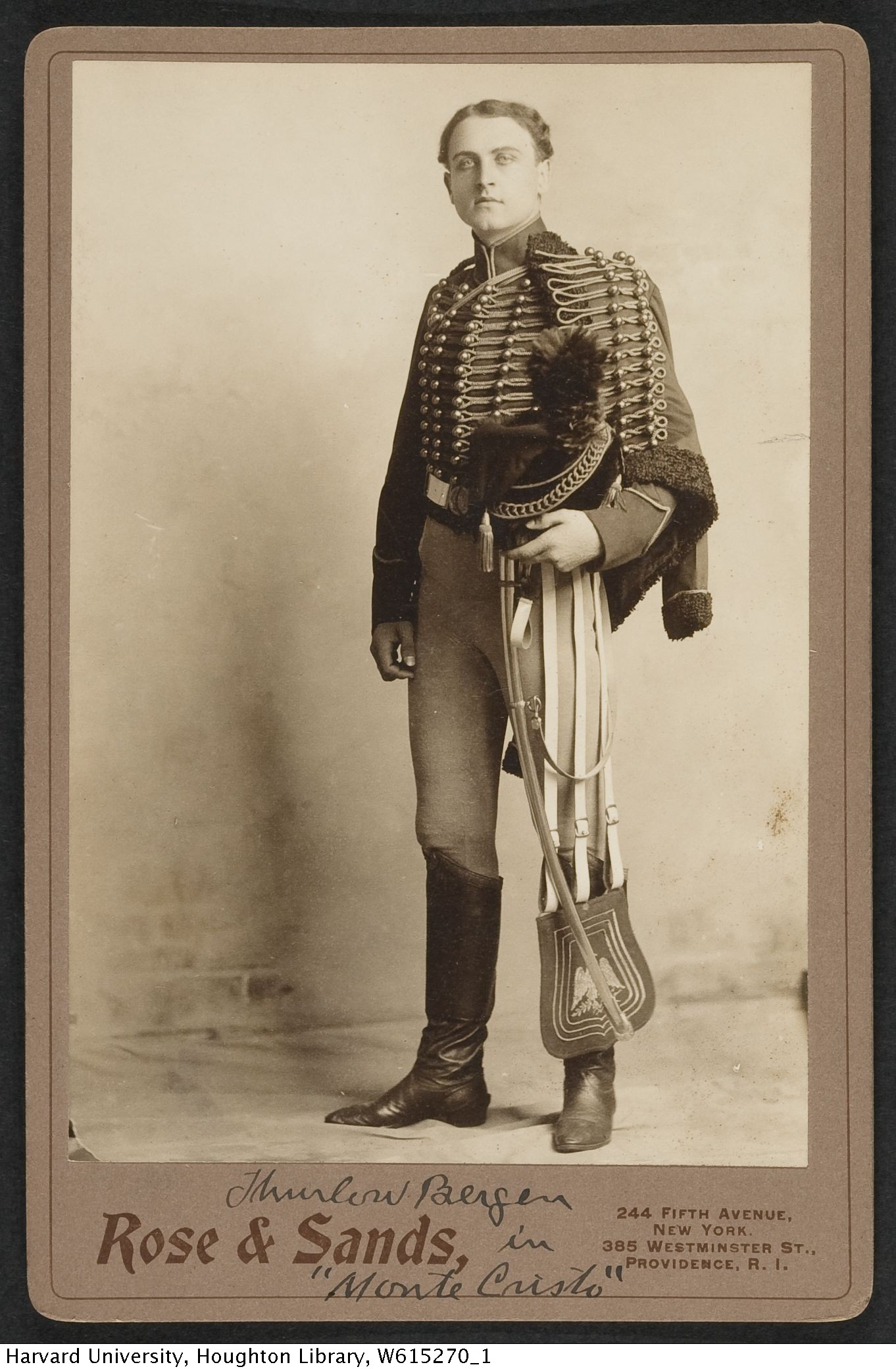
Thurlow Bergen in Monte Cristo

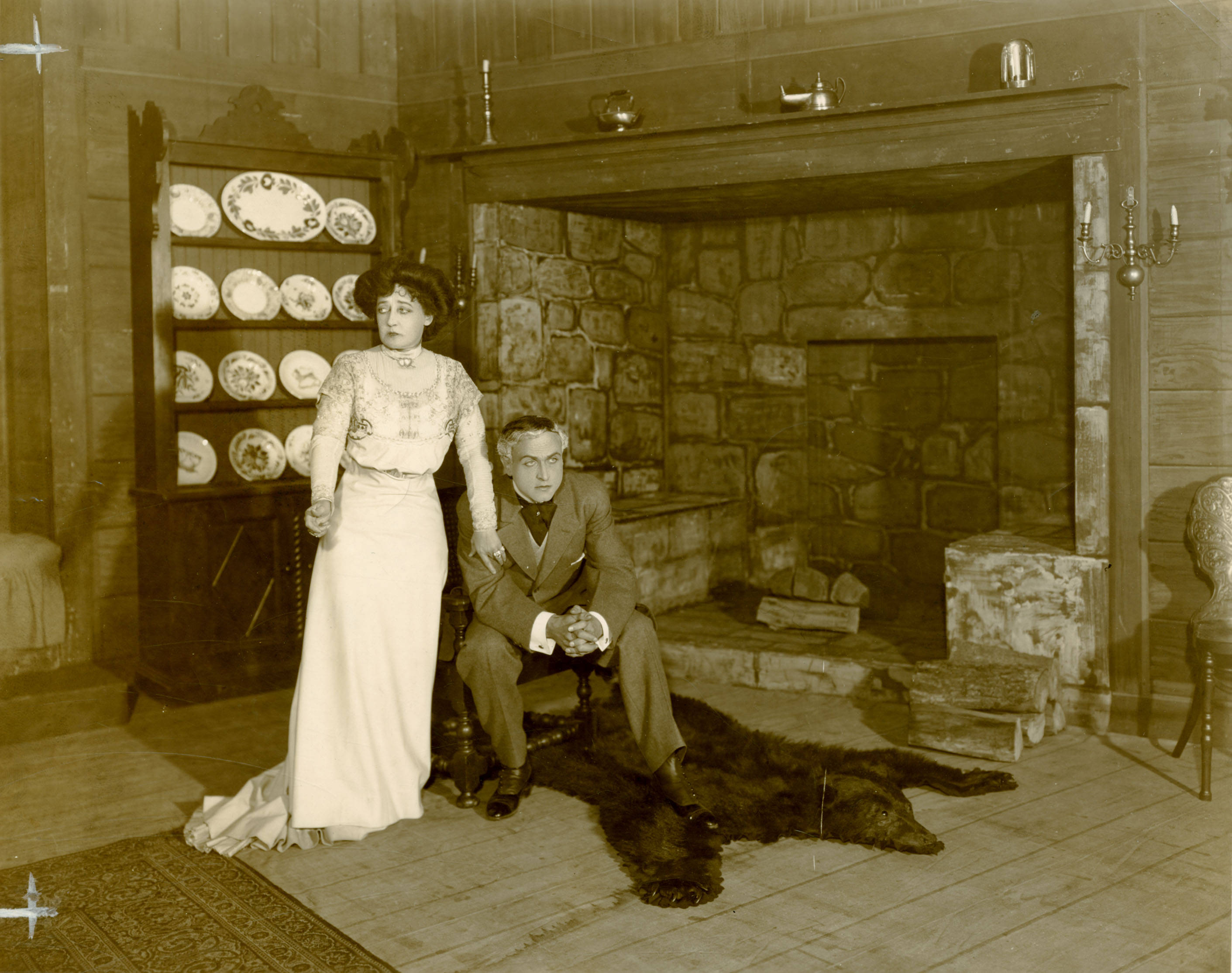
Bergen with Florence Roberts in The House of Bondage 1908.

Thurlow Weed Bergen (1875–1954) was an American actor of stage and silent film.

Bergen was born on January 14, 1875, East Saginaw, Michigan to Issarella (Ella) Winner and the lawyer George B. Bergen. Bergen went to study law in Washington D.C., but at the age of 19 decided to become an actor instead. As a kid he had written and composed Esther's Lullaby, which around the turn of the century was a well-known song. He played and sang it at the White House for President Cleveland, who gave him permission to dedicate the song to his daughter Esther. Bergen moved to Newton, Massachusetts, where he married Clara Beatrice Farquhar in 1899, the daughter of the wealthy Boston financier Samuel Farquhar. He started a successful touring company, and dabbled in composition and writing as well (he wrote many children's stories). Up to 1914 he performed on stage only, but then made the switch to the movies, first starring in the Pathé movie The Stain. By that time Farquhar and he had divorced, and in May 1914 Bergen married fellow Broadway performer Elsie Esmond née Sturkow. They were the leading man and lady in most of the early Whartons Studio movies (shot in Ithaca, New York), including The Boundary Rider , The Kiss of Death, A Prince of India, The Fireman and the Girl and The Stolen Birthright (all still in 1914) and The Lottery Man of 1916. After 1920, he returned to the stage and performed on Broadway as late as 1940, when he appears in the census as a single theater actor living in an apartment in Manhattan, New York. He died May 1, 1954.

== Selected filmography ==
- The Stain (1914)
- The Running Fight (1915)
- The Little Gypsy (1915)
- The City (1916)
- The Lottery Man (1916)
- Lure of Ambition (1919)
