= F. Ray Comstock =

American theatrical producer and theater operator

- Comstock (center)
- Born: 27 August 1878; Buffalo, New York, US
- Died: 15 October 1949 (aged 71); Boston, Massachusetts, US
- Occupations: Theatrical producer and theater operator

F. Ray Comstock (27 August 1878 – 15 October 1949) was an American theatrical producer and theater operator. He pioneered the intimate musical comedy, staging several successful comedies at his Princess Theatre in Manhattan. He also produced spectacular musicals, variety shows and serious plays by authors such as Henrik Ibsen and Maxim Gorky.

== Early years ==
F. Ray Comstock was born in Buffalo, New York, on 27 August 1878. His first job was as a theater usher in Buffalo. He moved to New York, and became assistant treasurer at the Criterion Theatre. In 1905 he presented The School Girl, which ran for 150 nights at Daly's Theater. The original show ran for 400 nights at the Prince of Wales Theatre, London. In 1905 Comstock held the lease at the Hippodrome Theatre. That year he entered into a partnership with Morris Gest. Gest was of Russian Jewish origins, an immigrant to the USA. In 1907 Comstock put on his first Broadway theatre production, Fascinating Flora. This was followed in 1908 by Bandana Land, one of the first “Negro” musicals. In 1909 Comstock leased the Colonial Theater in Cleveland, Ohio. The next year he leased it to the Shubert brothers.

== Princess Theatre musicals ==
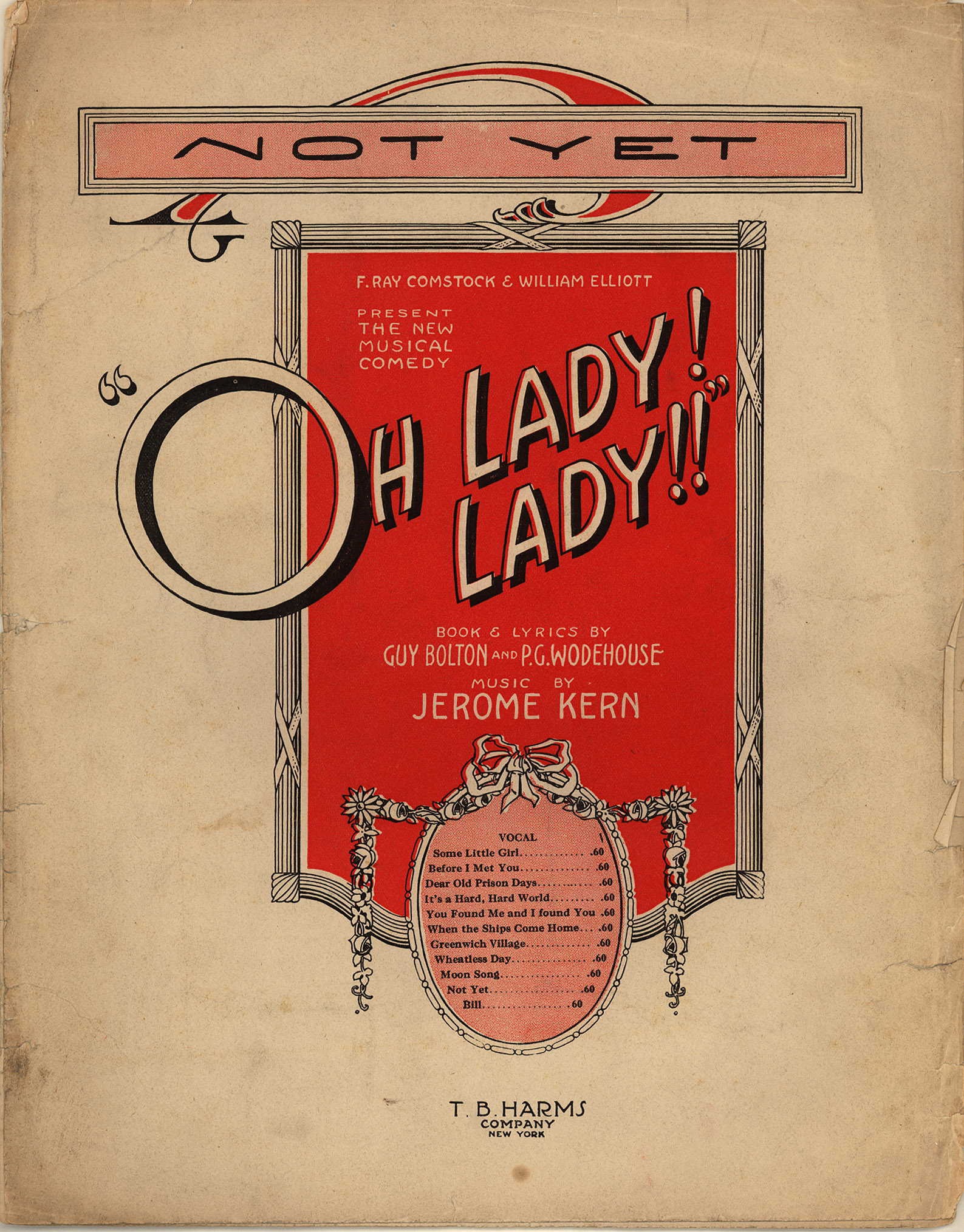
Sheet music cover of the song "Not Yet", from the musical Oh, Lady! Lady!!

Archibald Selwyn partnered with the Shubert Brothers and William A. Brady in building the Princess Theatre, a small 299-seat auditorium on 39th street that opened in 1913. The theater was not successful at first, and Selwyn and Brady gave up their shares to Comstock. Comstock produced Jerome Kern's Nobody Home in 1915, presented in the Princess Theatre. The reaction was generally favorable, and Comstock recognized that a small house like the Princess could provide a venue for a musical comedy that was more intimate and friendly than a larger theater.

Comstock formed the Marbury-Comstock Company with Elizabeth Marbury, and commissioned a second musical comedy from Kern, Very Good Eddie. This opened on 23 December 1915 and ran for 341 performances. It then went on the road for another year. The show was deliberately informal and low key, with a more coherent story line than most such comedies and less dancing. It established the genre of the "intimate" musical comedy. The Princess Theatre musicals revolved around modern people in situations that were comic but possible. A cast of about thirty was supported by an eleven-piece orchestra. There were two sets, both relatively simple. This was a gamble, but it paid off.

Elliot and Comstock co-produced Oh, Boy!, which opened at the Princess on 20 February 1917. The show, by Kern, Guy Bolton and P. G. Wodehouse, starred the young Marion Davies, Justine Johnstone, Tom Powers and Edna May Oliver. Oh, Boy! ran for 463 performances. Oh, Lady! Lady!! was another successful musical by the same team. It opened at the Princess on 1 February 1918 and ran for 219 performances. Stars included Vivienne Segal and Margaret Dale.

== Film productions ==
Comstock ventured into film. The F. Ray Comstock Film Corporation released Evidence in 1915, a silent film drama. In 1916 the F. Ray Comstock Photoplay Company released The Lottery Man, a silent feature based on the play of the same name by Rida Johnson Young. Comstock co-produced the film with Leopold and Theodore Wharton. The film was made in 1915 at Wharton Studios in Ithaca, New York.

== Other shows ==
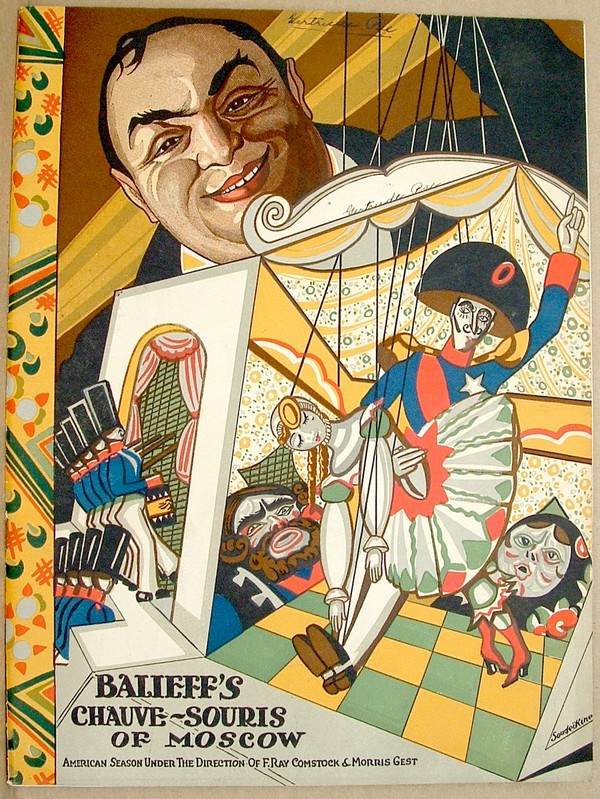
Nikita Balieff's La Chauve-Souris; American season Program Cover (1922)

Leave It to Jane, co-produced with William Elliot, opened at the Longacre Theatre on 28 August 1917 and ran for 167 performances. This was another new musical with lyrics by P.G. Wodehouse. Miss 1917 opened at the Century Theatre on 5 November 1917. It only lasted 48 performances.

In 1917 Comstock and Morris Gest began rehearsals for a Broadway production of the hit British musical extravaganza Chu Chin Chow at the Manhattan Opera House. After several weeks of rehearsal, the cast still did not know when the show would open or what they would be paid. The Actors' Equity Association, had been formed in 1913 to arbitrate disputes over pay and working hours with the Managing Producer's Association. They saw Chu Chin Chow as an opportunity for a class action. Comstock moved quickly to agree on wages with the cast, and forestalled the threat.

Chu Chin Chow, staged by Gest, William Elliott and Comstock was a "musical tale of the East". The musical starred Tyrone Power, Sr., Florence Reed and George Rasely. It combined elements of pantomime, ballet, musical comedy and comic opera. The settings, lighting, music and stagecraft techniques combined to make a remarkable production. On 31 December 1917 William Elliott, Comstock, and Gest announced that they had leased the Century Theatre and would transfer Chu Chin Chow there in January 1918. They subsequently used the Manhattan Opera House for melodramatic spectacles, while the Century would be devoted exclusively to "the highest class musical productions".

Comstock and Gest produced Aphrodite at the Century Theatre, running for 148 performances in 1919–20. An exotic musical spectacle with an Oriental theme, the show had no real substance. In January 1922 Comstock and Gest announced that they had engaged the Chauve-Souris company from the Art Theatre, Moscow. This was a 35-person company directed by Nikita Balieff that performed one-act plays, comedies, tragedies, songs, dances and musical numbers. Balieff was seen as a rebel, and was much praised in America.

F. Ray Comstock died in Boston, Massachusetts, on 15 October 1949.

== Productions ==
Comstock's productions included:

- Fascinating Flora (Musical, Comedy) Produced by Burnside & Comstock, Inc., May 20, 1907 – September 7, 1907
- Bandanna Land (Musical, Comedy) February 3, 1908 – April 18, 1908
- Father and Son (Play) September 24, 1908 – October 1908
- Mr. Lode of Koal (Musical) November 1, 1909 – December 4, 1909
- The Watcher (Play) January 27, 1910 – February 1910
- The Smoldering Flame (Play) September 23, 1913 – September 1913
- The Third Party (Play) August 3, 1914
- The Story of the Rosary (Play) September 7, 1914 – October 1914
- The Revolt (Play) April 1, 1915 – May 1915
- The Peasant Girl (Musical) Produced in association with F. Ray Comstock, March 2, 1915 – June 5, 1915
- Nobody Home (Play with music) April 20, 1915 – August 7, 1915
- Our Children (Play) Produced in association with F. Ray Comstock, September 10, 1915
- Hobson's Choice (Play) November 2, 1915
- Very Good Eddie (Musical) Produced by Marbury-Comstock Co., December 23, 1915 – October 14, 1916
- Go to It (Musical) October 24, 1916 – November 1916
- The Wanderer (Play) February 1, 1917 – May 1917
- Kitty Darlin' (Musical, Romance) November 7, 1917 – November 17, 1917
- Leave It to Jane (Musical, Comedy) August 28, 1917 – January 19, 1918
- Experience (Play, Play with music, Revival) January 22, 1918
- Oh, Boy (Musical) February 20, 1917 – March 30, 1918
- Chu Chin Chow (Musical) October 22, 1917 – April 27, 1918
- Oh, Lady! Lady!! (Musical, Comedy) February 1, 1918 – August 10, 1918
- The Maid of the Mountains (Musical) September 11, 1918 – October 12, 1918
- Oh, My Dear! (Musical, Comedy) November 27, 1918 – May 10, 1919
- The Five Million (Play, Comedy) July 8, 1919 – September 1919
- Adam and Eva (Play, Comedy) September 13, 1919 – June 1920
- The Luck of the Navy (Play, Drama) October 14, 1919 – November 1919
- The Light of the World (Play, Drama) January 6, 1920 – February 1920
- The Rose of China (Musical, Comedy) November 25, 1919 – January 7, 1920
- Aphrodite (Play, Romance) November 24, 1919 – April 3, 1920
- The Cave Girl (Play, Comedy) August 18, 1920 – September 1920
- The Checkerboard (Play, Comedy) August 19, 1920 – September 1920
- The Century Revue (Musical, Revue) July 12, 1920 – January 1, 1921
- Mecca (Musical, Mime, Spectacle) October 4, 1920 – January 22, 1921
- Afgar (Musical, Spectacle) November 8, 1920 – April 2, 1921
- La Chauve-Souris (1922) (Musical, Vaudeville) Presented by F. Ray Comstock, February 4, 1922 – June 1922
- La Chauve-Souris (1922) (Musical, Revue, Vaudeville) June 5, 1922 – October 1922
- La Chauve-Souris (1922)' (Musical, Revue, Vaudeville) October 9, 1922 – January 1923
- Tsar Fyodor Ivanovitch (Play) 1923
- The Lower Depths (Play) 1923
- The Cherry Orchard (Play, Comedy) 1923
- The Three Sisters (Play, Drama) 1923
- The Lady from the Provinces (Play) 1923
- The Brothers Karamazoff (Play) 1923
- Polly Preferred (Play, Comedy) January 11, 1923 – June 1923
- La Chauve-Souris (1922) (Musical, Revue, Vaudeville) January 4, 1923 – May 5, 1923
- La Chauve-Souris (1922) (Musical, Revue, Vaudeville) September 3, 1923 – September 29, 1923
- The Brothers Karamazoff (Play) 1923
- Mistress of the Inn (Play) 1923
- Ivanov (Play) 1923
- The Cherry Orchard (Play, Comedy, Revival) 1923
- In the Claws of Life (Play) 1923
- An Enemy of the People (Play, Drama, Revival) 1923
- Enough Stupidity in Every Wise Man (Play) 1923
- Uncle Vanya (Play, Drama) 1923
- The Death of Pazukhin (Play) 1923
- The Lower Depths (Play, Revival) 1923
- The Lady from the Sea (Play, Drama, Revival) November 29, 1923 – December 1923
- Mistress of the Inn (Play) 1924
- Ivanov (Play, Revival) 1924
- The Cherry Orchard (Play, Comedy, Revival) 1924
- In the Claws of Life (Play) 1924
- An Enemy of the People (Play, Revival) 1924
- Enough Stupidity in Every Wise Man (Play) 1924
- Uncle Vanya (Play, Drama) 1924
- The Death of Pazukhin (Play) 1924
- The Lower Depths (Play, Revival) 1924
- The Miracle (Play) January 16, 1924 – June 1924
- Mistress of the Inn (Play) 1924
- Ivanov (Play, Revival) 1924
- The Cherry Orchard (Play, Drama, Revival) 1924
- In the Claws of Life (Play) 1924
- An Enemy of the People (Play, Revival) 1924
- Enough Stupidity in Every Wise Man (Play) 1924
- Uncle Vanya (Play, Drama, Revival) 1924
- The Death of Pazukhin (Play) 1924
- Tsar Fyodor Ivanovitch (Play, Revival) 1924
- The Lower Depths (Play, Revival) 1924
- Sitting Pretty (Musical, Comedy) April 8, 1924 – June 28, 1924
- Little Jessie James (Musical, Farce, Comedy) Theatre Owned / Operated by F. Ray Comstock, August 15, 1923 – July 19, 1924
- La Chauve-Souris (1925) (Musical, Revue, Vaudeville) January 14, 1925 – March 7, 1925
- Lysistrata (Play, Comedy) December 14, 1925 – December 1925
- Sour Grapes (Play, Comedy) Theatre Owned / Operated by F. Ray Comstock, September 6, 1926 – October 1926
- The Command to Love (Play, Comedy) Theatre Owned / Operated by F. Ray Comstock, September 20, 1927 – April 1928
- La Chauve-Souris (1927) (Special, Vaudeville) October 10, 1927 – December 17, 1927
