= Sheltered Daughters =

1921 film by Edward Dillon

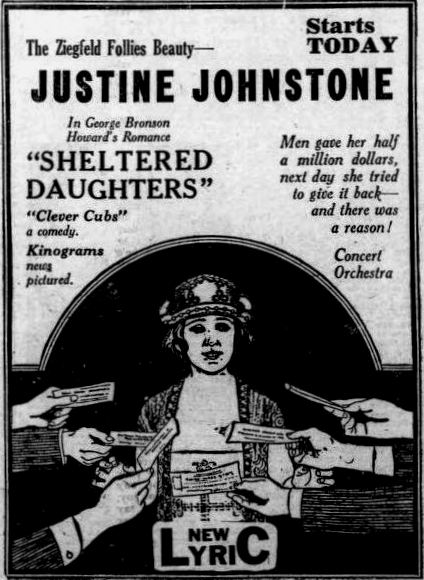
- Newspaper ad
- Directed by: Edward Dillon
- Written by: Clara Beranger, George Bronson Howard
- Cinematography: George J. Folsey
- Production company: Realart Pictures
- Release date: May 21, 1921
- Country: United States
- Language: Silent (English intertitles)

Sheltered Daughters is a 1921 American silent film directed by Edward Dillon, starring Justine Johnstone, Riley Hatch, Charles K. Gerrard and Warner Baxter.

== Plot ==
Jim Dark is a police officer determined to shelter his daughter, Jenny, from the world and its evils. As a result, Jenny lives in a dream world, fascinated with Joan of Arc. She meets a man posing as a Frenchman who takes advantage of her and her naivete. He asks Jenny's help in collecting charity ostensibly for French orphans, all the while planning to pocket the money. Jenny's father, though, learns of the plot and intervenes before the outlaw can get away.

== Cast ==
- Justine Johnstone as Jenny Dark
- Riley Hatch as Jim Dark, Her Father
- Warner Baxter as Pep Mullins
- Charles K. Gerrard as French Pete
- Helen Ray as Adele
- Edna Holland as Sonia
- James Laffey as Cleghorn
- Jimmie Lapsley as Pinky Porter
- Dan E. Charles as The Ferret

== Preservation ==
With no prints of Sheltered Daughters located in any film archives, it is considered a lost film.
