= Nikita Balieff =

Russian Armenian born vaudevillian, stage performer, writer, impresario and director

- Նիկիտա Բալիև
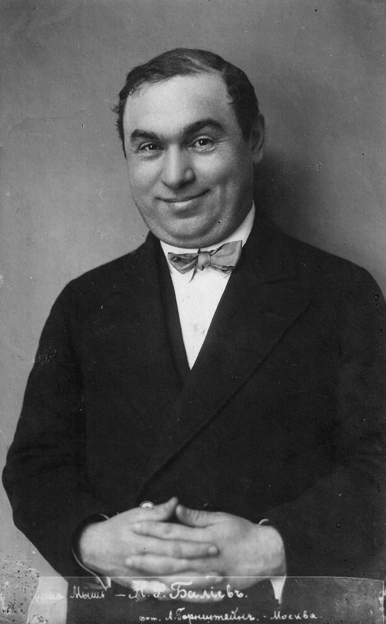
- Nikita Balieff by Sergis Alberts, 1909
- Born: Mkrtich Balyan; 1877; Erzerum, Ottoman Empire (disputed)
- Died: September 3, 1936 (aged 58–59); New York City, New York, United States
- Occupations: Vaudeville, stage performer, writer, impresario, director

Nikita Fyodorovich Balieff (Note: Armenian: Նիկիտա Ֆյոդորովիչ Բալիև, romanized: Nikita Fyodorovič Baliew; Russian: Никита Фёдорович Балиев, romanized: Nikita Fyodorovich Baliyev) (c. 1873 – September 3, 1936, born Mkrtich Balyan) (Note: Armenian: Մկրտիչ Բալյան, romanized: Mkrtič Balyan) was a Russian Armenian vaudevillian, stage performer, writer, impresario, and director. He is best known as the creator and master of ceremonies of La Chauve-Souris theater group.

== Theatrical career begins in Moscow ==
Balieff is believed to have been born in Erzerum, Ottoman Empire in 1873, he left for Moscow in 1906 and took a job at the Moscow Art Theater under Konstantin Stanislavski. After years of only non-speaking roles, and with a desire to perform comedy rather than drama, Balieff co-created (with Nikolai Tarasov) his own theater group in a basement near the Moscow Art Theater. He named the troupe La Chauve-Souris (French for "bat") after a bat flew up out of the basement door and landed on his hat.

Chauve-Souris enjoyed much success and popularity in Moscow, until the Russian Revolution in 1917. Balieff then went into exile in Paris and began presenting vaudeville shows there with other Russian émigrés. He was noticed by the British theatrical producer Charles B. Cochran, who brought the troupe to London.

== Success in the United States ==
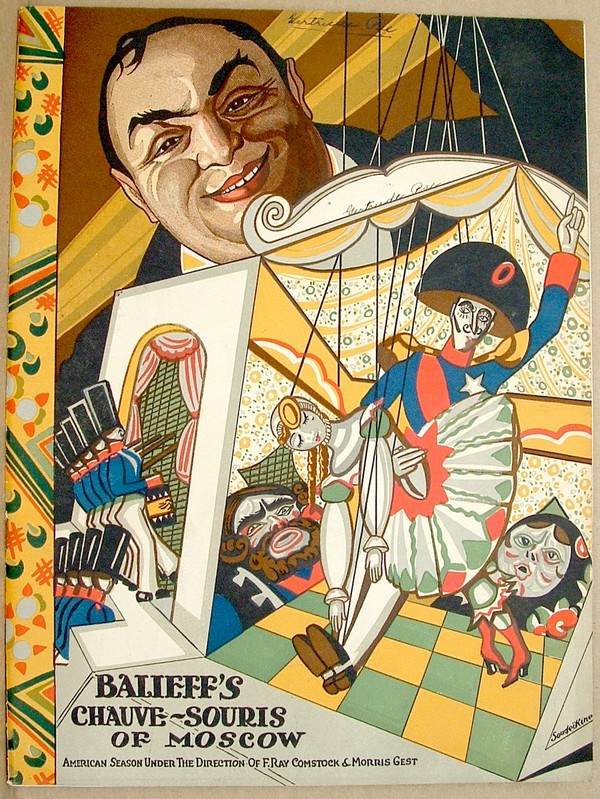
1922 program cover for first American tour of La Chauve-Souris

In 1922 Chauve-Souris made its first tour to the US through an arrangement with the producer Morris Gest. Balieff and his company toured from Washington, D.C. to California for 65 consecutive weeks. Between 1922 and 1929, Balieff returned to America to tour six times, appearing on Broadway in 1922, 1923, 1925, 1927, and 1929, with one final show billed as New Chauve-Souris in 1931. His shows consisted of songs, dances, and sketches, most of which had been originally performed in Russia.

One of his most popular acts, The Parade of the Wooden Soldiers, which used the Leon Jessel tune "Die Parade der Zinnsoldaten" ("The Parade of the Tin Soldiers"), referenced a story regarding Tsar Paul I. The legend claims the Tsar left his parade grounds without issuing a "halt" order to the marching soldiers. Without one, the soldiers marched to Siberia before being remembered and ordered back. The Balieff vaudeville version with its popular tune was a mainstay in Chauve-Souris, and later became part of The Rockettes repertoire as well. Wooden Soldiers was filmed in the DeForest Phonofilm sound-on-film process, and premiered on 15 April 1923 at the Rivoli Theater in New York City, along with 18 other short films made by DeForest. This short film is located in the Maurice Zouary collection at the Library of Congress.

Balieff was known for his feigned lack of English on stage. His monologues and introductions were delivered in a mix of Russian, French, and English language and slang coupled with much gesticulation. However, in private his English was better than that of his stage persona. His company toured Europe and South Africa, appearing in major capital cities. He was married to Helena Komisarjevska, a member of one of his theatrical companies. In 1927 he was featured on the cover of Time magazine.

In 1934 Balieff created a new Chauve-Souris production, which proved to be his last theatrical venture. The fall of that year marked his final stage appearance: Continental Varieties, a revue at the Helen Hayes Theatre, which featured Lucienne Boyer. He also appeared in the Ben Hecht-Charles MacArthur film, Once in a Blue Moon (1935).

== Death and funeral ==
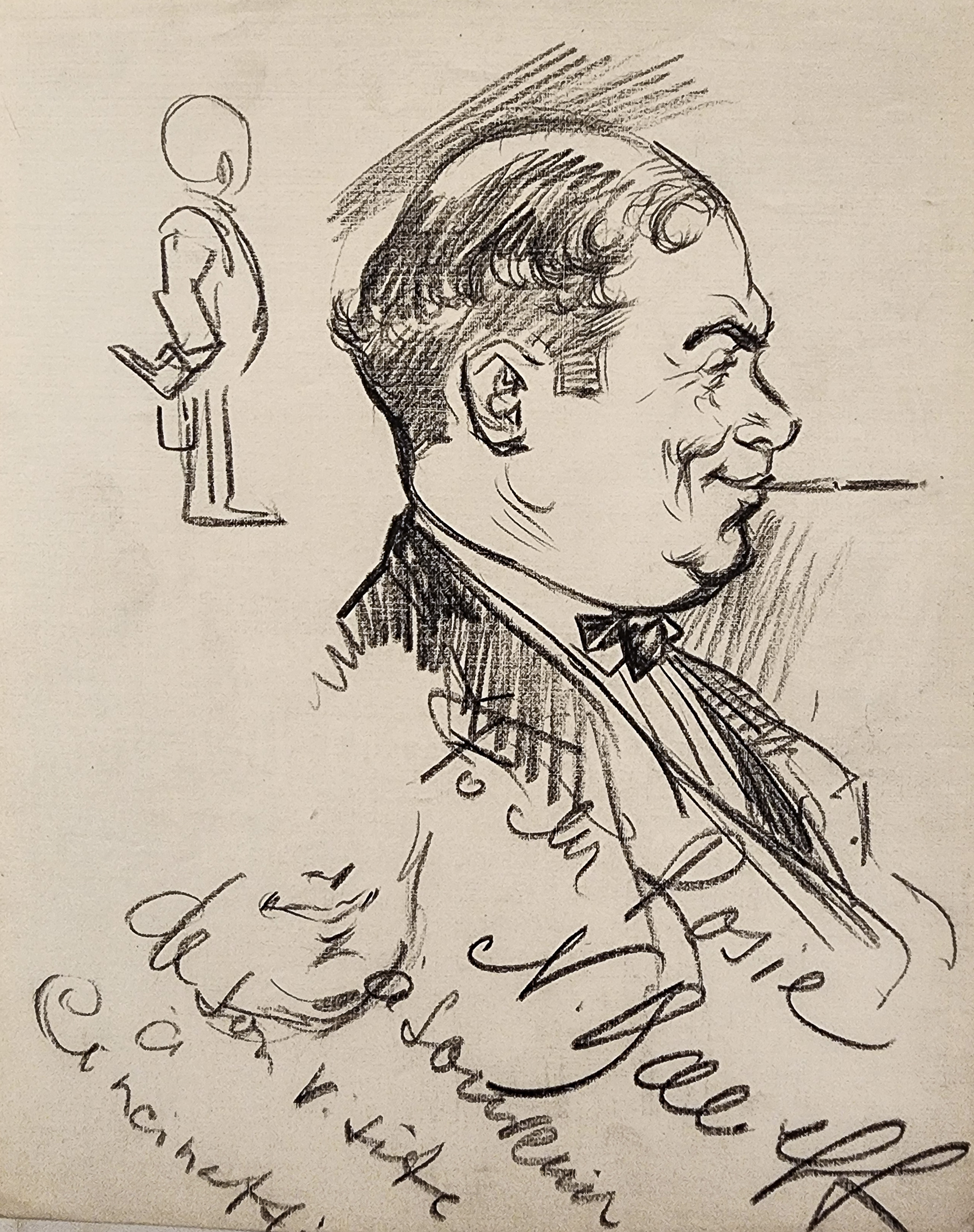
Signed drawing by Manuel Rosenberg 1927

Balieff died of a kidney ailment on 3 September 1936, aged 63, at the Park West Hospital on West 76th Street in Manhattan. His funeral was held at the Russian Orthodox Church of Christ the Savior on Madison Avenue. Members of the Russian Opera Company sang and nearly 1,000 people attended the service, including members of the Russian nobility. Balieff is buried in Mount Olivet Cemetery, Maspeth, Queens, New York. His caricature was drawn by Alex Gard for the famed Sardi's Restaurant, where well-known performers often congregated during the Broadway season, and where many well-known stage actors' caricatures hang. The signed drawing is now housed in the Billy Rose Theatre Division of the New York Public Library for the Performing Arts.

== Sources ==
- The New York Times, "The Last Laugh Out of Russia", January 15, 1922
- Time Magazine, "New Revue in Manhattan", August 23, 1943
