= Eve's Daughter =

- Directed by: James Kirkwood
- Written by: Margaret Turnbull (scenario)
- Based on: Eve's Daughter by Alicia Ramsey
- Produced by: Adolph Zukor; Jesse L. Lasky
- Cinematography: Lawrence E. Williams
- Production company: Famous Players–Lasky
- Distributed by: Paramount Pictures
- Release date: March 4, 1918
- Running time: 5 reels
- Country: United States
- Language: Silent (English intertitles)

Eve's Daughter is a 1918 American silent comedy-drama film produced by Famous Players–Lasky and distributed by Paramount Pictures. The film was directed by James Kirkwood and starred popular theatre star Billie Burke.

The film is based on the 1917 Broadway play Eve's Daughter by Alicia Ramsey which starred Grace George.

It is now considered to be a lost film.

== Cast ==
- Billie Burke as Irene Simpson-Bates
- Thomas Meighan as John Norton
- Lionel Atwill as Courtenay Urquhart
- Riley Hatch as Martin Simpson
- Florence Flinn as Victoria Vanning
- Harriet Ross as Mrs. Simpson-Bates
- Lucille Carney as Edith Simpson-Bates
- Mary Navarro as Kate Simpson-Bates (aka Mary Anderson)
- Harry Lee as Reverend James Sunningdale
- Clarence Doyle
- Jimmie Gormon
- Ivy Shannon

== Reception ==
Like many American films of the time, Eve's Daughter was subject to cuts by city and state film censorship boards. For example, the Chicago Board of Censors cut, in Reel 3, two scenes of man rubbing woman's arm (one in drawing room and other in dining room), Reel 4, the intertitle "My pal. Alice Duveen went to Paris with him", man rubbing woman's arm on couch, and, Reel 5, the three intertitles "It need make no difference to us", "You'll look after me like Alice Duveen", and "I thought you understood. I can't marry you."
