= The Parade of the Tin Soldiers =

1897 song

- by Leon Jessel
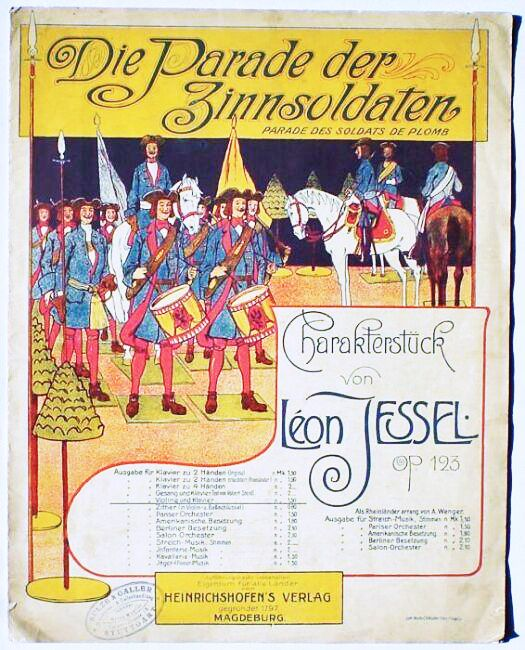
- Early sheet music published in Germany as Op.123
- Native name: Die Parade der Zinnsoldaten
- Genre: March
- Composed: 1897

The Parade of the Tin Soldiers (Die Parade der Zinnsoldaten), also known as The Parade of the Wooden Soldiers (Die Parade der Holzsoldaten), is an instrumental musical character piece, in the form of a popular jaunty march, written by German composer Leon Jessel, in 1897.

The Parade of the Tin Soldiers was originally composed for solo piano. Jessel later published it for orchestra in 1905, as Opus 123. Today, it is also a popular tune for marching bands, concert bands, and small orchestras, and for extremely diverse alternate instrumentations as well.

Since the early 1920s, the piece has been very popular in the U.S., and has also been frequently performed and recorded worldwide. A song, "The Parade of the Wooden Soldiers", was also created from the piece in 1922, with English lyrics by Ballard MacDonald.

== Rise to international popularity ==
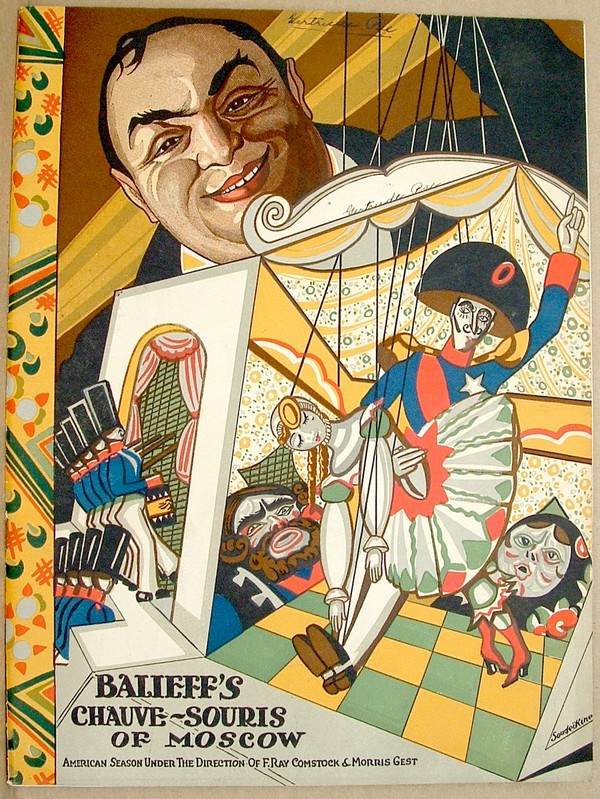
1922 U.S. La Chauve-Souris program cover, with the famous "Wooden Soldiers" marching (left)

1922 U.S. sheet music

Piano version

Recordings of The Parade of the Tin Soldiers were made in late 1910 and in 1911 and distributed internationally, and Jessel republished the sheet music internationally as well in 1911. In 1912, John Philip Sousa and his band played it at the Hippodrome Theatre in New York City.

In 1911, Russian impresario Nikita Balieff chose Jessel's whimsically rakish Parade of the Tin Soldiers for a choreography routine in his The Bat vaudeville revue, changing the title to "The Parade of the Wooden Soldiers". Balieff's wooden-soldier choreography referenced a legend regarding Tsar Paul I: that he left his parade grounds without issuing a "halt" order to the marching soldiers, so they marched to Siberia before being remembered and ordered back.

In December 1920 Nikita Balieff's La Chauve-Souris (The Bat) revue reached Paris, and in 1922 it was brought to Broadway. Balieff's choreographed wooden-soldiers showpiece, with Jessel's tune, was a mainstay of his long-running U.S. production.

Balieff's Chauve-Souris routine greatly popularized Jessel's music, and in 1922 multiple editions of the sheet music were published in the U.S. — in fox-trot, march, and concert arrangements, and for numerous instrumentations: voice and piano, with lyrics by Ballard MacDonald; male quartet; small orchestra; full orchestra; violin, piano, and cello; military band; mandolin solo; mandolin and guitar; mandolin and piano; and mandolin, guitar, and piano. In 1923, Lee DeForest filmed The Parade of the Wooden Soldiers, performed by Balieff's company, in the DeForest Phonofilm sound-on-film process. The film premiered on April 15, 1923 at the Rivoli Theater in New York City, and is now in the Maurice Zouary collection at the Library of Congress.

In 1922, the instrumental version of The Parade of the Wooden Soldiers was a hit single performed by Carl Fenton's Orchestra, and the song was a hit for the Vincent Lopez Orchestra that same year. Paul Whiteman and his Orchestra recorded and acoustic version in 1923 and had a hit with an electrical version in 1928.

A Betty Boop cartoon, Parade of the Wooden Soldiers, was created with the music in 1933. Also in 1933, The Rockettes began annually performing their own choreographed version of the piece, based on Balieff's original, in their Radio City Christmas Spectacular. The song featured in the 1938 Shirley Temple vehicle Rebecca of Sunnybrook Farm, and the melody was used that same year in the Disney cartoon Polar Trappers to accompany a scene where penguins march behind Donald Duck as he tries to lure them to a trap.

== Song ==
Though far less often heard than Jessel's original instrumental piece, Ballard MacDonald wrote English song lyrics for the tune, in 1922.

The toy shop door is locked up tight
And everything is quiet for the night.
And suddenly the clock strikes twelve,
The fun's begun!
The dolls are in their best arrayed,
There's going to be a wonderful parade.
Hark to the drum,
Oh, here they come, cries everyone

Hear them all cheering,
Now they are nearing,
There's the captain stiff as starch.
Bayonets flashing,
Music is crashing,
As the wooden soldiers march;
Sabers a-clinking,
Soldiers a-winking,
At each pretty little maid.

Here they come!
Here they come!
Here they come!
Here they come!
Wooden soldiers on parade.

Daylight is creeping,
Dollies are sleeping.
In the toy shop window fast;
Soldiers so jolly,
Think of each dolly,
Dreaming of the night that's past.

When in the morning,
Without a warning,
Toyman pulls the window shade,

There's no sign the Wood brigade
Was ever out upon parade.

The song is not seasonal per se but is often used as a Christmas piece. A version sung by The Crystals is on the 1963 album A Christmas Gift for You from Phil Spector. Harry Connick, Jr. sings it on his 1993 album, When My Heart Finds Christmas. It is also on Disney's Very Merry Christmas Songs VHS and DVD.

== Notable later uses of the instrumental piece ==
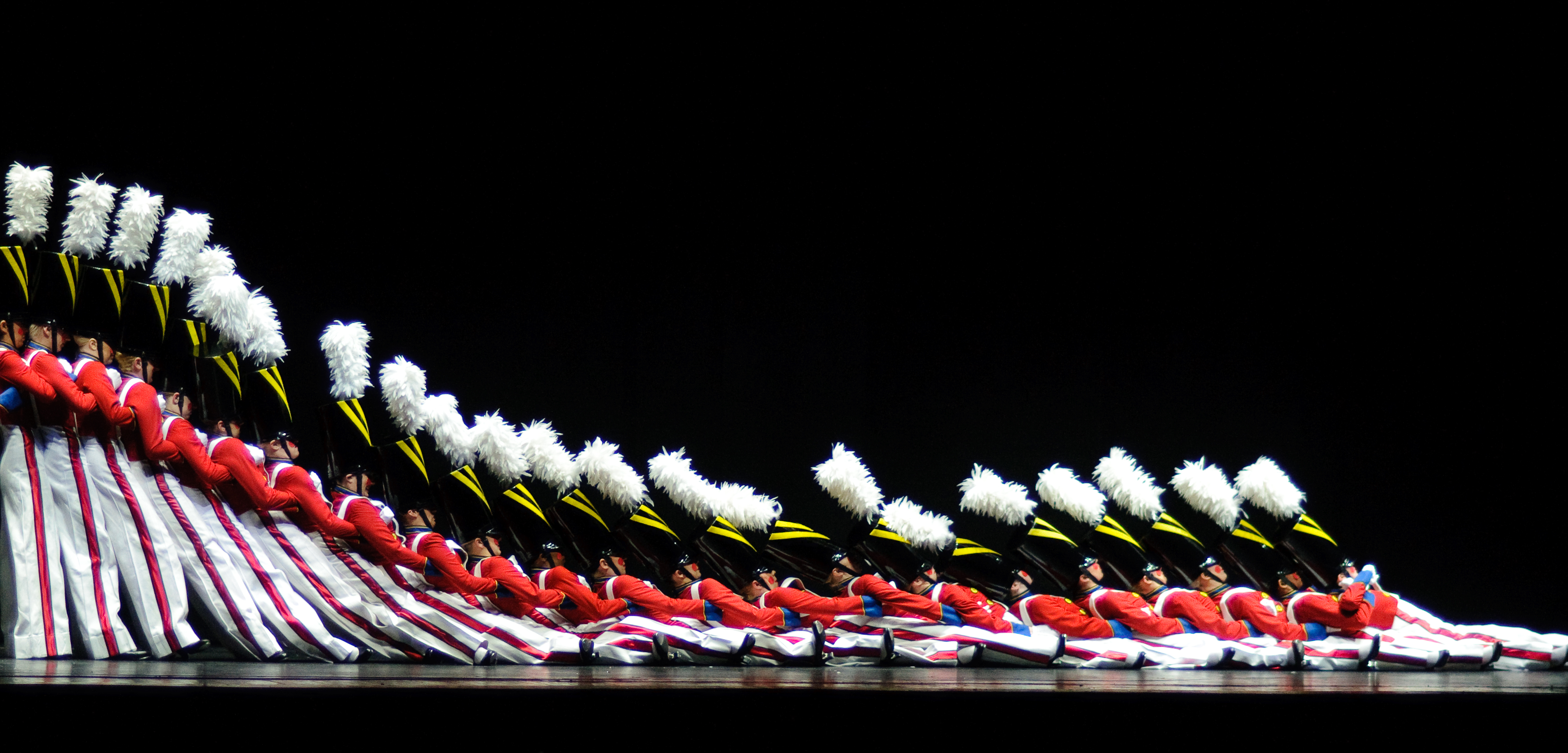
The Parade of the Wooden Soldiers: The Rockettes in the annual Radio City Christmas Spectacular

The Rockettes have been performing their own choreographed version of the piece, based on Balieff's La Chauve-Souris original, since 1933 in their annual Radio City Christmas Spectacular.

The work is a staple of the Boston Pops orchestra. They have recorded it at least 10 times.

In Great Britain, The Parade of the Tin Soldiers was used for many years in BBC radio's Children's Hour to introduce the series Toytown, based on stories by S. G. Hulme Beaman. The recording used was by the New Light Symphony Orchestra.

== See also ==
- Babes in Toyland (operetta) ("March of the Toys")
  - "March of the Wooden Soldiers" ("March of the Toys")
  - Babes in Toyland (1961 film) ("March of the Toys")
- The Nutcracker ("March" in Act 1)
