= Riley Hatch =

American actor

William Riley Hatch
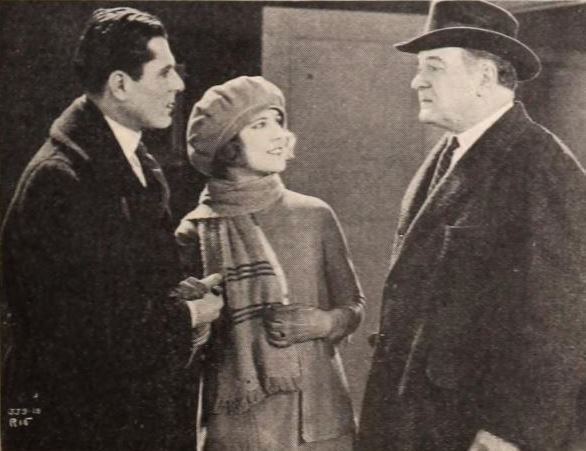
- Warner Baxter, Justine Johnstone and Hatch (right) in Sheltered Daughters, 1921
- Born: September 2, 1862; Cleveland, Ohio
- Died: September 6, 1925 (aged 63); Bay Shore, New York
- Occupations: Actor; Singer

William Riley Hatch (September 2, 1862 – September 6, 1925) was an American singer and actor on stage and in silent films.

Hatch's Broadway debut came in The Burgomaster (1900); his final Broadway appearance was in The Nervous Wreck (1923).

He appeared in films such as At Shiloh (1913), The City (1916), A Case at Law (1917), The Law of the Land (1917), Eve's Daughter (1918), Sheltered Daughters (1921), and Zaza (1923).

On September 6, 1925, Hatch died of heart disease at his home on Long Island.

== Partial filmography ==
- At Shiloh (1913)
- When Rome Ruled (1914)
- Paid in Full (1914)
- The Exploits of Elaine (1914)
- Shore Acres (1914)
- Wildfire (1915)
- The Plunderer (1915)
- The Little Gypsy (1915)
- The City (1916)
- The World's Great Snare (1916)
- The Lone Wolf (1917)
- The Law of the Land (1917)
- Double Crossed (1917)
- A Case at Law (1917)
- Blind Man's Luck (1917)
- Eve's Daughter (1918)
- From Two to Six (1918)
- Other Men's Daughters (1918)
- Peck's Bad Girl (1918)
- Something Different (1920)
- The Idol of the North (1921)
- Sheltered Daughters (1921)
- The Matrimonial Web (1921)
- Nobody (1921)
- You Find It Everywhere (1921)
- What Women Will Do (1921)
- The Conquest of Canaan (1921)
- Missing Millions (1922)
- If Winter Comes (1923)
- Little Old New York (1923)
- Zaza (1923)
- West of the Water Tower (1923)
- You Are Guilty (1923)
- Trouping with Ellen (1924)
- America (1924)
- The Street of Forgotten Men (1925)
