= Morris Gest =

American theatre producer (1875–1942)

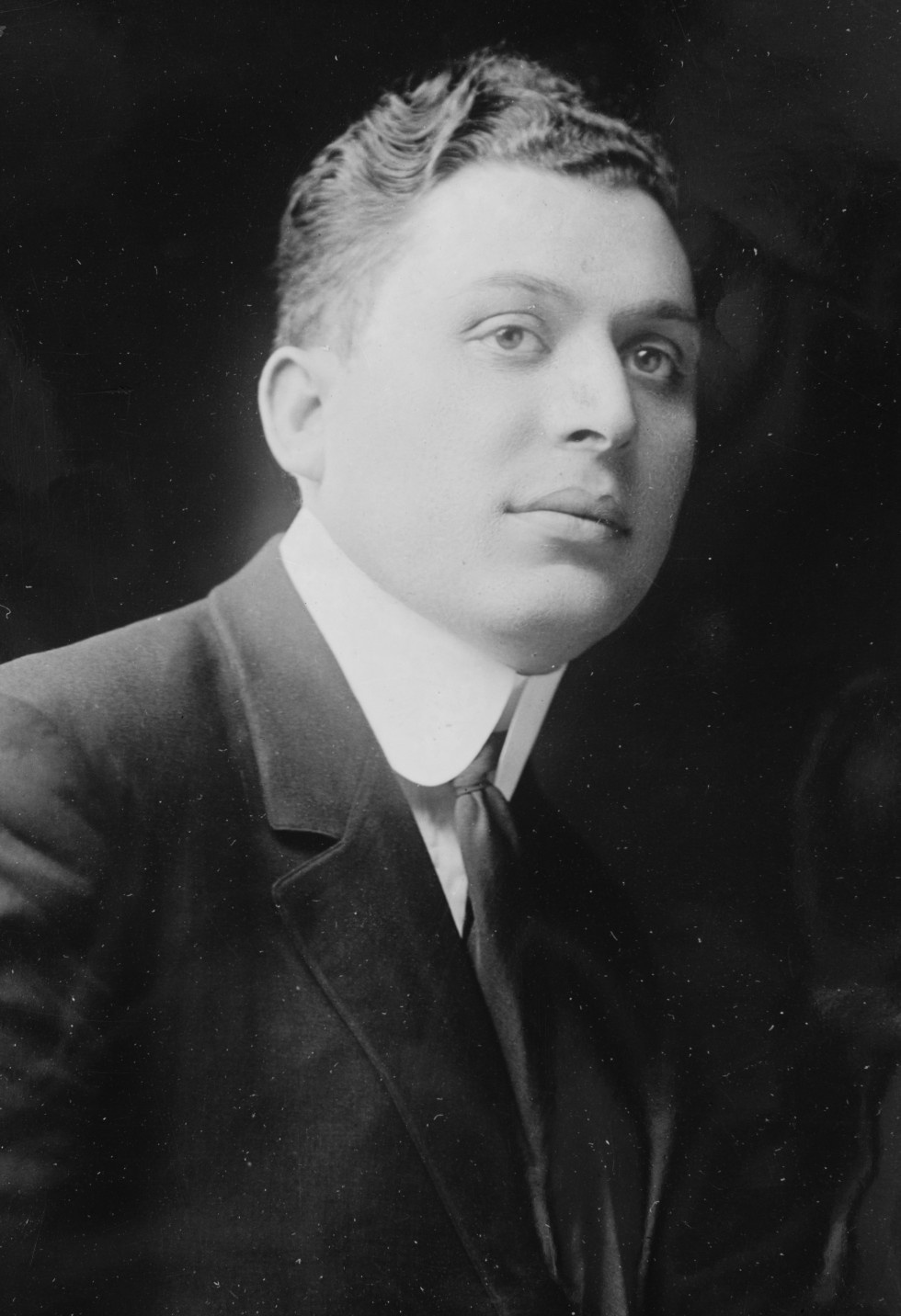
Morris Gest, 1923

Morris Gest (also Maurice Guest, March 15, 1875 – May 16, 1942) was an American theatrical producer of the early 20th century.

== Early life ==
Moishe Gershnowitz was born near Vilna in the Russian Empire (present-day Lithuania), the son of Leon and Elizabeth Gershonovitz. Through his mother he was a member of the middle-class Michliszanski clan which included his cousin, later renamed as Bernard Berenson, the art historian.

A couple were emigrating to Boston and agreed to take him with them in 1890. Later, he attracted the attention of Mr. Thompson, for whom he worked in the library of the United States District Court who saw to it that he went to school.

== Career ==
The theatre was the first job that came Gest's way and he gained experience in most of the skills involved in Boston's theatres. In 1901, he went to New York and worked for Oscar Hammerstein at the Manhattan Opera House and was promoted to foreign representative. He also produced Broadway shows such as Morris Gest's Midnight Whirl (1919) with music by George Gershwin and lyrics by Buddy DeSylva and John Henry Mears.

After some false starts in production by himself, he teamed up with F. Ray Comstock and in the 1920s made his reputation by the import of Russian productions from the post-Revolutionary regime. They first staged a faux-Oriental spectacle entitled Aphrodite, which ran for 148 performances in 1919-20. Despite contributions by Michel Fokine (choreography) and Léon Bakst (costumes), it “displayed a gorgeous exterior, but was hollow inside.” In 1922 and 1923, Gest and Comstock presented Nikita Balieff's company "La Chauve-Souris". They also presented the Moscow Art Theatre directed by Konstantin Stanislavski which reigned over New York drama despite the handicap of Russian dialogue. In 1923, he organised the last U.S. tour of Eleanor Duse.

In 1924, he brought Max Reinhardt from Germany to stage The Miracle to which Gest brought his own talents in publicity and casting. These were well needed as the heavy costs of the sets, costumes, and cast of 175 could have meant financial disaster.

In 1929, he put on Broadway, a presentation of “The Passion Play”.

== Later life ==
The Great Depression and the parting from Comstock seem to have curbed his productions for five years but there was a last production, Lady Precious Stream in 1936. The same year marked the onset of a nervous breakdown. However he recovered sufficiently to be involved in the "Morris Gest's Little Miracle Town: with the world's greatest midget artistes". This was in connection with the 1939 New York World's Fair.

All the participants were midgets that Gest had brought from Germany, and the entire project was seen as a tawdry freak show, a sad commentary on the life of the producer who, in the 1920s, had introduced America to European high art.

He died on May 16, 1942. His widow, Reina, the daughter of David Belasco, died in 1948.
