= Jennifer Jones (Rockette) =

American dancer and actress (born 1967)

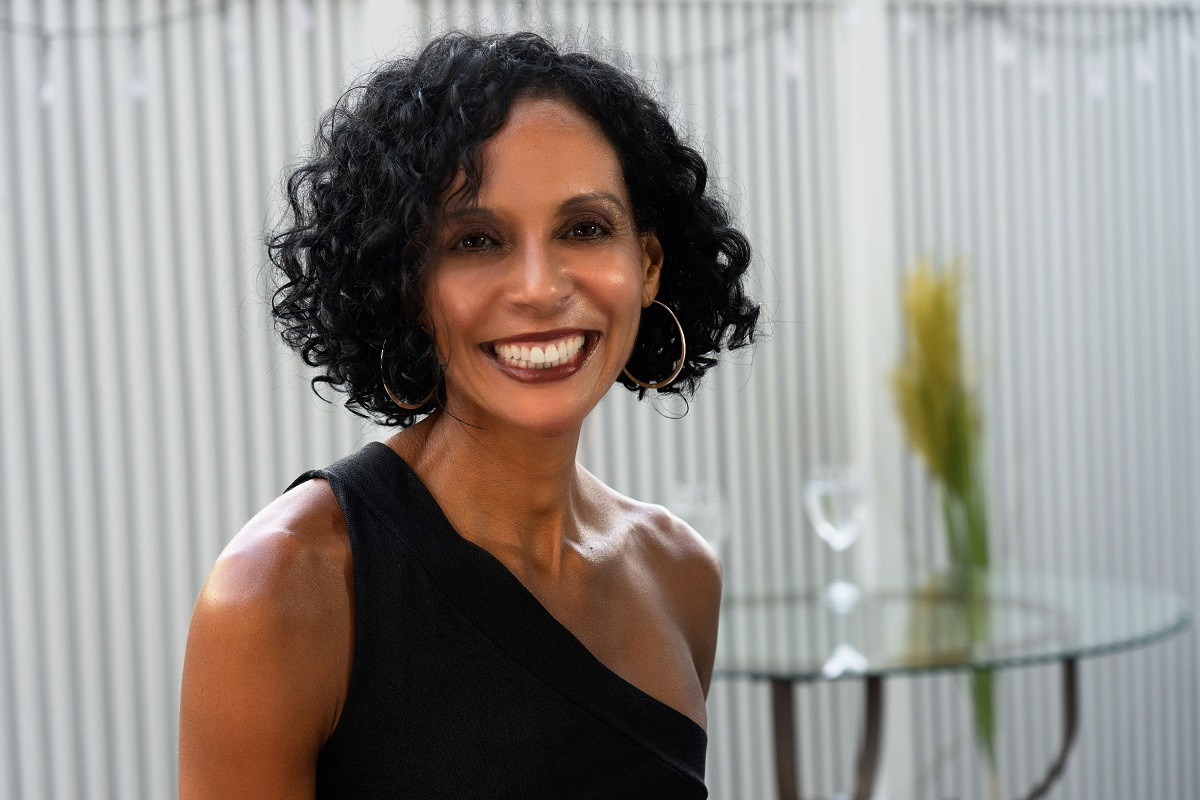
Jennifer Jones (2018)

Jennifer Jones (born August 1, 1967) is an American dancer and actress. In 1987, she became the first African American Radio City Music Hall Rockette.

== Life and education ==
Jones was born on August 1, 1967, in Newark, New Jersey and was raised in Randolph, where she attended Randolph High School and County College of Morris.

== Radio City Music Hall Rockettes ==
In 1987, when she was 20 years old, Jones auditioned to be a Radio City Music Hall Rockette at a Rockettes Open Call. She made the cut and became the dance company's first African American Rockette in its then-62-year history. She was chosen out of 221 women who had auditioned for the 26 open spots on the coveted line. Out of the 23 other women who were contracted for on-call vacancies in the New York City production, she was the only African American.

At 5 feet 8 inches (1.73 m) tall, she fulfilled the RCMH requirement that its Rockette dancers must be between 5 ft 6 in (1.68 m) and 5 ft 10.5 in (1.791 m) in stocking feet, as well as being proficient in ballet, tap, and jazz repertory. Other requirements, according to The New York Times, included, "a slender figure, long legs, and the ability to perform 20 eye-level kicks while retaining proper posture".

She had a fifteen-year career with the RCMH Rockettes, which included a national tour and televised performances such as Comic Relief IV, an HBO TV special from May 12, 1990, filmed at Radio City Music Hall, which featured Billy Crystal, Whoopi Goldberg, and Robin Williams with the RCMH Rockettes.

In 2002, she retired and joined the Rockette Alumnae Association.

=== Color barrier ===
Jones crossing the color barrier in 1987 ended a longstanding Radio City Music Hall policy against hiring African Americans for its Rockettes' chorus line so as not to distract from its hallmark of perfectly-synchronized precision and rigid color uniformity. The rule was set-down in 1925 by Russell E. Markert when he founded the Rockettes dance company in St. Louis with its chorus line modeled on the precision dance style inspired by early 20th century dance troupes such as the Ziegfeld Follies and the Folies Bergère.

As its chief choreographer, Markert sought absolute precision and uniformity in the movements of the dancers through syncopated, intricate steps based on soft-shoe and tap. Every dancer was required to move as one unit. Markert also forbade his dancers from sun-tanning, explaining that, "it would make her [the dancer] look like a colored girl."

Markert's guidelines extended eight decades into the 20th century. In 1982, its director and choreographer, Violet Holmes, defended the RCMH Rockettes' lack of diversity on artistic grounds when questioned by The New York Times on why no African American dancer had ever been chosen for the line. Holmes explained that the Rockettes had a rich history as a precision line, and its girls needed to act as mirror images on the stage. She continued, "One or two black girls in the line would definitely distract. You would lose the look of precision, which is the hallmark of the Rockettes."

The company faced backlash from civil rights organizations such as the NAACP and the City Council's Black and Hispanic Caucus for its lack of diversity, particularly noticeable against New York City's multicultural landscape. The chairwoman of the New York City Human Rights, Marcella Maxwell, opined that the Rockettes were not fully reflecting the richness of New York City's diverse racial and ethnic populations, but underlined that no discrimination complaints had been filed against the company for its longstanding policy.

Radio City Music Hall countered the criticism, stating that the lack of diversity was based on the infrequency and rarity of Rockettes' job openings, and that when auditions were advertised, they specifically placed ads in black, Hispanic, and Asian publications to encourage minority dancers to audition.

=== National debut ===
Jones' national debut with the RCMH Rockettes was on Sunday, January 31, 1988 during the National Football League Super Bowl XXII halftime show at Jack Murphy Stadium in San Diego, in a game between the Washington Redskins and the Denver Broncos. Produced by Radio City Music Hall, the theme was "Something Grand", and was intended to break from the "traditional baton-twirling approach" of past halftime shows, as explained by Barnett Lipton, Radio City Music Hall's special events coordinator. He added that the theme was a spinoff of the year 1988. "We've come up with a show that's all 88 – 88 pianos, each with 88 keys, and the 88 greatest legs in show business."

The 12-minute spectacle showcased 1,200 performers, which included 44 Rockettes, 400 swing band members, 300 Jazzercisers, 88 tuxedoed pianists simultaneously playing on 88 Kimball grand pianos, and two college marching bands (San Diego State and USC). R&B singer Chubby Checker sang his hit song, The Twist. The pianists performed an adapted version of Edvard Grieg's Piano Concerto in A minor, Op. 16, accompanied by the Radio City Music Hall Rockettes.

== Awards and recognition ==
=== Tony Award ===
During Jones' penultimate year with the RCMH Rockettes, she performed in the ensemble of the 2001 Broadway revival of 42nd Street, which won the Tony Award for Best Revival of a Musical that year. She was one of three African American women to be cast in the show.

=== The Harlem City Music Hall Dance Spectacular ===
In 2016, Jones was honored by The Harlem School of the Arts with a world premiere tribute called "The Harlem City Music Hall Dance Spectacular", written and directed by Aubrey Lynch II, the school's dance director. The show was inspired by Jones' RCMH Rockettes legacy and barrier-breaking milestone, and featured The Harlemettes, The Harlem Rockets, and the Harlem School of the Arts Dance students. The story followed Little JJ on her quest to becoming a Rockette, an aspirational allegory of how dreams can be realized through determination, courage, hard work, and talent. At the event, Jones acknowledged that by crossing the color barrier with the RCMH Rockettes, she had paved the way for the next generation of trailblazers.

=== O Mag Insider appointment ===
In August 2018, Jones was appointed an "O Mag Insider" by O, The Oprah Magazine.

=== Author and doll maker ===
Jones has also garnered recognition for her children's book On the Line: My Story of Becoming the First African American Rockette, documenting her journey in dance in 2023. Jones released her autobiography, Becoming Spectacular: The Rhythm of Resilience from the First African American Rockette, in 2025.

== Personal life ==
Jones has been a resident of West Orange, New Jersey. She was inducted as an honorary member of Sigma Gamma Rho on July 24, 2026, at their 61st Biennial Boule in Tampa, Florida.
