= The Little Gypsy =

1915 film

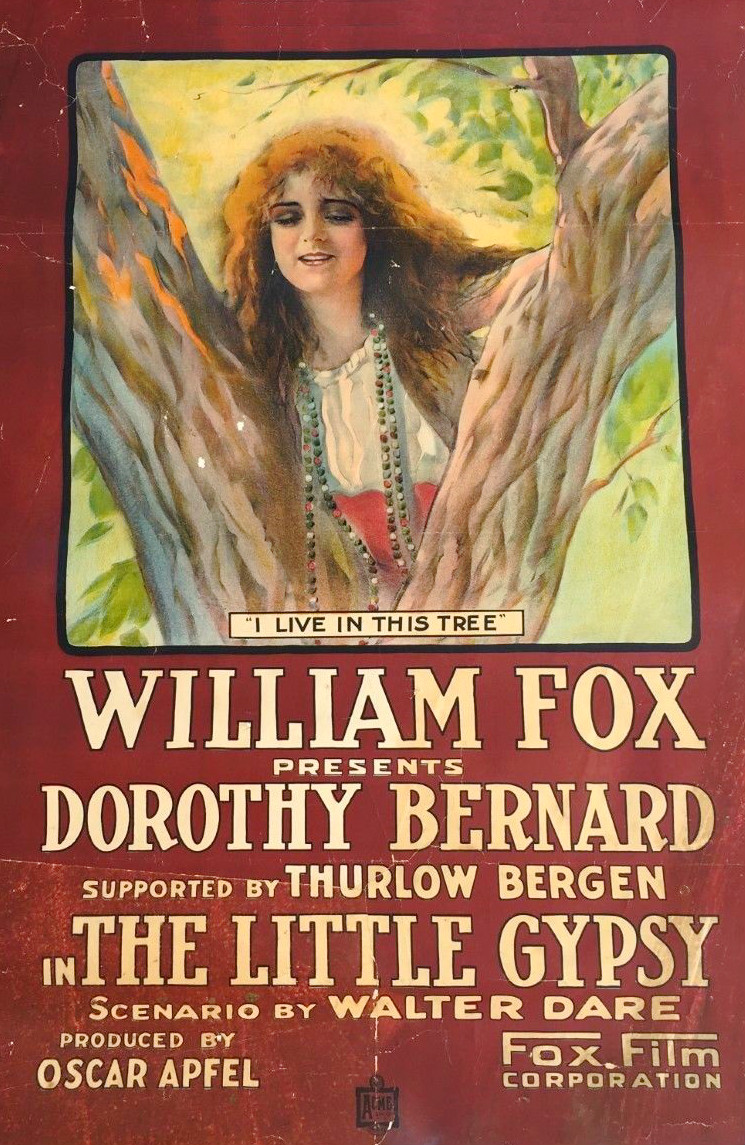
- Directed by: Oscar Apfel
- Written by: Mary Murillo
- Produced by: William Fox
- Starring: Dorothy Bernard
- Cinematography: Alfredo Gandolfi
- Distributed by: Fox Film Corporation
- Release date: October 10, 1915
- Running time: 50 minutes
- Country: USA
- Language: Silent..English intertitles

The Little Gypsy is a lost 1915 silent film drama directed by Oscar Apfel and starring Dorothy Bernard. It was produced by William Fox and released through Fox Film Corporation.

== Cast ==
- Dorothy Bernard - Babbie
- Thurlow Bergen - Gavin
- Raymond Murray -
- W. J. Herbert -
- Bradley Barker -
- Julia Hurley -
- Riley Hatch -

== See also ==
- 1937 Fox vault fire
