= Nikolai Tarasov =

Armenian-Russian oil-industrialist and dandy

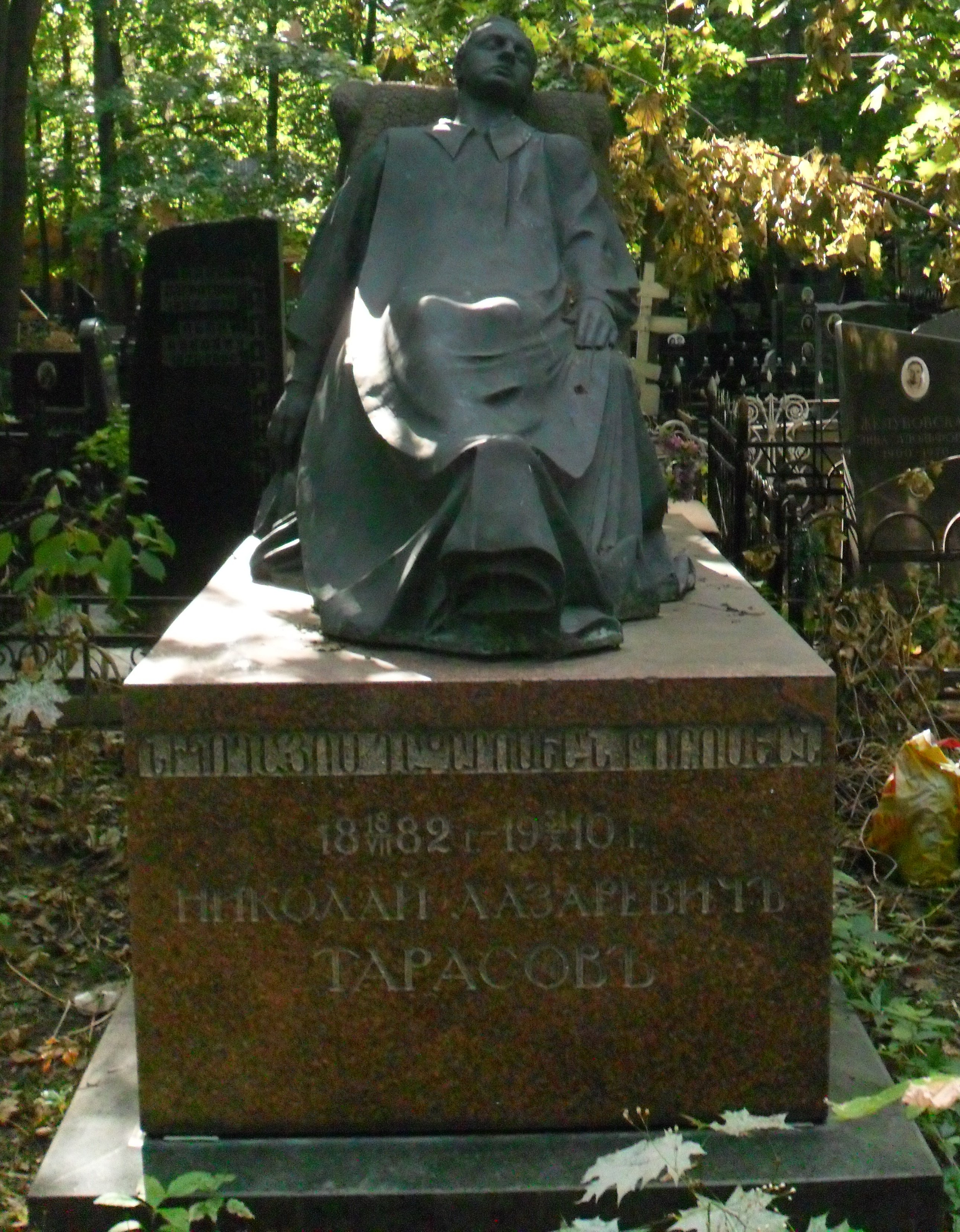
Tarasov's tomb

Nikolai Lazarevich Tarasov (Armenian: Նիկողայոս Ղազարոսեան Թորոսեան, 1882, Moscow – October 1910, Moscow) was an Armenian–Russian oil-industrialist and dandy, who was a devotee of the theatre.

== Biography ==
He was born as Nikoghayos Torosian in a family of Armenian traders from Armavir. From 1906 he financially supported Moscow Art Theatre and became a member of theatre's direction. In 1908, along with his friend Nikita Balieff, he co-founded the Moscow Bat theatre (La Chauve-Souris), to organise comedy evenings for members of the Arts Theatre.

He committed suicide in 1910. Tarasov's tomb at the Moscow Armenian Cemetery is a modernist style work by sculptor Nikolai Andreev.

== Links ==
- History of three suicides
