= The Stain (film) =

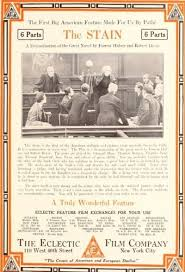
- Theatrical release poster
- Directed by: Frank Powell
- Written by: Forrest Halsey (scenario)
- Starring: Edward José; Thurlow Bergen
- Production company: Pathé Exchange
- Distributed by: Eclectic Film Company
- Release date: July 17, 1914
- Running time: 6 reels (75 mins.)
- Country: United States
- Languages: Silent; English intertitles

The Stain is a 1914 American silent drama film directed by Frank Powell and starring Edward José and Thurlow Bergen. Its cast also includes Theda Bara in her screen debut, although she is credited under her birth name Theodosia Goodman. The production was shot at Fox Studios in Fort Lee, New Jersey and on location in Lake Ronkonkoma, New York. A print of the film was discovered in Australia in the 1990s and is preserved at the George Eastman House. Apart from a 20 second snippet on YouTube the full film hasn't been released to the public yet.

== Plot ==
The film is a melodrama that explores themes of heredity and crime. The story follows an ambitious bank teller named Stevens who, in a moment of temptation and poverty, steals a large customer deposit to fund his dream of becoming a lawyer. He abandons his wife and daughter and starts a new life under an assumed name.

Years later, he has become a respected judge and a candidate for governor. Meanwhile, his abandoned wife remains destitute and is forced to put their daughter into an orphanage. The daughter is adopted, grows up, and becomes a secretary to an honest young lawyer who is challenging the judge's political ambitions.

In a twist of fate, the daughter exhibits the same "stain" of criminal tendency as her father and is arrested for shoplifting a bracelet. She is brought before her own father, the judge, who is unaware of her true identity. During the trial, the abandoned wife arrives and recognizes her former husband. The shock of the revelation and the ensuing confrontation lead to a dramatic courtroom climax.

== Cast ==
- Edward José as Stevens (later The Judge)
- Thurlow Bergen as The Young Lawyer
- Virginia Pearson as Stevens' daughter
- Eleanor Woodruff as Stevens' wife
- Sam Ryan as The Political Boss
- Theda Bara (as Theodosia Goodman) as Gang Moll
- Creighton Hale as Office Clerk

== See also ==
- List of rediscovered films
