= Christmas Spectacular Starring the Radio City Rockettes =

Annual musical stage show in New York City

- Company: MSG Entertainment
- Genre: Musical
- Show type: Annual holiday production
- Date of premiere: December 21, 1933
- Location: Radio City Music Hall; New York City

Creative team
- Director & Choreographer: Julie Branam
- Writer: Mark Waldrop
- Lyricist: Mark Waldrop
- Composers: Gary Adler; Mark Hummel
- Set Designer: Patrick Fahey; 8 Hands High Inc.
- Costume Designers: Frank Krenz; Gregg Barnes; Martin Pakledinaz
- Sound Designer: SCK Sound Design
- Lighting Designer: David Agress
- Musical Director: Fred Lassen
- Official website

The Christmas Spectacular Starring the Radio City Rockettes is an annual musical holiday stage show presented at Radio City Music Hall in New York City. The 90-minute show features more than 140 performers and an original musical score, and combines singing, dancing, and humor with traditional scenes. The star performers are the women's precision dance troupe the Rockettes. Since the first version was presented in 1933, the show has become a New York Christmas tradition.

== History ==
The "Christmas Spectacular" began in 1933 when the Music Hall presented lavish live stage shows along with the latest Hollywood feature films. The first Christmas show was produced December 21, 1933, along with the RKO musical movie Flying Down to Rio and The Night Before Christmas, a Walt Disney Silly Symphony, and ran for two weeks. This was just one year after the opening of the Music Hall in 1932. The show was created by the Music Hall's stage producer Leon Leonidoff and designer Vincente Minnelli. It consisted of an overture with Ernö Rapée and the Radio City Symphony; a solo on the Mighty Wurlitzer Organ; a performance by Jan Peerce; a Toy Shop Ballet; The Rockettes' performance of "Parade of the Wooden Soldiers", choreographed by their founder, Russell Markert; and "The Living Nativity". These last two scenes have continued in every edition of the annual show up to the present day. The Christmas show, like all the Radio City stage shows, continued to be produced and choreographed by Leonidoff and Markert through the early decades of the Music Hall's history. Later, Peter Gennaro and others produced the annual show.

In addition to the annual Christmas show at Radio City, road companies have presented a touring version in theaters throughout the United States. The first Christmas Spectacular outside of Radio City was presented in Branson, Missouri at the Grand Palace Theatre in 1994. The Rockettes, having been founded in St. Louis (where they were called the Missouri Rockets), returned home for the extravaganza. The successful show launched a national tour the following year. The original touring show was presented in conjunction with Herschend Family Entertainment Corporation and ran from 1994 to 2003. In 2008, a new tour consisting of the 2007 edition was launched, playing at select theaters and arena venues around the country.

In 2007, to celebrate the 75th anniversary of the Christmas show, an entirely new edition of the Radio City Christmas Spectacular was updated, designed, and choreographed under the direction of Linda Haberman. For a brief time, it was one of the few shows playing in New York in December 2007, during a strike which closed most Broadway theaters. This edition of the show was filmed and has been released on DVD.

In 2011, the show was titled The Rockettes Magical Journey. The production featured an updated 3DLIVE scene and new musical numbers in addition to "The Parade of the Wooden Soldiers" and "The Living Nativity." The 2011 program's story focused on the Rockettes as they traveled through the Northern Forest to the castle of the Humbug King who had stolen toys from Santa Claus' workshop. In 2012, a slightly altered version was titled The Rockettes Celebration!, celebrating the 85th anniversary of the Rockettes with an additional scene. In 2013, an updated finale entitled "Snow" replaced "Let Christmas Shine." In 2014, Julie Branam was hired as director and choreographer of the Christmas Spectacular. The 3DLIVE scene was removed and restoring the number "Rag Dolls" as well as adding an updated subplot surrounding Ben and Patrick, two young boys trying to find a Christmas present for their younger sister.

In 2018, the "Snow" number was replaced with a new, updated finale called "Christmas Lights". This year also introduced electronic drones in the show, and multiple numbers in the show were updated with new visual effects.

On August 4, 2020, it was announced that the 2020 production would be canceled due to the COVID-19 pandemic, but an hour special aired called Christmas Spectacular Starring the Radio City Rockettes At Home Holiday Special on December 2, 2020 on NBC.

The show returned in November 2021 and was to run through January 2022, but on December 17, 2021, following a breakthrough COVID case situation cancelling four shows that day, the rest of the 2021 show performances were cancelled for the season.

In 2021, "Snow" was brought back in the show, coming after the "Rag Dolls" number and before the Living Nativity scene.

In 2022, QVC announced that they would become the new sponsor of the Christmas Spectacular. The show received a new updated program that would be handed out to guests before the show. A number of other advertisements towards QVC would be added to the show, such as a large advertisement during the "New York At Christmas" number. The number "Snow" was renamed to "Dance of the Frost Fairies." The Rockettes, now dressed as fairies with wings adorned onto their costumes danced as fairies were projected onto the walls of Radio City. This year also introduced new drones that looked like fairies and flew across the theater.

For the 2024 performance season, the show received new updated visual effects, and a new number "We Need A Little Christmas," which Santa sings as a prelude before the main show starts.

=== Spring shows ===
==== Radio City Spring Spectacular ====
A spring show corresponding to the "Christmas Spectacular", titled the Radio City Spring Spectacular, was produced for several years until 1997. It included the traditional "Easter Parade" number with the Rockettes.

==== Heart and Lights ====
In September 2013, Radio City Music Hall and Madison Square Garden attempted to produce an annual spring corresponding show titled Heart and Lights, which was to be directed and choreographed by Linda Haberman who had been director, choreographer, and artistic director of the Rockettes and the Christmas Spectacular since 2006. The show was scheduled to be performed from March 27 through May 4, 2014; however, one week before previews were to start, the program was canceled. Following several revisions, the show opened as the New York Spring Spectacular, which was directed and choreographed by Warren Carlyle and ran from March 12 to May 7, 2015. Alongside the Rockettes, the show starred Derek Hough and Laura Benanti.

=== Summer shows ===
After the closing of the "New York Spring Spectacular," it was announced the show would return the following year, shifting its run from the spring to the summer months. Directed and choreographed by Mia Michaels and written by Douglas Carter Beane, the program, now called the New York Spectacular, performed from June 15 to August 7, 2016. The show was suspended after the 2016 season and did not return.

== Recordings ==
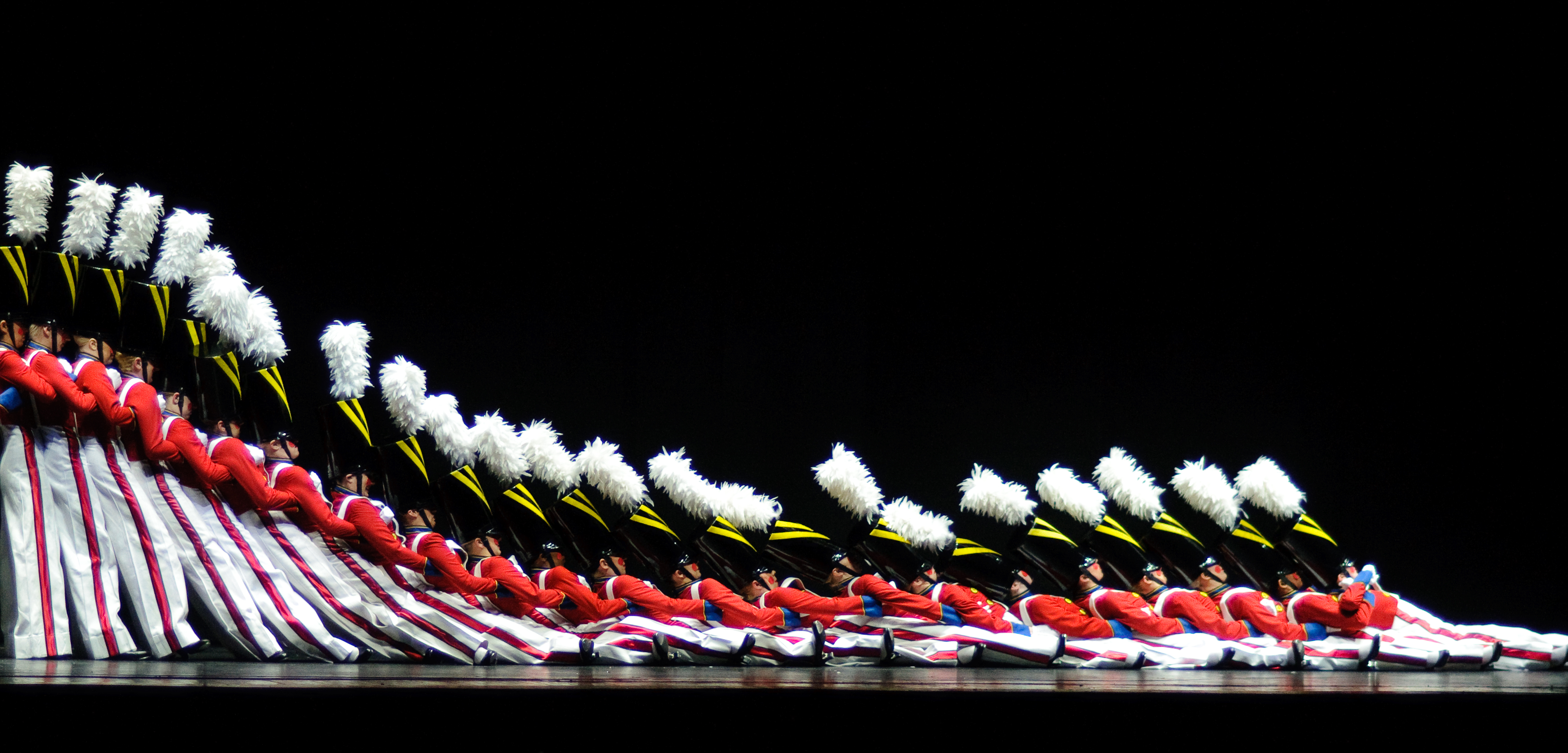
"The Parade of the Wooden Soldiers"

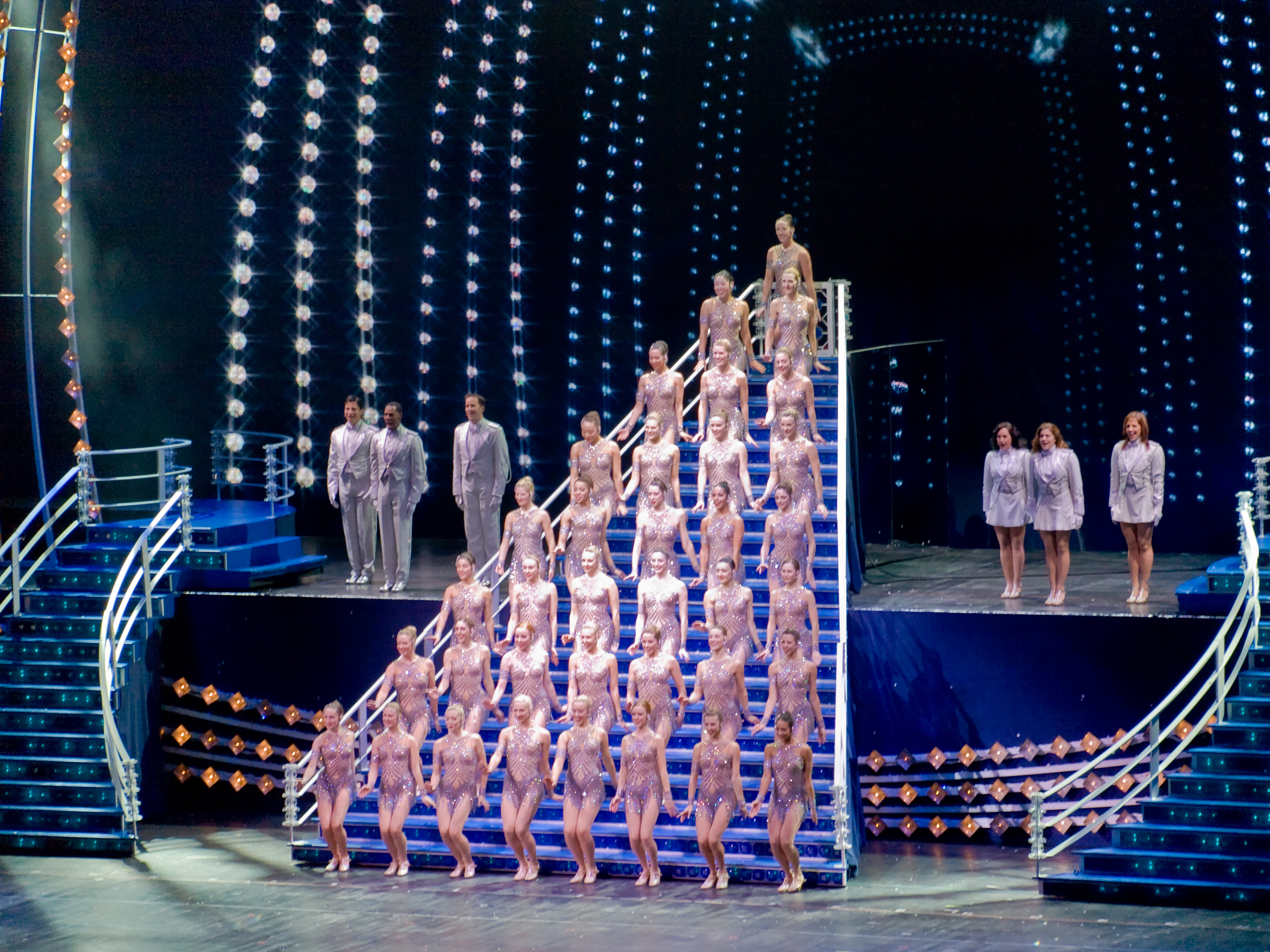
"Let Christmas Shine"

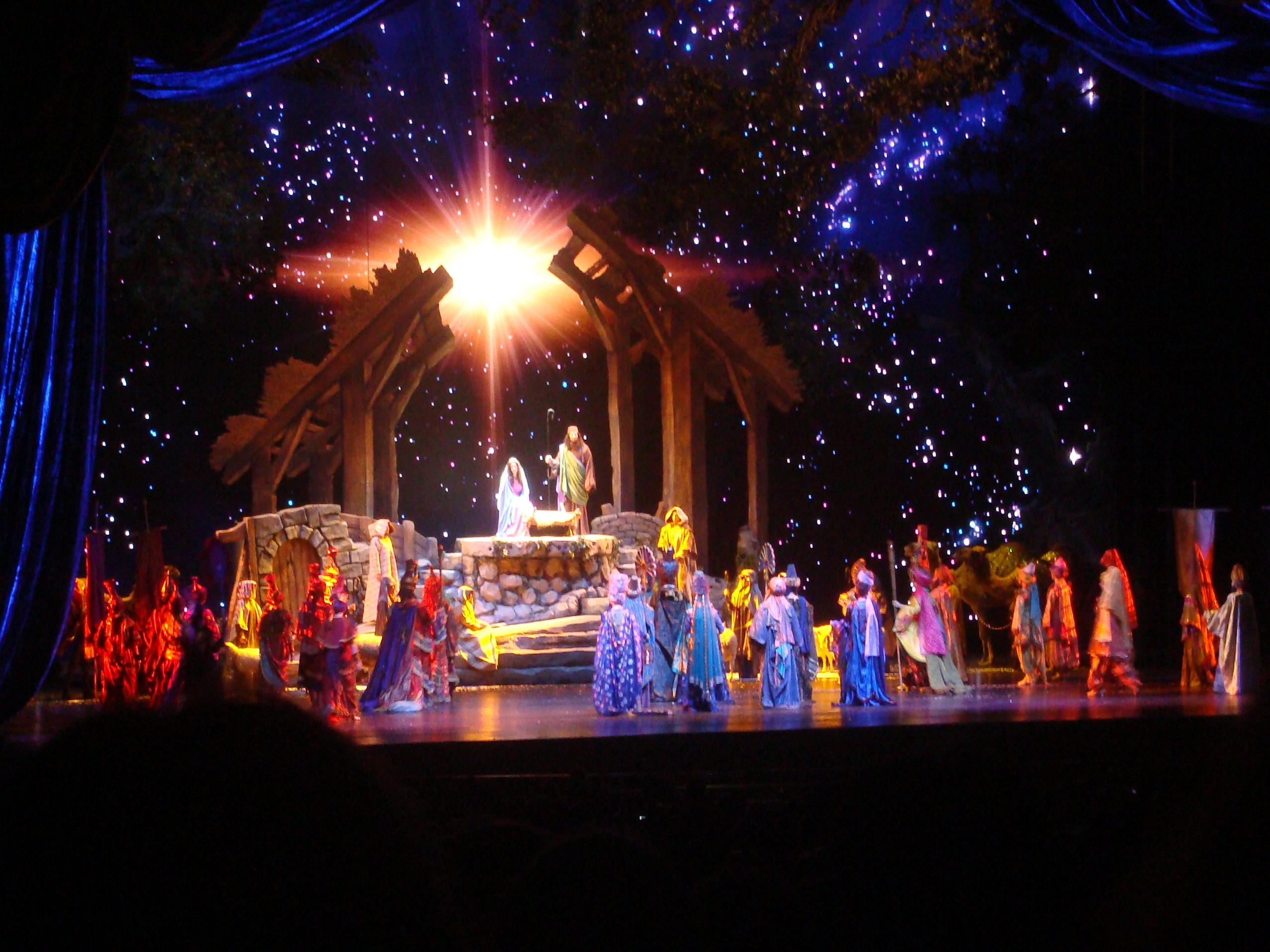
"The Living Nativity"

=== Video ===
==== The Radio City Christmas Spectacular Starring the Rockettes ====
Released by Time Life Entertainment on November 4, 2008, the DVD features the complete 75th anniversary edition of the show, filmed in 2007. A two disc version also includes a behind-the-scenes documentary called Diamond at the Rock. A 60-minute special version premiered on NBC December 1, 2007, hosted by Matt Lauer and Meredith Vieira.

==== Christmas at Radio City Music Hall ====
Produced by HBO in 1986, the show was at the time titled The Magnificent Christmas Spectacular. The special was hosted by Joel Grey and included highlights of the Christmas show along with special performances from Leslie Uggams, Peggy Fleming, and Robin Cousins. The special has never been released to the public commercially, but clips of it can be viewed on YouTube.

=== Audio ===
==== The Radio City Rockettes Sing Your Christmas Favorites (Mega Media, 2008) ====
Produced by Grammy award winner John Porter.

Track listing
No.	Title	Length
1.	"Winter Wonderland"	2:46
2.	"Jingle Bells"	3:24
3.	"Merry Christmas Everybody"	3:31
4.	"Blue Christmas"	2:51
5.	"The Christmas Song"	4:15
6.	"Let it Snow"	2:19
7.	"Santa Claus Is Comin' to Town"	3:12
8.	"Caribbean Christmas"	2:48
9.	"Have Yourself a Merry Little Christmas"	4:28
10.	"Here Comes Santa Claus"	3:16
11.	"Happy Xmas (War Is Over)"	4:00
12.	"Christmas Time Is Here"	3:56
13.	"I Saw Mommy Kissing Santa Claus"	2:42
14.	"White Christmas"	3:22
15.	"Auld Lang Syne"	1:35

==== The Radio City Christmas Spectacular (Sony, 2000) ====
A cast recording of the music from the 1999 and 2000 shows, recorded in 2000.

Track listing
No.	Title	Length
1.	"Overture"	3:05
2.	"Santa's Gonna Rock and Roll"	2:43
3.	"Rockin' Around the Christmas Tree"	2:53
4.	"First Letter/Parade of the Wooden Soldiers"	5:07
5.	"Second Letter/Here Comes Santa Claus"	5:27
6.	"Third Letter/White Christmas in New York"	14:32
7.	"The Man With the Bag"	1:56
8.	"Toyland Ball"	3:15
9.	"Welcome Christmas"	2:22
10.	"Jing-A-Ling/The Reindeer Dance/The Fly-Away"	5:28
11.	"The Living Nativity"	9:56

==== Radio City Music Hall Presents Songs of Christmas (Sony, 1991, out of print) ====
The 1990 edition of the show.

Track listing
No.	Title	Length
1.	"A Christmas Fanfare"	2:10
2.	"Christmas Is Coming"	4:30
3.	"A New York Christmas"	7:42
4.	"Sing a Little Song of Christmas"	2:26
5.	"A Christmas Sleigh Ride"	3:49
6.	"Ringing of the Bells/Carol of the Bells"	3:38
7.	"A Children's Christmas"	3:22
8.	"Christmas Classics"	5:52
9.	"One Solitary Life"	1:41
10.	"The Glory of Christmas"	6:01

==== Christmas Holidays at Radio City Music Hall (CCD, 1958, out of print) ====
Featuring Raymond Paige and the Radio City Music Hall Symphony, Richard Leibert at the Mighty Wurlitzer Organ, and the Radio City Music Hall Choral Ensemble.

Track listing
No.	Title	Length
1.	"Medley #1: Silent Night, O Holy Night, Hark! The Herald Angels Sing, O Come, All Ye Faithful"	8:54
2.	"Cinderella Ballet"	13:45
3.	"The First Noel"	2:23
4.	"Medley #2: I'll Be Home for Christmas, Have Yourself a Merry Little Christmas, Christmas Waltz, Picnic for Strings"	4:27
5.	"Chances Are"	1:48

== Sources ==
- Sherman, Robert B. (1998). Walt's Time: From Before to Beyond. Santa Clarita, Calif.: Camphor Tree. ISBN 0-9646059-3-7.
- Radio City Christmas Spectacular Starring the Rockettes program guide
- The Radio City Rockettes: A dance through time. Published by Msg entertainment 2006.
- Christmas in New York: A Pop-Up Book by Chuck Fischer. Published by Bullfinch Press.
