= The Rockettes =

Precision dance company

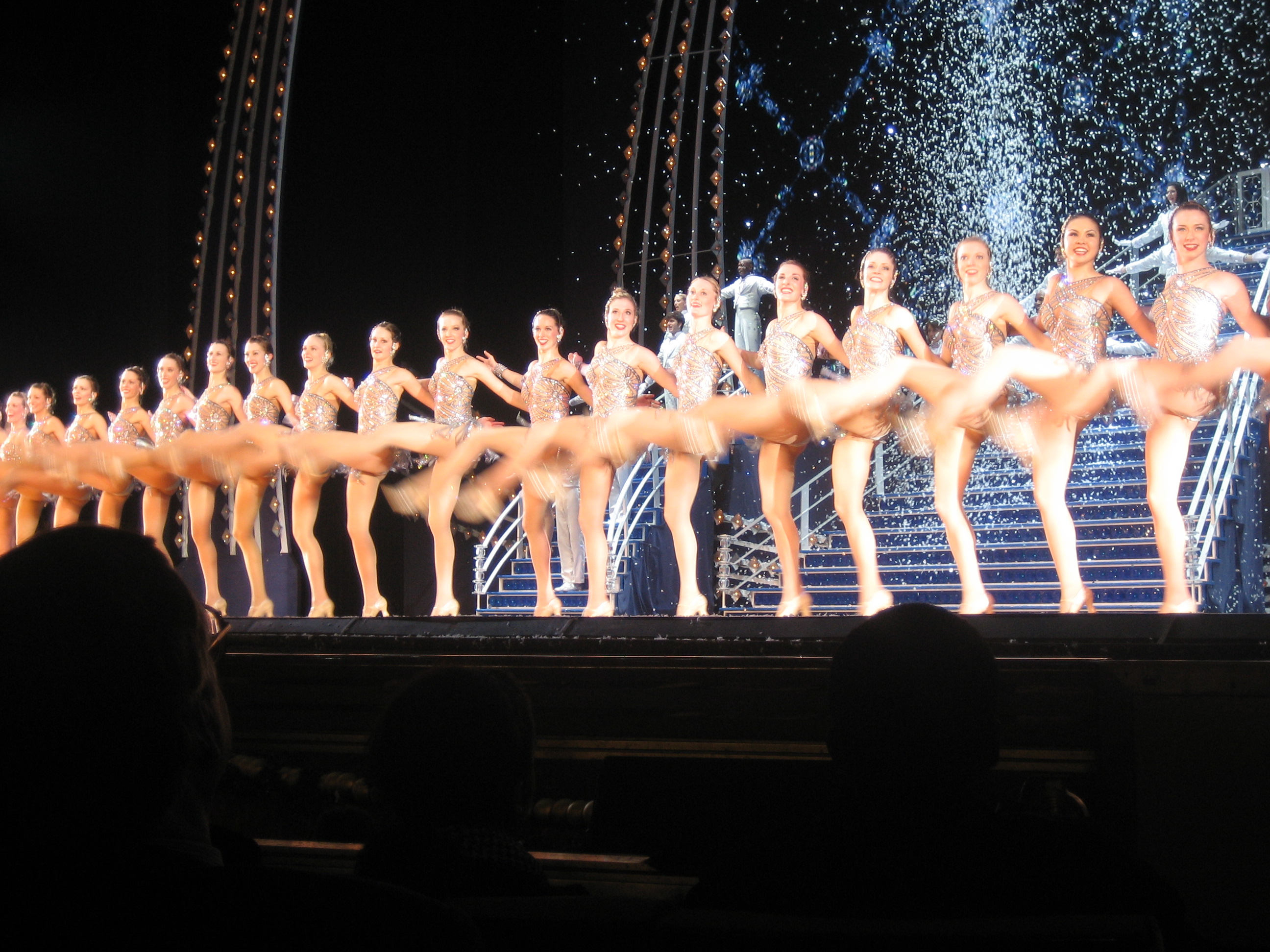
The Rockettes are known for their kickline.

The Radio City Rockettes are an American precision dance company. Founded in 1925 in St. Louis, they have, since 1932, performed at Radio City Music Hall in New York City. Until 2015, they also had a touring company. They are best known for starring in the Radio City Christmas Spectacular, an annual Christmas show, and for performing annually since 1957 at the Macy's Thanksgiving Day Parade in New York.

== History ==
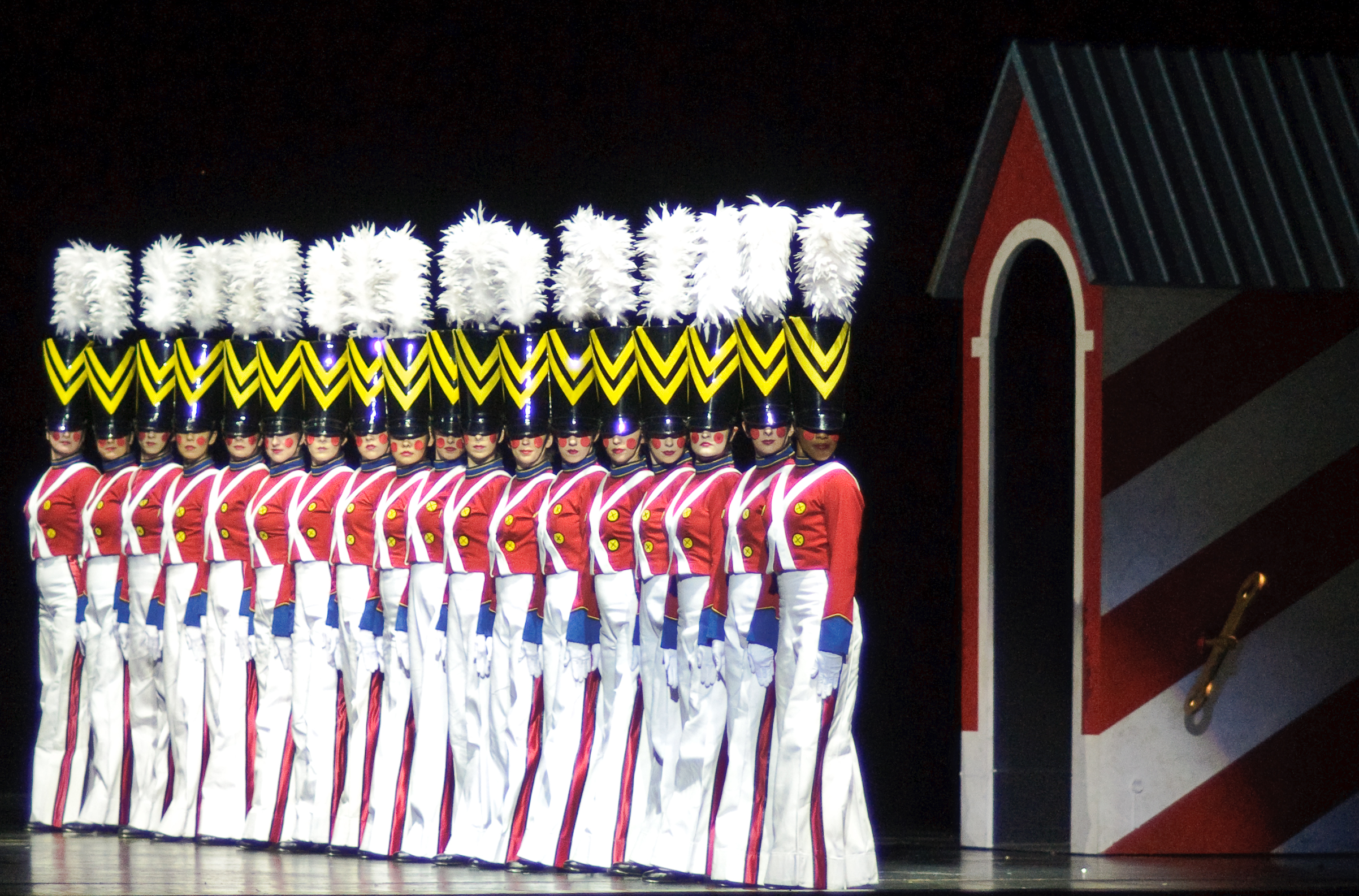
"Parade of the Wooden Soldiers" at the Christmas Spectacular

The Rockettes were originally inspired by the Tiller Girls, a precision dance company of the United Kingdom established by John Tiller in the 1890s. Tiller sent the first troupe of Tiller Girls to perform in the United States in 1900, and eventually there were three lines of them working on Broadway. In 1922, choreographer Russell Markert saw one of these troupes, known as the Tiller Rockets, perform in the Ziegfeld Follies and was inspired to create his own version with American dancers.

As Markert would later recall, "If I ever got a chance to get a group of American girls who would be taller and have longer legs and could do really complicated tap routines and eye-high kicks, they'd really knock your socks off." They were originally called the Missouri Rockets, and they began performing in 1925 at the Missouri Theatre in St. Louis. After the impresario Roxy brought them to New York for his Roxy Theatre, they were called the Roxyettes. They were billed as such when Roxy brought them to Radio City Music Hall for its opening in December 1932. It was only later that the name of the company changed to the Radio City Rockettes.

For decades, the schedule of a Radio City Rockette was much different than in the modern day. Until 1979, Radio City Music Hall had a movie/show format, in which a movie was shown at the theater four times a day, usually for a week. Rockettes would often have days that started at 7:00 a.m. and lasted until after 10:00 p.m. After each showing of the movie running at the theater, there would be a performance involving variety acts, the former ballet company that existed at Radio City until 1974, and finally the Rockettes. Each Rockette would work for three weeks straight and then have a week off. Russell Markert choreographed kicklines that always featured sixteen eye-high kicks, determining that the crowd usually started applauding between the eighth and the twelfth kick.

In 1957, the Radio City Rockettes performed in the Macy's Thanksgiving Day Parade for the very first time, and they have performed there every year since. For decades, they performed exclusively in the parade and at Radio City Music Hall, with the exception of the Paris Exposition in 1937, at which their sixteen-minute piece won the Grand Prix.

The Rockettes have long been represented by the American Guild of Variety Artists (AGVA). In 1967, they won a month-long strike for better working conditions, which was led by AGVA salaried officer Penny Singleton. In August 2002, contract negotiations for the troupe's veteran members resulted in a buyout by the owners of Radio City Music Hall. Roughly a fourth of the veteran Rockettes were offered retirement options, while the remaining dancers were offered the opportunity to re-audition.

One of the Rockettes' trademarks is their height requirement. In the earlier years the required height range was between 5 ft 2 in (1.6 m) and 5 ft 6.5 in (1.7 m). In the mid-1960s it was five feet, five inches to five feet, eight inches. At some point thereafter and until 2022 the range became 5 ft 6 in (1.7 m) to 5 ft 10.5 in (1.8 m) in stocking feet, this relatively modest range being to help convey the impression of all Rockettes being roughly of the same height. In 2022, the Rockettes lowered the minimum height to 5 ft 5 in (1.7 m). Rockettes must be proficient in tap, modern, jazz and ballet. The size of the original Roxyettes troupe was 16 women, but its numbers have grown since 1925. By the time they moved to Radio City Music Hall, Markert had a line of 47 dancers, 36 of whom danced at a time. There are currently 84 Rockettes: two casts with 36 dancers and 12 "swings".

On August 1, 2007, the Rockettes were inducted into the St. Louis Walk of Fame.

=== Diversity ===
The first non-white Rockette, a Japanese-born woman named Setsuko Maruhashi, was not hired until 1985. The Rockettes did not allow dark-skinned dancers into the dance line until 1987. The justification for this policy was that such women would supposedly distract from the consistent look of the dance group. In 1982, Violet Holmes, the director at the time, insisted that precision was all about uniformity, and having dancers of color would be distracting. The first African American Rockette was Jennifer Jones; selected in 1987, she made her debut in 1988 at the Super Bowl XXII halftime show. The first person with a visible disability hired by the Rockettes (Sydney Mesher, missing a left hand due to symbrachydactyly) was hired in 2019.

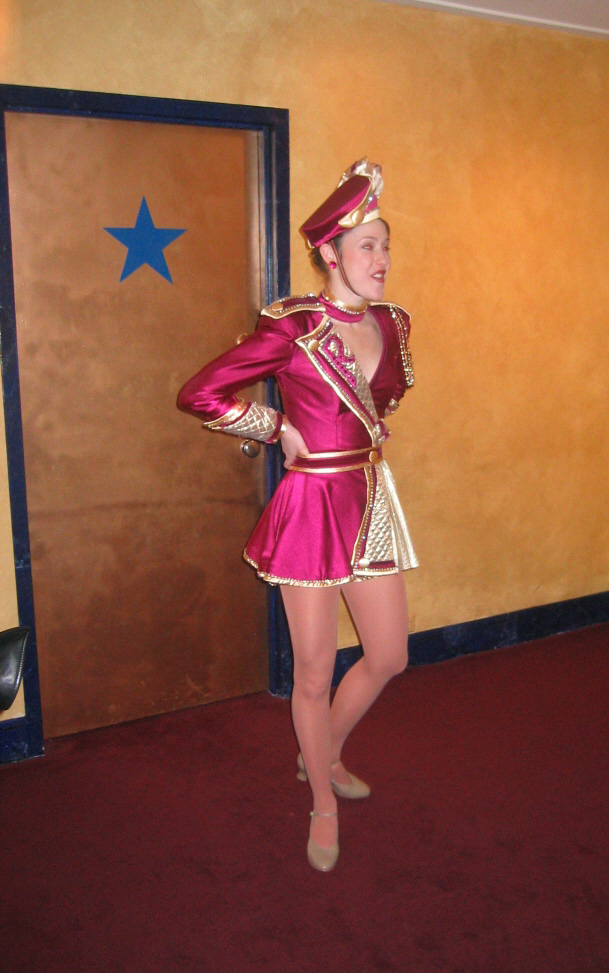
A Rockette in Radio City Music Hall

==== Rockettes Dancer Development Program ====
From 2002 to 2019, the Rockettes presented a dance training program called the Rockettes Summer Intensive. This weeklong dance education program offered aspiring dancers the opportunity to train with current Radio City Rockettes and choreographers and learn choreography from the Rockettes repertoire.

Now, the Rockettes run their own Dancer Development Program, a name for their combined efforts to bring more diversity onto the line by reaching out and working with organizations like the Ailey School, teaching classes at Boston Conservatory, and, most notably, their new Conservatory program. Dancers who make it all the way to the end of the audition at Radio City each April are invited to come and study at Radio City for a week at no cost. Housing and shoes are provided, and several dancers are often hired to join the company from the group of Conservatory hopefuls.

=== Trump inauguration controversy ===
In late 2016, the Madison Square Garden Company, which manages the troupe, agreed to have the Rockettes perform at the inauguration of Donald Trump. According to a report in the New York Daily News, there was an initial "edict" to perform at the inaugural. Immediately several Rockettes dissented, including Rockette Phoebe Pearl who complained that she was being forced to perform at the inaugural against her wishes. One Rockette felt reluctant to "perform for this monster", referring to president-elect Donald Trump, and another said she "wouldn't feel comfortable standing near a man like that in our costumes."

Madison Square Garden issued a statement saying that "For a Rockette to be considered for an event, they must voluntarily sign up and are never told they have to perform at a particular event, including the inaugural. It is always their choice. In fact, for the coming inauguration, we had more Rockettes request to participate than we have slots available." Another report suggested that dancers were allowed to "opt-out" if they thought that they would feel uncomfortable performing.

Many on social media believed attendance was mandatory, including Julissa Sabino, a performer who is part of the union, who tweeted that the issue "breaks my heart" and urged supporters to "help these ladies." Autumn Withers, a former Rockette, supported a boycott, saying "take a knee, ladies!" In December 2016, according to The Atlantic, three of the thirteen full-time dancers had chosen to sit out the event. The company danced to a medley of Irving Berlin songs at the Inaugural Ball on the evening of January 20.

=== The Rockettes in other Radio City productions ===
Although the Radio City Christmas Spectacular has been a constant every holiday season since 1979, there have been several attempts to mount a warm-weather show with the Rockettes. In the spring of 2015, Radio City launched the New York Spring Spectacular, and in the summer of 2016, produced the New York Spectacular, in an attempt to draw in audiences outside the holiday season. Neither show was ever reproduced, citing difficulties with filling up Radio City Music Hall's nearly 6,000 seats without the nostalgia and tradition that bring audiences in during the holidays.

=== COVID-19 and the Rockettes ===
In 2020, due to the COVID-19 pandemic, the Radio City Christmas Spectacular was canceled for the first time in its history. The following year, the 2021 Radio City Christmas Spectacular was canceled in mid-December, only a month into its planned runtime. Too many members of the cast and crew, who were recommended but not required to wear masks or test, caught the virus, leading to the cancellation of the show.

=== Rockettes 100 ===
In 2025 the Radio city Rockettes celebrated their 100th season. They celebrated all of the women who were once on the line by hosting a reunion. They also created a 4 part series about the history and the now of the line. The radio city Rockettes Christmas spectacular will be turning 93 (as of 2026) and adding a new performance piece. The radio city Rockettes will continue to perform their iconic wooden soldier number that has been performed by every single Rockette.

== Notable former Rockettes ==
- Lucille Bremer
- Pat Colgate
- Maria Fletcher
- Adele Jergens
- Jennifer Jones
- Suzanne Kaaren
- Amanda Kloots
- Keltie Knight
- Alicia Luciano
- Margaret E. Lynn
- Joan McCracken
- Kandice Pelletier
- Suzanne Rogers
- Jane Sherman
- Vera-Ellen
- Caitlin Sullivin
- Courtney Sullivan
- Regan Hutsell
