= White Rose (1919 film) =

1919 film

- Directed by: Alexander Korda
- Written by: Mór Jókai (novel); László Vajda
- Starring: María Corda; Gyula Bartos; Emil Fenyvessy; Helene von Bolváry
- Cinematography: Gusztáv Mihály Kovács
- Production company: Councils' Republic
- Release date: 1919
- Country: Hungary
- Languages: Silent; Hungarian intertitles

White Rose (Hungarian: Fehér rózsa) is a 1919 Hungarian silent drama film directed by Alexander Korda and starring María Corda, Gyula Bartos, and Emil Fenyvessy. It was based on an 1853 novel by Mór Jókai. It was released by the state-owned Hungarian film industry during the Hungarian Soviet Republic, although production had begun before the regime came to power. Korda went on to make two further films for the Soviet government Yamata and Ave Caesar! which led to his eventual arrest once the regime had been overthrown and his ultimate decision to leave Hungary for Austria.

== Cast ==
- María Corda
- Gyula Bartos
- Emil Fenyvessy
- Helene von Bolváry
- Gyula Szőreghy
- Nusi Somogyi
- Márton Rátkai
- Victor Varconi
- Mari K. Demjén

== Bibliography ==
- Cunningham, John (2004). Hungarian Cinema: From Coffee House to Multiplex. London: Wallflower Press. ISBN 978-1-903364-79-6.
- Kulik, Karol (1990) [1975]. Alexander Korda: The Man Who Could Work Miracles. London: Virgin Books. ISBN 978-0-86369-446-2.
