= Cyclamen (disambiguation) =

Cyclamen is a genus of 23 species of perennial flowering plants in the family Primulaceae.

Cyclamen may also refer to:

- Cyclamen (color), a shade of purple
- Cyclamen (film), a 1916 Hungarian silent film

== See also ==
- Ciklamen, an 1883 novel by Slovenian author Janko Kersnik
- Cyclamen aldehyde, a fragrance molecule
- Cyclomen (disambiguation)
