= Everybody's Woman (1924 film) =

1924 film

- Directed by: Alexander Korda
- Written by: Ernest Vajda; Alexander Korda
- Produced by: Alexander Korda
- Starring: María Corda; Jeffrey Bernard; Artúr Somlay
- Production companies: Sascha-Film; UFA
- Distributed by: UFA
- Release date: 9 January 1924
- Running time: 90 minutes
- Country: Austria
- Languages: Silent; German intertitles

Everybody's Woman (German: Jedermanns Frau) is a 1924 Austrian silent drama film directed by Alexander Korda and starring María Corda, May Hanbury, and Jeffrey Bernard. A Montmartre flower-seller is transformed into a society lady for a bet. It is also known as The Folly of Doubt.

== Production ==
After making a film The Unknown Tomorrow (1923) in Germany, Korda returned to Vienna with financial backing from Germany's largest studio UFA for a co-production with Sascha-Film. The film was shot during the winter 1923–1924. The outline screenplay was probably written by Korda, based on a Pygmalion theme. The sets were designed by the art director Julius von Borsody and Karl Hartl worked as assistant director. While in Vienna, Maria Corda also appeared in the hit film Moon of Israel (1924) by Michael Curtiz.

== Cast ==
- María Corda as Marie Celeste
- May Hanbury as Herzogin Bella
- Harry Nestor as Robert Wulfen
- Artúr Somlay as Herzog Patry Thun
- Otto Schmöle as Philipp Thun
- Adolf Weisse as Diener
- Jeffrey Bernard

== Bibliography ==
- Kulik, Karol. Alexander Korda: The Man Who Could Work Miracles. Virgin Books, 1990.
