= The Duped Journalist =

- Hungarian: A becsapott újságíró
- Directed by: Alexander Korda; Gyula Zilahi
- Release date: 1914
- Country: Hungary
- Languages: Silent; Hungarian intertitles

The Duped Journalist (Hungarian: A becsapott újságíró) is a 1914 Hungarian silent film directed by Alexander Korda and Gyula Zilahi.

== Cast ==
- Gyula Fehér as Lieutenant Colonel Ipay
- Gyula Gózon as Kalotay, reporter
- Margit Lánczy as Alice, Wesekövy's daughter
- Alajos Mészáros as Baron Félix Káró
- Ibolya Nagy as Governess
- Gyula Zilahi as Napoleon Wesekövy
- László Ö. Fehér as János
