= Yamatai (disambiguation) =

Yamatai is an ancient Japanese kingdom.

Yamatai may also refer to:

- Himiko Yamatai, a character in the Keio Flying Squadron series

== See also ==
- Yamata
- Yamatji
- Yamato (disambiguation)
