= List of stage names: Z =

This list of stage names lists names used by those in the entertainment industry, alphabetically by their stage name's surname (or the best approximation) followed by the given name (or the best approximation) where the surname begins with "Z". One-word stage names are presented in List of one-word stage names.

Stage name	Birth name	Life	Notability	Notes
Rachel Z	Rachel Nicolazzo	1962–	American musician	
Robert Z'Dar	Robert James Zdarsky	1950–2015	American actor	
Zeny Zabala	Emerenciana Ortiz Santos	1934–2017	Filipina actress	
Pia Zadora	Pia Alfreda Schipani	1954–	American singer and actress	
Moluk Zarabi	Moluk Farshforosh Kashani	1907–2000	Iranian singer	
Nik Zaran	Tracy Connell	1933–2014	Vincentian actor	
Hy Zaret	Hyman Harry Zaritsky	1907–2007	American songwriter and lyricist	
La Zarra	Fatima-Zahra Hafdi	1988–	Canadian singer	
Virginia Zeani	Virginia Zehan	1925–2023	Romanian opera singer	
Freekey Zekey	Ezekiel Giles	1975–	American rapper and record executive	
Monica Zetterlund	Eva Monica Nilsson	1937–2005	Swedish singer and actress	
Gyula Zilahy	Gyula Balogh	1859–1938	Hungarian actor	
Gorilla Zoe	Alonzo Keith Mathis Jr.	1981/1982–	American rapper (Boyz n da Hood)	
Mike Zombie	William Michael Coleman	1992–	American rapper and producer	
Rob Zombie	Robert Bartleh Cummings	1965–	American musician and film director	
Tay Zonday	Adam Nyerere Bahner	1982–	American musician and YouTuber	
Billy Zoom	Stuart Tyson Kindell	1948–	American musician (X)	
Vera Zorina	Eva Brigitta Hartwig	1917–2003	Norwegian-American actress and ballerina	
Diana Zubiri	Rosemarie Joy Garcia	1985–	Filipina actress	
Zim Zum	Timothy Michael Linton	Unknown	American musician (Marilyn Manson)	
Bob Zurke	Boguslaw Albert Zukowski	1912–1944	American musician and bandleader	
Buckwheat Zydeco	Stanley Dural Jr.	1947–2016	American musician	
