= Margit Abelovszky =

Margi Abelovszky was an early 20th century Hungarian stage actress. She appeared at the Folk Theatre from 1904 to 1906 and at the Buda Színkör. In 1909 she joined the Hungarian Theatre. From 1912 on, she featured at the National Theater-Vígopera. Notable roles include Ferkó in Mór Jókai's The White Woman from Lőcse and Mercedes in Martos's Granada Groom.
