= Bella Nagy =

Hungarian actress

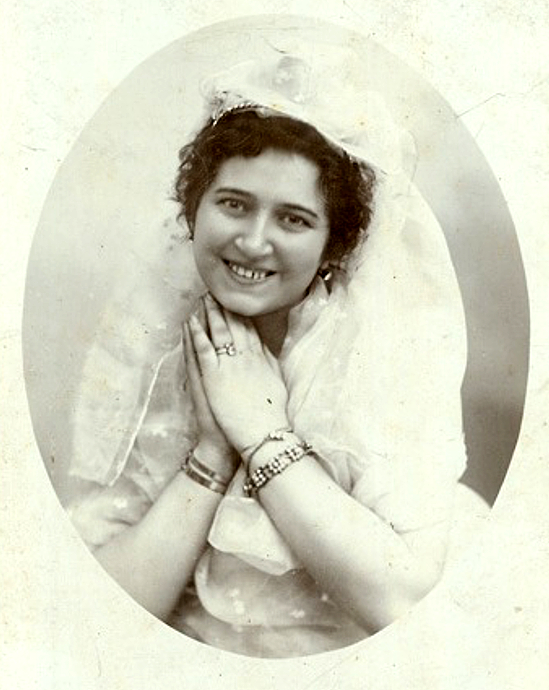
- Bella Nagy, photographed in 1899
- Born: Bella Grósz; 4 July 1879; Jákó, Hungary
- Died: 30 January 1947 (aged 67); Amersham, Buckinghamshire, UK
- Other name: Jókainé Nagy Bella
- Occupation: Actress
- Spouse: Mór Jókai (m. 1899-1904)

Bella Nagy (née Grósz; 4 July 1879 – 30 January 1947) was a Hungarian actress, and the second wife of writer Mór Jókai.

== Early life ==
Bella Grósz was born in Jákó, Hungary, the daughter of Jewish parents, Móric Grósz and Éva Flamm. Her father was a mechanic. She graduated from a commercial school in Óbuda before pursuing an interest in the theatre, attending the Rákosi Szidi acting school.

== Career ==
Nagy had her stage debut in 1898, and performed in several works by Mór Jókai before she married the writer in 1899 in Budapest. Their age difference (he was 74 and she was 20), plus their religious differences, caused a scandal, and his family tried to have him declared incompetent. She left the stage reluctantly, and attempted a comeback in 1901, but continued in the public eye as Jókai's wife.

After his death, she was his sole heir, outraging other claimants and causing further scandal and prolonged legal battles; she lost those battles, and was left without support from Jókai's estate.

In 1912, Nagy donated Jókai's books and papers to the Hungarian National Museum in exchange for a life pension.

== Personal life ==
Nagy married writer Mór Jókai in 1899, as his second wife; they honeymooned in Sicily. His first wife, Róza Laborfalvi, was also an actress. Nagy was widowed when Jókai died in 1904; she never remarried.

She moved to England in the 1939, to flee the Nazis and to arrange for an English-language edition of her husband's works. She lost her life pension in 1942, when Germany pressured Hungary to cease payments. She died in 1947, in Amersham, Buckinghamshire, aged 67.
