= The Village Rogue =

The Village Rogue may refer to:

- The Village Rogue (1916 film), a Hungarian silent drama film
- The Village Rogue (1938 film), a Hungarian drama film
