= Man of Gold (film) =

1919 film directed by Alexander Korda

- Az aranyember
- Directed by: Alexander Korda
- Written by: László Vajda; Mór Jókai (novel)
- Produced by: Alexander Korda
- Starring: Oszkár Beregi; Gábor Rajnay; Gábor Rajnay
- Production company: Corvin Film
- Release date: 1919
- Running time: 83 min (restored)
- Country: Hungary
- Languages: Silent; Hungarian intertitles

Man of Gold (Hungarian: Az aranyember) is a 1919 Hungarian silent drama film directed by Alexander Korda and starring Oszkár Beregi, Gábor Rajnay and Margit Makay. The movie is based on the novel The Man with the Golden Touch by Mór Jókai.

== Cast ==
- Oszkár Beregi - Tímár Mihály (as Beregi Oszkár)
- Gábor Rajnay - Todor Krisztyán
- Margit Makay - Kondja
- Ica von Lenkeffy - Noémi (as R.Lenkeffy Ica)
- Lili Berky - Athalia
- Gyula Bartos - Maxim Krisztyán, tatăl lui Todor
- Jenő Horváth - Brazovic Atanáz
- Mari K. Demjén - Brazovic felesége
- Szeréna Fáy - Teréza mama
- Gyula Szőreghy - Pasha Ali Csorbadzsi
- Gusztáv Vándory - Kadisa kapitány (as Gyula Vándory)

== Bibliography ==
- Charles Drazin: Korda: Britain’s Movie Mogul. Verlag I.B. Tauris, 2011, ISBN 978-0-85771-993-5.
- Alan Goble: The Complete Index to Literary Sources in Film. Verlag Walter de Gruyter, 1999, ISBN 3-11-095194-0, S. 247, 525, 856.
- Maurus Jokai: Ein Goldmensch! Roman, aus dem Ungarischen. Druck u. Verlag v. Otto Janke, Berlin 1873.
- Karol Kulik: Alexander Korda: the man who could work miracles. Verlag W. H. Allen, 1975.
- Claudio Magris: Donau. (Teil 2, Österreich/Slowakei/Ungarn)., 28. August 2009. (online bei wordpress.com)
- Stephen Sisa: The Spirit of Hungary: A Panorama of Hungarian History and Culture. Verlag Rákóczi Foundation, 1983, ISBN 0-919545-02-5.
- Thomas Schmidinger: Ada Kaleh. Die vergessene „Insel des Islam“. In: Wiener Zeitung. 11./12. Mai 2013. (online at austria-forum.org)
- Paul Tabori: Alexander Korda. Verlag Living Books, 1966, S. 312.
