= The Man with the Golden Touch =

1872 novel by Mór Jókai

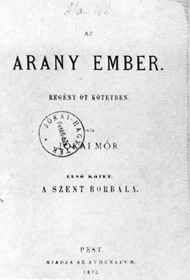
- First edition title page
- Author: Mór Jókai
- Original title: Az arany ember
- Language: Hungarian
- Publication date: 1872
- Publication place: Hungary

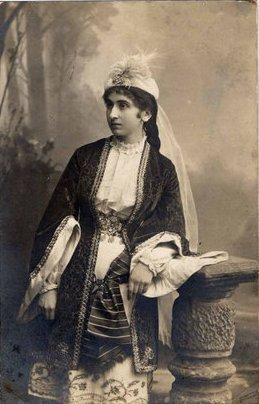
Fáy Szeréna as Timéa in Az arany ember

The Man with the Golden Touch (Hungarian: Az arany ember, lit. 'The Golden Man') is an 1872 novel by Hungarian novelist Mór Jókai. As Jókai states in the afterword of the novel, it was based on a true story he had heard from his grand-aunt as a child.

== Plot ==
Mihály Timár works on a ship on the Danube owned by Athanáz Brazovics, (Note: Athanas Brazovics in some translations) a wheat merchant. The wheat's owner, Euthym Trikalisz, (Note: Euthemio Trikaliss in some translations) and his thirteen-year-old daughter Timéa are also aboard. They stop at an undiscovered island inhabited by the widow Teréza (Note: Theresa in some translations) and her young daughter, Noémi. Krisztyán (Note: Theodor Krisstyan in some translations) arrives; he knows Teréza and Noémi, who dislike him.

Timár overhears Krisztyán trying to blackmail Teréza. Krisztyán takes a gold bracelet Timéa gave to Noémi, and leaves. Teréza tells Timár that her husband was ruined by Krisztyán's father and Athanáz, and she fled to the island with her daughter; Krisztyán wants to marry Noémi, who despises him.

Trikalisz tells Timár that he is Ali Csorbadzsi, (Note: Tschorbadschi in some translations) a pasha. He wants to go to Brazovics, but knows Krisztyán is an Ottoman spy. Ali poisons himself, and makes Timár ensure Timéa's safety. He gives him a box with 1,000 gold coins, makes him promise to keep it for Timéa, and says that the rest of his wealth (worth 10,000 gold coins) is the wheat. He asks Timár to awaken Timéa after he dies.

Ali dies; Timár awakens Timéa and tells her about her father's death. When they reach port, he tells the police that he knows nothing about Ali. The ship runs aground and sinks; Timéa and Timár barely escape.

Timár brings Timéa to the Brazovics mansion. They are greeted by his wife Zsófia, (Note: Sophie in some translations) their daughter Athalie, and Imre Kacsuka. (Note: Emerich Katschuka in some translations) Brazovics returns, welcomes Timéa, and accuses Timár of theft when he receives the box and learns that the ship sank. Timár leaves.

He meets Kacsuka, who supplies the army with bread. Kacsuka tells him to buy the worthless wheat and sell it to the army. Timár hesitates, but buys the wheat and inspects it. He sees a red crescent on a sack, and recalls Ali talking about a red crescent. Timár finds the sack full of treasure, and invests the money.

He becomes wealthy, and tells Brazovics about making bread from the drenched wheat and selling it to the army. Brazovics reports him to the Ministry of Finance, which clears him. Timár goes to Vienna and asks the minister to lease him land in Levetinc. The minister makes him a nobleman, with the title "of Levetinc". (Note: Von Levetinczy in some translations)

Athalie is preparing to marry Kacsuka, and her father envies Timár. She knows that Timéa is in love with Kacsuka. Timéa sews her bridal gown, thinking that it is her own.

Brazovics asks Timár if he plans to marry Athalie. Timár says no, says goodbye to Timéa, promises that he will return, and leaves. He fools Brazovics in a business deal.

Timéa sees Athalie in the bridal gown and realizes what has happened. Brazovics, ruined financially, dies. Kacsuka breaks his engagement with Athalie. Timár buys Brazovics's property, gives it to Timéa, and asks her to marry him. Timéa loves Kacsuka, but agrees to marry Timár. Athalie and her mother stay with them, and Athalie becomes Timéa's servant. Timár realizes that Timéa is not in love with him; he gives her gifts and trips in the vain hope of winning her love.

Timár begins to suspect that Timéa loves someone else and tests her, telling her that he will visit Levetinc for a month. He leaves, returning the same night to find Timéa sleeping alone. Athalie tells Timár that Timéa loves someone else, but will remain faithful to him. He flees to the island. Timár feels comfortable with Teréza and Noémi, who is sixteen. Noémi asks him if he has anyone waiting for him, and Timár says no.

Timár returns to the island to see Noémi in the spring. A flood has killed the walnut trees, and he finds a child with the women. Timár cuts down the trees to build a house, leaves the island and returns in the spring. He becomes ill, and is nursed by Noémi. The child dies.

Timár returns home, realizes that he cannot continue his double life, returns to the island and finds another boy in the hut. He finishes the house, and Teréza tells him that she is dying.

When Timár returns home, Athalie tells him that Timéa is unfaithful; he learns that Krisztyán is around. Timár reaches his castle on Lake Balaton. Krisztyán confronts him, tells him that his father knew Ali, and tries to blackmail him. Timár goes to the lake, and Krisztyán's body bobs to the surface. He goes to the island to see Noémi, and promises to stay with her. Timéa is still in love with Kacsuka.

Timár teaches Dodi how to write, and asks him to write to Timéa about the secret corridor. Timéa, thinking Timár is dead, plans to marry Kacsuka. Kacsuka reads Dodi's letter; Athalie says that only she and Timár knew about the hideout, and Timár is still alive.

Forty years later, the author visits the island; a peaceful colony lives there. Deoda greets them and leads them to a wooden house where the "old men" live. An old man greets them, and asks the author to tell his story.

== Translations ==
Agnes Hegan Kennard's English translation, with the title Timar's Two Worlds, was published in 1888. A revised edition appeared in 1975 with Corvina Press and was titled The Man with the Golden Touch. One of the first languages into which the novel was translated was Polish by Gubrynowicz and Schmidt, in the Polish city of Lviv, more than a decade before the English translation.

== Film, TV or theatrical adaptations ==
The novel was made into motion pictures in 1918, 1936, 1962 and 2005 (the latest was made for TV). The 1918 version was directed by Alexander Korda. The film versions are all titled Az aranyember, in accordance with modern spelling.
