= Emil Fenyvessy =

Hungarian actor (1859–1924)

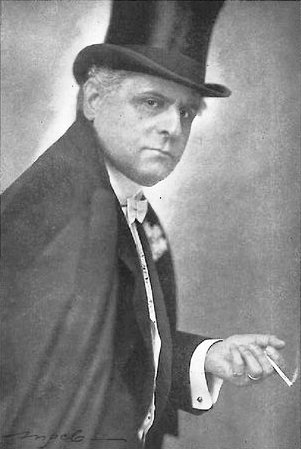
Fenyvesi Emil

Emil Fenyvessy (31 March 1859 – 20 March 1924) was a Hungarian actor.

Emil Fenyvessy was born Emil Teitelbaum into a Jewish family in Ternye, Hungary (now, Terňa, Slovakia). He died in Budapest in 1924.

== Selected filmography ==
- The Black Diamond (1917)
- Anna Karenina (1918)
- Yamata (1919)
- Oliver Twist (1919)
- White Rose (1919)
- Tragödie im Hause Habsburg (1924)

== Bibliography ==
- Kulik, Karol. Alexander Korda: The Man Who Could Work Miracles. Virgin Books, 1990.
