= Neither at Home or Abroad =

- Directed by: Alexander Korda
- Written by: Dezső Gyárfás; László Vajda
- Produced by: Alexander Korda
- Starring: Lajos Ujváry; Hermin Haraszti; María Corda; László Z. Molnár
- Production company: Corvin Film
- Release date: 1919
- Country: Hungary
- Languages: Silent; Hungarian intertitles

Neither at Home or Abroad (Hungarian: Se ki, se be) is a 1919 Hungarian silent drama film directed by Alexander Korda and starring Lajos Ujváry, Hermin Haraszti and María Corda. Its title is also often translated as Neither In Nor Out.

== Cast ==
- Lajos Ujváry
- Hermin Haraszti
- María Corda
- László Z. Molnár
- Nusi Somogyi
- Gusztáv Vándory
- Tivadar Uray
- Janka Csatay

== Bibliography ==
- Kulik, Karol. Alexander Korda: The Man Who Could Work Miracles. Virgin Books, 1990.
