= Masters of the Sea (film) =

1922 film

- Directed by: Alexander Korda
- Written by: Ernest Vajda (novel)
- Produced by: Arnold Pressburger
- Starring: Victor Varconi; María Corda; Tibor Lubinszky; Gyula Szőreghy
- Cinematography: Hans Theyer
- Edited by: Karl Hartl
- Production company: Sascha-Film
- Release date: 3 February 1922
- Country: Austria
- Languages: Silent; German intertitles

Masters of the Sea (German: Herren der Meere) is a 1922 Austrian silent adventure film directed by Alexander Korda and starring Victor Varconi, María Corda and Tibor Lubinszky.

== Production ==
It was the second film made by Korda for Austria's Sascha-Film company. It is based on the novel The Pirates by Ernest Vajda who also wrote the screenplay. Several other Hungarian exiles also worked on the film, including the producer Arnold Pressburger. The film's storyline offered a romantic view of modern-day pirates and their pursuit of treasure. Korda's actress wife Maria Corda appeared in a leading role, credited as Maria Palma.

== Cast ==
- Victor Varconi
- María Corda - Anny Lind (as Maria Palma)
- Tibor Lubinszky
- Gyula Szőreghy
- Harry De Loon
- Max Devrient
- Reinhold Häussermann
- Gert Lubbers
- Paul Pranger
- Albert Schreiber

== Bibliography ==
- Kulik, Karol. Alexander Korda: The Man Who Could Work Miracles. Virgin Books, 1990.
