= Watchhouse in the Carpathians =

- Hungarian: Őrház a Kárpátokban
- Directed by: Alexander Korda; Gyula Zilahy
- Starring: Anna Hadrik; Gusztáv Vándory
- Production company: Tricolour Film
- Release date: 1914
- Country: Hungary
- Languages: Silent; Hungarian intertitles

Watchhouse in the Carpathians (Hungarian: Őrház a Kárpátokban) is a 1914 Hungarian silent drama film directed by Alexander Korda and Gyula Zilahy and starring Anna Hadrik and Gusztáv Vándory.

== Cast ==
- Anna Hadrik
- Gusztáv Vándory
