= The Laughing Saskia =

- Directed by: Alexander Korda
- Starring: Sari Körmendy; Dezső Kertész; László Békeffi
- Cinematography: Béla Zsitkovszky
- Production company: Unió Film
- Release date: 1916
- Country: Hungary
- Languages: Silent; Hungarian intertitles

The Laughing Saskia (Hungarian: A Nevetö Szaszkia) is a 1916 Hungarian silent drama film directed by Alexander Korda and starring Sari Körmendy, Dezső Kertész and László Békeffi.

== Cast ==
- Sari Körmendy
- Dezső Kertész
- László Békeffi
- Gyula Fehér

== Bibliography ==
- Kulik, Karol. Alexander Korda: The Man Who Could Work Miracles. Virgin Books, 1990.
