= Béla Zsitkovszky =

Hungarian cinematographer and film director

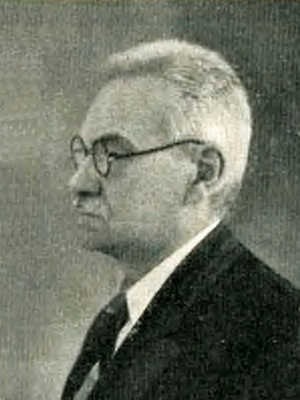
- Born: 3 April 1868; Eperjes, Austria-Hungary (now Prešov, Slovakia)
- Died: 16 September 1930 (aged 62); Budapest, Hungary
- Other name: Gyula Antal Zágon
- Occupations: Film director Cinematographer
- Years active: 1901 – 1918

Béla Zsitkovszky (3 April 1868 – 16 September 1930) was a Hungarian cinematographer and film director. Zsitkovszky was a film pioneer notable for producing the country's first ever film A táncz (The dance) in 1901. Zsitkovszky was a cinema projectionist who was commissioned to make a film. He shot it entirely on location as Budapest lacked a film studio. In 1901 he opened the first Hungarian film laboratory.

== Selected filmography ==
Cinematographer

- A Munkászubbony (1914)
- Ágyú és harang (1915)
- Lyon Lea (1915)
- The Officer's Swordknot (1915)
- The Village Rogue (1916)
- The Karthauzer (1916)
- The Laughing Saskia (1916)
- Az obsitos (1917)
- Tájfun (1917)
- Tüzpróba (1918)
- Az impresszárió (1918)

== Bibliography ==
- Cunningham, John. Hungarian Cinema: From Coffee House to Multiplex. Wallflower Press, 2004.
- Kulik, Karol. Alexander Korda: The Man Who Could Work Miracles. Virgin Books, 1990.
