= Erzsi Paál =

Hungarian actress (1912–1973)

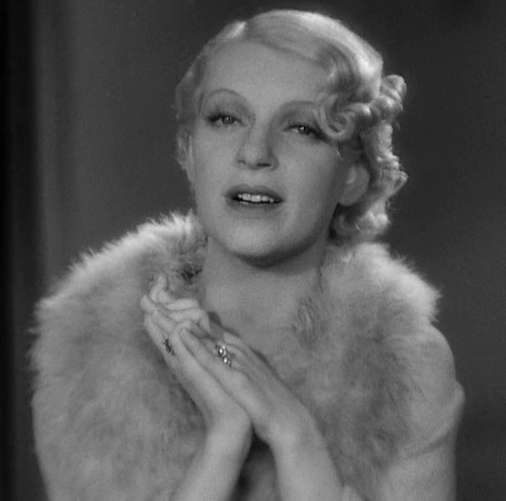
- Paál in 1937
- Born: Erzsébet Polacsek; 19 November 1912; Lugoj, Austro-Hungarian Empire
- Died: 24 June 1973 (aged 60); Rome, Lazio, Italy
- Other name: Ersi Pond
- Occupation: Actress
- Years active: 1933–1971 (film)

Erzsi Paál (19 November 1912 – 24 June 1973) was a Hungarian stage actress, who also appeared in several films. She was born Erzsébet Polacsek in Lugoj, then in the Austro-Hungarian Empire but subsequently ceded to Romania, to Hungarian parents. After establishing herself in as a soubrette in Budapest, she moved to Italy and appeared at the Teatro Eliseo in Rome and the Teatro Odeon in Milan. She also starred alongside comedian Totò in his debut film Fermo con le mani in 1937. She married the actor John Bartha, a fellow Hungarian who was also based in Italy. Her final screen appearance was in the 1971 giallo film A Lizard in a Woman's Skin

== Selected filmography ==
- Vica the Canoeist (1933)
- Romance of Ida (1934)
- A Lizard in a Woman's Skin (1971)

== Bibliography ==
- Enyedi, Sándor. Rivalda nélkül: a határon túli magyar színjátszás kislexikona. Teleki László Alapítvány, 1999.
- Pistolese, Paolo . Totò, Stars & Stripes. Cinecittà, 2000.
