= Vilmos Komlós =

Hungarian actor

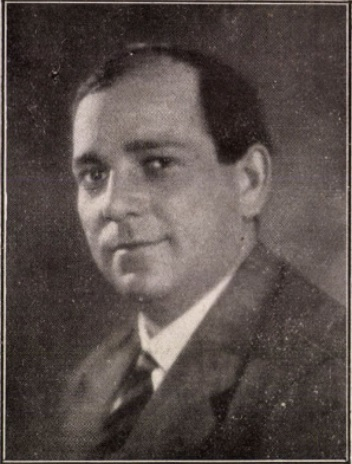
- Komlós in 1929.
- Born: 3 May 1891; Süllye, Austro-Hungarian Empire
- Died: 27 February 1959 (aged 67); Budapest, Hungary
- Occupation: Actor
- Years active: 1930–1958 (film)

Vilmos Komlós (1893–1959) was a Hungarian stage and film actor. He was a top cabaret performer in Budapest, many of his colleagues and collaborators being Jewish and later forced to emigrate. He was married to the actress Irma Pintér, and their daughter Juci Komlós also became an actress.

== Selected filmography ==
- The Ghost Train (1933)
- Vica the Canoeist (1933)
- Miss Iza (1933)
- The Dream Car (1934)
- Everything for the Woman (1934)
- The Empress and the Hussar (1935)
- Barátságos arcot kérek (1936)
- Where Do We Sleep on Sunday? (1937)
- The Siege of Beszterce (1948)
- Janika (1949)
- The State Department Store (1953)
- Leila and Gábor (1956)

== Bibliography ==
- Bodó, Béla. Black Humor and the White Terror. Taylor & Francis, 2023.
- Szalai, Anna. In the Land of Hagar: The Jews of Hungary : History, Society and Culture. Beth Hatefutsoth, the Nahum Goldmann Museum of the Jewish Diaspora, 2002.
