= Anna Karenina (1918 film) =

1918 film directed by Márton Garas

- Directed by: Márton Garas
- Written by: István Lázár
- Based on: Anna Karenina; 1878 novel by Leo Tolstoy
- Produced by: Mór Klopfer; Imre Kovács; Jenõ Radó; Mór Wellner
- Starring: Irén Varsányi; Dezső Kertész; Emil Fenyvessy; Gyula Margittai
- Cinematography: Raymond Pellerin
- Production company: Hungária Filmgyár
- Release date: 23 October 1918
- Running time: 53 minutes
- Country: Hungary
- Languages: Silent; Hungarian intertitles

Anna Karenina (Hungarian: Karenin Anna) is a 1918 Hungarian silent drama film directed by Márton Garas and starring Irén Varsányi, Dezső Kertész and Emil Fenyvessy. It is an adaptation of the 1878 novel Anna Karenina by Leo Tolstoy.

== Plot summary ==
Anna Karenina is married to the older statesman Karenin, but becomes romantically involved with Count Vronsky. Their affair places Anna in conflict with the expectations of Russian high society and strains her marriage, reputation, and family life. As the relationship with Vronsky continues, Anna becomes increasingly isolated and distressed. Unable to reconcile her love, social disgrace, and growing despair, she ultimately takes her own life by throwing herself under a train.

== Cast ==
- Irén Varsányi as Anna Karenina
- Dezső Kertész as Vronsky
- Emil Fenyvessy as Karenin
- Gyula Margittai as Oblovszkij
- Jenö Balassa
- Sándor Virányi as Levin doktor
- Vilma Lakos
- Karola Gárdi
- Sandy Igolits
- Sári Almási]
- Adolf Sieder
- Mária Gajáry
