= Alfréd Márkus =

Hungarian composer

- Born: 20 February 1883; Budapest, Austro-Hungarian Empire
- Died: 30 October 1946 (aged 63); New York City, United States
- Occupation: Composer
- Years active: 1933-1938 (film)

Alfréd Márkus (1883–1946) was a Hungarian composer noted for his operettas and film scores. He was from a Jewish background and was involved with the National Hungarian Jewish Cultural Association. Towards the end of his life, he left Hungary for the United States where he died in 1946. He used the alias "Fred Markush" when publishing some of his songs.

== Selected filmography ==
- Vica the Canoeist (1933)
- The Dream Car (1934)
- The Homely Girl (1935)
- Miss President (1935)
- An Affair of Honour (1937)
- All Men Are Crazy (1937)

== Bibliography ==
- Shepherd, John. Continuum encyclopedia of popular music of the world, Volumes 3-7. Continuum, 2005.
