= Márton Garas =

Hungarian film director

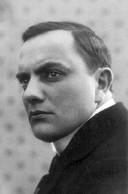
- Born: 18 May 1881; Újvidék, Austria-Hungary
- Died: 26 June 1930 (aged 49); Budapest, Hungary
- Occupation: Film director
- Years active: 1915 - 1923

Márton Garas (1881–1930) was a Hungarian film director.

József Bécsi was the cinematographer for several of his films in 1915.

== Selected filmography ==
Director

- Három het (1917)
- Anna Karenina (1918)
- Oliver Twist (1919)
- Sappho (1920)
- New-York express kábel (1921)
- Christopher Columbus (1923)
- Farsangi mámor (1923)

Actor

- Struggling Hearts (1916)

Screenwriter

- Two and a Lady (1926)

== Bibliography ==
- Cunningham, John. Hungarian Cinema: From Coffee House to Multiplex. Wallflower Press, 2004.
