= László Z. Molnár =

Hungarian actor (1883–1956)

László Z. Molnár (23 June 1883 – 1 November 1956) was a Hungarian stage and film actor. He was born in Zombor, Austria-Hungary (now Sombor, Serbia) and died in Budapest.

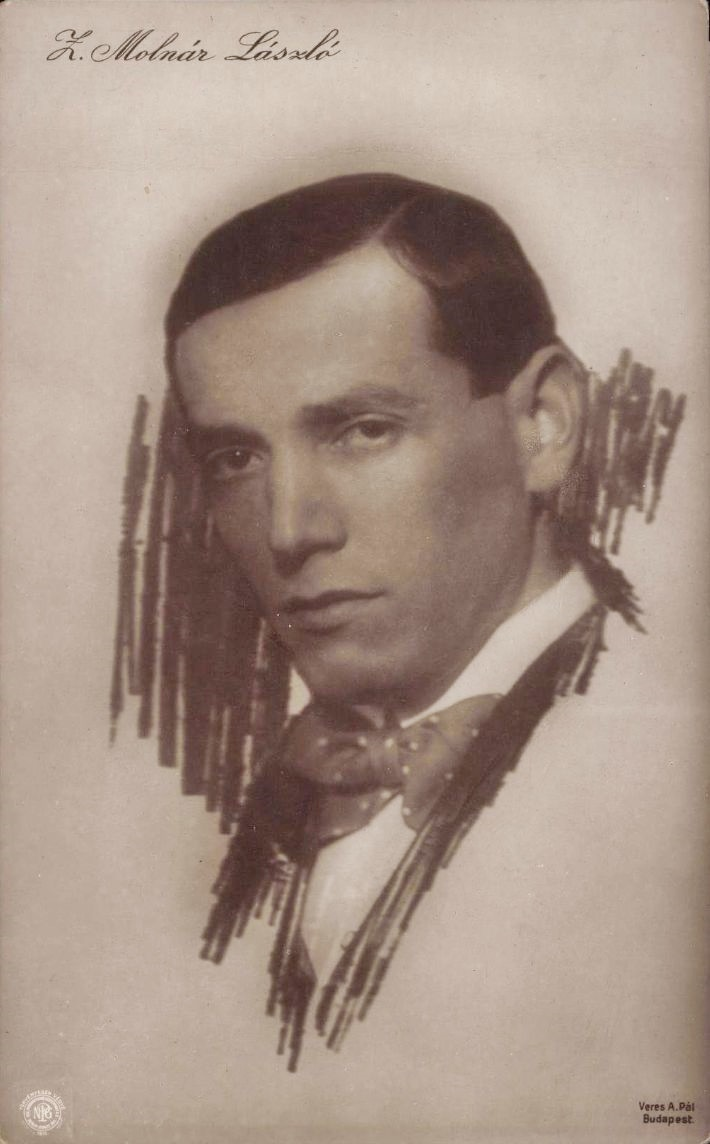
Z. Molnár László, was a film actor

== Selected filmography ==
- 99 (1919 film)
- Oliver Twist (1919)
- Neither at Home or Abroad (1919)
- Purple Lilacs (1934)
- Dream Love (1935)
- St. Peter's Umbrella (1935)
- The Students of Igloi (1935)
- The Wise Mother (1935)
- I May See Her Once a Week (1937)
- Sweet Revenge (1937)
- 120 Kilometres an Hour (1937)
- An Affair of Honour (1937)
- I Defended a Woman (1938)

== Bibliography ==
- Kulik, Karol. Alexander Korda: The Man Who Could Work Miracles. Virgin Books, 1990.
