= Tibor Lubinszky =

Hungarian actor (1909–1956)

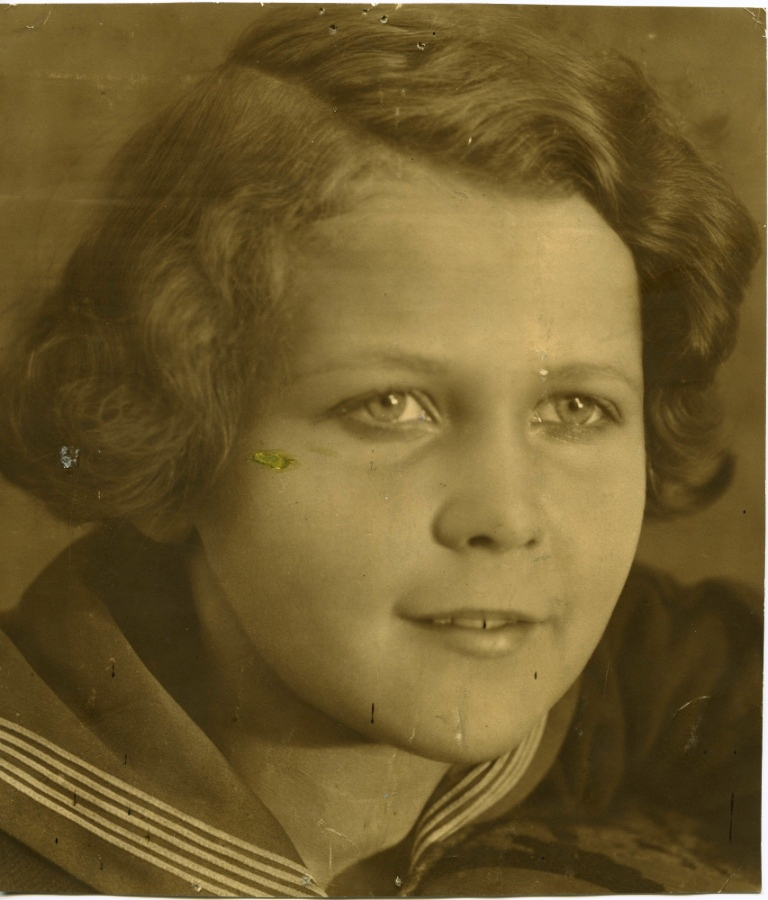
- Born: Lubinszky Tibor Ödön György; November 26, 1909; Budapest, Hungary
- Died: April 1, 1956 (aged 46); Budapest, Hungary
- Citizenship: Hungary
- Occupation: Actor
- Years active: 1913-1924
- Known for: The Prince and the Pauper
- Spouse: Tóth Rózsa (1934-1956) (his death)
- Children: György Lubinszky
- Parent(s): Lubinszky Lajos (father); Reisz Teréz (mother)

Tibor Lubinszky (26 November 1909 - 1 April 1956) was a Hungarian film actor. Lubinszky became famous as a child actor, starring in a number of silent films during the 1910s and 1920s. In the 1920 Austrian film The Prince and the Pauper he played the role of two doppelgangers. He is sometimes credited as Tibi Lubinsky.

== Selected filmography ==
- Little Lord Fauntleroy (1918)
- Oliver Twist (1919)
- The Prince and the Pauper (1920)
- Lucrezia Borgia (1922)
- Masters of the Sea (1922)
- A Vanished World (1922)

== Bibliography ==
- Kulik, Karol. Alexander Korda: The Man Who Could Work Miracles. Virgin Books, 1990.
- Holmstrom, John. The Moving Picture Boy: An International Encyclopaedia from 1895 to 1995, Norwich, Michael Russell, 1996, p. 38.
