= Lyon Lea =

1915 film by Alexander Korda and M. Miklós Pásztory

Lyon Lea is a 1915 Hungarian film. It was directed by Alexander Korda (as Korda Sándor) and M. Miklós Pásztory.

It starred Péter Andorffy and Elemér Baló.
