= Sándor Radó (actor) =

Hungarian actor

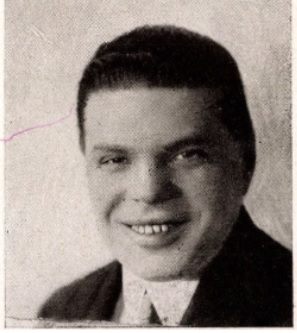
- Radó in 1931
- Born: 3 May 1891; Rahó, Austro-Hungarian Empire
- Died: December 1944 (aged 53); Budapest, Hungary
- Occupation: Actor
- Years active: 1927–1937 (film)

Sándor Radó (1891–1944) was a Hungarian stage and film actor. He established himself as an actor after making his debut in 1908, settling Budapest and appearing at many venues. He was part of the Budapest cabaret scene. Between 1927 and 1937 he appeared occasionally in films. Of Jewish heritage, the increasing Anti-Jewish laws restricted him from pursuing his career. He died during the rule of the Nazi-aligned Arrow Cross.

== Selected filmography ==
- A csodadoktor (1927)
- Filléres gyors (1932)
- Miss Iza (1933)
- Vica the Canoeist (1933)
- Rotschild leánya (1934)
- Forog az idegen (1936)
- Lady Seeks a Room (1937)

== Bibliography ==
- Bodó, Béla. Black Humor and the White Terror. Taylor & Francis, 2023.
- Horák, Magda. ''A magyar értelmiség veszteségei az 1940-es években. BékésPrint, 1994.
- Szalai, Anna. In the Land of Hagar: The Jews of Hungary : History, Society and Culture. Beth Hatefutsoth, the Nahum Goldmann Museum of the Jewish Diaspora, 2002.
