= Miklós Pásztory =

Hungarian film director

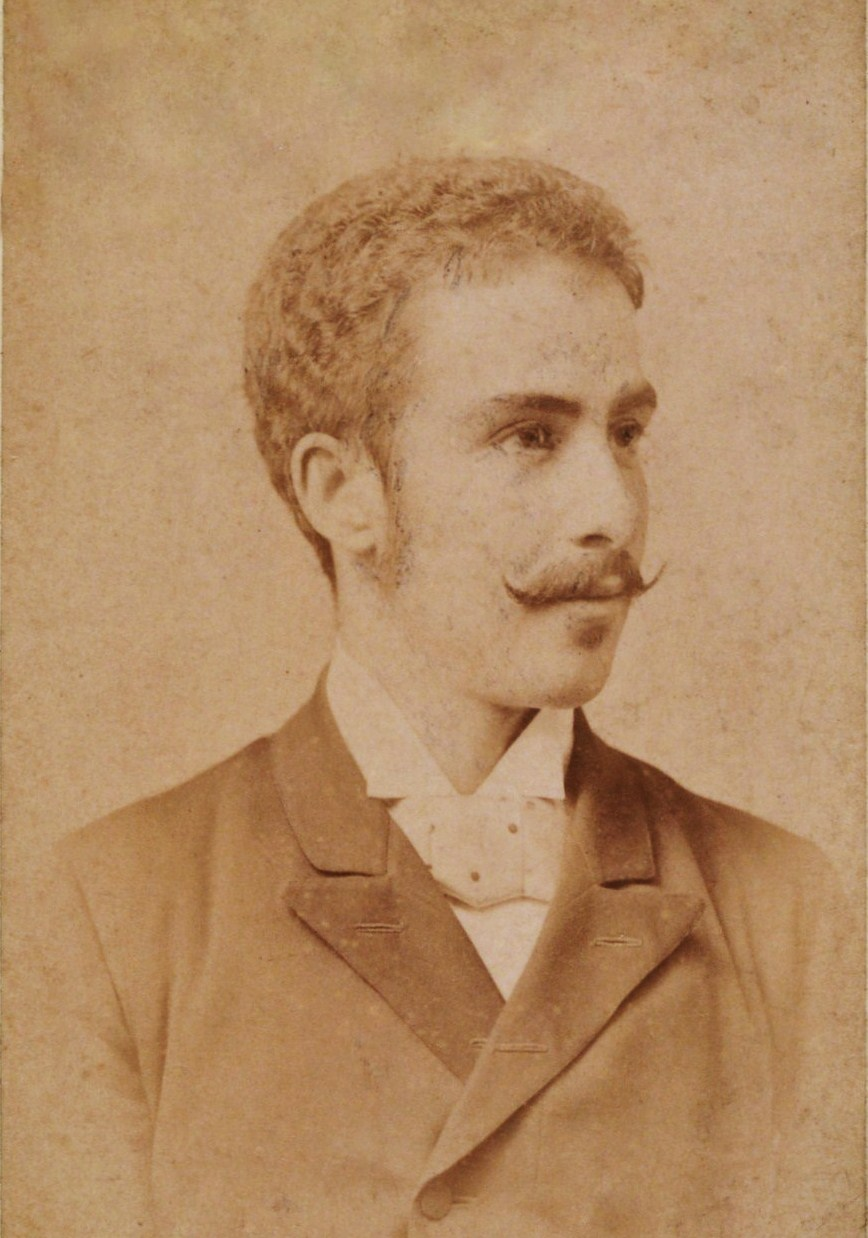
Pásztory c. 1895

Miklós Pásztory (1875–1922) was a Hungarian film director.

== Selected filmography ==
- Lyon Lea (1915)
- The Village Rogue (1916)
- The Red Purse (1917)
- Károly bakák (1918)
- Végszó (1920)

== Bibliography ==
- Cunningham, John. Hungarian Cinema: From Coffee House to Multiplex. Wallflower Press, 2004.
