= Tragedy in the House of Habsburg =

1924 film

- Directed by: Alexander Korda
- Written by: Lajos Bíró
- Produced by: Alexander Korda
- Starring: María Corda; Kálmán Zátony; Emil Fenyvessy; Werner Schott
- Cinematography: Nicolas Farkas
- Edited by: Karl Hartl
- Production company: Korda Film
- Distributed by: UFA
- Release date: 30 May 1924
- Country: Germany
- Languages: Silent; German intertitles

Tragedy in the House of Habsburg (German: Tragödie im Hause Habsburg) is a 1924 German silent historical film directed by Alexander Korda and starring María Corda, Kálmán Zátony and Emil Fenyvessy. The film recounts the events of the 1889 Mayerling Incident in which the heir to the Austro-Hungarian Empire committed suicide. Interior filming was done at the Johannisthal Studios in Berlin with location shooting in Vienna. The film cost $80,000 to make, but only earned back around half of this at the box office.

== Cast ==
- María Corda as Baroness Vetsera
- Kálmán Zátony as Crown Prince Rudolf
- Emil Fenyvessy as Emperor Franz Joseph I of Austria
- Werner Schott as Lieutenant Corradini
- Arthur Bergen
- Hans Brausewetter
- Friedrich Kayßler
- Louis Ralph
- Mathilde Sussin
- Jakob Tiedtke
- Ferdinand von Alten

== Bibliography ==
- Kulik, Karol. Alexander Korda: The Man Who Could Work Miracles. Virgin Books, 1990.
