= The Officer's Swordknot =

1915 film

- Directed by: Alexander Korda
- Starring: Gábor Rajnay; Mici Haraszti; Ödön Pajor
- Cinematography: Béla Zsitkovszky
- Production company: Korona Film
- Release date: 1915
- Country: Hungary
- Languages: Silent; Hungarian intertitles

The Officer's Swordknot (Hungarian: A Tiszti kardbojt) is a 1915 Hungarian silent romance film directed by Alexander Korda and starring Gábor Rajnay, Mici Haraszti and Ödön Pajor

== Cast ==
- Gábor Rajnay
- Mici Haraszti
- Ödön Pajor
- Irén Gombaszögi
- Jenő Horváth
- Lajos Szőke
- Ili Vörbös
- Gyula Féher

== Bibliography ==
- Kulik, Karol. Alexander Korda: The Man Who Could Work Miracles. Virgin Books, 1990.
