= Oliver Twist (1919 film) =

1919 Hungarian film directed by Márton Garas

- Directed by: Márton Garas
- Written by: Vajda László
- Based on: Oliver Twist; 1837 novel by Charles Dickens
- Starring: Tibor Lubinszky; Emil Fenyvessy; Jenő Törzs; László Z. Molnár
- Cinematography: István Eiben
- Production company: Corvin Film
- Release date: 1919
- Running time: 40 minutes
- Country: Hungary
- Languages: Silent; Hungarian intertitles

Oliver Twist (Hungarian: Twist Olivér) is a 1919 Hungarian silent drama film directed by Márton Garas and starring Tibor Lubinszky, Emil Fenyvessy and Jenő Törzs. It is an adaptation of the 1838 novel Oliver Twist by Charles Dickens.

== Plot summary ==
Raised in an orphanage after his mother died shortly after childbirth, Oliver Twist lives on the street. He meets a thief, a boy named Jack Dawkins but known as the Artful Dodger. This introduces him to Fagin, leader of a gang of children, petty thieves and pickpockets. But Oliver is not a thief and does not want to steal. In the end, he will find his family and will be able to live an honest life.

== Cast ==
- Tibor Lubinszky - Olivér
- Emil Fenyvessy - Brownlow
- Jenő Törzs - Monks
- László Z. Molnár - Fagin
- Sári Almási - Nancy
- József Hajdú - Bumble
- Marcsa Simon - Bumblené
- Gyula Szőreghy - Sikes
- Ernő Verebes - 1. tolvaj
- Dezső Radány - 2. tolvaj
- Margit von Banlaky - Róza

== Bibliography ==
- Cunningham, John. Hungarian Cinema: From Coffee House to Multiplex. Wallflower Press, 2004.
