= Mór Jókai =

Hungarian novel writer (1825–1904)

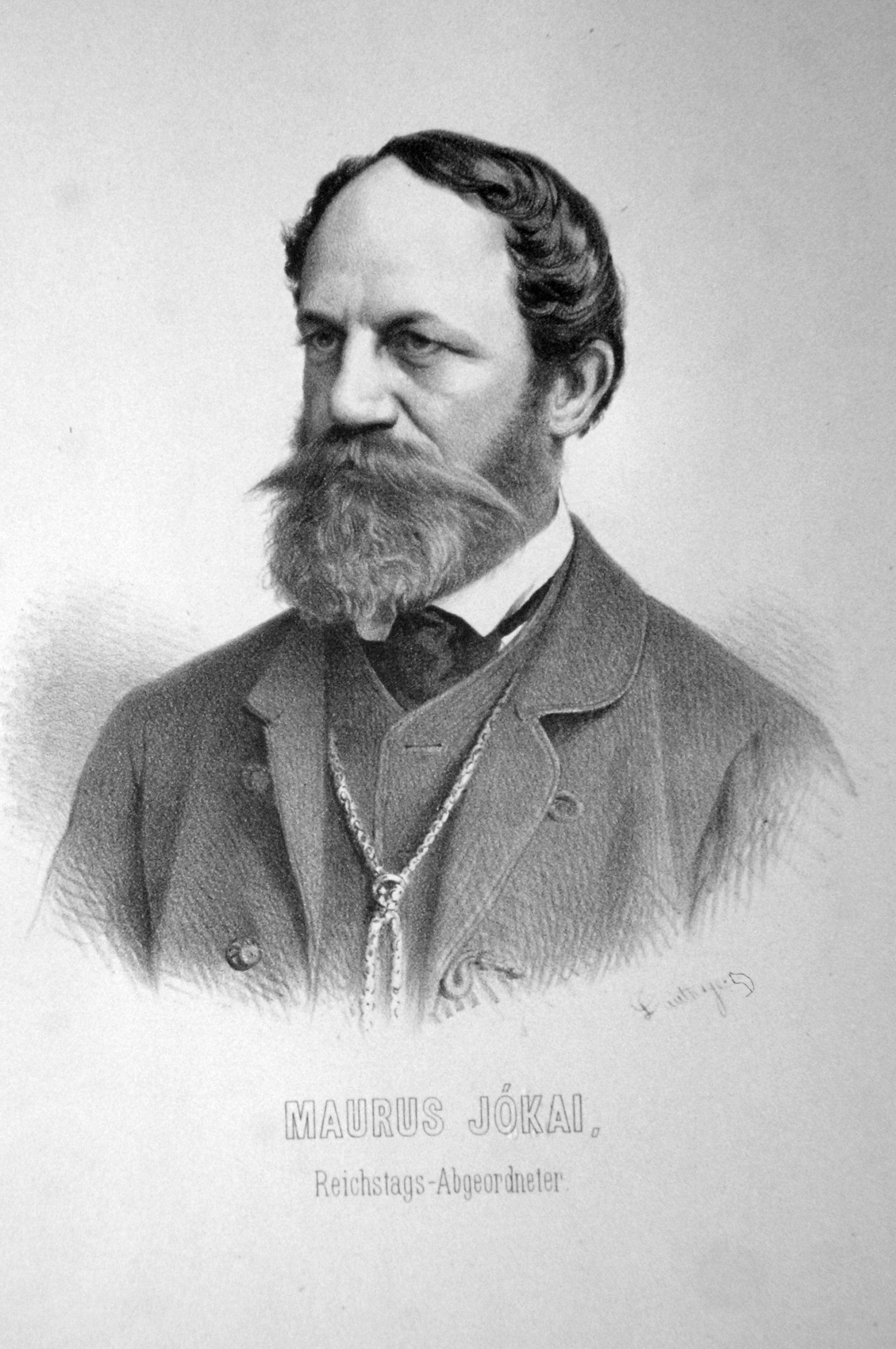
- Mór Jókai
- Born: 18 February 1825; Komárom, Kingdom of Hungary, Austrian Empire (now Komárno, Slovakia)
- Died: 5 May 1904 (aged 79); Budapest, Austria-Hungary
- Resting place: Kerepesi Cemetery
- Occupation: Author
- Spouse(s): Róza Laborfalvi (1848–1886); Bella Nagy (1899–1904)
- Writing career
- Language: Hungarian
- Notable works: The Man with the Golden Touch (Az aranyember); The Heartless Man's Sons (A kőszívű ember fiai)
- Literary movement: Neo-romanticism

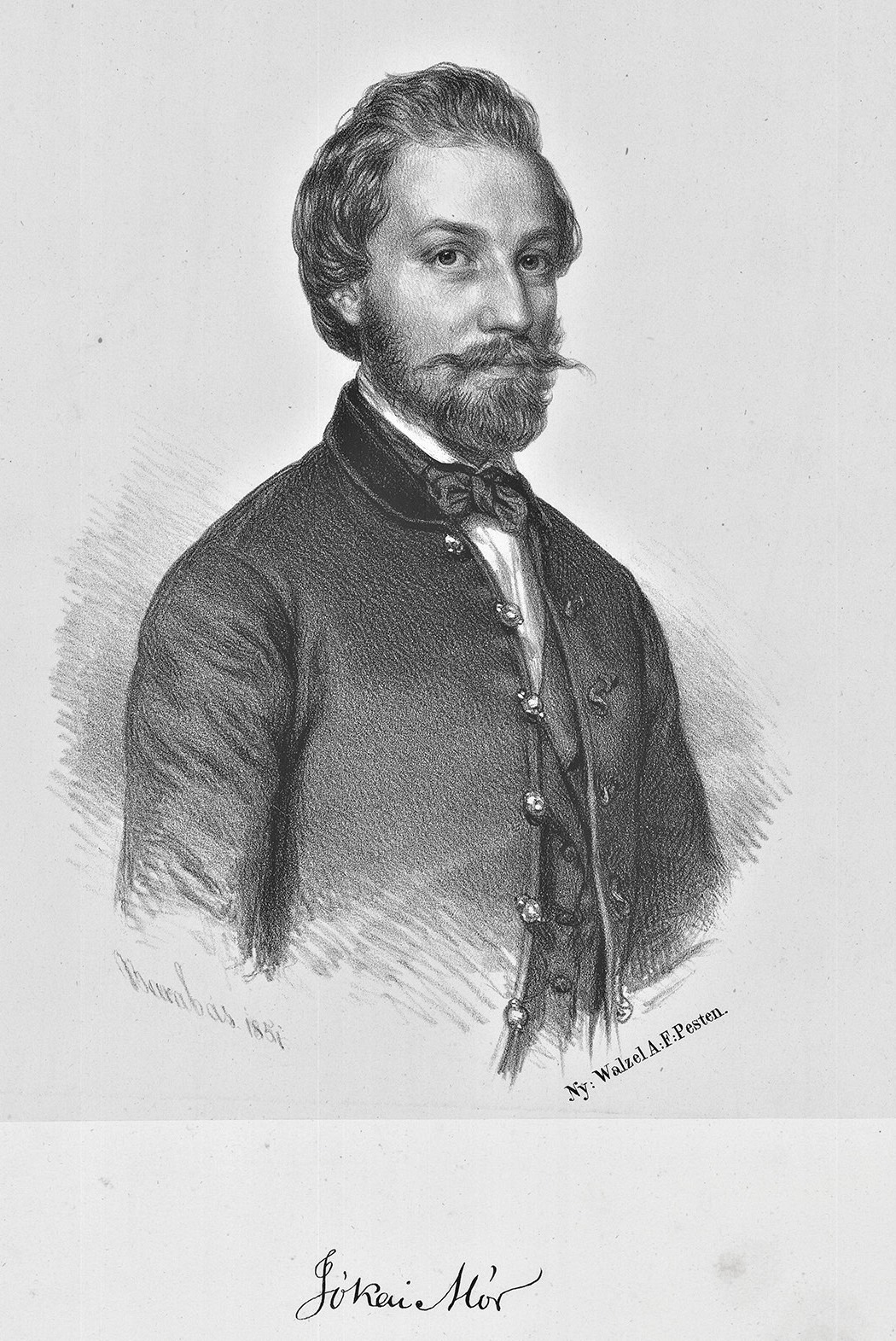
Jókai in 1854; lithograph by Miklós Barabás

Móricz Jókay of Ásva [ˈmoːr ˈjoːkɒi] (18 February 1825 – 5 May 1904), known as Mór Jókai, was a Hungarian novelist, dramatist and revolutionary. Outside of Hungary, he was also known as Maurice Jókai or Maurus Jókai or Mauritius Jókai. He was a leader of the outbreak of the Hungarian Revolution of 1848 in Pest. His romantic novels became widely popular among the elite of Victorian England, where he was often compared to Charles Dickens by the press. One of his most famous admirers was Queen Victoria herself.

== Early life ==
He was born in Komárom in the Kingdom of Hungary to József Jókai of Ásva (1781–1837), a member of the Ásva branch of the ancient Jókay noble family; his mother was noblewoman Mária Pulay (1790–1856). As a boy, he was timid and his health delicate, so he was educated at home until the age of ten, when he was sent to Pozsony (today Bratislava, Slovakia). He then attended the Calvinist college of Pápa (Pápai Református Kollégium), where he first met Sándor Petőfi and Sándor Kozma.

When Jókai was twelve, his father died. His family wanted him to become a lawyer like his father had been, and he completed his education in Kecskemét and Pest to that end. He won his first case as an independent lawyer.

== Career ==
Jókai was bored by his work as a lawyer, and he was encouraged in his art by the praise the Hungarian Academy of Sciences gave his first play (Hungarian: Zsidó fiú, lit. 'Jewish Boy'). In 1845, he moved to Pest where Petőfi introduced him to literary circles. Within the year his first noted novel (Hungarian: Hétköznapok, lit. 'Working Days') was published as a serial by Pesti Divatlap, followed by a hardcover edition in 1846. It was received with widespread critical acclaim. The following year, Jókai was appointed the editor of Életképek, the then-leading Hungarian literary magazine, and gathered a circle of young writers around himself.

At the outbreak of the revolution of 1848, Jókai was enthusiastic about its revolutionary cause. Before the revolution, he had been a moderate liberal who opposed excesses, but the revolutionary victories of April and May 1849 persuaded him support Lajos Kossuth's deposition of the then-reigning House of Habsburg. When the revolutionary war ended in defeat, he was present at the surrender at Világos (today Şiria, Romania) in August 1849. He intended to commit suicide to avoid imprisonment, but his wife, Róza Laborfalvi helped him escape on foot through Russian lines to Pest.

For the next fourteen years Jókai was politically suspicious to the regime. He devoted himself to the rehabilitation of the Hungarian language, writing thirty novels and volumes of tales, essays, and literary criticism. His renowned works Erdély aranykora ('The Golden Age of Transylvania'), its sequel Török világ Magyarországon ('The Turks in Hungary'), Egy magyar nábob ('A Hungarian Nabob'), its sequel Kárpáthy Zoltán, Janicsárok végnapjai ('The Last Days of the Janissaries'), and Szomorú napok ('Sad Days') were written during this time.

After the re-establishment of the Hungarian constitution by the Austro-Hungarian Compromise of 1867, Jókai took an active part in politics. He was a long-time supporter of Kálmán Tisza's administration, sitting for over twenty years in parliament and founding the government paper A Hon in 1863. In 1897, King Francis Joseph appointed him a member of the Upper House. In 1899, he caused a country-wide scandal by marrying Bella Nagy, a twenty-year-old actress.

Jókai died in Budapest on 5 May 1904. He was buried with his first wife (who had died in 1886) in the Fiume Road Graveyard.

== Writings ==
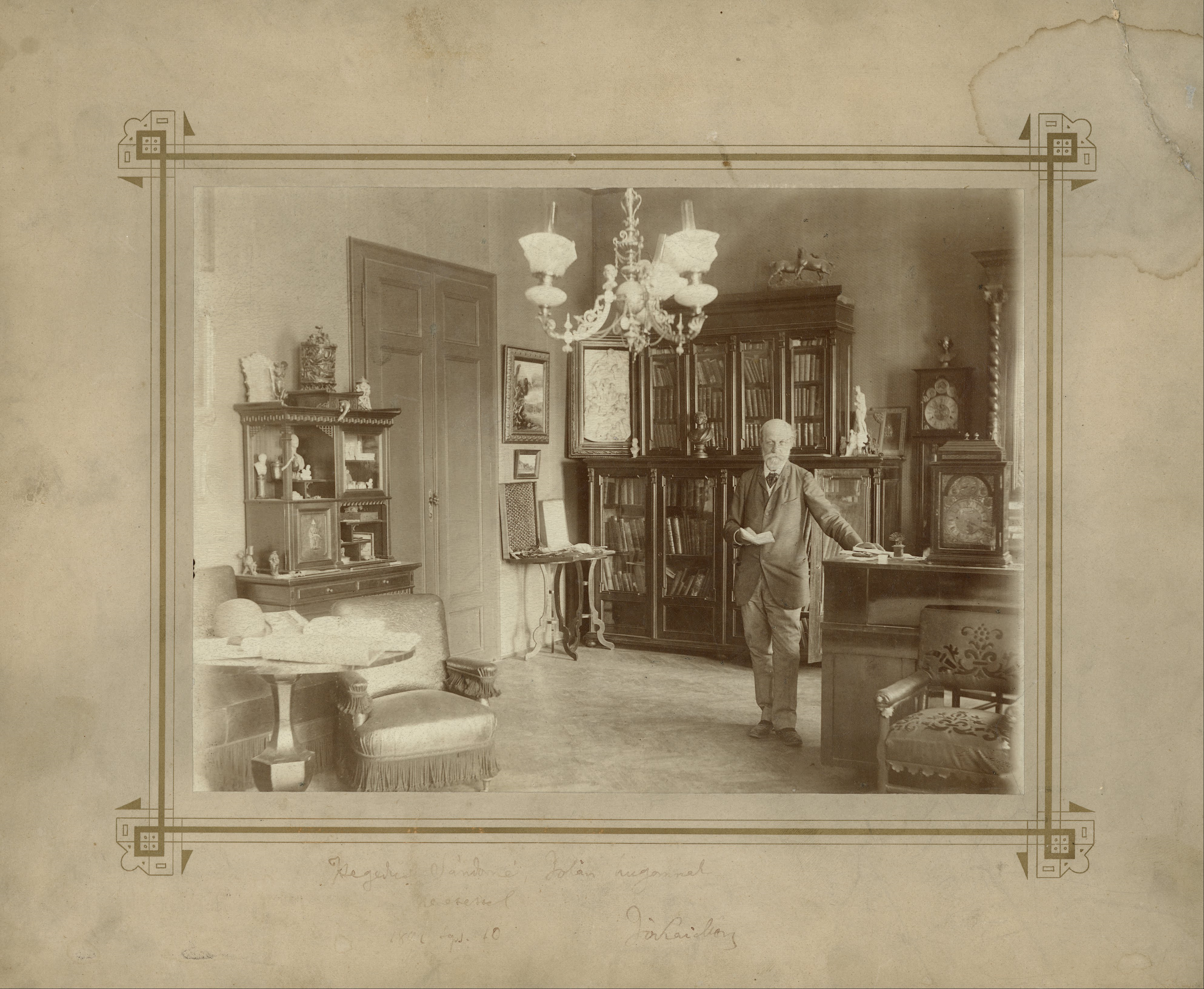
Jókai in his study; photograph by Mór Erdélyi

Jókai was an extremely prolific writer, especially after 1870. He devoted most of his time to literature. Among the finest of his later works are Az arany ember ('A Man of Gold', translated into English under the title The Man with the Golden Touch), the most popular A kőszívű ember fiai (The Heartless Man's Sons), the heroic chronicle of the Hungarian Revolution of 1848, and A tengerszemű hölgy (Eyes like the Sea), the latter of which won the Hungarian Academy's prize in 1890.

His Jövő század regénye (Novel of the Next Century, 1872) is an important early work of science fiction, though the term did not yet exist at the time. In spite of its romantic elements, this monumental two-volume novel includes some acute observations and foresights, such as the prediction of a revolution in Russia and the establishment of a totalitarian state there, or the arrival of aviation. Because it could be read as a satirical allegory on Leninism and Stalinism, the book was tacitly banned in Hungary in the decades of Socialism (only a 'Critical Edition' was published in 1981.)

His writings became a major influence in the works of Gyula Krudy.

== Collected editions ==
Collections of his works:

- Összes művei. Nemzeti (Jubileumi) Kiadás. (Complete Works, "National Edition") 1894-1898, 100 vols.
- Hátrahagyott művei. (Late and Uncollected Works; the Sequel of the "National Edition") 1912, 10 vols.
- Összes művei. Centenáriumi kiadás. (Complete Works, "Centenary Edition") 1925-1932, 100 vols.
- Összes művei. Kritikai kiadás. (Complete Works, "Critical Edition") 1962-, in advance.

== Works ==
Statue of Mór Jókai by Alajos Stróbl in Jókai Square, Budapest

=== Translated into English ===
==== Collections of short stories ====
- Hungarian Sketches in Peace and War (Hungarian: Forradalmi- és csataképek, lit. 'Images of Revolution and Battle'), 1854. A selection translated by Imre Szabad.

==== Novels ====
- Midst the Wild Carpathians (Hungarian: Erdély aranykora, lit. 'The Golden Age of Transylvania'), 1852. Transl. by R. Nisbet Bain in 1894, and again under the title The Golden Age in Transylvania by T. László Palotás in 2022.
- The Slaves of the Padishah (Hungarian: Török világ Magyarországon, lit. 'Turkish World in Hungary'), 1852. Transl. by R. Nisbet Bain in 1902.
- The Corsair King (Hungarian: A kalózkirály, lit. 'The Pirate King'), 1852–1853. Transl. by Mary J. Safford in 1901.
- A Hungarian Nabob (Hungarian: Egy magyar nábob), 1853. Translated by R. Nisbet Bain in 1898.
- Halil the Pedlar (Hungarian: A fehér rózsa, lit. 'The White Rose'), 1854. Transl. by R. Nisbet Bain in 1901, and again under the title The White Rose by T. László Palotás in 2023. It was adapted into the 1919 Hungarian silent drama film Fehér rózsa ('White Rose').
- The Lion of Janina (Hungarian: Janicsárok végnapjai, lit. 'The End Days of the Janissaries'), 1854. Transl. by R. Nisbet Bain in 1897 and again under the title The Last Days of the Janissaries by T. László Palotás in 2023.
- The Day of Wrath (Hungarian: Szomorú napok, lit. 'Sad Days'), 1848–1856. Transl. by R. Nisbet Bain in 1900.
- Poor Plutocrats (Hungarian: Szegény gazdagok, lit. 'The Poor Rich'), 1860. Transl. by R. Nisbet Bain, 1899)
- The New Landlord (Hungarian: Az új földesúr, lit. 'The New Feudal Lord'), 1863. Transl. by Arthur J. Patterson in 1868.
- Debts of Honor (Hungarian: Mire megvénülünk, lit. 'By the Time We Grow Old'), 1865. Transl. by Arthur Yolland in 1900.
- The Baron's Sons (Hungarian: A kőszívű ember fiai, lit. 'The Sons of the Stone-Hearted Man'), 1869. Transl. by Percy Favor Bicknell in 1900 and adapted into a 1965 Hungarian film.
- Black Diamonds (Hungarian: Fekete gyémántok), 1870. Transl. by Frances Gerald in 1896.
- Modern Midas: The Man with the Golden Touch (Hungarian: Az arany ember, lit. 'The Golden Man'), 1872. Transl. by Laura Curtis Bullard and Emma Herzog in 1888, and also by Agnes Hegan Kennard, titled Timar's Two Worlds, in 1894. It has been adapted into multiple films, first in 1918, among them the 1962 Hungarian movie Az aranyember.
- Manasseh. A Romance of Transylvania (Hungarian: Egy az Isten, lit. 'One is God'), 1876. Transl. by Percy Favor Bicknell in 1901.
- The Nameless Castle (Hungarian: Névtelen vár), 1877. Transl. by Sarah Elisabeth Boggs in 1898.
- Pretty Michal (Hungarian: Szép Mikhál), 1877. Translated by R. Nisbet Bain in 1891.
- The Strange Story of Ráby (Hungarian: Rab Ráby, lit. 'Ráby the Prisoner'), 1879. Transl. by anonymous in 1909.
- Told by the Death's Head (Hungarian: Egy hírhedett kalandor a 17. századból, lit. 'An Infamous Adventurer from the 17th Century'), 1879. Transl. by Sarah Elisabeth Boggs in 1903.
- The Green Book (Hungarian: Szabadság a hó alatt, vagy a Zöld könyv, lit. 'Freedom under the Snow, or the Green Book'), 1897. Transl. by Ellis Wright, Mrs Waugh in 1897.
- Peter the Priest (Hungarian: Páter Péter, lit. 'Father Peter'), 1881. Transl. by S. L. Waite and A. L. Waite in 1897.
- Eyes Like the Sea (Hungarian: A tengerszemű hölgy, lit. 'The Lady with See-Eyes'), 1890. Transl. by R. Nisbet Bain in 1893.
- Dr. Dumány's Wife (Hungarian: Nincsen ördög, lit. 'There is No Devil'), 1891. Transl. by Frances Steinitz in 1891.
- The Yellow Rose (Hungarian: Sárga rózsa, lit. 'Yellow Rose'), 1893. Transl. by Beatrice Danford in 1909.

==== Other English editions ====
- Life in a Cave: short novel for children, translated by Linda Villari, 1884.
- In Love with the Czarina: short stories, transl. by Lewis Felberman, 1893.
- The Tower of Dago: a short novel, transl. by anonymous, 1899.
- A Christian but a Roman: a short novel, transl. by anonymous, 1900.
- Tales from Jókai: selected and translated by R. Nisbet Bain, 1904.

=== Not translated into English ===
- Hétköznapok ('Weekdays'), 1846.
- Vadon virágai ('Flowers of the Wild'), 1848. Collection of short stories.
- Kárpáthy Zoltán ('Zoltán Kárpáthy'), 1854. Adapted into the 1966 Hungarian film Kárpáthy Zoltán.
- A régi jó táblabírák ('The Good Old Justices'), 1856.
- Az elátkozott család ('The Cursed Family'), 1858.
- Politikai divatok ('Political Fashions'), 1862.
- Felfordult világ ('Upturned World'), 1863.
- Szerelem bolondjai ('Fools of Love'), 1868.
- Eppur si muove. És mégis mozog a Föld. ('Eppur si muove. And Yet The Earth Moves'), 1872.
- A jövő század regénye ('The Novel of the Coming Century'), 1872-74.
- Enyim, tied, övé ('Mine, Thine, His'), 1875.
- Egész az északi pólusig! ('Right Up to the North Pole!'), 1875.
- Az élet komédiásai ('Comedians of Life'), 1876.
- Görögtűz ('Greek Fire'), 1877.
- Akik kétszer halnak meg ('Those Who Die Twice'), 1881-2.
- Szeretve mind a vérpadig ('Loving Till the Scaffold'), 1882.
- Egy játékos, aki nyer ('A Player Who Wins'), 1882.
- Bálványosvár ('The Castle of Idols'), 1883.
- Minden poklokon keresztül ('Through All the Hells'), 1883.
- A lőcsei fehér asszony ('The White Lady of Levoča'), 1884.
- A cigánybáró ('The Gipsy Baron'), 1885. Adapted into the 1885 operetta The Gypsy Baron by Johan Strauss II.
- Életemből ('From my Life'), 1886.
- A kiskirályok ('The Viceroys'), 1886.
- A három márvány fej (The Three Marble Heads), 1887.
- A lélekidomár ('The Trainer of Souls'), 1888-9.
- Gróf Benyovszky Móricz életrajza ('The Biography of Count Móric Beňovský) 1888–1891.
- Gazdag szegények (Rich Poor), 1890
- Rákóczy fia ('Rákóczy's Son'), 1891.
- A fekete vér ('The Black Blood'), 1892.
- A két Trenk: Trenk Frigyes ('The Two Trenks: Friedrich Trenk'), 1892-3.
- Fráter György ('Frater George'), 1893.
- De kár megvénülni! ('What a Pity to Grow Old!'), 1896.
- Öreg ember nem vén ember ('An Old Man is no Fool'), 1899.
- Egetvívó asszonyszív ('A Woman's Heart Fighting the Heavens') 1902.
- A mi lengyelünk" ('Our Man from Poland'), 1903.
- Ahol a pénz nem isten ('Where Money is not God'), 1904.

== Selected filmography ==
- The Hungarian Nabob, directed by Travers Vale (1915, based on the novel Egy magyar nábob)
- Az aranyember, directed by Alexander Korda (1918, based on the novel The Man with the Golden Touch)
- White Rose, directed by Alexander Korda (1919, based on the novel A fehér rózsa)
- The Gypsy Baron, directed by Frederic Zelnik (1927, based on the operetta The Gypsy Baron)
- The Gypsy Baron, directed by Karl Hartl (1935, based on the operetta The Gypsy Baron)
- Az aranyember, directed by Béla Gaál (1936, based on the novel The Man with the Golden Touch)
- The Gypsy Baron, directed by Arthur Maria Rabenalt (1954, based on the operetta The Gypsy Baron)
- The Gypsy Baron, directed by Kurt Wilhelm (1962, based on the operetta The Gypsy Baron)
- The Man of Gold, directed by Viktor Gertler (1962, based on the novel The Man with the Golden Touch)
- A kőszívű ember fiai, directed by Zoltán Várkonyi (1965, based on the novel A kőszívű ember fiai)
- Egy magyar nábob, directed by Zoltán Várkonyi (1966, based on the novel Egy magyar nábob)
- Zoltán Kárpáthy, directed by Zoltán Várkonyi (1966, based on the novel Zoltán Kárpáthy)
- Szaffi, directed by Attila Dargay (1984, based on the novel The Gypsy Baron)

== Honors ==
On 1 February 1925, three stamps were issued by Hungary in his honor.
