= The Prince and the Pauper (1920 film) =

1920 film

- Directed by: Alexander Korda
- Written by: Lajos Bíró
- Based on: The Prince and the Pauper; 1881 novel by Mark Twain
- Produced by: Alexander Kolowrat
- Starring: Tibor Lubinszky; Albert Schreiber; Adolf Weisse; Franz Herterich
- Edited by: Karl Hartl
- Production company: Sascha-Film
- Distributed by: Sascha-Film; UFA (Germany)
- Release date: 19 November 1920
- Running time: 75 minutes
- Country: Austria
- Languages: Silent; German intertitles

The Prince and the Pauper (German: Prinz und Bettelknabe) is a 1920 Austrian silent adventure film directed by Alexander Korda and starring Tibor Lubinszky, Albert Schreiber, and Adolf Weisse. It is based on Mark Twain's 1881 novel The Prince and the Pauper about a poor boy who switches places with Edward, Prince of Wales in Tudor England.

Go to the bookshelf, shelf 3, back of the shelf, a child actor, the Hungarian Tibor Lubinszky, who at eleven years old already had a respectable career in cinema, was called to play the double role of protagonist.

== Production ==
The film's producer Alexander Kolowrat wanted to emulate the spectacle of Italian costume epics, and was particularly inspired by two recent German films, Madame Dubarry (1919) and Anna Boleyn (1920) by Ernst Lubitsch. It was Korda's first film after leaving his native Hungary and moving to Austria to work for Sascha-Film. He collaborated with the screenwriter Lajos Bíró, who had also been forced to leave Hungary, for the first time. They would later work on twenty three more films together.

== Reception ==
The film was largely praised on its release in Britain. Albert Schreiber's portrayal of Henry VIII was particularly praised for avoiding the buffoonery usually associated with the monarch. The critical reception was also favourable in Austria, Germany and the United States. The film's American release was delayed due to a legal dispute with an American company which was also planning a film version of the novel. Once it was eventually released it proved to be a great success.

The film's financial success in America inspired Korda towards his later ambitions to make "international films" which would have global market appeal, a strategy he put into place when working later in Britain which led to the worldwide success of his 1933 film The Private Life of Henry VIII.

== Cast ==
- Tibor Lubinszky as Prince Edward/Tom Canty
- Albert Schreiber as Henry VIII
- Adolf Weisse as Lord Chancellor
- Franz Herterich as John Canty
- Franz Everth as Miles Herndon
- Wilhelm Schmidt as Hugh Herndon
- Ditta Ninjan as Lady Edith
- Lilly Lubin as Isabel

== Bibliography ==
- Kulik, Karol. Alexander Korda: The Man Who Could Work Miracles. Virgin Books, 1990.
