= Tutyu and Totyo =

- Hungarian: Tutyu és Totyó
- Directed by: Alexander Korda
- Starring: Gusztáv Vándory
- Release date: 1915
- Country: Hungary
- Languages: Silent; Hungarian intertitles

Tutyu and Totyo (Hungarian: Tutyu és Totyó) is a 1915 Hungarian silent film directed by Alexander Korda and starring Gusztáv Vándory.
