= General Babka (1930 film) =

1930 film

- Directed by: Dezső Kertész
- Starring: Wolf Albach-Retty; Angelo Ferrari; Mary Kid
- Production company: Listo Film
- Release date: 23 May 1930
- Country: Austria
- Language: German

General Babka is a 1930 Austrian film directed by Dezső Kertész and starring Wolf Albach-Retty, Angelo Ferrari, and Mary Kid.

== Cast ==
In alphabetical order

- Wolf Albach-Retty
- Angelo Ferrari
- Mizzi Griebl
- Eugen Günther
- Mary Kid
- Rina Marsa
- Vera Salvotti
- Gyula Szőreghy

== Bibliography ==
- Büttner, Elisabeth; Dewald, Christian (2002). Das tägliche Brennen: eine Geschichte des österreichischen Films von den Anfängen bis 1945 (in German). Vol. 1. Salzburg: Residenz. ISBN 978-3-7017-1261-8.
