= Vica the Canoeist =

1933 film

- Directed by: Béla Gaál
- Written by: Béla Gaál; László Vadnay
- Produced by: Antal Güttler; Elemér Lajtos
- Starring: Erzsi Paál; Sándor Radó; Dezsõ Kertész
- Cinematography: István Somkúti
- Music by: Alfréd Márkus; László Vadnay
- Production company: Genius Film
- Release date: 1 June 1933
- Running time: 74 minutes
- Country: Hungary
- Language: Hungarian

Vica the Canoeist (Hungarian: Vica, a vadevezös) is a 1933 Hungarian comedy film directed by Béla Gaál and starring Erzsi Paál, Sándor Radó and Dezsõ Kertész. It was shot at the Hunnia Studios in Budapest. The film's sets were designed by the art director Márton Vincze.

== Cast ==
- Erzsi Paál as Vica
- Erzsi Raffay as Klári
- Sándor Radó as Csalogány Miklós
- Dezsõ Kertész as Horvath Feri
- Jenö Herczeg as Hacsek
- Vilmos Komlós as Sajó
- László Dezsõffy as Vendég
- Lili Fehér as Takarítónõ
- Erzsébet Gyöngyössy as Pénztárosnõ
- Miklós László as Pincér
- Sándor Peti as Sipeki
- Irma Pintér as Vica anyja
- Teréz Kürti as Rádiót hallgató hölgy

== Bibliography ==
- Juhász, István. Kincses magyar filmtár 1931-1944: az eredeti forgatókönyvből 1931 és 1944 között létrejött hazai mozgóképekről. Kráter, 2007.
- Rîpeanu, Bujor. (ed.) International Directory of Cinematographers, Set- and Costume Designers in Film: Hungary (from the beginnings to 1988). Saur, 1981.
