= Dezső Kertész =

Hungarian actor, director

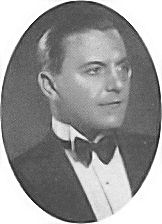
- Born: Kertész Dezső; 2 September 1890; Békés, Austria-Hungary
- Died: 18 October 1965 (aged 75); Budapest, Hungarian People's Republic
- Occupations: Actor, director
- Years active: 1916–1961

Dezső Kertész (2 September 1890 – 18 October 1965) was a Hungarian film actor and director.

Kertész was born in Békés and died in Budapest at age 73.

== Selected filmography ==
Actor

- The Village Rogue (1916)
- The Laughing Saskia (1916)
- Anna Karenina (1918)
- Number 111 (1919)
- Dracula's Death (1921)
- Vica the Canoeist (1933)
- The Hen-Pecked Husband (1938)
- Estélyi ruha kötelezö (1942)
- Changing the Guard (1942)
- Disillusion (1943)

Director

- Rumpelstilzchen (1923)
- General Babka (1930)

== Bibliography ==
- Kulik, Karol (1990) [1975]. Alexander Korda: The Man Who Could Work Miracles. London: Virgin Books. ISBN 978-0-86369-446-2.
