= The Unknown Tomorrow =

1923 film

- Directed by: Alexander Korda
- Written by: Sydney Garrick (play); Alexander Korda; Ernest Vajda
- Produced by: Alexander Korda
- Starring: Werner Krauss; María Corda; Olga Limburg; Carl Ebert
- Cinematography: Sophus Wangöe
- Edited by: Karl Hartl
- Production company: Korda Film
- Release date: 10 October 1923
- Running time: 90 minutes
- Country: Germany
- Languages: Silent; German intertitles

The Unknown Tomorrow (German: Das unbekannte Morgen) is a 1923 German silent drama film directed by Alexander Korda and starring Werner Krauss, María Corda, and Olga Limburg.

== Production and reception ==
The Unknown Tomorrow was the first film made by Korda in Germany, after he had left Austria following the failure of Samson and Delilah. The film was a financial success, and Korda used his share of the profits to buy a stake in the film distribution company FIHAG.

Werner Krauss's performance has been noted for its expressionist acting, even though much of the rest of the film is non-expressionist.

== Cast ==
- Werner Krauss as Marc Muradock
- María Corda as Stella Manners
- Olga Limburg as Zoé, Maid
- Carl Ebert as Gordon Manners
- Louis Ralph as Alphonse, Muradock's accomplice
- Friedrich Kühne as Raorama Singh
- Antonie Jaeckel as the Aunt
- Paul Lukas as Minor role

== Plot ==
A wife is wrongly believed of adultery by her husband who leaves her. She then struggles to prove her innocence and win him back while foiling the machinations of an admirer of hers who wishes to keep her apart from her husband.

== Bibliography ==
- Kulik, Karol. Alexander Korda: The Man Who Could Work Miracles. Virgin Books, 1990.
