= Cyclomen =

Cyclomen may refer to:

- Cyclamen, the species
- Danazol, by trade name
