= María Corda =

Hungarian actress (1898–1976)

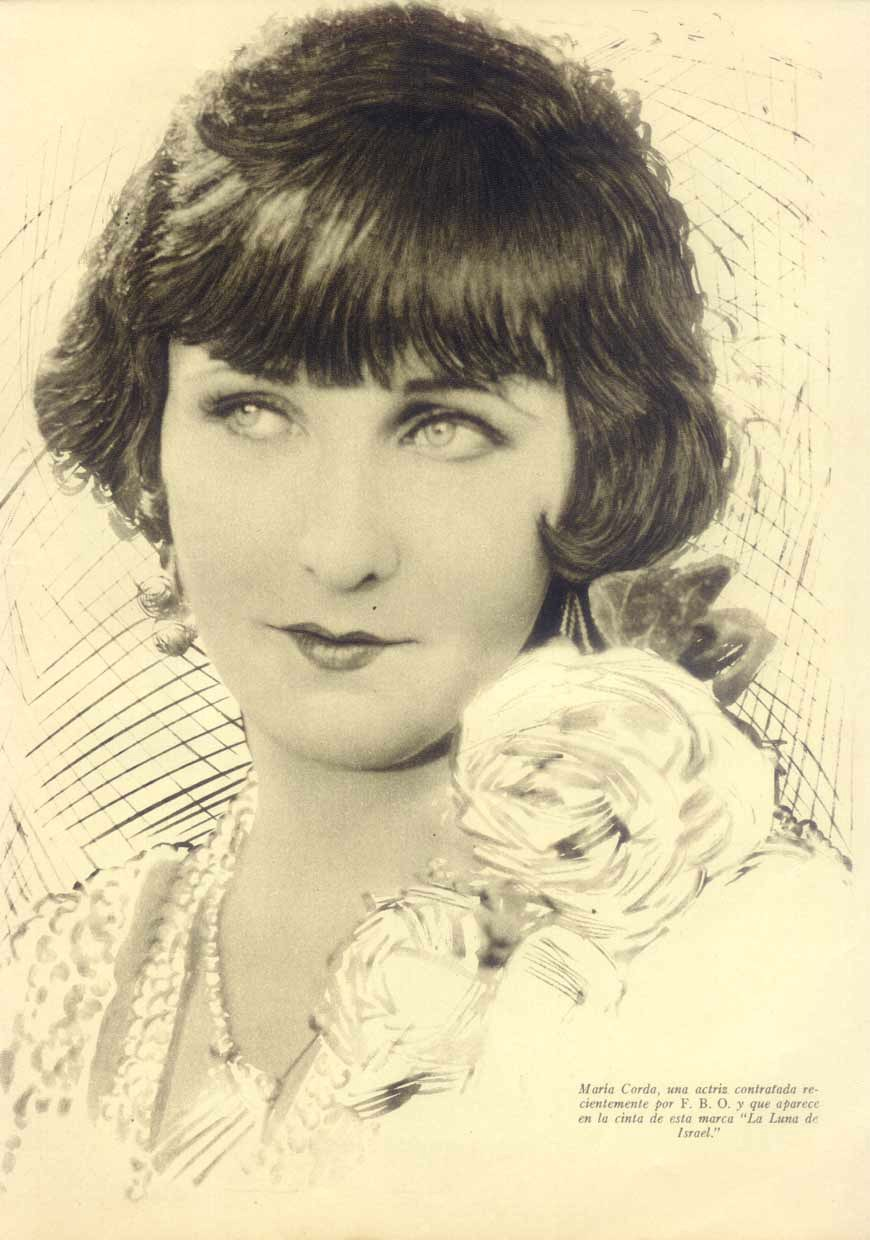
- Corda in 1924
- Born: Mária Antónia Farkas; 4 May 1898; Déva, Kingdom of Hungary (present-day Deva, Romania)
- Died: 15 February 1976 (aged 77); Thônex, Switzerland
- Burial place: St Paul's Church, Horn Hill, Chalfont St Peter, England
- Other names: Mária Korda; Mária Antónia Farkas
- Occupation: Actress
- Years active: 1919–1929
- Spouse: Alexander Korda (m. 1919; div. 1930)
- Children: 1

María Corda (born Mária Antónia Farkas; Hungarian: Korda Mária; 4 May 1898 – 15 February 1976) was a Hungarian actress and a star of the silent film era in Germany and Austria.

== Biography ==
She began her acting career in the theatres of Budapest in the early days of World War I and soon after the break-up of Austria-Hungary she also began to work in the film industry. Her first role was in Se ki, se be in 1919, directed by the Hungarian director, Korda Sandor, who would come to be known as Alexander Korda. She married Korda, who was then the leading director in Hungary's fledgling film industry, in 1919. He featured her in three films that year White Rose (Fehér rózsa), Ave Caesar! and Number 111 (A 111-es), all of which he directed.

The young couple was affected by the turmoil in Hungary that followed the end of the Austro-Hungarian Empire. For a brief time, Hungary was a badly-run democracy, then a Communist dictatorship, and finally – with the support of Western forces – Miklós Horthy was put in place, turning Hungary into an authoritarian regency. Maria and Alexander had continued making films, no matter who was in power, with Maria as the most famous actress in Hungary and her husband its most important director.

However, her husband was grabbed by Horthy's secret police one day and vanished. Maria managed to get to her brother-in-law, Zoltan Korda, and between the two of them, they learned where Alexander was being held in a Budapest hotel which was notorious for having a torture chamber in its basement. Maria went to the British Military Mission, whose Brigadier was also on the board of Korda's film company and "with all the considerable passion at her disposal", as her nephew, Michael Korda, was to write in his biography of the family, convinced him that her husband must be freed or there would be an international scandal, one that would quite likely expose the British government's role in setting Horthy up as regent.

Her husband was freed and they then fled the country, relocating to Vienna, a logical choice since German was the second language of Hungary. This is where both Westernized their names, he to Alexander Korda and she, for obscure reasons, to "Maria Corda" – with a C. In Vienna, he started directing films by 1920, and the couple welcomed their only child, Peter Vincent Korda, in 1921.

Corda soon became a star of the Austrian silent screen, directed by her husband in such epic films as Samson und Delila (1922) and Michael Curtiz's Die Sklavenkönigin (1924). Gli ultimi giorni di Pompei (1926) saw her take a leading role in an Italian film of a similar style.

In 1926, Corda and her husband moved to Berlin where their success as a team – he directing, Maria starring – soon won them enough attention that Maria was offered a contract by First National, a Hollywood studio, and her husband was signed, also, as a kind of package deal. They sailed to America that year, and settled in Beverly Hills, California.

Unfortunately, Corda could not duplicate her European success in Hollywood. She appeared in Korda's early productions there, most notably The Private Life of Helen of Troy (1927), but none of the films were very successful. Unfortunately, like many other silent film stars of the day, her Hollywood career came to an abrupt end in 1928 with the coming of sound, since she had learned little English and what she did know was heavily accented. When his own contracts were up, Alexander availed himself of the liberality of California's divorce laws, ending a marriage that had been tempestuous for many years. He returned to Europe, soon establishing himself as the centre of British filmmaking for the next quarter-century.

Corda moved to New York, where she wrote a number of novels. The later years of her life were spent in the vicinity of Geneva in Switzerland. When her ex-husband was knighted in 1942, Corda insisted that she should be called "Lady Korda", although Korda was remarried by that time, and after Korda's death she made several highly publicized attempts to assert herself as his widow and claim an inheritance, but these failed in the British courts, since by then her ex-husband had married for a third time.

Korda continued to pay her a substantial alimony until his death in 1956. She had saved his life in Hungary when she was a top European star who could not be refused. According to his nephew's biography, this prevented Korda "from ever breaking Corda's hold on him", despite his subsequent marriages.

== Partial filmography ==
- Ave Caesar! (1919) as A cigányleány
- Neither at Home or Abroad (Se ki, se be, 1919) as Antónia Farkas
- White Rose (Fehér rózsa, 1919) as Gül Bejazet
- Kutató Sámuel (1919)
- Number 111 (A 111-es, 1920) as Olga / Vera (as Antónia Farkas)
- Totote di Gyp (1921)
- La vita e la commedia (1921)
- Il sogno d'una notte d'estate a Venezia (1921)
- Masters of the Sea (1922)
- Samson und Delila (1922) as Julia Sorel / Delila, Abimelech's wife
- A Vanished World (1922) as Anny Lind
- The Unknown Tomorrow (1923) as Stella Manners
- Everybody's Woman (1924) as Theres Huber
- Tragedy in the House of Habsburg (1924) as Maria Vetsera
- The Moon of Israel (Die Sklavenkönigin or The Slave Queen, 1924) as Merapi, The Moon of Israel
- Holnap kezdödik az élet (1924) as Maria Korda
- L'uomo più allegro di Vienna (1925) as Katy
- Dancing Mad (1925) as Lucille Chauvelin
- The Last Days of Pompeii (Gli ultimi giorni di Pompeii, 1926) as Nydia
- Madame Wants No Children (1926) as Elyane Parizot
- A Modern Dubarry (1927) as Toinette
- The Guardsman (1927) as Schauspielerin
- The Private Life of Helen of Troy (1927) as Helen of Troy
- Batalla de damas (1928)
- Tesha (1928) as Tesha
- A Modern Casanova (1928)
- Love and the Devil (1929) as Giovanna
- Heilige oder Dirne (1929) as Lydia, Thereses Freundin
- Queen of Fashion (1929) as Marion Gutman
- Rund um die Liebe (1929) (archive footage)
- Die große Sehnsucht (1930) as Herself (final film role)
