= Róza Laborfalvi =

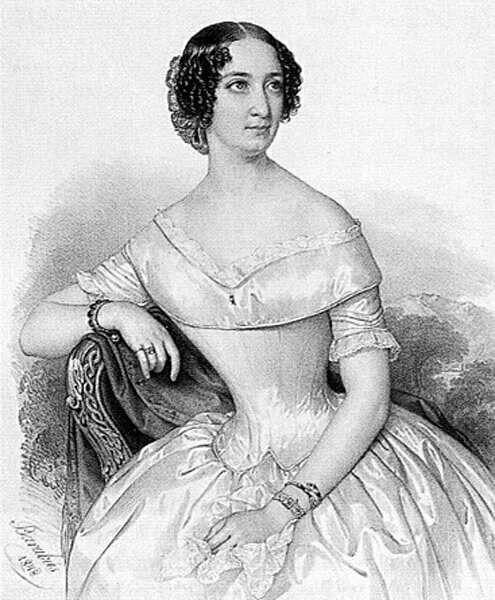
- Róza Laborfalvi on a lithograph by Miklós Barabás, 1848
- Born: Judit Benke de Laborfalva; 8 April 1817; Miskolc, Kingdom of Hungary
- Died: 25 September 1886 (aged 69); Budapest, Austria-Hungary
- Occupation: actress
- Spouse: Mór Jókai de Ásva

Róza Laborfalvi (née Judit Benke de Laborfalva; 8 April 1817 – 20 November 1886) was a Hungarian noblewoman, actress and wife of novelist Mór Jókai de Ásva.

== Early life ==
She was the daughter of actor and stage director József Benke de Laborfalva (1781–1855) and Zsuzsanna Rácz de Welesz. Her father was a Székely noble.

== Career ==
She started her career in the Castle Theatre of Buda in 1833. From 1837 she played in the National Theatre of Pest. Many have praised her beautiful alto voice, her looks, her talent for recitation and her expressive glance.

On 15 March 1848, she met the writer Mór Jókai at a performance of József Katona's The Viceroy. They married in the same year. Their marriage caused a scandal; several of the writer's friends (among them Sándor Petőfi) were against the marriage, mostly because she had a 12-year-old illegitimate daughter, Róza Benke, whose father was the actor Márton Lendvay. The opponents of the marriage were reconciled when Laborfalvi saved Jókai's life during the revolution of 1848/49. (Róza Benke later had an illegitimate daughter herself, Róza the youngest, who later married the painter Árpád Feszty).

Until her retirement in 1859 Laborfalvi was the most successful actress of the era. On 3 September 1857, the newly built National Theatre of Miskolc opened with her guest performance and Jókai's speech. She later appeared on the same stage in 1883, as her last performance.

== Her most important roles ==
Gertrudis (The Viceroy); Volumina (Shakespeare: Coriolanus); Mary, Queen of Scots (Schiller); Lady Macbeth (Macbeth); Goneril (King Lear); Orsina (Lessing: Emilia Galotti); Lady Milford (Schiller: Intrigue and Love).
