= The Village Rogue (1916 film) =

1916 film

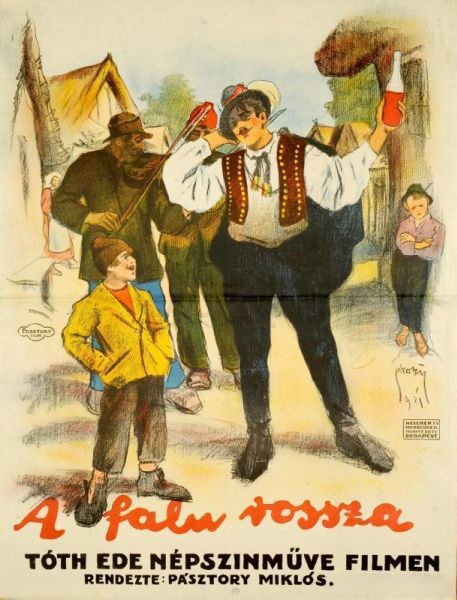
- Directed by: Miklós Pásztory
- Written by: Ede Tóth (play); Miklós Pásztory; Ladislaus Vajda
- Starring: Helene von Bolváry; Dezső Kertész; Péter Andorffy
- Cinematography: Béla Zsitkovszky
- Production company: Astra Filmgyár
- Distributed by: 69 minutes
- Release date: 16 February 1916
- Country: Hungary
- Languages: Silent; Hungarian intertitles

The Village Rogue (Hungarian: A Falu rossza) is a 1916 Hungarian silent drama film directed by Miklós Pásztory and starring Helene von Bolváry, Dezső Kertész, and Péter Andorffy. It was based on an 1875 play by Ede Tóth. An alternative translation of its title is Village Rascal.

== Cast ==
- Helene von Bolváry as Finum Rózsi
- Dezső Kertész as Lajos, Feledi fia
- Péter Andorffy as Gonosz Pista
- Ida Andorffy as Boriska
- Amália Jákó as Bátky Tercsa
- Mari K. Demjén as Gonosz Pista felesége
- József Kürthy as Feledi báró
- Jenõ Medgyaszay as Göndör Sándor
- Lajos Szõke as Jóska béres
- Sándor Szõke as Cigányprímás

== Bibliography ==
- Cunningham, John (2004). Hungarian Cinema: From Coffee House to Multiplex. London: Wallflower Press. ISBN 978-1-903364-79-6.
