= Cyclamen (film) =

- Directed by: Alexander Korda
- Release date: 1916
- Country: Hungary
- Languages: Silent; Hungarian intertitles

Cyclamen (Hungarian: Ciklámen) is a 1916 Hungarian silent film directed by Alexander Korda.

== Bibliography ==
- Kulik, Karol. Alexander Korda: The Man Who Could Work Miracles. Virgin Books, 1990.
