= Terňa =

- Municipality
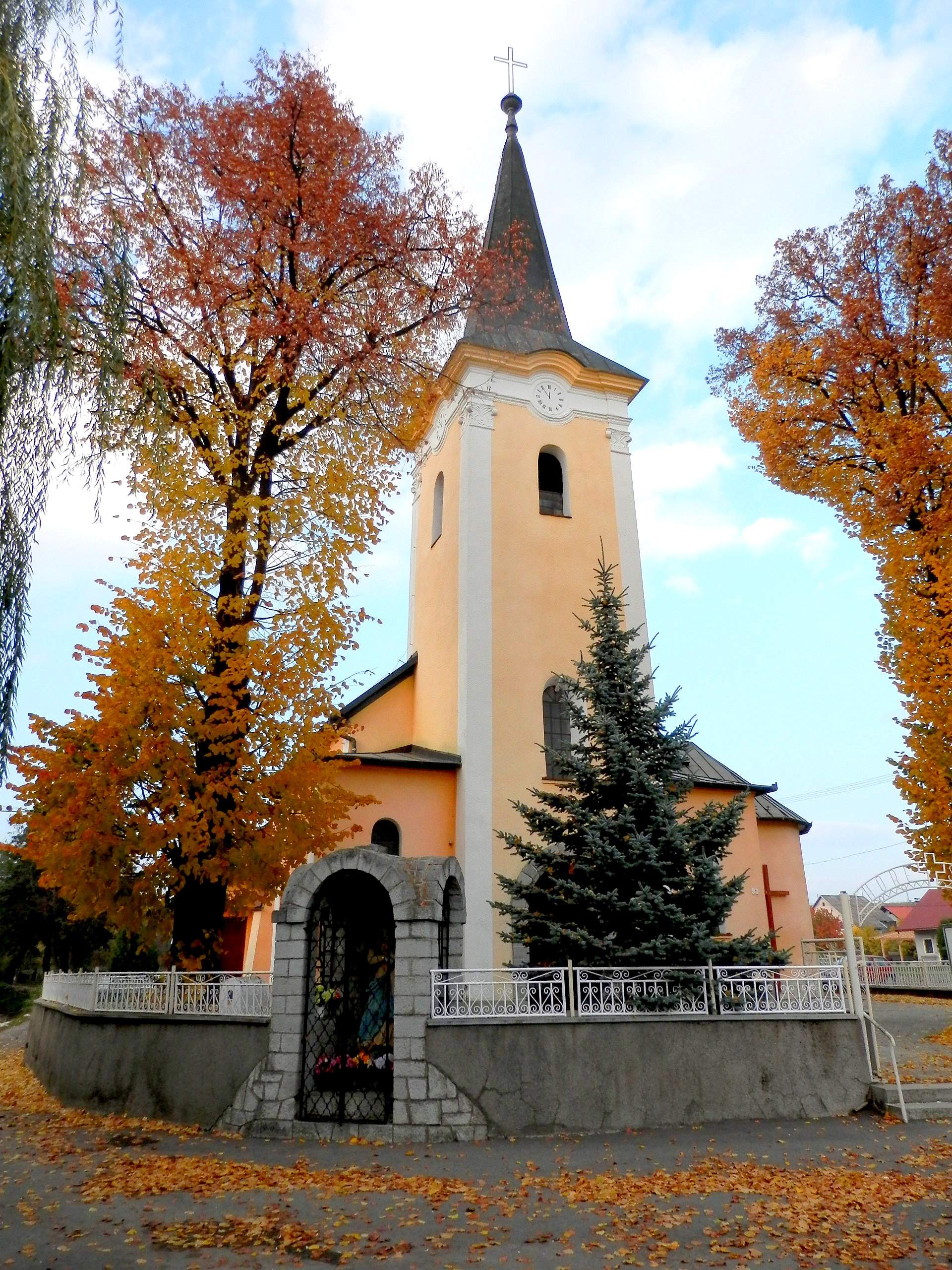

- Flag

- Location of Terňa in the Prešov Region Location of Terňa in Slovakia
- Coordinates: 49.12°N 21.23°E
- Country: Slovakia
- Region: Prešov Region
- District: Prešov District
- First mentioned: 1259

Area
  - Total: 29.42 km^{2} (11.36 sq mi)
- Elevation: 450 m (1,480 ft)

Population (2025)
  - Total: 1,335
- Time zone: UTC+1 (CET)
  - Summer (DST): UTC+2 (CEST)
- Postal code: 826 7
- Area code: +421 51
- Vehicle registration plate (until 2022): PO
- Website: www.terna.sk

Terňa (Rusyn: Терня, Hungarian: Ternye) is a village in the Prešov District of the Prešov Region in eastern Slovakia.

== History ==
The first reference to Terňa in historical literature appears in 1259 when Béla IV of Hungary donated Terňa to a Šariš royal named Therne.

== Geography ==
The municipality lies at an altitude of 450 metres (1,480 ft) and covers an area of 29.42 km^{2} (11.36 sq mi) (2025).

== Population ==
Population statistic (10 years)
Year	1995	2005	2015	2025
Count	983	1086	1260	1335
Difference		+10.47%	+16.02%	+5.95%

Population statistic
Year	2024	2025
Count	1340	1335
Difference		−0.37%

It has a population of 1335 people (31 December 2025).

=== Ethnicity ===
Census 2021 (1+ %)
Ethnicity	Number	Fraction
Slovak	1256	95.51%
Romani	56	4.25%
Not found out	40	3.04%
Total	1315	

In year 2021 was 1315 people by ethnicity 1256 as Slovak, 56 as Romani, 40 as Not found out, 5 as Rusyn, 4 as Other, 2 as Ukrainian, 2 as Polish, 1 as Russian and 1 as Hungarian.

Note on population: The difference values of population numbers in the table "Population statistic" and in the sections "Ethnicity" & "Religion" is caused by the use of various statistical methods.

=== Religion ===
Census 2021 (1+ %)
Religion	Number	Fraction
Roman Catholic Church	1137	86.46%
None	67	5.1%
Greek Catholic Church	55	4.18%
Not found out	38	2.89%
Total	1315	

In year 2021 was 1315 people by religion 1137 from Roman Catholic Church, 67 from None, 55 from Greek Catholic Church, 38 from Not found out, 7 from Christian Congregations in Slovakia, 3 from Eastern Orthodox Church, 3 from Islam, 3 from Evangelical Church, 1 from Other and 1 from Ad hoc movements.
