= Yamata =

- Directed by: Alexander Korda
- Written by: László Vajda
- Produced by: Alexander Korda
- Starring: Emil Fenyvessy; Ila Lóth; Gábor Rajnay
- Cinematography: Gusztáv Mihály Kovács
- Production company: Councils' Republic
- Release date: 1919
- Country: Hungary
- Languages: Silent; Hungarian intertitles

Yamata is a 1919 Hungarian silent drama film directed by Alexander Korda and starring Emil Fenyvessy, Ila Lóth and Gábor Rajnay. The film was made for the state-owned Hungarian film industry during the Hungarian Soviet Republic, and concerns a black slave's revolt against his master. The film's apparent political leftism, along with that of Ave Caesar! (1919), led to Korda's arrest once the Soviet Republic collapsed and he fled Hungary in 1919 during the White Terror.

== Cast ==
- Emil Fenyvessy as Márki
- Ila Lóth as Ninette, the caretaker girl
- Gábor Rajnay as Yamata, the servant
- Gusztáv Vándory as Baron, Ninette's love
