= Alexander Korda =

British film director (1893–1956)

Sir Alexander Korda
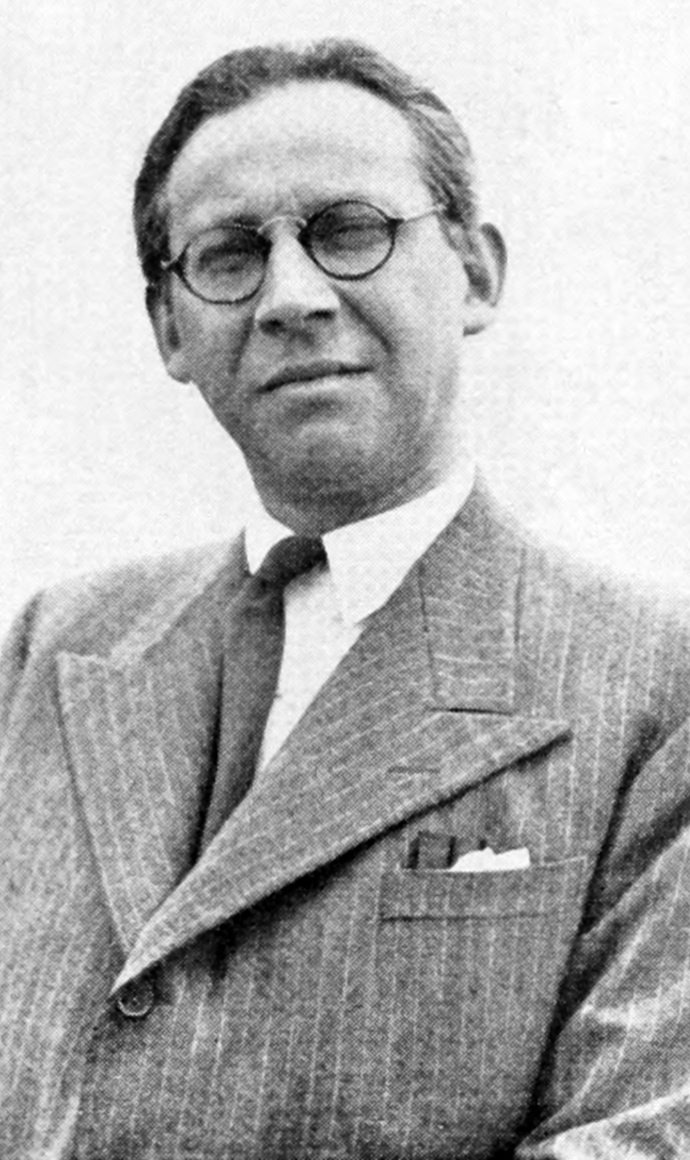
- Korda in 1936
- Born: Sándor László Kellner; 16 September 1893; Pusztatúrpásztó, Austria-Hungary (today part of Túrkeve, Hungary)
- Died: 23 January 1956 (aged 62); Kensington, London, England
- Occupations: Film director; producer; screenwriter
- Years active: 1914–1955
- Spouses: Maria Farkas (m. 1919; div. 1930) Merle Oberon (m. 1939; div. 1945) Alexandra Boycun (m. 1953)
- Children: 1
- Relatives: Zoltan Korda (brother); Vincent Korda (brother); Michael Korda (nephew); Chris Korda (great-niece)

Sir Alexander Korda (/ˈkɔːrdə/; born Sándor László Kellner; Hungarian: Korda Sándor; 16 September 1893 – 23 January 1956) was a Hungarian-born British film director, producer, and screenwriter, who founded his own film production studios and film distribution company.

Born in Hungary, where he began his career, he worked briefly in the Austrian and German film industries during the era of silent films, before being based in Hollywood from 1926 to 1930 for the first of his two brief periods there (the other was during World War II). The change led to a divorce from his first wife, the Hungarian film actress María Corda, who was unable to make the transition from silent films to "talkies" because of her Hungarian accent.

From 1930, Korda was active in the British film industry, and soon became one of its leading figures. He was the founder of London Films and, post-war, the owner of British Lion Films, a film distribution company. Korda produced many outstanding classics of the British film industry, including The Private Life of Henry VIII, Rembrandt, Things To Come, The Thief of Baghdad and The Third Man. In 1942, Korda became the first filmmaker to receive a knighthood.

== Personal background ==
Korda was born Sándor László Kellner into a Jewish family in Pusztatúrpásztó, Austria-Hungary. His parents were Henrik Kellner and Ernesztina Weisz. He had two younger brothers, Zoltan and Vincent, who also had careers in the film industry, often working with Alexander.

== Early career in European silent film ==
=== Films in Hungary ===
After the death of his father, Korda began writing film reviews to support his family. He also changed the family name, deriving the new name Korda from the Latin phrase "sursum corda" ("lift up your hearts").

Having been excused from military service in the Austro-Hungarian Army in the First World War, because he was short-sighted, Korda became an important figure in the Hungarian film industry, initially through his magazines Pesti Mozi, Mozihét and Világ. This led to invitations to write screenplays. His first script was for Watchhouse in the Carpathians (1914), which he also helped to direct. He also made a film with Gyula Zilahy, The Duped Journalist (1914), and directed Tutyu and Totyo (1915), The Officer's Swordknot (1915) and Lyon Lea (1915).

In 1916, Korda established his own production company, Corvin Film. Its first film was White Nights (1916), which was a big success. Korda went on to build Corvin into one of the largest film companies in Hungary with such productions as The Grandmother (1916), Tales of the Typewriter (1916), The Man with Two Hearts (1916), The One Million Pound Note (1916), Cyclamen (1916), Struggling Hearts (1916), The Laughing Saskia (1916), Miska the Magnate (1916), St. Peter's Umbrella (1917), The Stork Caliph (1917) (from the novel by Mihály Babits), and Magic (1917). Korda later regarded Harrison and Barrison (1917) as his best film. He also made Faun (1918), Man of Gold (1918), and Mary Ann (1918).

Under the shortlived Hungarian Soviet Republic Korda made Ave Caesar! (1919), White Rose (1919), Yamata (1919) and Neither at Home or Abroad (1919). His final Hungarian film was Number 111 (1919). According to his nephew Michael, Korda's relationship with the Soviet government was not necessarily an antagonistic one, and he described his uncle as "joining mildly in the revolutionary fervor".

In October 1919 Korda was arrested in his room in the Royal Hotel during the White Terror that followed the overthrow of the Communist government. The arrest may have been personally ordered by Miklós Horthy after viewing the leftist films Korda had directed under the Soviet Republic. However, Korda was soon released. He then left Hungary for Austria. He never returned to his country of birth.

=== Films in Vienna ===
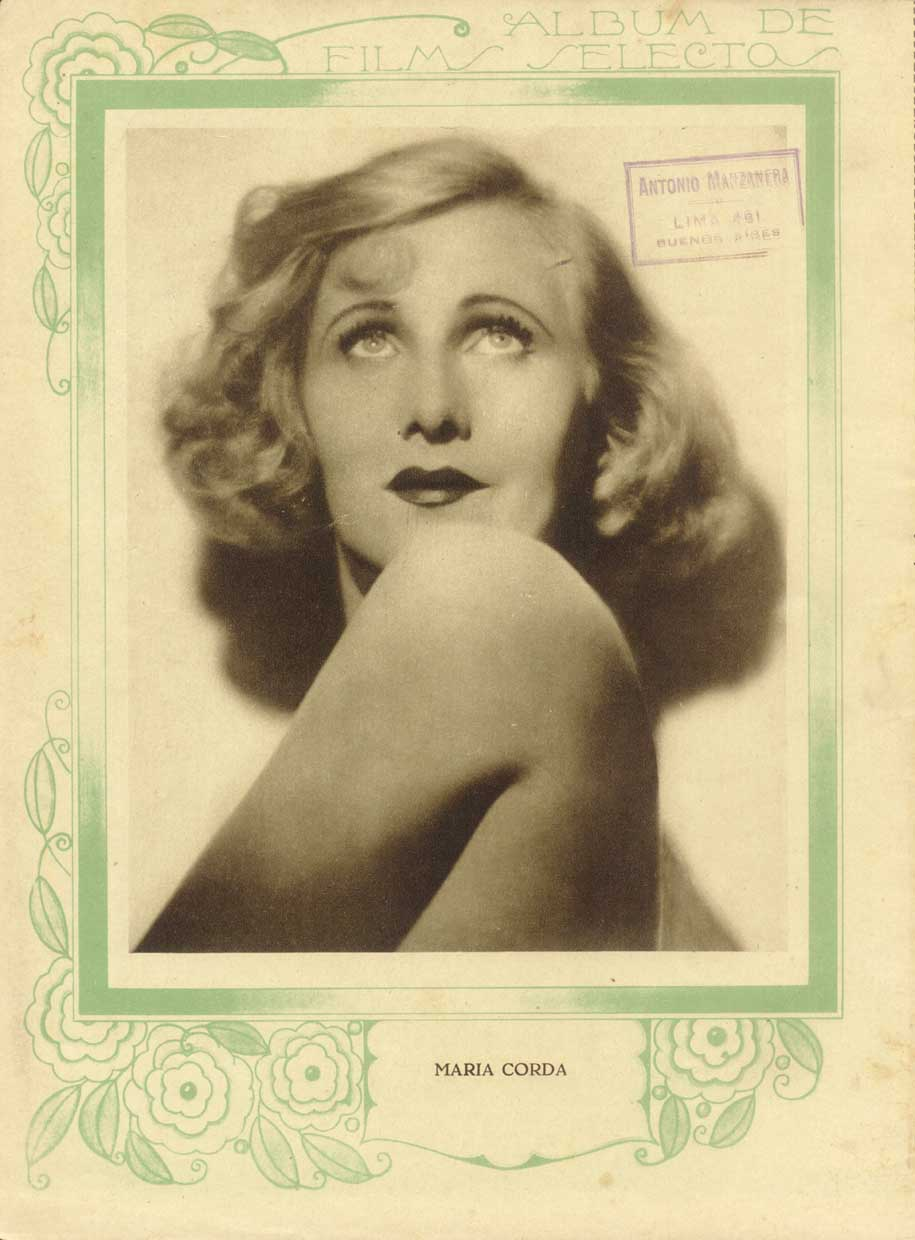
Korda's first wife was the actress María Corda, who starred in many of his silent films in Europe and America.

After leaving Hungary, Korda accepted an invitation from Count Alexander Kolowrat to work for his company Sascha-Film in the Austrian capital Vienna. Korda worked alongside Kolowrat, who had attracted several leading Hungarian and German directors into his employment, on the historical epic The Prince and the Pauper (1920). The film was a major international success and inspired Korda with the idea of making "international films" with global box office appeal.

Korda's next two films, Masters of the Sea (1922) and A Vanished World (1922), were both nautical-set adventures based on Hungarian novels.

By that stage, Korda had grown irritated with Kolowrat's interference with his work and left Sascha to make an independent film, Samson and Delilah (1922), set in the world of opera. The film was made on a lavish scale, with large crowd scenes. The lengthy shooting schedule lasted 160 working days. The film was unsuccessful.

=== Films in Berlin ===
Korda left Vienna and travelled to Germany. He had frequent problems with money, and often had to receive support from friends and business associates, but in Berlin he raised funding for the melodrama The Unknown Tomorrow (1923). With backing from Germany's biggest film company, UFA, Korda returned to Vienna to make Everybody's Woman (1924). While he was there he began work on his next film, the historical Tragedy in the House of Habsburg (1924), which portrayed the Mayerling Incident. It earned back around half of its production costs. He followed this with Dancing Mad (1925), another melodrama.

Korda cast his wife Maria Corda as the female lead in all his German-language films. To a large degree the success of his productions depended on her star power. Korda cast her again in A Modern Dubarry (1927), an update of the life of Madame Du Barry based on an original screenplay by Lajos Bíró. The film may have been intended to showcase Maria Corda's star potential to producers in Hollywood.

Korda made his final German film, Madame Wants No Children (1926), for the Berlin-based subsidiary of the American studio Fox. Although made later, it was released before A Modern Dubarry.

== In Hollywood and France ==
In December 1926 Korda and his wife sailed for the United States on board the steamer Olympic, with a view to Korda taking up a contract with the American studio First National. In Hollywood both struggled to adapt to the studio system. Korda had to wait some time before gaining his first directorial assignment, The Stolen Bride (1927), a Hungarian-themed romance about a peasant's love for a countess. The film starred the American actress Billie Dove rather than Korda's wife.

Following the moderate success of The Stolen Bride Korda worked on the comedy The Private Life of Helen of Troy (1927), replacing the previous director, George Fitzmaurice. The film retells the story of Helen of Troy, parodying the historical epics of the era by transforming the classical characters into everyday people with modern problems. The film was a significant success for Korda, with his wife playing the role of Helen. The film was his most satisfying work in the United States and provided the template for his later success in Britain.

After this film, however, Korda became pigeonholed as a director of female stars and exotic foreign locations. He was generally given similar assignments for the remainder of his first period in Hollywood. His next few films were disappointments as his career lost its momentum: Yellow Lily (1928), Night Watch (1928) both with Dove, and Love and the Devil (1929) with Maria Korda (who now spelled her name with a K). The latter two, though still Silent films, had sound effects and music added to their soundtracks during Hollywood's transition to fully synchronized Sound films.

Korda's next film The Squall (1929), with a young Myrna Loy, was his first talkie and featured a Hungarian setting. Although, like many other directors, Korda had misgivings about the new technology, he quickly adapted to making sound films.

Korda's marriage was strained in Hollywood. The arrival of sound films wrecked his wife's career, as her heavy accent made her unemployable for most American films. Love and the Devil was the last of Korda's films she appeared in, and she made only two more films. She became increasingly resentful of the switch in their relationship, as her career was now over while Korda, who had once relied on her for the success of his films, was relatively flourishing. Their marriage collapsed, and they divorced in 1930.

Korda made two more sound films at First National: Her Private Life (1929) and Lilies of the Field (1930), both of which were remakes of earlier silent films.

Korda grew more frustrated in Hollywood as he came to strongly dislike the studio system. He hoped to save up enough money to return to Europe and begin producing on a large scale there, but his lavish personal spending and the large amounts he lost in the Wall Street crash prevented this. When his producer, Ned Marin, moved from First National to the Fox Film Corporation Korda followed him. Korda's new contract gave him $100,000 a year.

=== Fox ===
His first film for Fox, Women Everywhere (1930), cost slightly more than some of the programmers he had previously directed in the United States. He collaborated with several figures who would contribute to his future success in Britain. Korda was offered a series of scripts, all of which he disliked, before he finally agreed to make The Princess and the Plumber (1930). Korda's reluctance to make the film led to his conflict with studio bosses, which brought to an end his first period in Hollywood.

=== Films in France ===
Korda went to France where he made The Men Around Lucy (1931) for Paramount. He also made Rive gauche (1931).

Korda had a success with Marius (1931) starring Raimu from the play by Marcel Pagnol. He followed it with the Swedish and German versions of Marius, respectively Longing for the Sea (1931), and The Golden Anchor (1932).

== In Britain ==
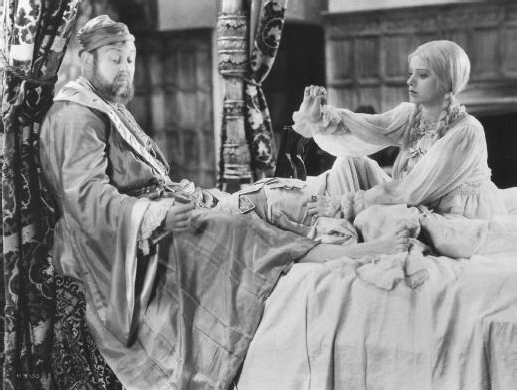
Charles Laughton and Elsa Lanchester in The Private Life of Henry VIII (1933), produced and directed by Korda

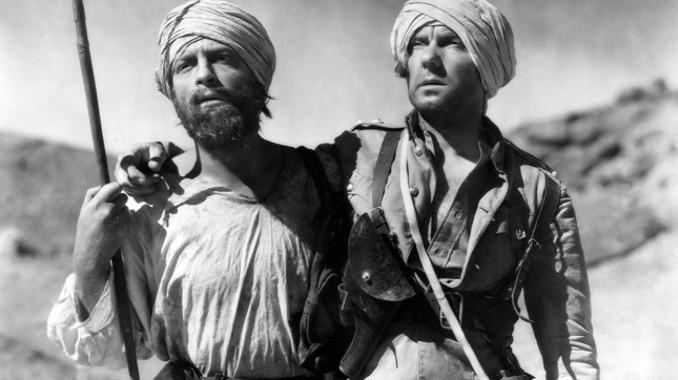
John Clements and Ralph Richardson in Korda's production of The Four Feathers (1939) directed by Zoltan Korda

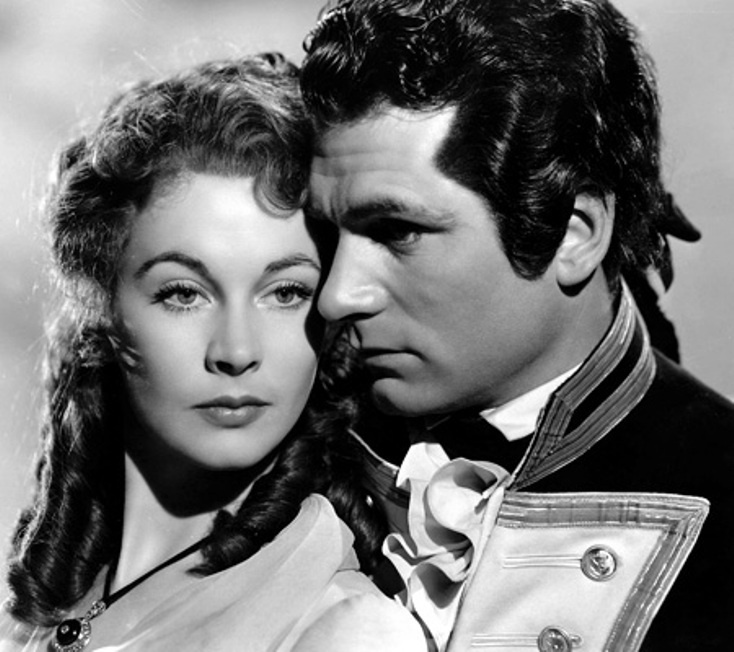
Vivien Leigh and Laurence Olivier in That Hamilton Woman (1941), produced and directed by Korda

Korda relocated to London where he made Service for Ladies (1932) for Paramount. He produced Women Who Play (1932) for them.

=== London Films ===
Korda then decided to form his own company. In 1932 he founded London Films. Its first production was Wedding Rehearsal (1932). He then produced Men of Tomorrow (1932), co-directed by his brother Zoltan Korda, That Night in London (1932) starring Robert Donat, Strange Evidence (1933), Counsel's Opinion (1933), and Cash (1933).

==== The Private Life of Henry VIII ====
Korda had a huge hit with The Private Life of Henry VIII (1933), which he directed. It was nominated for the Academy Award for Best Picture, established Korda internationally and made a star of Charles Laughton.

==== After The Private Life of Henry VIII ====
Korda followed it with The Girl from Maxim's (1933), which he shot in English and French. He tried to repeat the success of Henry with The Private Life of Don Juan (1934) starring Douglas Fairbanks, which he directed, and The Rise of Catherine the Great (1934) which he did not. Neither did as well as Henry.

Korda produced a well-respected short, The Private Life of the Gannets (1934), and enjoyed a big success as producer of The Scarlet Pimpernel (1934). Also popular was Sanders of the River (1935) starring Paul Robeson and directed by his brother, and The Ghost Goes West (1936) starring Donat. His other credits as producer include Moscow Nights (1936) with Laurence Olivier, Men Are Not Gods (1936), and Forget Me Not (1936).

Korda directed Rembrandt (1936) with Laughton, which was a critical rather than a commercial success. Things to Come (1936), directed by William Cameron Menzies, has come to be regarded as a classic. It was written by H. G. Wells and Korda's The Man Who Could Work Miracles (1936) is based on a Wells short story. Korda also commissioned and financed the documentary Conquest of the Air (1936).

=== Denham ===
Korda bought property in Denham, Buckinghamshire, including Hills House, and built film studios on the property. London Film's Denham Film Studios was financed by the Prudential and opened in 1936. On 21 June 1936, Thurston Macauley, London correspondent to The New York Times, filed a story headlined "The Korda Workshop at Denham" describing the facility, located on 165 acres of woodland, field and river scenery suitable for filming, with 28 acres of buildings and a planned total of fifteen 250-foot by 130-foot sound stages (state of the art at the time). It was "not only the most up-to-date of all the world's studios" but a "complete community in itself" from foundry and blacksmith's shops to projection theatres, with "unusually good dressing and bathroom accommodations" and able to easily manage crowds of 500. Macauley pointed to the special construction designed to ensure that even dense fog would not penetrate the buildings and interfere with filming, a serious problem in Britain in the winter months. He concluded: "Hollywood, as well as the rest of the world, will be watching with interest what Korda does at Denham".

Korda was naturalised as a British subject on 28 October 1936. That same year Korda was an important contributor to the Moyne Commission, formed to protect British film production from competition, mainly from the United States. Korda said: "If American interests obtained control of British production companies, they may make British pictures here, but the pictures made would be just as American as those made in Hollywood. We are now on the verge of forming a British school of film-making in this country."

Korda produced Fire Over England (1937) with Olivier and Vivien Leigh. He also attempted a version of I, Claudius with Laughton and Merle Oberon, but it was abandoned with only a few scenes shot.

Korda made Dark Journey (1937) with Conrad Veidt and Leigh, and had a big hit with Elephant Boy (1937) directed by his brother from a Rudyard Kipling story; it made a star of Sabu.

Korda also made some cheaper films: Farewell Again (1938), Storm in a Teacup (1938) with Leigh and Rex Harrison, The Squeaker (1937), Action for Slander (1937), Return of the Scarlet Pimpernel (1937) and Paradise for Two (1937).

Knight Without Armour (1937) with Donat and Marlene Dietrich was an expensive epic that failed to recoup its money. The Divorce of Lady X (1938) was a comedy with Olivier and Merle Oberon.

Korda had a big success with The Drum (1938), directed by Zoltan and starring Sabu. He produced South Riding (1938), The Challenge (1938), The Rebel Son (1939) and Prison Without Bars (1938).

During the Second World War Korda made more propaganda films, including Q Planes (1939), with Olivier, and The Lion Has Wings (1939). Korda had a massive hit with another adventure film directed by Zoltan, The Four Feathers (1939).

By 1939 Michael Powell had been hired as a contract director by Korda on the strength of The Edge of the World (1937). Korda set him to work on some projects such as Burmese Silver that were subsequently cancelled. Nonetheless, Powell was brought in to save a film that was being made as a vehicle for two of Korda's star players, Conrad Veidt and Valerie Hobson. The film was The Spy in Black (1939), where Powell first met Emeric Pressburger. Korda also produced the comedy Over the Moon (1939) and the drama 21 Days (1939).

Korda soon ran into financial difficulties, and management of the Denham complex was merged with Pinewood in 1939, becoming part of the Rank Organisation.

== Sojourn in Hollywood ==
The outbreak of the Second World War in Europe meant that The Thief of Bagdad had to be completed in Hollywood, where Korda was based again for a few years. While he was in the United States he produced and directed That Hamilton Woman (UK title: Lady Hamilton) (1941) with Laurence Olivier and Vivien Leigh, and produced Lydia (1941) with Oberon. He also supervised Jungle Book (1942), a live-action version of Kipling's stories, directed by Zoltán Korda. He also had minor involvement in To Be or Not to Be (1942).

== Return to Britain ==
Korda was appointed a Knight Bachelor, for his contribution to the war effort, in the 1942 Birthday Honours. On 22 September 1942 he was knighted at an investiture ceremony at Buckingham Palace by George VI. He was the first film director to receive the honour.

He returned to Britain in 1943 as production chief of MGM-London films, with a £35 million ten-year programme. The scheme ended after one year, one film and a £1 million loss to MGM. The only film to come out of the deal was Perfect Strangers (1945), directed by Korda, and starring Robert Donat and Deborah Kerr.

=== British Lion Films ===
Via London Films Korda bought a controlling interest in British Lion Films. He produced A Man About the House (1947).

In 1948 London Films received an advance payment of £375,000, the largest single payment received by a British film company, for three films, An Ideal Husband (1947) (which Korda directed), Anna Karenina (1948) and Mine Own Executioner (1948). The company released three other films, Bonnie Prince Charlie (1948), The Winslow Boy (1948) and The Fallen Idol (1948). The Winslow Boy and Fallen Idol were hits. An Ideal Husband and Anna Karenina had some acclaim, but lost money at the box office. Bonnie Prince Charlie was a fiasco. Korda was also badly hurt by the trade war between the British and American film industries in the late 1940s. Korda did recover, in part due to a £3 million loan British Lion received from the National Film Finance Corporation.

In 1948 Korda signed a co-production deal with David O. Selznick. This resulted in The Third Man (1949) which was a success both critically and financially.

London Films made several films with smaller budgets: The Cure for Love (1949), The Happiest Days of Your Life (1950), The Angel with the Trumpet (1950), My Daughter Joy (1950), State Secret (1950), The Wooden Horse (1950), Seven Days to Noon (1951), Lady Godiva Rides Again (1951), The Wonder Kid (1951), and Mr. Denning Drives North (1951). Korda also helped to finance Outcast of the Islands (1952), Home at Seven (1952), Who Goes There! (1952), The Holly and the Ivy (1952), The Ringer (1952), Folly to Be Wise (1953), Twice Upon a Time (1953), The Captain's Paradise (1953), and The Story of Gilbert and Sullivan (1953). Cry, the Beloved Country (1951), directed by Zoltan, was acclaimed. The Sound Barrier (1952) from David Lean was a hit. The Man Between (1953) was an attempt to repeat the success of The Third Man.

Korda then helped to make The Heart of the Matter (1954), Hobson's Choice (1954), The Belles of St. Trinian's (1954), and The Teckman Mystery (1954).

A draft screenplay of what became The Red Shoes was written by Emeric Pressburger in the 1930s for Korda and intended as a vehicle for Merle Oberon, whom Korda later married. The screenplay was bought by Michael Powell and Pressburger, who made it for J. Arthur Rank. During the 1950s Korda reportedly expressed interest in producing a James Bond film based upon Ian Fleming's novel Live and Let Die, but no agreement was ever reached.

=== Final films ===
In 1954 Korda received £5 million from the City Investing Corporation of New York, enabling him to continue producing films until his death. His final films included The Man Who Loved Redheads (1955), Three Cases of Murder (1955), A Kid for Two Farthings (1955), The Deep Blue Sea (1955), Summertime (1955), and Storm Over the Nile (1955) a remake of The Four Feathers. His last films were Laurence Olivier's adaptation of Richard III (1955) and Smiley (1956).

== Personal life ==
Korda was married three times, first to the Hungarian actress María Corda in 1919. They had one son, Peter Vincent Korda, and divorced in 1930. In 1939 he married the film star Merle Oberon. They divorced six years later. He married, lastly, on 8 June 1953, Alexandra Boycun (1928–1966).

=== Death ===
Korda died of a heart attack at the age of 62 at his home in London in 1956. He was cremated at Golders Green Crematorium in London, his ashes finally being interred in February 1959 at Stoke Poges Memorial Gardens in Buckinghamshire.

== Legacy ==
Michael Korda, son of Vincent and thus nephew of Alexander, wrote a roman à clef about Merle Oberon, published after her death. It was entitled Queenie. He also wrote a memoir, Charmed Lives (1979), about his father, his two uncles and the rest of their large extended family.

The Alexander Korda Award for "Outstanding British Film of the Year" is given by the British Academy of Film and Television Arts.

== Filmography ==
The following films were directed by Korda.

- 1914 The Duped Journalist
- 1914 Watchhouse in the Carpathians (as Korda Sándor)
- 1915 Lyon Lea (as Korda Sándor)
- 1915 The Officer's Swordknot (as Korda Sándor)
- 1915 Tutyu and Totyo (as Korda Sándor)
- 1916 A Dolovai nábob leánya
- 1916 Cyclamen
- 1916 Miska the Magnate (as Korda Sándor)
- 1916 Struggling Hearts (uncredited; also co-wrote)
- 1916 Tales of the Typewriter (as Korda Sándor; also wrote)
- 1916 The Grandmother (as Korda Sándor: also wrote)
- 1916 The Laughing Saskia
- 1916 The Man With Two Hearts (as Korda Sándor)
- 1916 The One Million Pound Note (also wrote)
- 1916 White Nights (a.k.a. Fédora; also co-wrote)
- 1917 Magic (as Korda Sándor)
- 1917 St. Peter's Umbrella
- 1917 Harrison és Barrison (also produced)* 1917 The Stork Caliph (as Korda Sándor; also produced)
- 1918 Faun (as Korda Sándor; also produced)
- 1919 Neither at Home or Abroad (as Korda Sándor; also produced)
- 1919 Ave Caesar! (as Korda Sándor)
- 1919 Man of Gold (as Korda Sándor)
- 1918 Mary Ann
- 1919 Number 111 (as Sándor Korda; also produced)
- 1919 White Rose (as Korda Sándor)
- 1919 Yamata (as Korda Sándor; also produced)
- 1920 The Prince and the Pauper
- 1922 A Vanished World
- 1922 Masters of the Sea
- 1922 Samson and Delilah (also produced and co-wrote)
- 1923 The Unknown Tomorrow (also produced and co-wrote)
- 1924 Everybody's Woman (a.k.a. Folly of Doubt)
- 1924 Tragedy in the House of Habsburg (also produced)
- 1925 Dancing Mad (also wrote)
- 1926 Madame Doesn't Want Children
- 1927 A Modern Dubarry
- 1927 The Private Life of Helen of Troy
- 1927 The Stolen Bride
- 1928 Yellow Lily
- 1928 Night Watch
- 1929 Her Private Life
- 1929 Love and the Devil
- 1929 The Squall
- 1930 Lilies of the Field
- 1930 The Princess and the Plumber
- 1930 Women Everywhere
- 1931 Längtan till havet
- 1931 Marius (as Alexandre Korda)
- 1931 Rive Gauche
- 1931 The Men Around Lucy (aka Die Männer um Lucie; also produced)
- 1932 Service for Ladies (also produced)
- 1932 The Golden Anchor
- 1932 Wedding Rehearsal (also produced)
- 1933 La dame de chez Maxim's (also produced)
- 1933 The Girl from Maxim's (also produced)
- 1933 The Private Life of Henry VIII (also produced)
- 1934 The Rise of Catherine the Great (uncredited; also produced)
- 1934 The Private Life of Don Juan (also produced)
- 1936 Rembrandt (also produced)
- 1936 The Man Who Could Work Miracles (director: some scenes – uncredited; also produced)
- 1939 The Lion Has Wings (uncredited; also produced)
- 1941 That Hamilton Woman (also produced)
- 1945 Perfect Strangers (a.k.a. Vacation From Marriage; also produced)
- 1947 An Ideal Husband (also produced)
- 1947 Mine Own Executioner (producer, uncredited co-director)

The following additional films were produced by Alexander Korda but not directed by him:

- 1919 Kutató Sámuel
- 1932 Men of Tomorrow
- 1932 That Night in London
- 1932 Women Who Play
- 1933 Cash
- 1933 Counsel's Opinion
- 1933 Strange Evidence
- 1934 The Private Life of the Gannets (documentary short)
- 1934 The Scarlet Pimpernel (also co-wrote)
- 1935 Moscow Nights (a.k.a. I Stand Condemned; uncredited)
- 1935 Sanders of the River
- 1935 The Ghost Goes West
- 1935 Things Are Looking Up (uncredited)
- 1935 Wharves and Strays
- 1936 Conquest of the Air (updated for a 1940 re-release)
- 1936 Forget Me Not (uncredited)
- 1936 Men Are Not Gods
- 1936 Miss Bracegirdle Does her Duty (short)
- 1936 The Fox Hunt
- 1936 Things to Come
- 1937 Action for Slander (executive producer)
- 1937 Dark Journey (uncredited)
- 1937 Elephant Boy
- 1937 Farewell Again (a.k.a. Troopship; uncredited)
- 1937 Fire Over England (uncredited)
- 1937 I, Claudius (incomplete)
- 1937 Knight Without Armour
- 1937 Paradise for Two
- 1937 Return of the Scarlet Pimpernel (executive producer)
- 1937 Storm in a Teacup (uncredited)
- 1937 The Squeaker (a.k.a. Murder on Diamond Row)
- 1938 Prison Without Bars
- 1938 South Riding
- 1938 The Challenge (uncredited)
- 1938 The Divorce of Lady X (uncredited)
- 1938 The Drum (a.k.a. Drums; executive producer uncredited)
- 1939 The Four Feathers
- 1939 Over the Moon
- 1939 Q Planes (a.k.a. Clouds over Europe)
- 1939 The Spy in Black (a.k.a. U-Boat 29)
- 1940 21 Days (a.k.a. 21 Days Together)
- 1940 The Thief of Bagdad
- 1941 Lydia (a.k.a. Illusions)
- 1941 Old Bill and Son (uncredited)
- 1941 The Great Awakening (a.k.a. New Wine; exec.producer uncredited)
- 1942 Jungle Book
- 1942 To Be or Not to Be (uncredited)
- 1943 The Biter Bit (short)
- 1948 Anna Karenina
- 1948 Bonnie Prince Charlie
- 1949 The Third Man (also co-wrote; uncredited)
- 1950 Gone to Earth (U.S. version The Wild Heart; uncredited)
- 1951 Outcast of the Islands (exec.producer; uncredited)
- 1953 The Man Between (a.k.a. Berlin Story; exec.producer uncredited)
- 1955 A Kid for Two Farthings (uncredited)
- 1955 Richard III (uncredited)
- 1955 Storm Over the Nile (uncredited)
- 1955 The Deep Blue Sea
- 1956 Smiley (uncredited)

== Unmade projects ==
Korda announced a number of projects which were never made, including:

- the life of T. E. Lawrence with Leslie Howard later to be directed by Brian Desmond Hurst.
- the life of Nijinsky (1930s)
- Cyrano de Bergerac with Charles Laughton (1930s–1940s)
- Precious Bane with Robert Donat
- Burmese Silver with Conrad Veidt (1930s)
- the story of Pocahontas starring Merle Oberon (1939)
- adaptation of Manon Lescaut for Merle Oberon
- an adaptation of War and Peace by Leo Tolstoy to star Merle Oberon(1940s)
- Velvet Coat, the life of Robert Louis Stevenson with Oberon and Robert Donat
- an adaptation of Greenmantle by John Buchan
- Lottie Dundass starring Vivien Leigh from the play by Enid Bagnold
- an adaptation of The Wrecker by Robert Louis Stevenson
- Habitation Enforced from the story by Rudyard Kipling
- an adaptation of The King's General by Daphne du Maurier (late 1940s)
- The Promotion of the Admiral from the novel by C. S. Forester starring Ralph Richardson directed by Powell and Pressburger (1940s)
- A Tale of Two Cities with Gregory Peck
- Tess of the d'Urbervilles with Jennifer Jones as Tess
- Around the World in Eighty Days
- The Magic Mountain by Thomas Mann
- Point Counter Point by Aldous Huxley

== Bibliography ==
- Drazin, Charles. Korda: Britain's Only Movie Mogul. Sidgwick & Jackson, 2002. ISBN 978-0283063503
- Kulik, Karol. Alexander Korda: The Man Who Could Work Miracles. Virgin Books, 1990. ISBN 978-0870003356
- Korda, Michael. Another Life: A Memoir of Other People. Random House Publishing Group, 1999. ISBN 978-0679456599
- Korda, Michael. Charmed Lives: A Family Romance. Random House, 1979. ISBN 9780394419541
- Tabori, Paul. Alexander Korda. Oldbourne, 1959.
