= Ladislaus Vajda =

Hungarian screenwriter

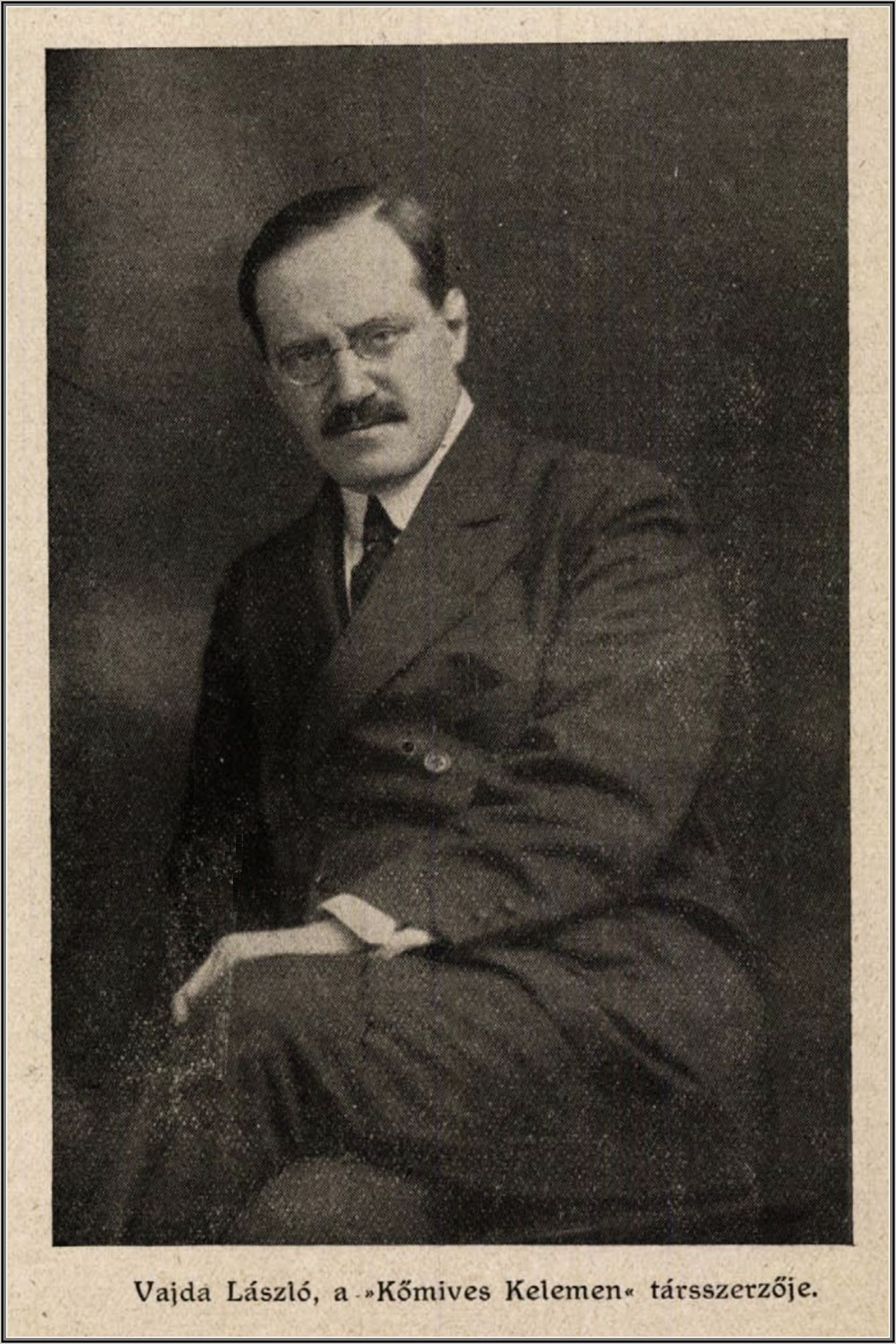
- Born: Lipót Weisz; 19 August 1877; Eger, Austria-Hungary
- Died: 10 March 1933 (aged 55); Berlin, Germany
- Occupation: Screenwriter
- Years active: 1916–1932

Ladislaus Vajda (also László Vajda; born Lipót Weisz; 18 August 1877 – 10 March 1933) was a Hungarian screenwriter. He wrote for 40 films in Hungary, Austria and Germany between 1916 and 1932. He was born in Eger, Northern Hungary and died in Berlin, Germany. He was the father of Hungarian film director Ladislao Vajda.

== Selected filmography ==
- The Village Rogue (1916)
- Utolsó hajnal, Az (1917)
- A vörös Sámson (1917)
- Mary Ann (1918)
- Number 111 (1919)
- Liliom (1919)
- Ave Caesar! (1919)
- Oliver Twist (1919)
- Yamata (1919)
- White Rose (1919)
- Sodom und Gomorrha (1922)
- Der Junge Medardus (1923)
- Die Lawine (1923)
- Die Sklavenkönigin (1924)
- Darling, Count the Cash (1926)
- The Love of Jeanne Ney (1927)
- The Csardas Princess (1927)
- The Dashing Archduke (1927)
- The Devious Path (1928)
- Mariett Dances Today (1928)
- Immorality (1928)
- The Lady in Black (1928)
- The Woman One Longs For (1929)
- His Majesty's Lieutenant (1929)
- Die Büchse der Pandora (1929)
- Land Without Women (1929)
- Police Spy 77 (1930)
- Love and Champagne (1930)
- There Is a Woman Who Never Forgets You (1930)
- The Love Express (1931)
- Venetian Nights (1931)
- L'Atlantide (1932)
