= Gyula Zilahy =

Hungarian actor

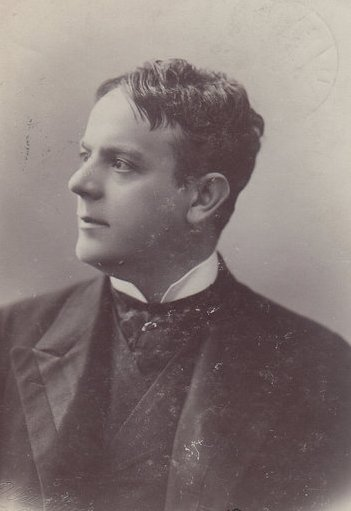
- Gyula Zilahy 1903
- Born: Gyula Balogh; 22 January 1859; Zilah, Austria-Hungary
- Died: 16 May 1938 (aged 79); Budapest, Hungary
- Occupation: Actor

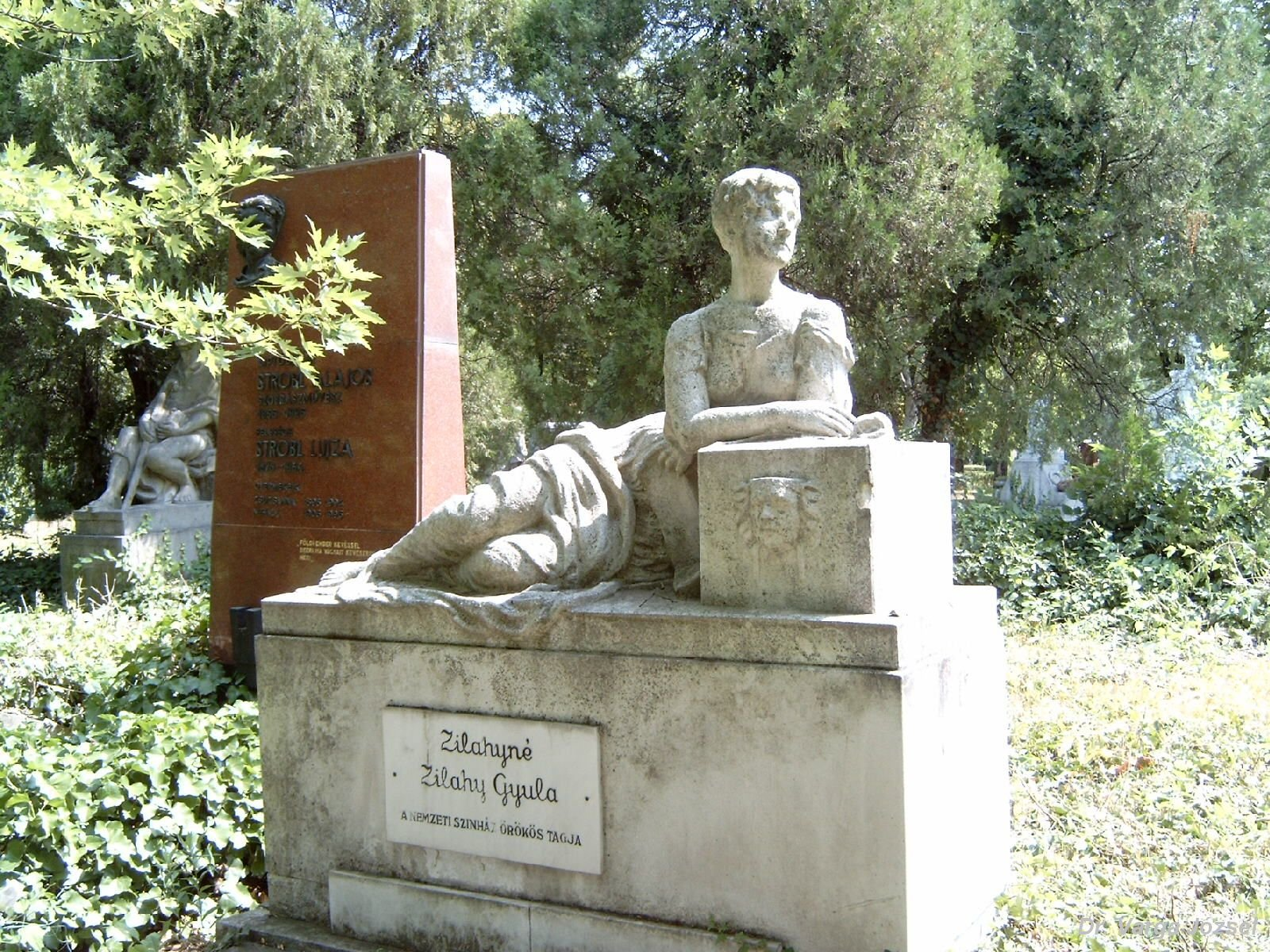
His tomb in Kerepesi Cemetery

Gyula Zilahy (22 January 1859 – 16 May 1938) was a Hungarian stage and film actor. He co-directed several films with Alexander Korda in 1914-1915 including Korda's first film Watchhouse in the Carpathians. Zilahy was born as Gyula Balogh in 1859 in Zilah (today Zalău, Romania) and his career began in 1876. From 1880-84 he worked in Kolozsvár (today Cluj-Napoca, Romania), then in Debrecen (1885–87), and in Szeged (1888).

== Selected filmography ==
Actor

- Pax vobiscum (1920)
- Stars of Eger (1923)
- The Csardas Princess (1927)
- The Blue Idol (1931)
- Wine (1933)

Director

- Watchhouse in the Carpathians (1914)

== Bibliography ==
- Kulik, Karol. Alexander Korda: The Man Who Could Work Miracles. Virgin Books, 1990.
