= Ave Caesar! =

1919 film

- Directed by: Alexander Korda
- Written by: László Vajda
- Starring: Gábor Rajnay; María Corda; Oscar Beregi Sr.
- Production company: Councils' Republic
- Release date: 1919
- Country: Hungary
- Languages: Silent; Hungarian intertitles

Ave Caesar! is a 1919 Hungarian drama film directed by Alexander Korda and starring Oscar Beregi Sr., María Corda and Gábor Rajnay. A debauched Habsburg Prince sends out one of his aides-de-camp to bring him back a gypsy girl. The film was considered as an attack on the aristocracy. It was made by Korda for the state-owned film industry during the Hungarian Soviet Republic. Once the regime fell later that year, Korda was arrested and eventually compelled to leave Hungary as part of the White Terror.

== Cast ==
- Gábor Rajnay
- María Corda
- Oscar Beregi, Sr.

== Bibliography ==
- Kulik, Karol. Alexander Korda: The Man Who Could Work Miracles. Virgin Books, 1990.
