= The Bondman =

The Bondman may refer to:

- The Bondman (play), a 1624 play by Philip Massinger
- The Bondman (novel), an 1890 novel by Hall Caine
- The Bondman (1916 film), an American silent film
- The Bondman (1929 film), a British silent adventure film

== See also ==
- The Bondsman, an American action horror television series
- Bail bondsman
