= William Morris Colles =

William Morris Colles (23 November 1855 – 11 October 1926, Slindon) was an English literary agent, the founder and managing director of The Authors' Syndicate, Ltd.

William Morris Colles was the son of Rev. William Morris Colles, Vicar of Melton Mowbray. He was educated at Oakham School and Emmanuel College, Cambridge, where he graduated B.A. in 1877. He was called to the Bar from the Inner Temple in 1880, married Fanny Elizabeth Bird the same year, and practised on the Midland Circuit.

Colles worked as a leader-writer for the Standard under W. H. Mudford. He founded the Authors' Syndicate in 1890. He was a Member of the Council of the Society of Authors, and of the Copyright Association. The library of UCLA holds correspondence with him from writers including James Barrie, Arnold Bennett, E. F. Benson, Ford Madox Ford, Rider Haggard, and Somerset Maugham. Correspondence held at Columbia University includes letters from A. P. Graves, Thomas Hardy, Fred T. Jane, W. E. Norris, Alfred Ollivant, John Pendleton, William H. Rideing, Herbert Vivian Hall Caine, Peter Kropotkin, Mrs. Belloc Lowndes, Douglas Sladen and Mrs. Humphry Ward.

== Works ==
- Literature and the Pension List: an investigation, 1889
- (with Harold Hardy) Playwright and Copyright in all Nations, 1906
- (with Henry Cresswell) Success in Literature, 1911
