= The Prodigal Son (Caine novel) =

1904 novel by Hall Caine

The Prodigal Son is a best-selling novel by Hall Caine, published in November 1904 by Heinemann and translated into thirteen languages. It is set in a sheep-rearing community in rural Iceland, with scenes in London and the French Riviera. At the same time Caine adapted the novel into a play. The copyright performance was held at the Grand Theatre, Douglas, Isle of Man. American and British productions opened days apart in 1905, at the National Theatre in Washington, D.C., on 28 August, the New Amsterdam Theatre in New York City on 4 September and at the Theatre Royal, Drury Lane, London on 7 September, with George Alexander playing Oscar and Caine's sister Lilian playing Thora. After a long run at Drury Lane it was revived in 1907. In The Prodigal Son Magnus learns on his wedding day that his bride, Thora, is in love with his brother Oscar, a composer. She marries Oscar after Magnus releases her from the engagement. When Thora dies, a distraught Oscar places the only copies of his compositions in her coffin. Later he has her grave opened and his music retrieved. It was filmed in 1923. A.E. Coleby's 18,454 feet, nineteen reel film The Prodigal Son became the longest commercially made British film.
