= Hall Caine =

British novelist and playwright (1853–1931)

Sir Hall Caine CH KBE
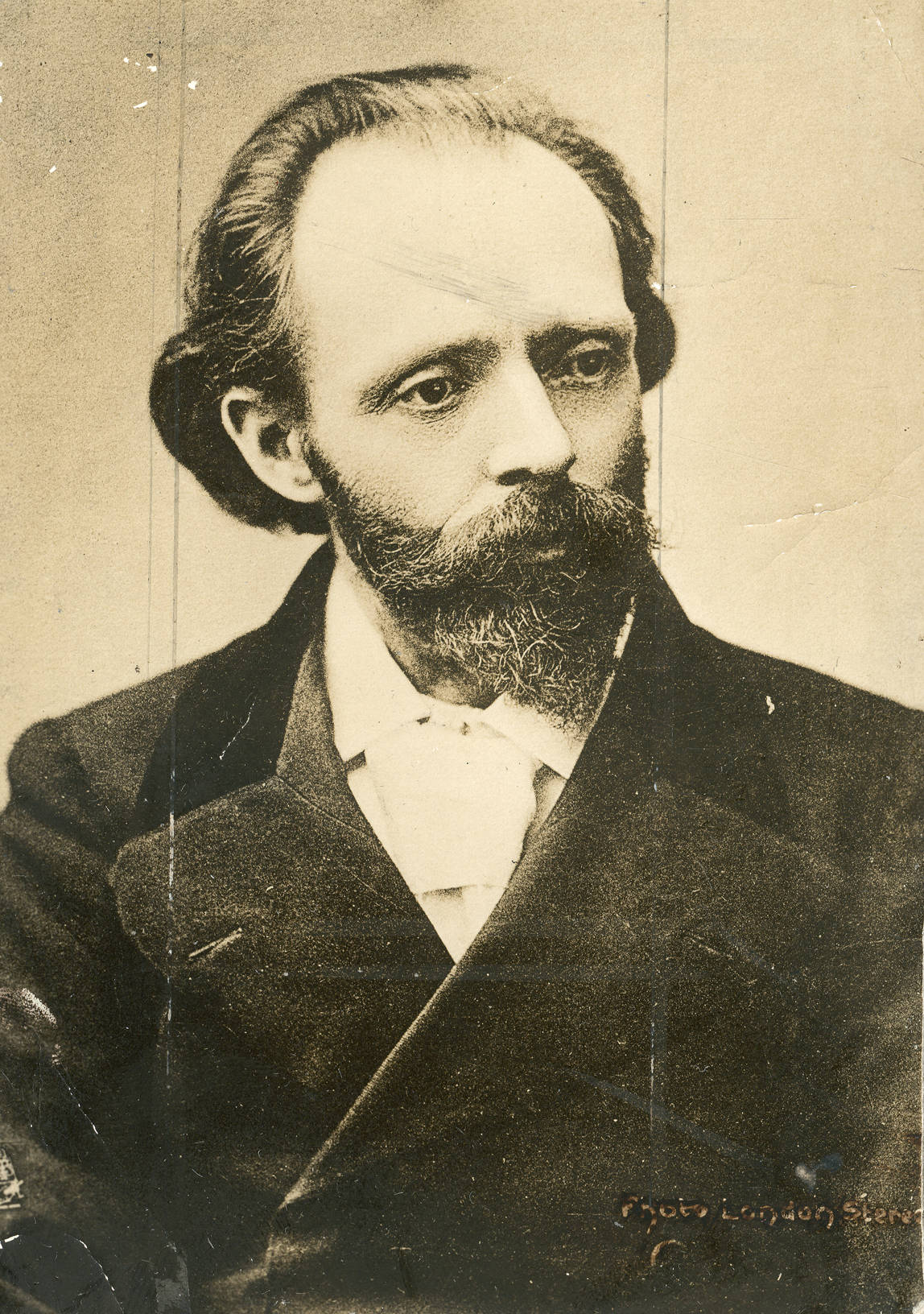
- Born: Thomas Henry Hall Caine; 14 May 1853; Runcorn, Cheshire, England
- Died: 31 August 1931 (aged 78); Greeba Castle, Isle of Man
- Resting place: Maughold, Isle of Man
- Occupation: Writer
- Spouse: Mary Chandler (m. 1886)
- Children: Derwent Hall Caine; Gordon Hall Caine
- Writing career
- Period: Victorian, Edwardian
- Movements: Romanticism, Realism

Signature
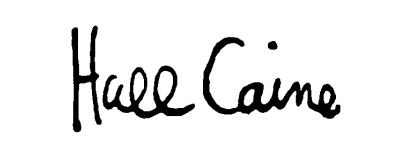

Sir Thomas Henry Hall Caine (14 May 1853 – 31 August 1931), usually known as Hall Caine, was a British novelist, dramatist, short story writer, poet and critic of the late 19th and early 20th century. Caine's popularity during his lifetime was unprecedented. He wrote 15 novels on subjects of adultery, divorce, domestic violence, illegitimacy, infanticide, religious bigotry and women's rights, became an international literary celebrity, and sold a total of ten million books. Caine was the most highly paid novelist of his day. The Eternal City is the first novel to have sold over a million copies worldwide. In addition to his books, Caine is the author of more than a dozen plays and was one of the most commercially successful dramatists of his time; many were West End and Broadway productions. Caine adapted seven of his novels for the stage. He collaborated with leading actors and managers, including Wilson Barrett, Viola Allen, Herbert Beerbohm Tree, Louis Napoleon Parker, Mrs Patrick Campbell, George Alexander, and Arthur Collins. Most of Caine's novels were adapted into silent black and white films. A. E. Coleby's 1923 18,454 feet, nineteen-reel film The Prodigal Son became the longest commercially made British film. Alfred Hitchcock's 1929 film The Manxman, is Hitchcock's last silent film.

Born in Runcorn to a Manx father and Cumbrian mother, Caine was raised in Liverpool. After spending four years in school, Caine was trained as an architectural draughtsman. While growing up he spent childhood holidays with relatives in the Isle of Man. At seventeen he spent a year there as schoolmaster in Maughold. Afterwards he returned to Liverpool and began a career in journalism, becoming a leader-writer on the Liverpool Mercury. As a lecturer and theatre critic he developed a circle of eminent literary friends by whom he was influenced. Caine moved to London at Dante Gabriel Rossetti's suggestion and lived with the poet, acting as secretary and companion during the last years of Rossetti's life. Following the publication of his Recollections of Rossetti in 1882 Caine began his career as a writer spanning four decades.

Caine established his residency in the Isle of Man in 1895, where he sat from 1901 to 1908 in the Manx House of Keys, the lower house of its legislature. Caine was elected President of the Manx National Reform League in 1903 and chair of the Keys' Committee that prepared the 1907 petition for constitutional reform. In 1929 Caine was granted the Freedom of the Borough of Douglas, Isle of Man. Caine visited Russia in 1892 on behalf of the persecuted Jews. In 1895 Caine travelled in the United States and Canada, where he represented the Society of Authors conducting successful negotiations and obtaining important international copyright concessions from the Dominion Parliament.

During the Great War (1914–1918) Caine wrote many patriotic articles and edited King Albert's Book, the proceeds of which went to help Belgian refugees. In 1917, Caine was created an Officer of the Order of Leopold by King Albert I of Belgium. Caine cancelled many literary contracts in America to devote all his time and energy to the British war effort. On the recommendation of the Prime Minister Lloyd George for services as an Allied propagandist in the United States, King George V made him a Knight Commander of the British Empire in 1918 and a Member of the Order of the Companions of Honour in 1922. Aged 78 Caine died in his home at Greeba Castle on the Isle of Man.

== Early life and influences ==
=== Early days ===
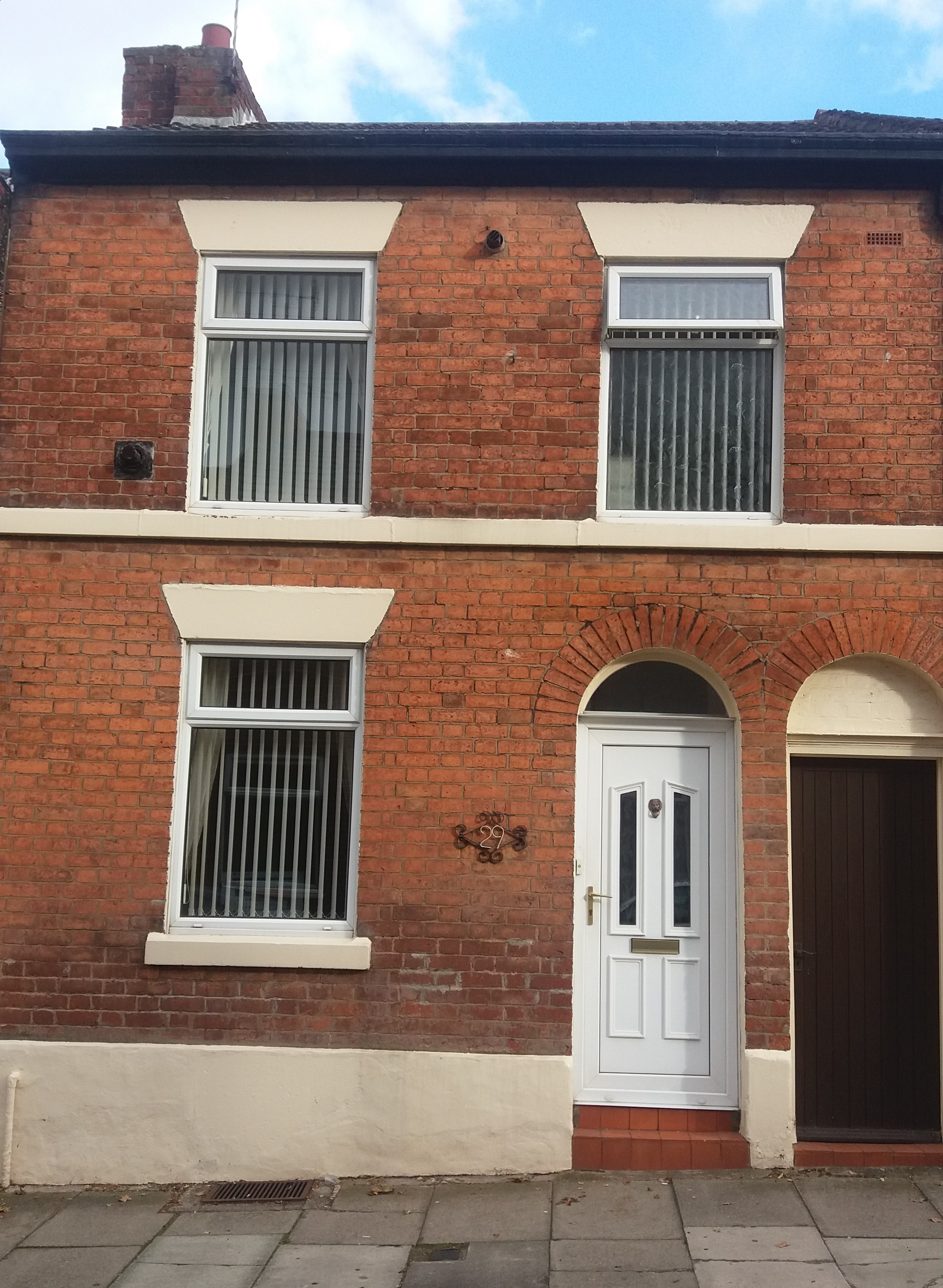
Hall Caine's birthplace, 29 Bridgewater Street, Runcorn

Thomas Henry Hall Caine was born on 14 May 1853 at 29 Bridgewater Street, Runcorn, Cheshire, England, (Note: House numbers were not in use in Bridgewater Street at the time of Caine's birth.) the eldest of six children of John Caine (1825–1904) and his wife Sarah Caine (née Hall, (1828–1912)). Sarah was born in Whitehaven, Cumberland, and descended from an old Quaker family of Ralph Halls, china manufacturer. After living for many years in Cumberland the Hall family moved to Liverpool where Sarah, a seamstress, met and married John. As her husband was a member of the Anglican Church and not a Quaker she lost her connection with the Society of Friends. Throughout her life she retained the Quaker simplicity of life and dress. John Caine, a blacksmith, came from the Isle of Man. In the absence of work he emigrated to Liverpool, where he trained as a shipsmith. At the time of Caine's birth, he was working temporarily in Runcorn docks. Within a few months the family were back in Liverpool, where Caine spent his childhood and youth. They rented rooms at 14 Rhyl Street, Toxteth, convenient for Liverpool Docks and within a small Manx expat community. By 1858 they had moved to number 21. Early in 1862 they moved to 5 Brougham Street where Caine attended Windsor Street Wesleyan School, and in January 1865 the family moved round the corner to 2 Coburg Street. (Note: Gores' Directory Liverpool 1870 lists Brougham Street as being in the vicinity of Sussex Street and renamed Bryan Street.)

During his childhood Caine was occasionally sent to stay with his grandmother, Isabella, and uncle, William, a butcher-farmer, in their thatched cottage at Ballaugh on the Isle of Man. His grandmother nicknamed him 'Hommy-Beg', Manx for 'Little Tommy'. The island has a long history of folklore and superstition, passed from generation to generation. Continuing this tradition Grandmother Caine passed on her knowledge of local myths and legends to her grandson, telling him countless stories of fairies, witches, witch-doctors and the evil eye while they were sat by the fire.

When Caine was nine he lost two of his young sisters within a year. Five year old Sarah developed hydrocephaly after a fever. Fourteen month old Emma died in convulsions brought on by whooping cough she caught from him and his brother John. Caine was to be sent to the Isle of Man to recover from his illness and grief. He was put on a boat to Ramsey by his father, with a label pinned on his coat and assurances that his uncle would meet him. A fierce storm occurred preventing the ferry from reaching land. Caine was rescued by a large rowing boat. He later drew on this experience when writing the scene in The Bondman in which Stephen Orry is cast ashore there. Another sister, Lily Hall Caine, made it to adulthood and became a prominent stage actress. Lily died June 1, 1914.

The Caine family belonged to the Baptist Church in Myrtle Street, Liverpool, presided over by the charismatic Hugh Stowell Brown, a Manxman and brother of poet Thomas Edward Brown. Brown's public lectures and work among the poor made him a household name in Liverpool. Caine participated in the literary and debating society Brown had established. While Caine was very young he became well known and highly regarded by the people of south Liverpool. There he was in great demand as a speaker, having the ability to engage an audience from his first word. Through studying the works of the Lake School of Poets, and the best writers of the eighteenth century, Caine combined this knowledge with his own ideas of perfection, and went on to develop his level of eloquence to oratory.

From the age of ten Caine was educated at Hope Street Unitarian Higher Grade School in Caledonia Street, Liverpool, becoming head boy in his last year there. Prior to this he attended St. James's School and for several years afterwards continued his education attending evening classes at Queen's College, Liverpool Institute. He spent many hours on his own avidly reading books, notably at Liverpool's Free Library. Caine also experienced what he described as the 'scribbling itch' for writing. He produced essays, poems, novels and overview histories with little thought of them being published.

In common with all 19th century towns Liverpool was unsanitary. In 1832 there had been a cholera epidemic. As panic and fear of this new and misunderstood disease spread, eight major riots had broken out on the streets along with several smaller uprisings. In 1849 a second epidemic occurred. When Caine was thirteen the third outbreak of cholera occurred in July 1866. Memories of that time were to stay with him, the deaths, the large volume of funerals and prayer meetings in open spaces that were happening all around him.

=== Apprentice and schoolmaster ===
At fifteen, after leaving school, he was apprenticed to John Murray, an architect and surveyor in Lord Street, Liverpool. Murray was a distant relative of William Ewart Gladstone. On 10 December 1868, the day of the general election when Gladstone was to be elected as Prime Minister, Caine was running to offices in Union Court, belonging to Gladstone's brother, with telegrams announcing the results of the contests all over the country. Caine was breaking the news of great majorities before Gladstone had time to open his telegrams. Caine was to meet Gladstone on another occasion when he was on Gladstone's estate at Seaforth House. The surveyor-in-chief had not appeared one morning and a fifteen year old Caine took his place. Caine had left a lasting impression on Gladstone, as two years later Caine had a letter from Gladstone's brother saying the Prime Minister wished to appoint him steward of the Lancashire Gladstone estates. Caine declined the offer.

Caine's maternal grandparents had lived with the rest of his family while they were growing up in Liverpool. His grandfather, Ralph Hall, died in January 1870, when Caine was seventeen. In the same year of his life Caine was reunited with William Tirebuck, a friend from his school days, when the business of their masters brought them together. United in their interest in literature, they made a juvenile attempt to establish a monthly manuscript magazine, assisted by Tirebuck's sister. Tirebuck was editor, printer, publisher and postman; Caine was principal author. One of the magazine's contributors inherited a small fortune which he invested. About ten thousand copies were printed, followed by a delayed issue no.2. After this venture Tirebuck returned to his position as junior clerk in a merchant's office.

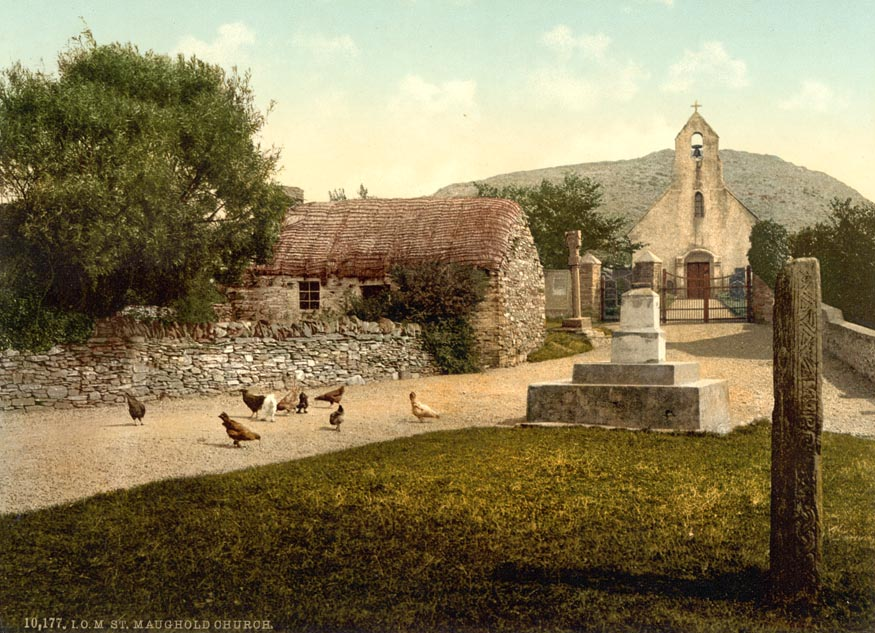
The centre of Maughold Village, Isle of Man

Suffering from what he described as "the first hint of one of the nervous attacks which even then beset me", and later as "the first serious manifestation of the nervous attacks which have pursued me through my life", Caine quit his job with Murray and, arriving unannounced, went to live with his uncle and aunt, James and Catherine Teare in Maughold on the Isle of Man.

Teare was the local schoolmaster, and as Caine was to learn, ill with tuberculosis. Caine became his assistant teaching in the schoolhouse. Finding their accommodation in part of the schoolhouse was crowded Caine camped in a nearby tholtan, a half-ruined cottage. Using his stonemason skills, taught to him by his grandfather Hall, he restored and lived in the cottage. On the stone lintel above the door he carved the name Phoenix Cottage and the date 8 January 1871.

Encouraged by Teare, after he had written to reassure Caine's parents that he might one day be able to make a living as a writer, Caine wrote anonymous articles for a local newspaper on a wide range of religious and economic questions.

John Ruskin had started his Guild of St George and began expressing his ideas in his new monthly series, Fors Clavigera, written as a result of his feelings regarding the acute poverty and misery in Great Britain at the time. Rumours of undergraduates, following Ruskin's ideas, digging the ground outside Oxford, reached Caine. He was inspired by Ruskin to begin writing denunciations of the social system and of the accepted interpretation of the Christian faith. Caine was to become 'an eager pupil and admirer' of Ruskin. He later became a frequent visitor to Ruskin's Coniston home, Brantwood.

Following the death of James Teare in December 1871, Caine carved a headstone for the grave. After officially taking his place as schoolmaster, he also performed the extra unpaid services his uncle had provided, "such as the making of wills for farmers round about, the drafting of agreement and leases, the writing of messages to banks protesting against crushing interest, and occasionally the inditing of love letters for young farm hands to their girls in service on farms that were far away". Later he drew on this material to use in his writing. In March 1872, he had a letter from Murray his master, the architect, which said "Why are you wasting your life over there? Come back to your proper work at once." Caine was on his way back to Liverpool within a week.

=== Journalist and theatre critic ===
In April 1872, at the age of eighteen, Caine was back home in Liverpool where he set about applying his knowledge, gained working in the drawing office, into articles on architectural subjects, and subsequently published in The Builder and The Building News. These were Caine's first works published for a national audience. The articles caught Ruskin's attention and he wrote words of encouragement to Caine.

Seeking to be published, he offered his services, without payment, as a theatre critic to a number of Liverpool newspapers, which were accepted. He used the pseudonym 'Julian'. Before Henry Irving played Hamlet, his intention to play the part differently to any other actor was known to Caine and he contributed many articles on the subject to various papers. The study of Shakespeare and the Bible from his earliest years were his 'chief mental food'. As he had become more absorbed by literary studies he was not content with reading Shakespeare's plays, so he was reading all of the most notable playwrights of the Elizabethan age and "he began to make acquaintance with the dramatists". In the summer of 1872 Caine wrote his first play. The Charter was an adaptation of Charles Kingsley's novel Alton Locke, but as an unknown writer he could not get it staged. "Partly from the failure of faith in myself as a draughtsman and partly from a desire to be moving on" Caine left his employment with Murray and joined the office of Richard Owen and later Wainwright and Son. For a few years he was general assistant to a builder, James Bromley who became his friend.

Together with William Tirebuck and George Rose, his friends from school days, Caine applied himself to establishing Liverpool branches of the Shakespeare Society, and the Society for the Protection of Ancient Buildings. They called their own organisation Notes and Queries Society and held their meetings at the prominent Royal Institution, Colquitt Street. Caine was president of the society and their meetings were reported in the Liverpool newspapers. The 'Notes' were often provided by John Ruskin, William Morris and Dante Gabriel Rossetti.

On 16 October 1874 Henry Irving wrote to Caine agreeing to his request to use his portrait in Stray Leaves a new monthly magazine he was launching. In his capacity as critic of the Liverpool Town Crier, Caine attended the first night of Hamlet at the Lyceum Theatre, London, on 31 October 1874, with Irving in the title role. Caine was enthralled by Irving's performance and after his enthusiastic review was published in the newspaper, he was asked to reprint it as a broad-sheet pamphlet, as it was of such a high quality.

Caine's first short story Max Wieland was published in the Liverpool Critic around 1874. A year later Caine became dramatic critic of the Spectator. Caine's long narrative poem, Geraldine, appeared in print in March 1876. It was a completion of Coleridge's unfinished poem Christabel.

The Caine family had moved into a larger house in 1873, at 59 South Chester Street, Toxteth, where Caine shared a bedroom with his younger brother John, a shipping clerk. John contracted tuberculosis which he passed to his brother. By 1875 Caine had permanent lodgings in New Brighton, spending weekends there "for the sake of his health". Caine became increasingly unwell from the beginning of January 1877. In April the same year John, died from tuberculosis, aged 21. Dangerously ill, Caine was terrified of suffering the same fate. He recovered, but the disease left him with permanent lung damage, and throughout his life he had attacks of bronchitis. In his 1913 novel The Woman Thou Gavest Me, he describes Mary O’Neil dying of tuberculosis.

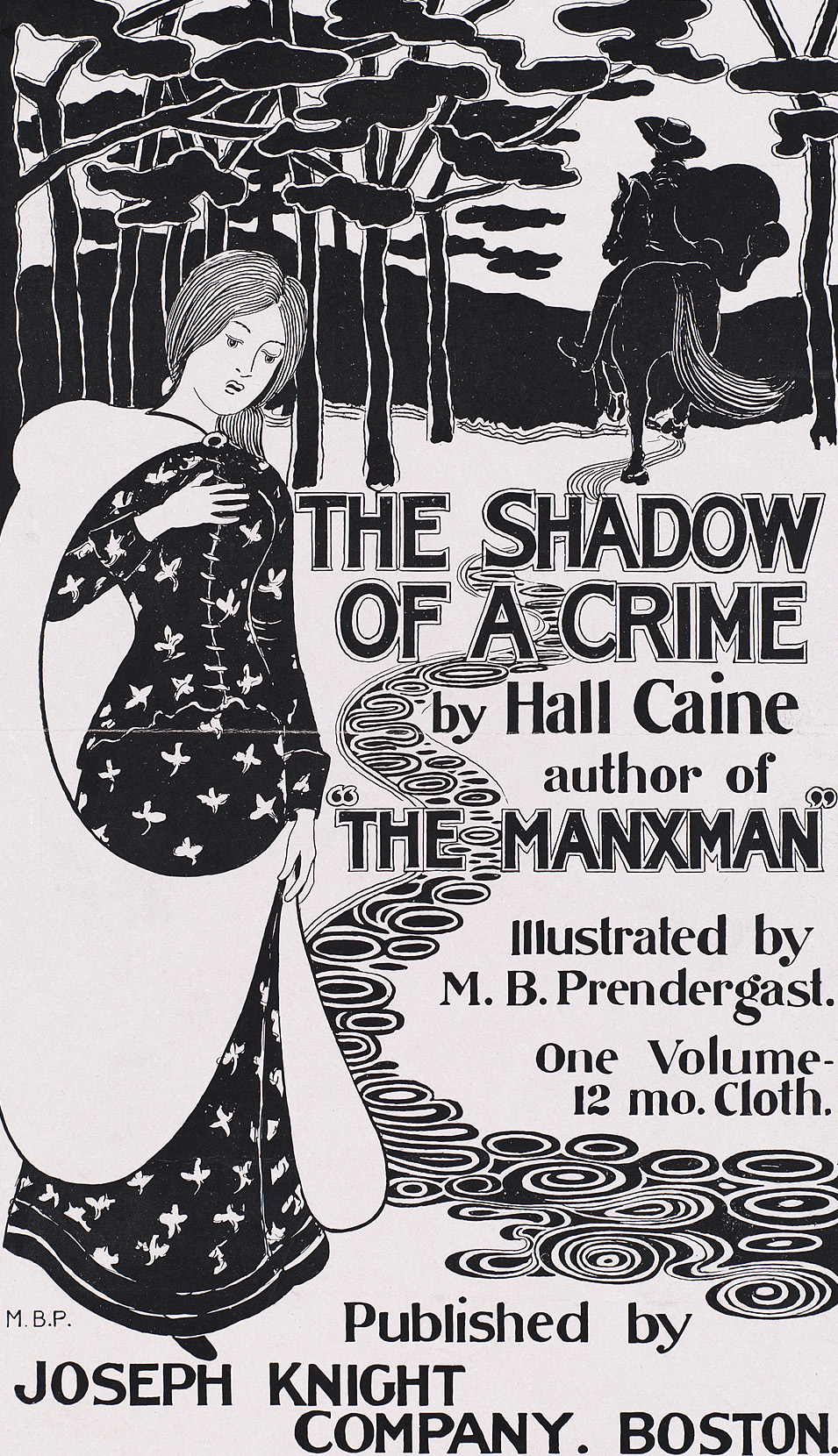
1895 Poster advertising The Shadow of a Crime.

Manchester Corporation had covertly been buying land for building the proposed Thirlmere Aqueduct, intended to supply water to the city. When discovered, it outraged the local community. Thirlmere, close to the centre of the Lake District, in an area, not only celebrated in the poetry of early conservationist William Wordsworth and fellow Lake poets, but also used as a summer residence by writers, amongst others. In opposition to damming the lake at Thirlmere to form a reservoir, the first environmental group, Thirlmere Defence Association was formed in 1877. It was supported by the national press, Wordsworth's son and John Ruskin. Caine, incensed at what he perceived as a threat to his beloved Cumbria, joined the movement, initiating a Parliamentary petition. Thirlmere was to be the setting for his novel The Shadow of a Crime.

In response to his lecture The Supernatural in Shakespeare, given in July 1878, in a meeting chaired by Professor Edward Dowden, Matthew Arnold wrote him a long letter of praise. He was also praised by Keats's biographer, Lord Houghton. The lecture appeared in Colburn's New Monthly Magazine in August 1879,

Irving presided at a meeting of the Liverpool Notes and Queries Society in September 1878. At Irving's invitation, he travelled to London to attend Irving's first night at the Lyceum Theatre under his own management, presenting his new production of Hamlet with Ellen Terry as Ophelia on 30 December. It was at this time that Caine was introduced to Irving's business manager, Bram Stoker, who was to become one of his closest friends. Stoker later dedicated his novel Dracula to Caine, under the nickname 'Hommy-Beg'.

In 1879 Caine edited a booklet of the papers presented to the Notes and Queries Society by William Morris, Samuel Huggins and John J. Stevenson on the progress of public and professional thought on the treatment of ancient buildings which was described as "'well worth reading". At the 1879 Social Science Congress held in Manchester Town Hall, Caine read his paper A New Phase of the Question of Architectural Restoration. He spoke of the Society for the Protection of Ancient Buildings, its purpose, actions and achievements. Caine had joined the society the previous year and remained a member for the rest of his life. One of the society's founders was William Morris.

=== Friendship with Francis Tumblety ===
As a young man of 21 Caine encountered the self-proclaimed 'Great American Doctor', Francis Tumblety, aged 43, after he set up at 177 Duke Street, Liverpool, offering herbal cure-all elixirs and Patent medicines to the public, which he claimed were secrets of the American Indians. Tumblety posed at various times in his life as a surgeon, an officer in the federal army, and a gentleman. He always followed his name with "M.D." and used the title 'Doctor', without the supporting qualifications, for which he was fined in Saint John, New Brunswick in 1860.

From September 1874, Tumblety was announcing his arrival in Liverpool by advertising in local newspapers, later including testimonials. Following the death of Edward Hanratty in January 1875, the same night he took a spoon of medicine supplied by Tumblety, and action taken by William Carroll to sue Tumblety for £200 after allegedly publishing a false testimonial, Tumblety fled to London. Many newspapers reported the stories and in the wake of this adverse publicity, Tumblety recruited Caine to edit his biography. Late January Tumblety wrote requesting Caine to obtain a quote for printing ten thousand copies in Liverpool, telling of being betrayed by a supposed friend, and praising Caine for his genuine friendship. After Caine forwarded his letters, he wrote on 1 February discussing the upcoming biography and enclosed a letter supposedly originating from the Isle of Wight, by Napoleon III. The following day the first advert for the upcoming pamphlet appeared in the Liverpool Mercury. Tumblety changed lodgings, initially missing an urgent telegram from Caine indicating there was a problem with the publication. His response was to tell Caine to stop until he saw the proofs. Tumblety offered to pay for Caine to visit him in London to discuss the pamphlet, his letter dated 16 February indicating Caine had taken up the offer. He told a friend that his visit to Tumblety was "arduous". A spate of correspondence relating to the publication ensued, Tumblety supplying Caine with names of notable people to be included in the pamphlet, along with money for printing and advertising. Tumblety later wrote of disputes with the printer. Claiming to be too ill to send money, he sent Caine a printer's bill for payment. Tumblety had hired an assistant who read the proofs to him. The pamphlet entitled Passages from the Life of Dr Francis Tumblety, and the fourth of Tumblety's biographies, was published in March 1875.

Tumblety wrote to Caine in April 1875 that he was contemplating manufacturing his pills in London, and required a partner to share the profits, telling Caine to approach Liverpool chemists as proposed outlets. Caine had declined a further invitation to London, but Tumblety persisted with his invites to join him in London, later made by telegram, additionally inviting him on a planned trip to America. Around the time Alfred Thomas Heap was hanged in Kirkdale Gaol, Liverpool, for an abortion-related death, Tumblety, who had been arrested in 1857 for selling abortion drugs, disappeared. Caine made enquiries as to his whereabouts. Briefly Tumblety set up offices in Union Passage, Birmingham. His correspondence turned menacing, demanding money from Caine. Tumblety left London for New York City in August 1876. Failing to entice Caine to join him, he followed months later with a pleading letter from San Francisco, after which there is no record of any further contact.

=== Rossetti years ===
Caine delivered a series of three lectures on Dante Gabriel Rossetti's work and the Pre-Raphaelite Brotherhood movement at Liverpool Library between November 1878 and March 1879. The January lecture entitled The Poetry of Dante Rossetti was printed in Colburn's New Monthly Magazine in July 1879. Caine sent a copy of the magazine to the poet Rossetti, who by that time had become a virtual recluse and was "ravaged by years of addiction to chloral and too much whisky".

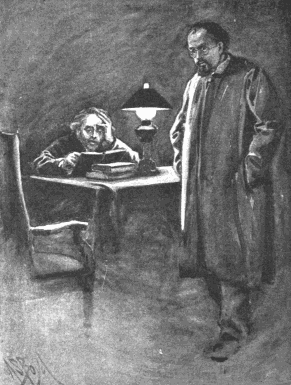
Dante Gabriel Rossetti walking to and fro while Hall Caine reads his lectures out loud during their stay in a farmhouse at St John's in the Vale, Cumbria.

Rossetti wrote his first letter to Caine on 29 July 1879. This letter was the first of nearly two hundred in quick succession. Around this time Caine's father was badly injured in an accident at work and Caine took responsibility for supporting his parents and siblings. Early in 1880 he wrote Stones Crying Out, a short book on the restoration of old buildings. Two of the chapters were papers he had read at the Social Science Congress and Liverpool Library. Rossetti introduced Caine to Ford Madox Brown, who was at the time working on The Manchester Murals. Following his visit to write an article on Brown's frescoes in July 1880 they became friends. On a later visit Caine accepted Brown's invitation to sit for one of the figures while he was working on The Expulsion of the Danes from Manchester, the third fresco. On another visit he modelled for Crabtree watching the Transit of Venus A.D. 1639, the fifth fresco to be painted. Caine and Rossetti eventually met in September 1880 when Caine visited Rossetti in his home at 16 Cheyne Walk, Chelsea, London, where he lived "in shabby splendour".

The strain of overworking was affecting Caine's health and in 1881, deciding to focus on his literary career, he left his job at Bromley & Son and went to St John's in the Vale, Cumbria. Before long Rossetti wrote that he too was ill and asked Caine to go to London planning to return to Cumbria with him. By the time Caine arrived in London Rossetti had changed his mind and instead Caine became Rossetti's housemate. Early in September, persuaded by friends and family Rossetti spent a month with Caine at St John's in the Vale, accompanied by Fanny Cornforth. Whilst there, Caine recited a local myth to Rossetti. The myth was to become the inspiration for his first novel The Shadow of a Crime. He was also delivering weekly lectures in Liverpool.

Caine negotiated the acquisition of Rossetti's largest painting Dante's Dream of the Death of Beatrice by Liverpool's Walker Art Gallery, representing the painter at its installation in November 1881. In January 1882 Caine's anthology Sonnets of Three Centuries was published.

After Rossetti "had an attack of paralysis on one side", his medical adviser, Mr John Marshall, recommended a change of air. Architect John Seddon offered Rossetti the use of Westcliffe Bungalow at Birchington, Kent. Caine eventually persuaded Rossetti to make the trip to Birchington, and they both arrived on 4 February 1882, accompanied by Caine's sister and Rossetti's nurse. Caine stayed with Rossetti until Rossetti's death on Easter Sunday, 1882.

== Start of literary career ==
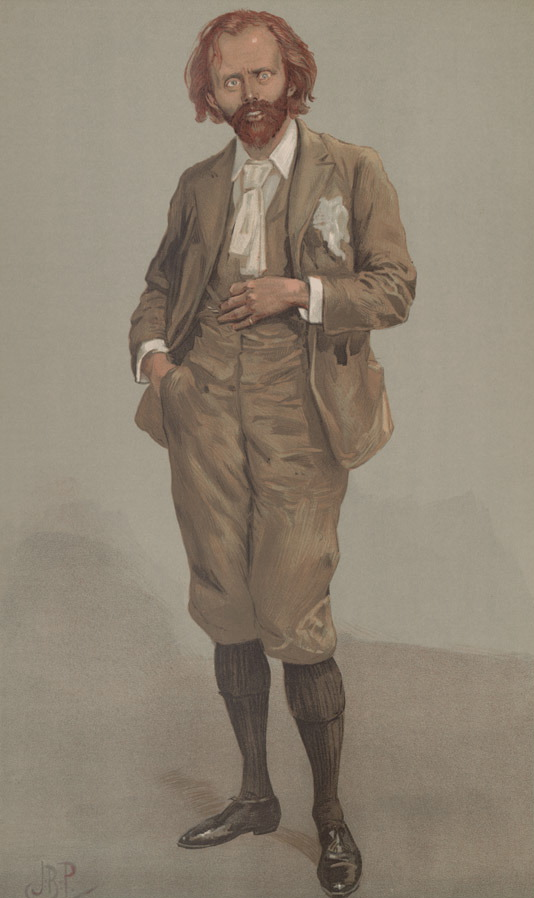
The Manxman Caine as caricatured in Vanity Fair, July 1896

From 1882 Caine was employed as a leader-writer on the Liverpool Mercury and was given free rein as to the subject and number of articles he wrote. This gave him the opportunity to attend and review numerous first nights at the London theatres. One review angered actor-playwright Wilson Barrett and he demanded a meeting with Caine. Barrett concluding his complaint added "I think you could write a play, and if someday you should hit on a subject suitable to me, I shall be glad if you will let me hear of it".

Caine's Cobwebs of Criticism: A Review of the First Reviewers of the Lake, Satanic and Cockney Schools was published in 1883. It began as a series of Liverpool lectures exposing unjustified reviews of poets Byron, Coleridge, Hunt, Keats, Shelley, Southey and Wordsworth that were written during their lifetimes

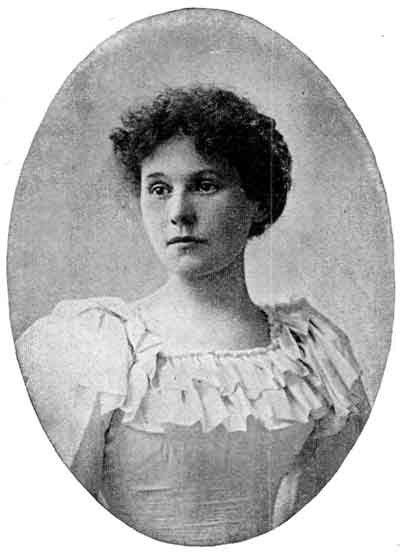
Mary Hall Caine by Alfred Ellis

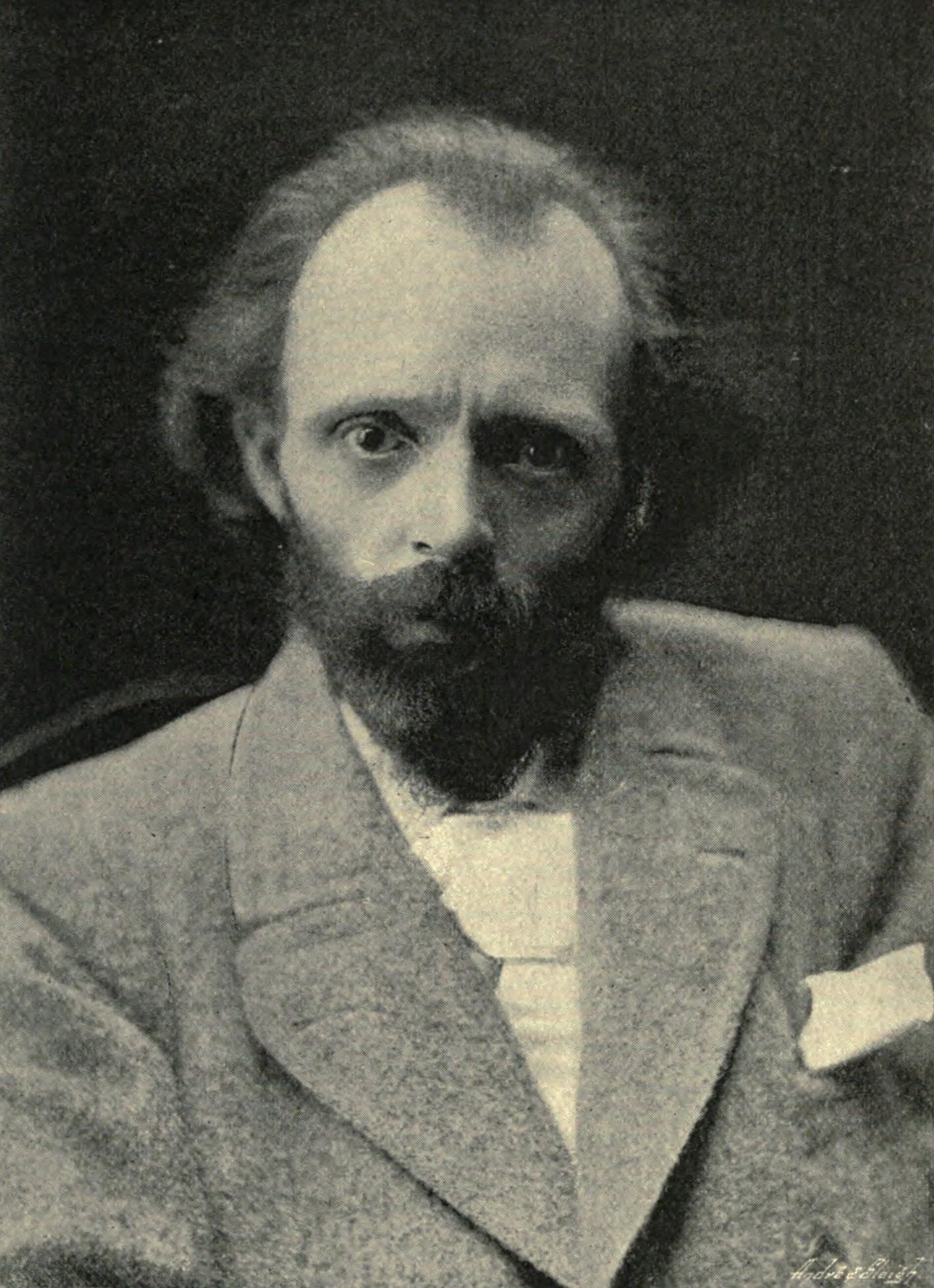
Hall Caine, by H. S. Mendelssohn

Returning to London after Rossetti's death, Caine moved into 18 Clement's Inn in July 1882, sharing rooms with his academic friend Eric Robertson, where they often hosted intellectual gatherings. They frequently had their evening meals delivered from a nearby coffee shop in Clare Market, which were brought by two young women; one was the 19-year-old Mary Chandler who was to eventually marry Caine. (Note: Vivien Allen’s biography on Hall Caine states that Mary was 13 when she met Caine, 15 when Ralph was born and 17 when she married, consistent with the (estimated) birth date on her grave, 25 May 1869. Mary Chandler’s birth and early life has been determined through research on ancestry.com, through parish, census and marriage records. She was born 23 April 1863, 19 when she met Caine in 1882, 21 when Ralph was born and 23 when she married.) Mary was the fourth of seven children. She was born 23 April 1863, the daughter of Mary and William Chandler, a General Dealer, and grew up in Bethnal Green. William died in 1873 and her mother married John Ward, a Poulterer, in Shoreditch. The family moved to the City of London where John became a Hawker. Months after Mary had first met Caine, John Ward and the other girl's father confronted Caine and Robertson demanding marriage, claiming the young women had been 'ruined'. According to Caine's biographer, nothing more than 'a bit of flirting' had taken place. Refusing to marry, Caine went to Liverpool to deliver lectures, returning to London in early December 1882. Upon Caine's return Mary's stepfather abandoned her at Clement's Inn. Mary went to Sevenoaks for six months to be educated, financed by Caine; she had received little education as a child.

At the end of October 1883, with enough money to last about four months Caine, accompanied by Mary, went to the Isle of Wight where he rented Vectis Cottage, close to the cliffs and sea near Sandown. There he set to work writing his first novel The Shadow of a Crime. Inspired by his Cumbrian heritage the plot was based on one of the oldest legends of the Lake District, told to him by his grandfather, Ralph Hall. In it he uses the Cumbrian dialect that he had listened to and spoke during his childhood. When he had finished he moved back to London. Living in rooms on the fourth floor of New Court, in Lincoln's Inn, he re-wrote it. After running as a serial in the Liverpool Weekly Mercury, Caine's novel was published in February 1885, by Chatto & Windus, and serialised in several newspapers. His reputation was immediately established, along with a foremost place among the novelists of the day. He was later invited to write the story of writing The Shadow of a Crime, which after its appearance in the Idler was published in 1894 in My First Book. After the publication of Caine's first novel, Mary created a series of scrapbooks containing items relating to his public life.

Mary and Caine's son, Ralph Hall, was born in their rented house Yarra, Worseley Road, Hampstead on 15 August 1884. The following month they moved to live in Aberleigh Lodge, Red House Lane, Bexleyheath, next door to William Morris' Red House, where they remained until 1889.

Caine had many friends in London's elite artistic and intellectual circles. As a friend of Stoker and Irving for many years he became a regular at Irving's Beefsteak Room gatherings at the Lyceum, presided over by Ellen Terry, where he became acquainted with the Prince of Wales (later Edward VII). At one supper, where the only other guest was composer Alexander Mackenzie, Caine breaking the rules, brought his son Ralph with him.

In order to make essential money and acquire exposure in America, disregarding the advice of his friends, Caine's short novel She's All The World To Me, was published in New York, in 1885 by Harper & Brothers. She's All The World To Me was the first of his novels to be set on the Isle of Man. Under American copyright laws the book's copyright was forfeited to Harper and Brothers, a situation unforeseen by Caine, he was incensed. Caine recycled much of the material from the book in his later works, particularly in The Deemster. She's All The World To Me was serialised in the Liverpool Weekly Mercury between 21 March and 4 April 1885 immediately following The Shadow of a Crime.

Set in the contrasting locations of the Vale of Newlands in the Lake District and Victorian London, A Son of Hagar, Caine's third novel was written in 1885–86 and published in 1886 by Chatto and Windus. Begun in collaboration with Robert Buchanan, their partnership was discontinued early on after discovering they did not work well together. Dealing with the theme of illegitimacy, Caine has written a story close to his own life. The opening scene is set in Victorian London police court where a girl is charged with attempted suicide after she and her illegitimate baby had been dragged from the Thames, a scene he could well have witnessed while working as reporter. Later Caine attempted to suppress A Son of Hagar from both of the Collected Editions of his novels. Licensed to Thomas Nelson in 1907 by Chatto, the novel was printed in the Nelson Library.

In 1886 Mary and Caine travelled to Scotland to watch Irving when he was on tour in Edinburgh where they covertly married on 3 September under Scottish law by declaration before witnesses. Mary became a devoted wife, reading all his work, advising and criticising when appropriate and was his first secretary.

Two of Caine's sonnets, Where Lies the Land! and After Sunset, were included in William Sharp's 1886 anthology Sonnets of this Century. Publisher Walter Scott engaged Eric Robertson, Caine's former roommate, to edit a series entitled Great Writers. Aware of the study Caine had already made of Coleridge, Robertson asked Caine to contribute a brief biography of the poet to the series. In three weeks Caine wrote Life of Coleridge, published in 1887. November the same year The Deemster was published in three volumes by Chatto & Windus. It was set in 18th century Isle of Man, where the title of Deemster is given to the Island's judges. The plot includes the story of a fatal fight, with the body being taken out to sea only to float back to land the next day. It ran to more than fifty English editions and was translated into every major European language. Caine sent a copy of the novel to Wilson Barrett as he suited the main character, then set to work adapting his novel into a stage version called Ben-my-Chree, Manx for 'Girl of my Heart'. Irving, after reading the book, saw potential in it, himself playing the Bishop. The play opened at the Princess Theatre on 17 May 1888 and ran for a profitable nine weeks. It was a popular staple on Barratt's provincial and international tours for several years afterwards and was successfully produced by others to whom he licensed the rights. An appreciative Caine acknowledged Barratt's substantial contribution by naming him co-writer.

== Middle years ==
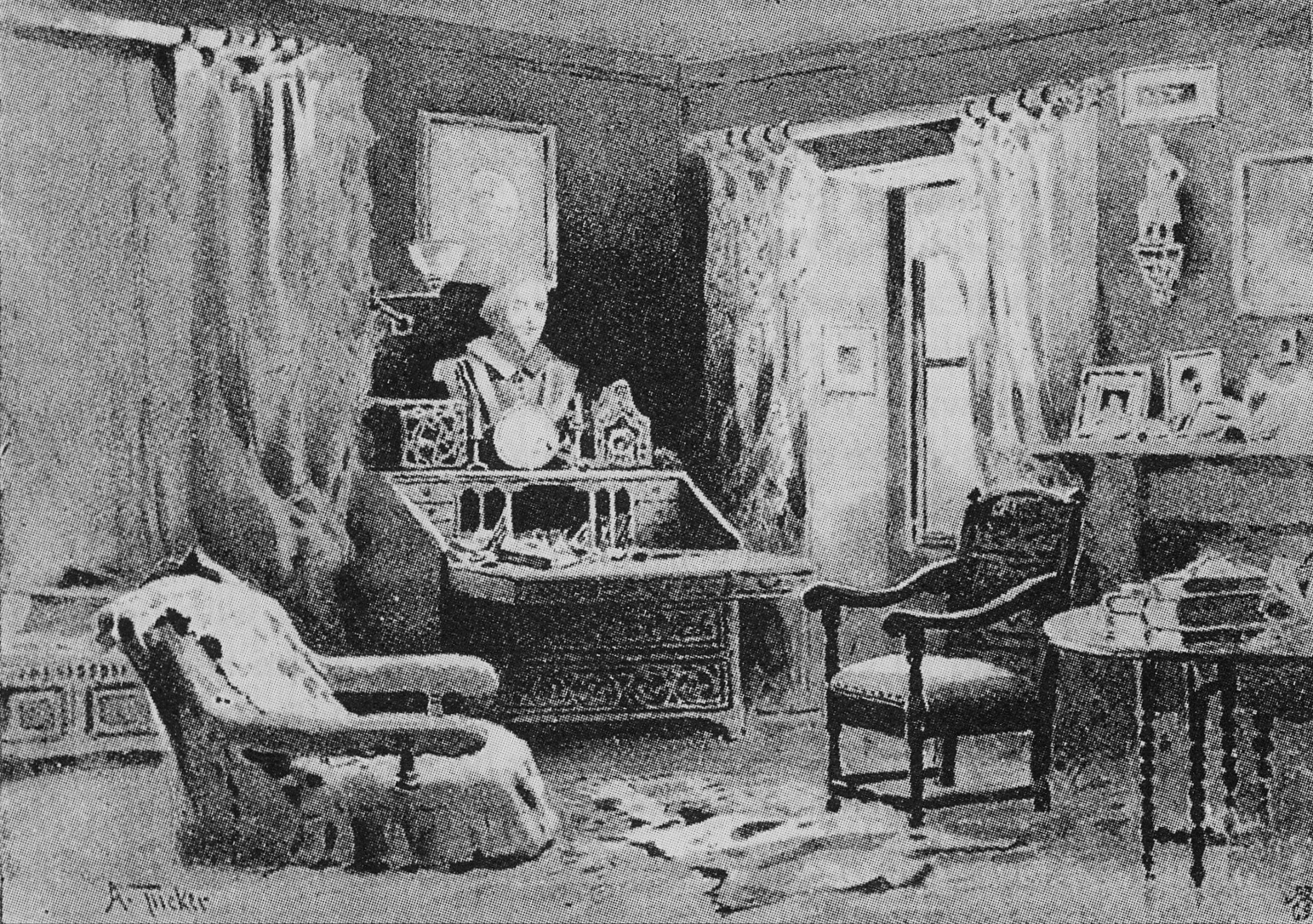
Caine's study at Hawthorns, 1889, drawn by A. Tucker. The bust of Shakespeare on the desk originally belonged to Rossetti. The chair, designed and made for Caine by William Morris, is on the left. On the right, a carved oak chair from Cheyne Walk.

=== First visit to Iceland ===
The first title published by Heinemann was Caine's 1890 three-volume novel The Bondman, a plot of revenge and romance set in the late 18th century Isle of Man and Iceland. It commences with the story of a seaman who marries the daughter of Iceland's Governor-General, abandoning her before the birth of their child. Between June and November 1889 it was serialised in the Isle of Man Times, General Advertiser and several provincial newspapers. Accompanied by Mary, Caine made a research visit to Iceland in August 1889, during which he made a seventy-mile round day trip from Reykjavík to Krýsuvík. William Heinemann was so pleased with initial sales, eventually selling almost half a million copies, that he named his company's telegraphic address after the novel's main character, "Sunlocks".

=== Cumbria ===
Caine leased Castlerigg Cottage in Keswick in 1888. The following year Caine bought Hawthorns out of part of his earnings from Ben-my-Chree. Hawthorns was a small square-built stone house on the Penrith Road, a mile outside Keswick, overlooking Bassenthwaite Lake and Derwentwater. Caine also rented a pied-à-terre at Albert Mansions, Victoria Street, London. Hawthorns was close to Chesnut Cottage that Shelley had rented in 1811 and Greta Hall home of the poets Coleridge and Southey. The house had ten acres of land where Caine kept two ponies he had transported from Iceland. Mary learned to make butter and cheese. The Caines lived at Hawthorns for four years.

In 1890 Bram Stoker began his notes for his Dracula novel. Caine published a magazine serial in 1895 called Unto the Third and Fourth Generation. Stoker and Caine were lifetime literary friends. They shared an interest in mesmerism. Prior to being published in book form the story was renamed Drink: A Love Story on a Great Question. Drink contains a number of similarities to Stoker's novel. In 1906 Drink was published by George Newnes, and illustrated by expatriate Italian American illustrator and painter Cyrus Cuneo. It was described in the Manchester Guardian as 'a rather gruesome love story'. The story is of a girl who inherits a taste for alcohol from her father and is put on the road to recovery by hypnotic influence. Two hundred thousand copies of the book had been sold in England by the time the American edition was published by Appleton in 1907.

=== Banning of Mahomet ===
Caine's Mahomet is a four-act historical drama based on the life of Muhammad, the prophet of Islam, written in 1890 for the actor-manager Henry Irving. In Autumn 1889 Irving presented a copy of Henri de Bornier's new play Mahomet to Caine, translated into English by Bram Stoker's wife, Florence. Irving had been granted the English rights by Jules Claretie, director of France's Théâtre Français and he asked Caine to revise it for staging at the Lyceum. The French government stopped Bornier's play on 22 March 1890, partly due to the intervention of the Ottoman Sultan Abdul Hamid II. Caine called the play's plot "false to history, untrue to character, Western in thought and Parisian in sentiment". He continued with his own version that concentrated on Muhammad's flight from Mecca and his triumphant return from Medina years later. Scenes were handwritten by Caine and subsequently reviewed by Irving after Stoker had them typed. Reviewed pages were returned with Irving's edits and often Stoker's suggestions. On 20 June a piece appeared in the French Journal des débats soon followed by a longer piece in The Pall Mall Gazette connecting Bornier's Mahomet with Irving's English production. William Henry (Abdullah) Quilliam orchestrated protests. In common with Caine he was of Manx descent, raised in Liverpool and had visited Morocco. Converting to Islam, Quilliam set up Britain's first mosque and was made Sheikh al-Islam for the British Isles by Abdul Hamid II. Rumour that the play would be produced in London caused unrest in Britain's Muslim communities, threatened British rule in parts of India and strained the nation's relations with the Ottoman Empire. It was banned by the Lord Chamberlain, Edward Bootle-Wilbraham, 1st Earl of Lathom in his capacity as licencer of stage plays. Lathom's intervention was unusual, illustrating the high level of concern by the British government. Caine's completed play was accepted by Edward Smith Willard for production in America. Influenced by Renan's Life of Christ he spent the remainder of 1890 hastily writing his own version. Dissatisfied with the result he refused to publish the book, despite being offered three thousand pounds for it in 1894.

=== Morocco ===
Caine travelled to Tangier, Morocco, for three weeks in March 1890, researching Muslim and Jewish life. Disregarding the advice of British consular officials Caine explored the Kasbah alone on foot at all hours of the day and night. Returning to Tangier in Spring 1891 to pick up local colour for his next novel The Scapegoat, he suffered an attack of malarial fever. Caine became the house-guest of Ion Perdicaris, who arranged Caine's nursing until he was sufficiently recovered to return to England. In July of the same year The Little Manx Nation was published. It was originally delivered in the form of three lectures on the history of the Isle of Man which were given at the Royal Institution, London on 22 and 29 January and 4 February 1891. The book is dedicated to Manx poet Thomas Edward Brown, who supplied Caine with information on Manx legends and ballads.

The Scapegoat was written at Hawthorns immediately after Caine returned home from Morocco, while he was still impeded by malaria. First serialised in The Illustrated London News between July and October 1891, and then in The Penny Illustrated Paper between October 1891 January 1892. In the story, little Naomi is deaf and dumb and blind. Her mother is dead. She lives with her father, in Israel's house. As Israel changes his ways to become a better person Naomi starts to regain her lost senses. The novel was published in two volumes in September 1891 by William Heinemann, and simultaneously in Europe, America and Canada. Set in Morocco in the last years of the Sultan Abd er-Rahman, it exposed anti-Semitic persecution and was described as a 'scathing indictment of Moroccan tyranny'. The book was praised by 'the most intelligent and influential members of the respectable Jewish community in London'. Caine's Connections with the British Jewish community extended back to Caine's youth. Novelist Israel Zangwill enlisted Caine in the Zionist movement. The Scapegoat brought Caine a considerable correspondence, mainly because of its pro-Jewish stance. At this time Caine and Mary's second son, Derwent was born on 12 September 1891.

=== Mission to Russia ===
Following the publication of The Scapegoat, Caine was approached by Hermann Adler, the Chief Rabbi and chairman of the Russo-Jewish Committee. Jews were fleeing Russia due to the pogroms and resulting atrocities happening there. Adler, certain no Jew would be allowed entry, requested Caine go to Russia and Poland on behalf of the committee. Caine's plans to depart for Russia after Christmas 1891 were delayed until 15 June 1892 due to famine and riots there. Caine funded the trip himself, refusing subsidies offered by the committee. He carried Adler's letter, in Hebrew, to present to the rabbis in the various towns on his journey, which "secured him everywhere a most hospitable reception" and for protection against the Russian authorities Caine carried a letter from Lord Salisbury, then Prime Minister. Caine managed to visit several Jewish communities in the Pale of Settlement but got no further than the frontier towns as many were dying due to a cholera outbreak. Fearing he was to suffer the same fate he returned to London, in time to attend Lord Alfred Tennyson's funeral in October 1892. Caine remained in London after the funeral working on three novellas Cap'n Davey's Honeymoon, The Last Confession and The Blind Mother, published in 1893 as one volume entitled Cap'n Davey's Honeymoon. The book was edited by and dedicated to Stoker. At his suggestion, the last part of the title story was rewritten and The Last Confession was added. Set in Morocco, The Last Confession is based on Rossetti's blank-verse poem of the same name.

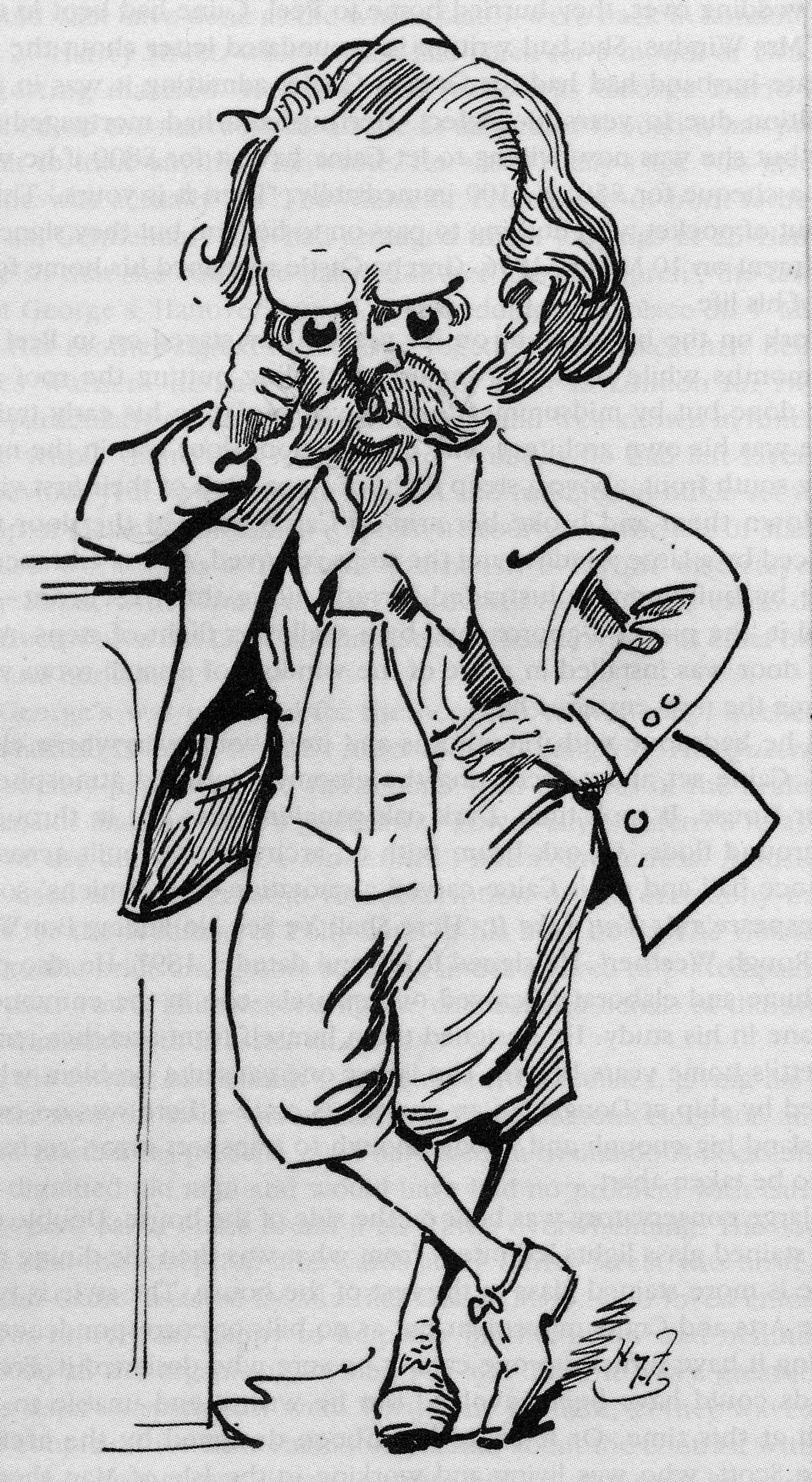
Cartoon of Caine by Harry Furniss

=== Isle of Man ===
For the purpose of writing The Manxman Caine rented Greeba Castle for six months, a castellated house in the Isle of Man overlooking the Douglas to Peel road. It was this book, published as one volume in August 1894 by Heinemann, that ended the system of three-volume novels. It is the story of Pete, a fisherman, considered by Kate's father as too poor to marry her. Pete leaves to make his fortune, and is reported dead. Kate falls in love with Philip, Pete's cousin and friend. Pete returns, creating a dilemma. The character of Pete was based on the Peel fishermen Caine mixed with and Joseph Mylchreest, a Manxman who made his fortune diamond mining in South Africa. Caine took full advantage of the subsequent Press attention. He was photographed and interviewed for the monthly magazines. The British sales of The Manxman totalled nearly 400,000. It was translated into twelve languages, selling over half a million copies by 1913. While in London in June and July 1894, Caine wrote a dramatic version of The Manxman, with Philip as the main character. Caine offered it to Herbert Beerbohm Tree, who refused it as being unlikely to appeal to the Haymarket Theatre audiences. On 22 August 1894, three weeks after the book was published, Wilson Barrett's adaptation opened at the Grand Theatre, Leeds. Caine bought the Greeba Castle estate in 1896 with part of his earnings from The Manxman. His rented London home, 48 Ashley Gardens, in one of five red-brick Victorian mansion blocks adjacent to Westminster Cathedral, was changed to 2 Whitehall Court between Whitehall and the Victoria Embankment.

Caine wrote a guidebook entitled The Little Man Island: Scenes and Specimen Days in the Isle of Man for the 1894 tourist season. Published by the Isle of Man Steam Packet Company it comprises a mixture of descriptions, pictures and advertising. At the end of the 19th century the Isle of Man was a popular tourist destination, a result of the Wakes Weeks, when Lancashire mills and factories closed for holidays. To meet growing demand the Isle of Man Steam Packet Company purchased new steamers to bring many thousands of tourists to Douglas from Liverpool. The Isle of Man Advertising Committee was set up in 1894 under the Advertising Rate Act. A group of bankers, local businessmen and developers built new hotels, boarding houses and entertainment venues. They formed a Committee publicising the Isle of Man as a holiday resort, opening an office in London with Caine's brother in charge. When Caine wrote The Deemster in six weeks at a boarding house on the Douglas esplanade he saw these developments. He believed that the Island's economic prosperity lay in developing this trade. The success of Caine's novels set in the Isle of Man boosted the tourist trade. Tynwald Day, the island's national day, became better known both in England and America because of his novels. Caine and Greeba Castle became a visitor attraction. Cruising around Great Britain aboard the Royal yacht, King Edward VII and Queen Alexandra visited the Isle of Man, in August 1902. They were the first British monarchs to set foot on Manx soil. The King had read most of Caine's works and through reading them he wanted to visit the island. The Queen enjoyed Caine's Manx novels and was interested to see where his characters lived. The royal party enjoyed Caine's hospitality. He was invited to join the royal couple on their yacht and to accompany them on their tour of the island the following day.

=== Canadian copyright ===
At a time copyrights in Canada were governed by British laws and legal framework the Canadian Government was attempting to enact their 1889 Copyright Bill. Canadian publishers sought to exclude competition from the United States. Collection of duty on imported foreign reprints of British copyright books was to be stopped after 27 March 1895. This situation, named the Canadian copyright question, caused concern to the British Government and they involved both the Copyright Association and the Society of Authors, asking them to comment. During the ongoing discussions Caine maintained high profile, his interventions changing the course of the debate. Publishers in American recognised the threat of their market being flooded with cheap Canadian reprints on which no copyright fees would be paid. Proposed by Caine, the Society of Authors passed a unanimous vote, on 25 February 1895, against the Canadian Copyright Act. Caine suggested "all authors should bind together to oppose the passing of the Act". The Society sent a petition to the Marquess of Rippon, signed by over 1500 mainly authors and publishers, requesting Queen Victoria withhold assent of the Canadian Copyright Bill. If passed, there would be nothing preventing other colonies asking for the same, threatening authors with the loss of the whole Colonial market. The Society of Authors invited Caine to act as their representative in Canada and to negotiate with the Canadian Government on the 1889 Canadian Act. Similarly Frederick Richard Daldy represented the Copyright Association. Edmund Newcome, the Canadian Deputy Minister of Justice, eventually visited England in August 1895 to address the Canadian copyright problem, after his plans to visit had been postponed multiple times. Newcombe, instructed only to meet with the government, met with Joseph Chamberlain, Secretary of State for the Colonies, in London to begin work on a new draft copyright bill. The Copyright Association and the Society of Authors were kept informed of proceedings.

=== First visit to the United States and Canada ===
Caine arrived in New York 25 September 1895, accompanied by his wife Mary and eldest son Ralph, where they were met by his New York publisher William Appleton, an active in the struggle for an international copyright. He carried with him a letter of introduction to the Government of Canada from Chamberlain. On the street he was mobbed by fans. The following month Caine reached Canada, where he met with leading members of the publishing trade. He had long discussions with the Canadian Prime Minister Mackenzie Bowell and the Canadian Minister of Justice Charles Tupper in Ottawa. At the request of the Canadian Copyright Association Caine went to Toronto where he had talks with the Toronto publishers. Caine resolved the dispute between the Canadian publishers, the Canadian Copyright Association and English authors. The proposed solution, that Canadian publishers would have the right to republish copyright works that had not been published in Canada within sixty days of publication elsewhere, was incorporated into the draft copyright bill. On 25 November 1895 Caine presented the draft bill at the Ottawa copyright conference where all parties agreed to it. The Canadian authorities and publishers were satisfied with the proposal put forward from England as were the American authors and publishers. The bill never became law, the 1889 Act was abandoned and a more flexible solution was found by 1900.

== Peak years ==
=== Second visit to the United States ===
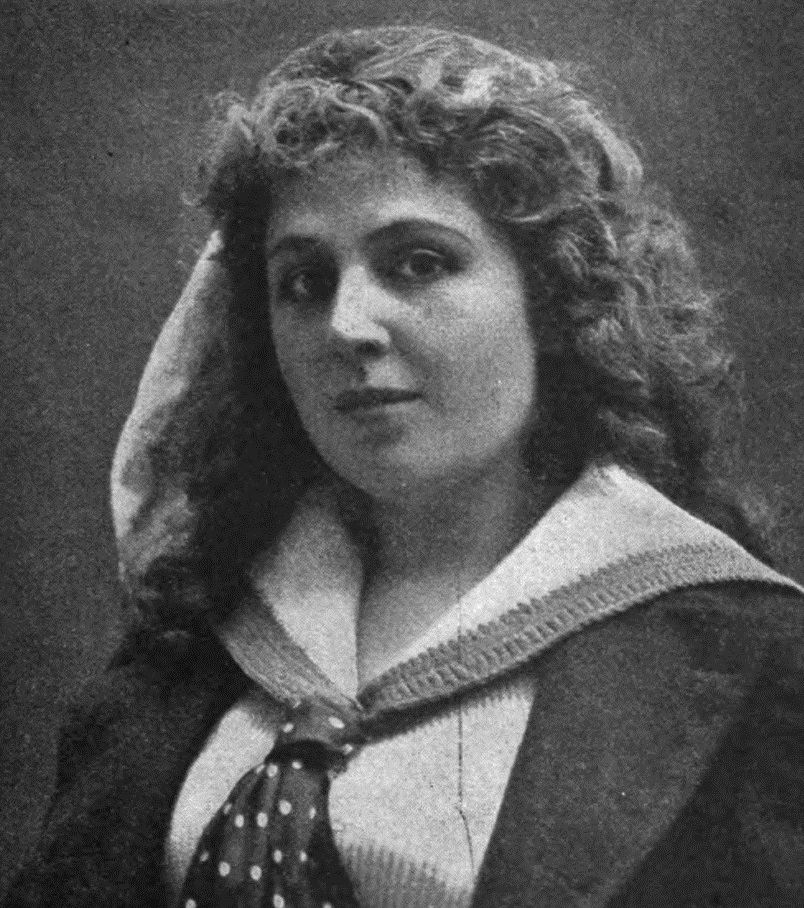
Viola Allen as Glory Quayle This portrait shows Viola Allen as she would have appeared in the prologue of The Christian

Taking two years to write, Caine's novel The Christian was published by Heinemann in 1897. It is the first novel in Britain to have sold over a million copies The book was inspired by Rossetti's verses Mary Magdalene at the Door of Simon The Pharisee, written for his painting, depicting a man trying to pluck back a woman about to enter the gates of heaven. Caine followed it with a lecture tour of Scotland, a one-man dramatic performance of his novelette Home Sweet Home. The Christian was serialised in Britain in the Windsor Magazine between December 1896 and November 1897 and in the United States in Munsey's Magazine between November 1896 and January 1898. Mainly set in Victorian London, it is the story of Glory Quayle, a young woman living an independent life who becomes an actress, and John Storm, who enters the priesthood. It was the first time that Caine had taken up the Woman Question. The character of John Storm is drawn from a composite of the Hon. and Rev. James Adderley, an Anglican priest of Berkeley Chapel, Mayfair, London, and Father Stanton, who became an Anglican bishop. Caine dramatised the book in 1896. His play was so popular with the public that the Daily Mail published it in a thick-paper, illustrated edition. He directed the play, travelling to New York where he went on to deliver a series of lectures and readings there. Viola Allen produced the play for the first time on the stage at Albany, New York on 25 September 1898. It opened at the Knickerbocker Theatre on 10 October 1898, running for twenty-one weeks in New York. Almost one thousand clergymen attended a matinee on 15 November 1898. George C. Tyler, reportedly made one million dollars from the Broadway production of The Christian. On his return to London after being on tour, Wilson Barratt gave Caine half of an advance payment received from an Australian manager for Barratt's stage adaptation of The Christian. Caine rejected both the money and the play. Barratt unsuccessfully sued Caine on the grounds that they had an agreement to collaborate on the dramatisation. The Christian was first produced in England at the Duke of York's Theatre in October 1899. It failed after two months. Caine authorised a touring production with his sister Lily playing Glory Quayle and managed by her husband George Day which in 1907 was still continuously performed by up to three companies. After Finnish politician and writer Aino Malmberg sought aid from Caine on her country's behalf, he offered the Finnish rights to the Finnish National Theatre. Finland belonged to the Russian Empire and was actively seeking Independence. Malmberg translated Caine's works into Finnish.

=== Rome ===
Caine and his wife, Mary, spent four winters in Rome, renting a house, 18 Trinità de' Monti, near the Spanish Steps. On their visit between January and April 1901 Caine finished The Eternal City, his greatest commercial success. It is Caine's only novel to be first conceived as a play. The story begins in Rome in 1900 at the fictional Pope Pius X's jubilee celebrations, at the height of the dispute between the Vatican and the Italian state on the temporal power of the Church. David Rossi, a socialist and republican is accused of conspiring to assassinate the Italian king. He opposes Baron Bonelli, a corrupt prime minister. Bonelli tries to prevent the culmination of the love story between his mistress Donna Roma Volonna and Rossi. The Eternal City was serialised in Britain in 1901 in The Lady's Magazine and in the United States in Collier's Weekly, between February and August 1901. Immediately afterwards it was published in book form by Heinemann, with an initial print run of 100,000, running to twenty-six editions, selling more than a million copies in English alone and translated into thirteen languages. The stage adaptation opened at His Majesty's Theatre, London on 2 October 1902, produced by actor-manager Herbert Beerbohm Tree, with incidental music by Italian composer Pietro Mascagni. A week after the play opened in London, Caine republished the novel, cutting all the political parts and following the story of the play making it into a 'theatre edition'. The American production of The Eternal City premiered on 17 November, at the Victoria Theatre, New York City, with Viola Allen as Roma, Frederic De Belleville as Bonelli, and Edward J. Morgan as Rossi. Caine supervised rehearsals. Towards the end of 1903 six companies were performing The Eternal City, in England, USA, Australia and South Africa.

=== Household Words ===
In 1901 Caine bought Household Words, the literary magazine founded by Charles Dickens in 1850. He appointed his son Ralph as editor, and it was sold in 1904. The Eternal City appeared as two instalments in the Christmas 1901 and January 1902 editions. He made many contributions including articles about Pope Leo XIII, whom he had a private audience with, the story A Maid of Mona and a serialisation of The Manxman. His writings on Roman Catholicism caused serious offence to his fellow members of the National Club of London, founded as a Protestant club.

Between 1902 and 1904 the Caine's rented a large early Victorian house in London on Wimbledon Common, The Hermitage. It had been the last home of Scottish novelist Margaret Oliphant.

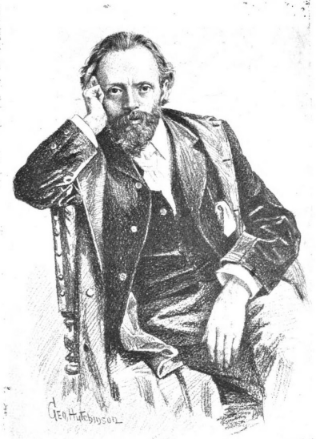
Hall Caine by George Wylie Hutchinson

=== Second visit to Iceland ===
To obtain local colour for his novel The Prodigal Son Caine visited Iceland in 1903. On one of two exploration trips that started from Reykjavik Caine discovered a cave about 200 feet long in the valley of Thingvellir, afterwards named "Hall's Hellin" (Hall's cave). On 26 August Caine was at the close of the Iceland Althing where he was a guest of Magnús Stephensen, the island's Governor. At the Parliamentary dinner which followed, Caine was introduced "as a distinguished "skald" (bard), whose writings were widely known and greatly admired in Iceland". The Prodigal Son was published in November 1904 by Heinemann and translated into thirteen languages. It is set in a sheep-rearing community in rural Iceland, with scenes in London and the French Riviera. In The Prodigal Son Magnus learns on his wedding day that his bride, Thora, is in love with his brother Oscar, a composer. She marries Oscar after Magnus releases her from the engagement. When Thora dies, a distraught Oscar places the only copies of his compositions in her coffin. Later he has her grave opened and his music retrieved. Caine's use of a similar event to Rossetti's exhumation of Elizabeth Siddal, where Rossetti recovered his poems that he had buried with her, caused a lasting rift between Caine and the Rossetti family. The Prodigal Son was simultaneously dramatised, the copyright performance held at the Grand Theatre, Douglas. American and British productions opened days apart in 1905, at the National Theatre in Washington, D.C., on 28 August, the New Amsterdam Theatre in New York City on 4 September and at the Theatre Royal, Drury Lane, London on 7 September, with George Alexander playing Oscar and Caine's sister Lilian playing Thora. After a long run at Drury Lane it was revived in 1907.

In September 1906 Caine's dramatised version of The Bondman was produced in London's Theatre Royal, Drury Lane, with Mrs Patrick Campbell playing a leading role and Caine's son, Derwent (aged sixteen), making a stage début. A copyright performance had taken place at the Theatre Royal, Bolton in November 1982. Caine revised the play for Arthur Collins, moving part of the story to Sicily and creating a happy ending. The highlight of the show was the sulphur mine explosion and volcano eruption. In April 1906 Collins and Caine had gone on a research trip where they spent a day with Leone Testa, the inspector-general of Sicily's sulphur mines and while visiting Naples they witnessed Mount Vesuvius erupt. The show ran for eleven weeks followed by eight weeks at the Adelphi Theatre and a revival of The Prodigal Son. The production went on tour in the UK and America. Japanese actor and a founder of Japanese modern theatre Otojirō Kawakami staged the play in Japan in 1909, changing the setting to Japan and the Philippines and included the volcanic eruption. When Kawakami's new western style theatre Teikoku-za opened in Osaka in March 1910 the first production was The Bondman.

1908 saw the publication of My Story, described by Bram Stoker as "autobiographical rather than an autobiography and gives insight to the life and character of his many friends and their influence on his life and work, and of the gradual growth of his mind and of his importance in the world as the success of each book gave him further opportunities."

=== Egyptian nationalism ===
On 13 June 1906 British officers shot pigeons for sport in Denshawai, an Egyptian village whose inhabitants were pigeon farmers, resulting in a clash between the officers and several villagers. One villager, falsely accused of murder was killed on the spot. Four villagers were hanged and others punished by jail sentences, hard labour and lashings. The Denshawai Incident proved a turning point in the history of the British occupation of Egypt, starting a fierce political debate both in Egypt and Britain in which intellectuals and men of letters participated, eventually causing the resignation of Lord Cromer, the redoubtable British Consul General and de facto ruler of Egypt since 1882. Crucially poet Wilfred Scawen Blunt exposed the facts in his pamphlet Atrocities of Justice Under British Rule in Egypt, provoking a public outcry in Britain. George Bernard Shaw drafted a petition published in The New Age with the main purpose of gaining the release of the Egyptian prisoners. Shaw denounces the "Denshawai horror" in his Preface to Politicians that introduces his John Bull's Other Island. Caine's literary response to the debate is his controversial novel The White Prophet. Shaw reviews The White Prophet and opposes literary censorship in Bernard Shaw on Shams of Rule and of Religion. Set in Egypt at the start of the twentieth century, twenty years into the British occupation and opening with a ceremonial re-enactment of the Battle of Omdurman, The White Prophet is the story of Colonel Charles George Lord, a British officer who joins the crusade of Ishmael Ameer, a Muslim prophet against selfishness and sedition. Lord compares him with Christ and John the Baptist. Ameer plans a coup against the British in Sudan, after developing political ambitions. The White Prophet is Caine's only book never to have been reprinted; its sympathies for Egyptian nationalism rendered it a commercial failure. Caine used material from Mahomet and The Mahdi in the novel. Accompanied by his wife, he made three research visits to Egypt, March to May 1907, then January to May in 1908 and similarly in 1909 when he was joined by actor manager Herbert Beerbohm Tree. Cromer failed to meet Caine during his visit to Egypt in 1907, instead Caine wrote urging him to grant the Egyptians wish "for a speedy fulfilment of England's promise to get out of Egypt as soon as it was safe to do so" and to "yield to legitimate claims to national independence". Originally entitled The White Christ, it was serialised in the British and US editions of The Strand Magazine between December 1908 and November 1909, and subsequently translated into seven languages. The Arabic translation was serialised in Cairo-based newspaper al-Minbar. Douglas Sladen read the first two instalments of The White Prophet and had the idea of writing a counterblast, the novel The Tragedy of the Pyramids: A Romance of Army Life in Egypt. Closing the preface he writes "I felt bound to challenge the false light in which he presents the British Army of Occupation in Egypt to the public". A copyright performance was performed at the Garrick Theatre, London on 27 November 1908. Beerbohm Tree's plans to produce a dramatised version at His Majesty's Theatre, London, which he was to direct and star in, were abandoned following threats to lobby the Lord Chamberlain against granting a licence for the play, banning it. Cromer is reported to have protested to the Lord Chamberlain's Department that "the state of the Nationalist agitation in Egypt made a dramatic representation of some of its features injudicious". The character of John Lord is widely believed to be Cromer. Promoting the publication of The White Prophet by Heinemann on 12 August 1909, Caine published a series of eight articles Aspects of the East in The Daily Telegraph. Heinemann published Shaw's The Critics of The White Prophet as a pamphlet, endorsing the novel's political viewpoint. It was to have been the preface for the second edition.

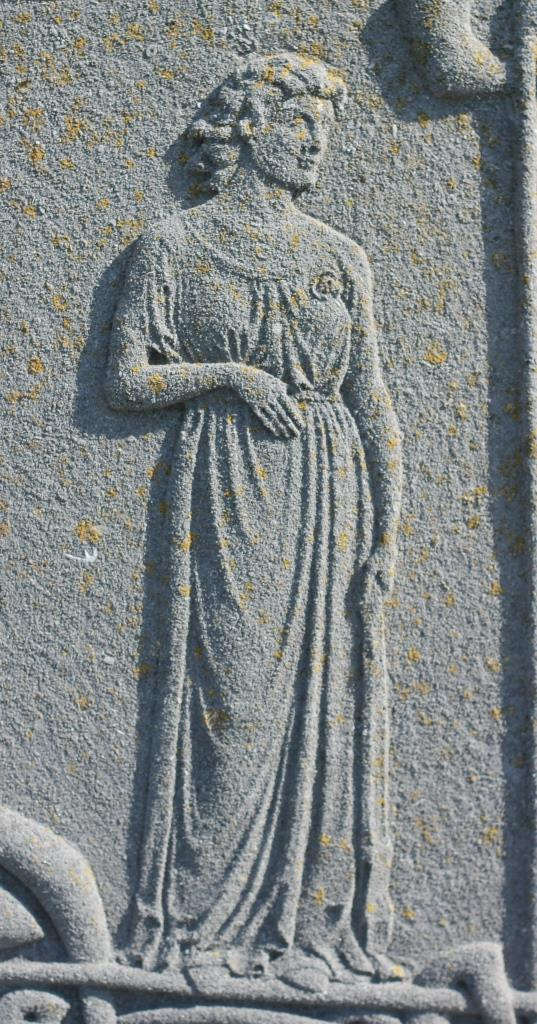
Image of Mary O'Neill, carved on Caine's tombstone.

The Honourable Hall Caine MHK

Member of the House of Keys for Ramsey
- In office 1901–1908
- Monarch: Edward VII
- Lieutenant Governor: George Somerset, 3rd Baron Raglan
- Succeeded by: William Crennell

Personal details
- Party: Independent

On 15 August 1910, Caine's new stage adaptation of The Deemster entitled The Bishop's Son opened at the Grand Theatre, Douglas, Isle of Man, with Caine's son, Derwent, playing Dan. It went on to open at London's Garrick Theatre on 28 September 1910 with Bransby Williams as Dan, which ran for seven performances.

=== Controversy of The Woman Thou Gavest Me ===
Caine's novel The Woman Thou Gavest Me: Being the Story of Mary O'Neill, published by Heinemann in 1913, "caused the biggest furore of any of his novels". Translated into nine languages, worldwide advance orders for the book exceeded 200,000. From October 1912 it was serialised in Britain in Nash's Magazine and concurrently in the United States in Hearst's Magazine. The following month serialisation began in The Australian Women's Weekly. Circulating libraries divided new books into three categories: satisfactory, doubtful and objectionable. They attempted to boycott The Woman Thou Gavest Me along with Compton Mackenzie's Sinister Street and W. B. Maxwell's The Devil's Garden, for failing their criteria. The authors directed a publicity campaign opposing the boycott. The Woman Thou Gavest Me, the second of Caine's novels to address the Woman Question, "arraigns the divorce laws" of the time. Father Bernard Vaughan, known for his sermons on The Sins of Society, denounced Caine's book saying "it showed startling ignorance of Roman Catholic doctrine and practice". The novel was one of several books the Catholic Federation in Auckland, New Zealand wanted removed from sale. In Wyndham, Western Australia the committee of Little River Mechanics Institute Free Library ordered the book banned and burnt. American newspapers reported of a Methodist preacher's daughter that eloped and married the son of a prominent family, who later divorced her and took away her child. She was arrested on the street for Immorality. After three days in jail Eugene V. Debs, five times Socialist candidate for President of the United States sheltered her in his home. It was Debs' "challenge to the Christianity of Terre Haute", Indiana. Parallels were drawn between the problem that Debs handled in real life and Caine's fictional story of Mary O'Neill, who marries unhappily and ends up on the street without shelter, with the whole world turned against her. The Woman Thou Gavest Me was reprinted five times before the end of 1913 when nearly half a million copies had been sold. The Times Literary Supplement listed it as the most popular novel of that year. New York's Bookman, listed it as the fifth best-seller of October 1913.

English fiction was represented in Europe by Hall Caine, as French fiction was by Anatole France, Italian by Gabriele D'Annunzio, and German by Hermann Sudermann. "Among English novelists who have made from fifty to sixty cents for every word in a long novel are Hall Caine and Marie Corelli. Compared with such money earners as these, Dickens, Thackeray, and George Eliot were poorly paid for their labor".

== Politics ==
On 24 October 1901, Caine was elected a Member of the House of Keys in a by-election as a liberal-aligned independent for the constituency of Ramsey, Isle of Man, by a majority of 267 votes. Caine sought election to the Keys after the collapse of Dumbell's Banking Company on Friday 2 February 1900. The crash resulted in a number of resignations and retirements, resulting in eleven by-elections. The Bank had held most of the island's cash deposits and left businesses and residents without money. At the General election in 1903 Caine was re-elected for another five years.

During Caine's election campaign he supported dominion status for the Island with a Manxman as Lieutenant-Governor, a directly elected Legislative Council and departmental officials appointed by and responsible to Tynwald. A pamphlet entitled Hall Caine's Letters and Speeches on Manx Politics was published in 1903, containing his election speech and articles he wrote for the Daily Mail and Black and White, describing his experiences and aspirations. In recognition of his single election speech Caine was appointed vice-president of the Land Nationalisation Society of Great Britain.

The Manx National Reform League made constitutional and social reform the central issues in the general election of 1903, after an extra-parliamentary initiative by journalist and printer Samuel Norris. It was influenced by Liberal demands for political change in the United Kingdom. In 1903 Caine was elected the first president of the Manx National Reform League. In 1904 the new House of Keys established a committee on constitutional reform, chaired by Caine, that prepared the 1907 petition for constitutional reform.

Caine retired from active politics in 1908. Due to the other pressures on his time he seldom spoke in the Keys. He also had little time to offer to politics on a larger scale. Prior to the Ramsey by-election, Caine was invited by Lloyd George to stand for the British parliament but he refused.

== The Great War ==
Caine was aged 61 at the outbreak of the Great War. The British secretly set up the War Propaganda Bureau under MP Charles Masterman. Caine was one of twenty-five leading authors Masterman invited to the Bureau's London headquarters, Wellington House on 2 September 1914 with the purpose of best promoting Britain's interests during the war. Shortly after, Caine was one of fifty-three of the leading authors in Britain to sign the 'Authors' Declaration', a manifesto drafted by Masterman stating that Britain "could not without dishonour have refused to take part in the present war." Issued on 17 September, the document was sent by special cable to the New York Times. Caine abandoned literary contracts in America valued at 150,000 dollars in order to devote all his energies to the British war effort.

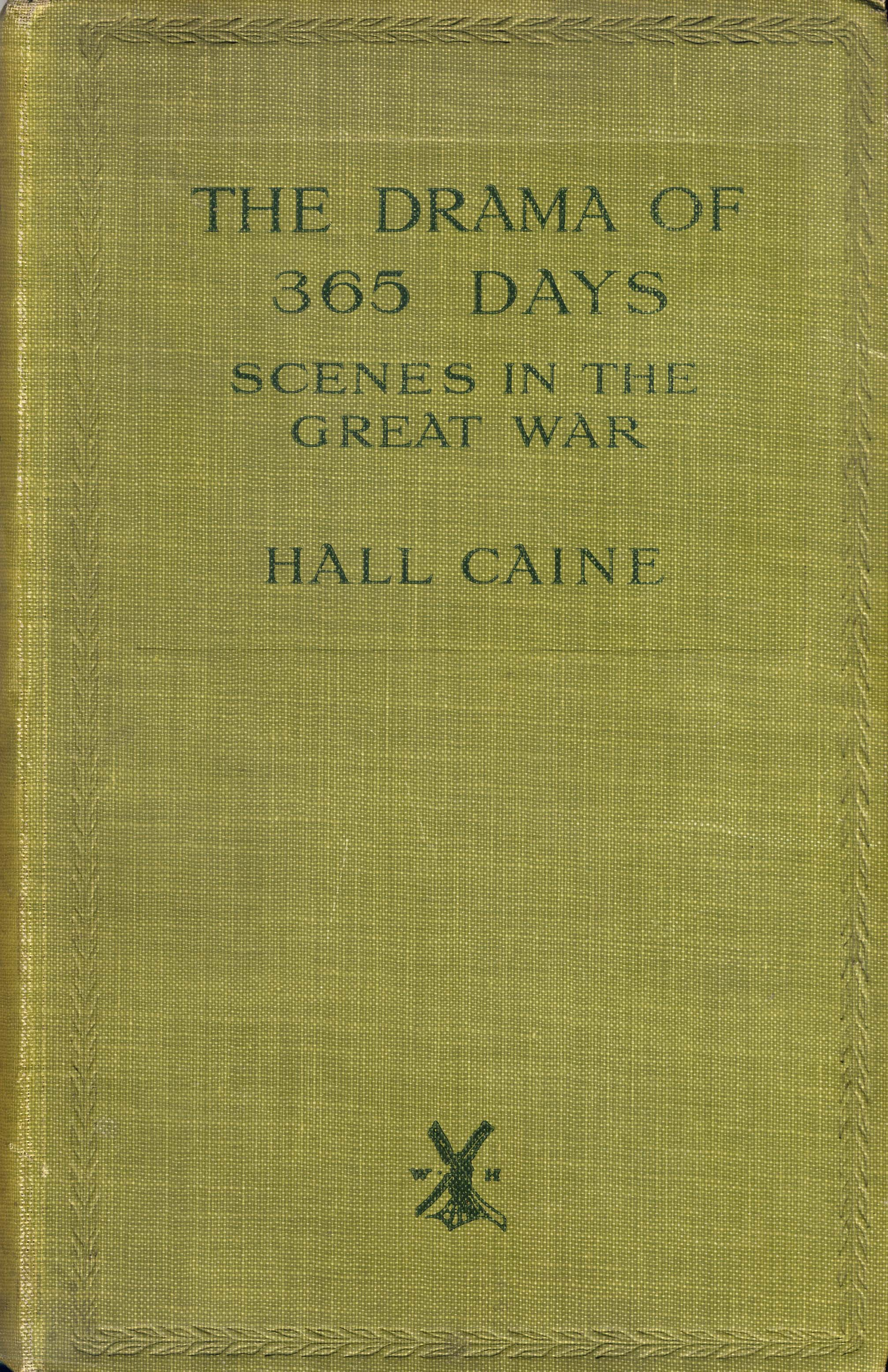
The cover of The Drama of 365 Days: Scenes in the Great War, Caine's series of Daily Telegraph World War I propaganda articles. The book is dedicated to the young manhood of the British Empire.

Following the Rape of Belgium Caine edited King Albert's Book in support of the exiled King Albert of Belgium. It was Caine's idea and was published at Christmas 1914 by The Daily Telegraph. The proceeds from the book, £20,000, went to the Daily Telegraph Belgium Fund, a fund created to support British efforts to receive and maintain Belgian refugees in Britain. In previous years Caine had edited several similar volumes already, the most recent for Queen Alexandra's charities in 1905 and 1908. Caine invited authors, artists, composers, statesmen and many notable people to present their view of events in Belgium. King Albert's Book contains contributions from 250 of the most famous people of the time. Among the contributors were the British Prime Minister H. H. Asquith, First Lord of the Admiralty Winston Churchill, painters Claude Monet and John Collier and composer Claude Debussy.

King Albert of Belgium made Caine an Officer of the Order of Leopold of Belgium for his humanitarian aid to the Belgian refugees in 1918. Caine's portrait by the Belgian painter, Alfred Jonniaux, was presented to him by the Fine Art Department of the Belgian Government. (Note: The painting disappeared from storage in the late 1950s.)

Caine wrote extensively in the British, American and Italian newspapers. He claimed that by this work and his personal influence with Italian statesmen he greatly helped bring Italy into the war on the side of the allies. President Woodrow Wilson had declared the United States neutral, and his policy of neutrality was enormously popular with the American people. Caine urged America to join the war by writing articles, mainly for The New York Times, and in 1915 he gave a series of lectures in the United States; but these were not well received. In September 1915, after a year of war, a series of articles featuring royalty, countries and events which included Archduke Ferdinand, the Kaiser and the Sinking of the RMS Lusitania that Caine had contributed to The Daily Telegraph were published as a book entitled The Drama of 365 Days: Scenes in the Great War. Caine attended Nurse Edith Cavell's memorial service in St Paul's Cathedral, London, on 29 October 1915; the World War I British nurse who is celebrated for saving the lives of soldiers in Brussels from all sides without distinction. His account was published in The Daily Telegraph on 30 October and extensively in other newspapers. In 1916 he was invited to work with Lord Robert Cecil at the Foreign Office towards the creation of the League of Nations after the end of the war. Our Girls: Their Work for the War, is the title of Caine's Christmas book published by Messrs Hutchinson early in December 1916, consisting of a series of Caine's articles written for the Ministry of Munitions, together with additional stories of women's working lives in the factories and in the hospitals. It was designed to be a gift for munitions girls to send to their men at the front.

The National War Aims Committee was set up in 1917 to focus on domestic propaganda. Caine was recruited for the committee by the Prime Minister David Lloyd George to write the screenplay for the propaganda film Victory and Peace, designed to show what would happen in a German invasion. Most of the negative of the newly finished film was destroyed in a fire at the offices of the London Film Company in June 1918. It was re-filmed over four months just as the war ended, but was never released.

Towards the end of 1917 Caine was offered a baronetcy in recognition of his contribution to the war effort as an allied propagandist and his position as a leading man of letters. Caine declined the hereditary honour and accepted a knighthood instead. He was made Knight Commander of the Most Excellent Order of the British Empire (KBE), insisting on being called, not 'Sir Thomas' but 'Sir Hall'.

== After the war ==
Caine's The Master of Man: The Story of a Sin had been begun in 1914, but set aside for the duration of the Great War. It was resumed on the day after Armistice Day in 1918. It is the story of Bessie Collister who has an illegitimate child. The baby's grandfather, Victor Stowell, as deemster, has to try Bessie for the murder of the child. Heinemann published the novel in July 1921. Out of the initial 100,000 copies printed, 70,000 were advance orders. Due to his age and health Caine announced it was to be his last novel. Sales of The Eternal City in English had reached one million, and 52 English editions of The Deemster had been published. A Collected Edition of Caine's novels followed, also published by Heinemann, issued not in order of publication but in the order of public demand. The following year Caine acquired the Sunday Illustrated newspaper which had been founded by Horatio Bottomley.

Caine's last novel The Woman of Knockaloe was brought out in 1923, this time published by Cassell's. Caine's strong anti-German feeling had turned to advocacy of reconciliation and pacifism. In the editorial note Newman Flower explains that the story was never intended to be published, but Flower happened to see the manuscript and persuaded Caine to publish it immediately. The book deals with the harm caused by racial hatred after Mona Craine, a Manxwoman, falls in love with Oskar Heine, a German prisoner of war. The scene of the story is Knockaloe, a farm near Peel on the west coast of the Isle of Man, turned into an internment camp 1914–1918 for alien civilians. Caine had been part owner of the farm, and had suggested the establishment of the camp to the government. The camp was the first and largest of its kind in Europe, containing about 25,000 aliens and 2,000 British guards. The site was 4 miles from Greeba Castle, Caine's Manx house. That year he sold the Sunday Illustrated. On Armistice Day 1923 Caine's first radio broadcast, A Counsel of Peace, was made to the nation from the British Broadcasting Corporation in London.

Caine's last published work in his lifetime was a revised version of Recollections of Rossetti, with a shortened title, to coincide with the centenary of Rossetti's birth in 1928.

During the last eight years of his life Caine devoted himself to his life's work, a Life of Christ, which he had begun in 1893. On at least three occasions Caine visited Palestine and Transjordania, the last in 1929; consulting the best-known theologians of the time, and reading every book he could obtain on the subject. His health broke down under the strain and the book remained unfinished. In the statement he prepared for his obituary was written, "one-fifth of the book is in a form fit for publication, the remainder not being in a condition which renders it possible that another author should complete it". The statement was disregarded by his sons and after extensive editing the book was published posthumously by his sons in 1938. The handwritten manuscript, including text and words, contained three million words, much of it indecipherable, to the extent that Caine's former secretaries were called in to transcribe it. An editor, journalist Robert Leighton, was employed to cut it down to half-a-million words. "It was severely criticised by the reviewers and the sales were not large".

Along with Winston Churchill, Caine was appointed to the Order of the Companions of Honour in October 1922 for his services to literature and was granted the Freedom of Douglas in 1929 for promoting the Isle of Man through his writings.

== Films ==
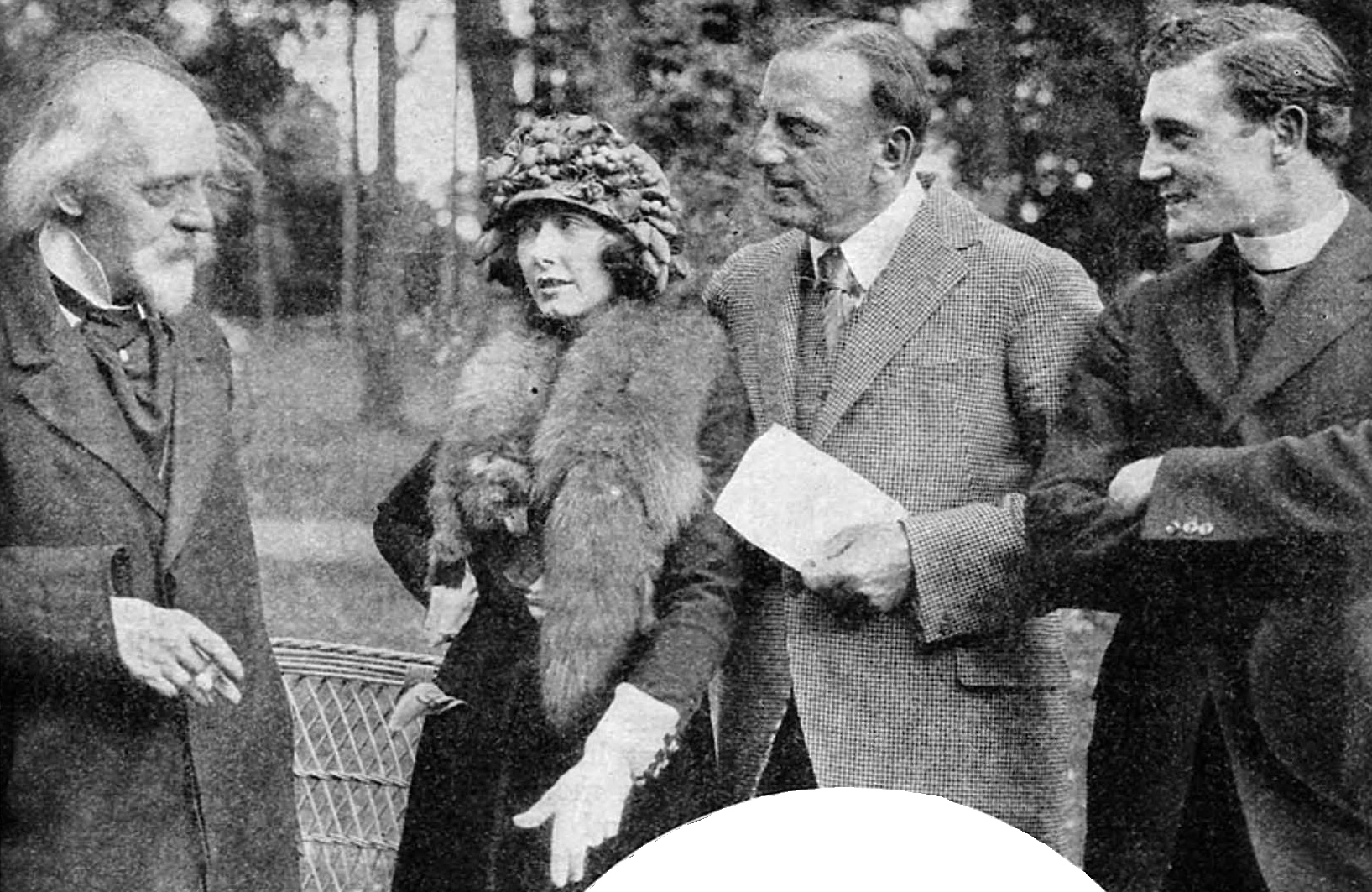
Hall Caine's visit to The Christian film set in 1922, Left to right: Caine, Mae Busch (Glory Quayle), Maurice Tourneur (Director), and Richard Dix (John Storm).

=== 1910s ===
Most of Caine's novels have been made into black-and-white silent films. The first film adaptation is The Christian (1911), by West's Pictures in Australia. The twenty-eight-minute unauthorised film is the first directed by Franklyn Barrett. The Christian features the cast of the stage production by William Anderson's Company. An unauthorised film of The Bondman (1916) was made by Fox Film Corporation in the United States and is the first film they released under their De Luxe brand. All of Fox's 110 musicians accompanied The Bondman screenings. The music is composed by Max Steiner, Fox's musical director. A financial and critical success it was re-released in 1918 as one of Fox's Big Six. A further film version of The Bondman was released as The Red Samson (1917) in the Austro-Hungarian Empire. The director was Michael Curtiz, who had by 1916 become one of Hungary's most important directors.

The first authorised film of a Caine novel is The Christian (1914) released in the United States by the Vitagraph Liebler Company. The first eight reel film they made. Vitagraph leased the Harris Theatre on West 42nd Street, for the purpose of exclusively showing their own films, opening with The Christian starring Earle Williams and Edith Storey. Caine wrote the film scenario, the first time ever that a famous author undertook a film scenario of their own work. Vitagraph staff writer Eugene Mullins followed Caine's own scenario.

Adapted and directed by established American screenwriter and director George Loane Tucker, The Christian (1915) was made by the London Film Company. The 9,000 feet film stars Caine's son Derwent Hall Caine as John Storm. The Manxman (1916), also produced by the London Film Company and directed by Tucker, was filmed on the Isle of Man and, when released drew huge crowds in Britain and America. It was one of the few British films distributed in the United States that went on to become a financial and critical success. Starring Derwent Hall Caine and Marian Swayne The Deemster (1917), made in the United States, is the first special feature film Arrow Film Corporation made. Shot on location on Block Island, Rhode Island, the film was originally entitled The Bishop’s Son after Caine's 1910 stage adaptation of The Deemster in which Derwent had also played Dan Mylrea and on which the film is based. Caine remained closely involved with the production; based in England, Caine reviewed the scenario and produced drawings of the character of the buildings to be used.

Adolph Zukor's Famous Players Film Company produced the first version of The Eternal City (1915). The $100,000 epic film features stage star Pauline Frederick. Made on location in London and Italy in 1914 the production was interrupted by the start of the Great War and was completed in New York. For distribution of initially The Eternal City and other prestigious feature-length films Famous Players created the Select Booking Agency. Caine cabled the producers after attending the British premiere at Marble Arch Pavilion, in London congratulating them. The film was re-released in 1918 as part of the Paramount "Success Series".

Prime Minister David Lloyd George recruited Caine in 1917 to write the screenplay for the propaganda film Victory and Peace (1918), made in Britain and directed by Herbert Brenon. Caine was appointed as chief adviser to the film campaign department of the National War Aims Committee. Lloyd George chose Caine due to his experience in the field of cinema and his "reputation as a man of letters". On 20 September 1917, in Ithaca, New York, Brenon's representative obtained the film rights of The Woman Thou Gavest Me from Derwent Hall Caine, Caine's American agent, intending to start work in November 1917. The film was advertised but it was never made by Brenon. Adapted for the screen by Beulah Marie Dix, The Woman Thou Gavest Me (1919) was made by Famous Players–Lasky. Katherine MacDonald, stars in the film as Mary MacNeil. Immediately after completing The Woman Thou Gavest Me she set up her own production company.

=== 1920s ===
Caine wrote the screenplay of Darby and Joan (1920). Made by Master Films the film was directed by Percy Nash featuring Derwent Hall Caine and Ivy Close. Many of the scenes were shot in the Isle of Man.

The fourth film adaptation of The Christian (1923) was by Goldwyn Pictures and directed by the celebrated Maurice Tourneur. Along with some of the cast, Tourneur travelled to the Isle of Man for location shooting where they were joined by Caine who co-operated in the filming of his work and held daily conferences with Tourneur. After the film was completed in the United States a print was sent to Caine in London where he wrote the intertitles.

Adapted and directed by A.E. Coleby The Prodigal Son (1923) was made by Stoll Pictures, the largest British film company of the early 1920s, as the centrepiece of their 1923 releases. Costing £37,000 it was at the time the most expensive British production made. The film's length at 18,454 feet made it the longest commercially made British film. The 4-hour 40-minute picture was released in two parts; part two titled The Return of the Prodigal.

Benito Mussolini featured in The Eternal City (1923) by the Samuel Goldwyn Company. Directed by George Fitzmaurice and shot on location in Rome less than a year after the March on Rome resulted in Mussolini's National Fascist Party rising to power in Italy. The film portrays Mussolini as a leader saving his people from communism. Caine disapproved of the adaptation and attempted to withdraw his name from it.

The first American made film by noted Swedish actor-director Victor Sjöström for Goldwyn Pictures was adapted from The Master of Man. The title was changed to "The Judge and the Woman" before settling on Name the Man (1924). Samuel Goldwyn began negotiating the film rights before the novel was finished.

The Woman of Knockaloe was filmed by Paramount Pictures in 1927 as Barbed Wire and is the second American made film by German director Erich Pommer. It deals with a phase of WWI where German prisoners of war suffer the hatred of the French women and yet find romance. Then Alfred Hitchcock arrived on the Isle of Man to film The Manxman (1929) but he and Caine did not get on well and the rest of the film was shot in Cornwall. The Manxman was Hitchcock's last silent film. Caine was not happy with it.

The British silent film The Bondman (1929) was directed by Herbert Wilcox.

=== 1930s ===
After retiring from the army in 1922, Colonel Hanna joined the British Board of Film Censors and held the position of vice-president and chief censor throughout the 1930s. Gaumont British's plan to film The White Prophet was abandoned after objections by Colonel Hanna as he thought it contained scenes with "a tendency to bring the British army into contempt and ridicule" and that "no scene of cavalry charging the mob and causing 100 deaths….would be permissible on the screen".

Shortly before Caine's death in 1931, Metro Goldwyn Mayer purchased the screen rights of The Christian with the intention of making a talking picture. The rights were reported as selling for £8000.

== Personal and domestic ==
In appearance Caine was a short man who tended to dress in a striking fashion. His eyes were dark brown and slightly protuberant, giving him an intense stare. He had red-gold hair and a dark red beard which he trimmed to appear like the Stratford bust of Shakespeare; indeed if people did not notice the likeness he was inclined to point it out to them. He was also preoccupied throughout his life with the state of his health. This was often the result of overwork or other stresses in his life and he sometimes used nervous exhaustion as an excuse to escape from his problems.

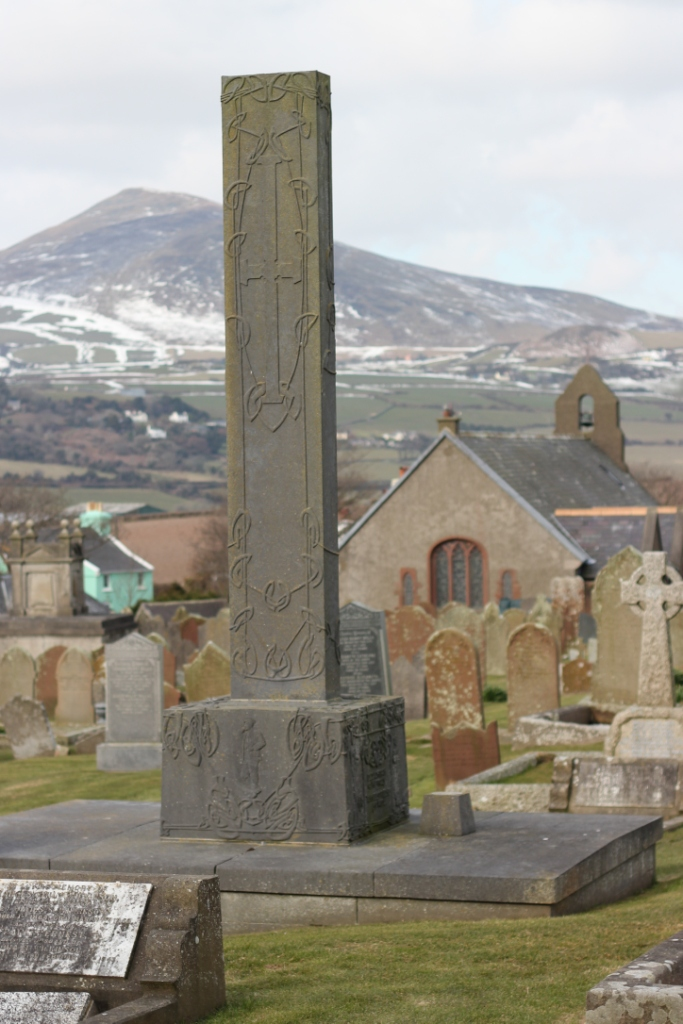
Hall Caine's grave, designed by Archibald Knox, Maughold, Isle of Man

In 1912, their son Derwent Hall Caine had an illegitimate daughter, Elin, and she was brought up as Caine and Mary's child. By 1914 Mary at last had her own house in London: Heath Brow, which overlooked Hampstead Heath. After the Great War this house had become too big, and Mary moved into Heath End House, again overlooking Hampstead Heath. By 1922 they were informally separated; Caine could not live with Mary, nor could he break with her completely. From that time, they both suffered from various ailments.

On 31 August 1931, aged 78 Caine slipped into a coma and died at his home, Greeba Castle, Isle of Man. On his death certificate is the diagnosis of "cardiac syncope". Following his death messages of condolence were received from the Prime Minister Ramsay MacDonald, King George V and Queen Mary.

At Caine's funeral on Friday 4 September 1931 representatives of all branches of public life in the Isle of Man followed the coffin. Sixty thousand Manx people and holiday makers paid tribute on the 25-mile journey. At Douglas great crowds lined the route and the majority of businesses closed. An address was made by the Bishop of Man. Caine was buried in Kirk Maughold churchyard.

A memorial service was held at St Martin-in-the-Fields, London on 9 September 1931. Rev. R.J. Campbell gave the address. The Prime Minister was represented by Charles Patrick Duff, and A.J. Sylvester represented Lloyd George. In March 1932, six months after her husband's death, Mary Hall Caine died from pneumonia. She was buried alongside her husband.

An Irish limestone obelisk depicting six characters from Caine's novels and a likeness of Mary was erected over their grave. The design is based on the ancient Maughold Parish Cross that is preserved in the churchyard. The memorial is the work of artist Archibald Knox.

A statue of Hall Caine stands in Douglas, financed by money from the estate of Derwent Hall Caine.

== Postscript ==
=== Caine's legacy ===
Hall Caine was a popular and best-selling author in his time. Crowds would gather outside his houses hoping to get a glimpse of him. He was "accorded the adulation reserved now for pop stars and footballers".

Allen suggests two reasons for this: the first that, in comparison with Dickens, his characters are not clearly drawn, but are "frequently fuzzy at the edges," while Dickens' characters are "diamond-clear"; and the second, that Caine's characters also tend to be much the same. Something similar could also be said about his plots. However, the main shortcoming may be that, although Caine's novels can be romantic and emotionally moving, they are bereft of humour and, on the contrary, replete with a deadly earnestness.

=== Critical appraisals ===
- Despite his proving the wealthiest of Victorian novelists, Caine has been largely dismissed as a mere melodramatist by subsequent criticism.
- G. K. Chesterton said in "A Defence of Penny Dreadfuls" that "it is quite clear that this objection, the objection brought by magistrates, has nothing to do with literary merit. Bad story writing is not a crime. Mr. Hall Caine walks the streets openly, and cannot be put in prison for an anticlimax."
- Thomas Hardy criticised Caine for his excessive egotism.
- According to Luther Munday in A Chronicle of Friendships, Oscar Wilde said that Caine "wrote at the top of his voice."

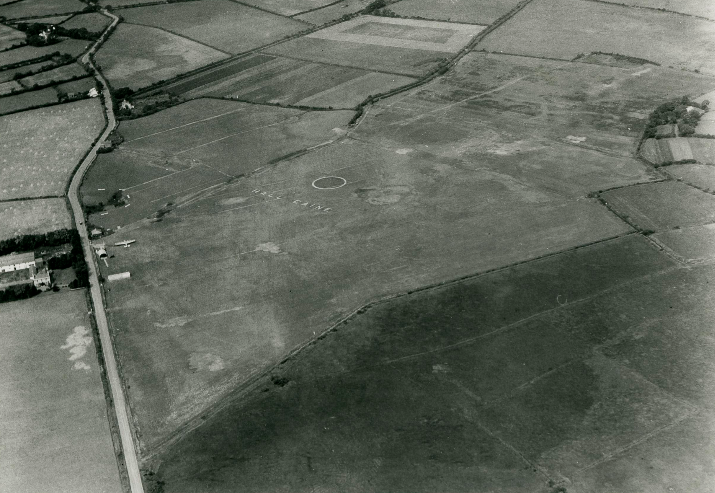
Aerial view of Hall Caine Airport, Isle of Man

=== Hall Caine Airport ===
Hall Caine Airport was an airfield on the Isle of Man which was located near Ramsey. It was named after the author by his sons Gordon Hall Caine and Derwent Hall Caine, who were the project initiators and Hall Caine Airport flourished for a short period prior to the outbreak of the Second World War. From 1935 to 1937 it handled domestic scheduled passenger flights to English, Scottish and Irish airports. By 1937 it had fallen into disuse, primarily due to its location. Both Gordon Hall Caine and Derwent Hall Caine were particularly keen on the development of an aerodrome as they saw it as another bit of the island as being associated with their late father. They were said to be extremely interested in the progress of the Isle of Man and in particular its transport infrastructure. They also wished to include Ramsey's municipal authority in the project, as they were both of the opinion that the aerodrome would bring immense benefit to the town.

The final commercial flight from Hall Caine Airport departed at 16:15hrs on Saturday 2 October 1937.

== Bibliography ==
=== Prose fiction ===
- 1885 – The Shadow of a Crime
- 1885 – She's All the World to Me: A Novel
- 1886 – A Son of Hagar
- 1887 – The Deemster
- 1890 – The Scapegoat: A Romance
- 1890 – The Prophet, a novella
- 1891 – The Bondman: A New Saga
- 1893 – Cap'n Davey's Honeymoon, The Last Confession, The Blind Mother, 3 novellas published in one volume
- 1894 – The Manxman
- 1894 – The Mahdi: or Love and Race, A Drama in Story
- 1897 – The Christian
- 1901 – The Eternal City
- 1904 – The Prodigal Son
- 1905 – Doña Roma, a novella
- 1906 – Drink: A Love Story on a Great Question
- 1909 – The White Prophet
- 1913 – The Woman Thou Gavest Me
- 1914 – Charlie the Cox: A Life Poem, a short story published as a part of Princess Mary's Gift Book
- 1921 – The Master of Man: The Story of a Sin
- 1923 – The Woman of Knockaloe: A Parable (published in 1927 as Barbed Wire)

=== Plays ===
- 1872 – The Charter
- 1888 – The Prophet, never staged
- 1889 – Good Old Times, with Wilson Barrett
- 1889 – Ben-My-Chree, with Wilson Barrett
- 1890 – Mahomet, never staged
- 1894 – The Demon Lover
- 1896 – Jan the Icelander or Home, Sweet Home, A Lecture Story
- 1898 - The Christian (original version)
- 1901 – The Red Shirt, Suggested by an Incident in the Early Life of Garibaldi
- 1902 – The Eternal City
- 1903 – The Isle of Boy: A Comedy
- 1905 – The Prodigal Son
- 1906 – The Bondman
- 1907 – The Christian (second version)
- 1910 – Pete
- 1910 – The Eternal Question
- 1910 – The Bishop's Son
- 1911 – The Quality of Mercy
- 1916 – The Prime Minister
- 1916 – The Iron Hand, one-act play

=== Films ===
- 1914 – The Christian, scenario
- 1918 – Victory and Peace
- 1920 – Darby and Joan
- 1923 – The Christian, intertitles

=== Non-fiction ===
- 1877 – Richard III and Macbeth: The Spirit of Romantic Play in Relationship to the Principles of Greek and of Gothic Art, and to the Picturesque Interpretations of Mr. Henry Irving : a Dramatic Study
- 1879 – The Supernatural in Shakspere
- 1879 – The Poetry of Dante Rossetti
- 1880 – The Supernatural Element in Poetry
- 1880 – Politics & Art
- 1882 – Sonnets of three centuries: a selection including many examples hitherto unpublished. An anthology edited by Caine
- 1882 – Recollections of Dante Gabriel Rossetti
- 1883 – Cobwebs of Criticism: A Review of the First Reviewers of the 'Lake', 'Satanic', and 'Cockney' School
- 1887 – Life of Samuel Taylor Coleridge
- 1891 – Mary Magdalene: The New Apocrypha
- 1891 – The Little Manx Nation
- 1892 – Scenes on the Russian Frontier
- 1894 – The Little Man Island: Scenes and Specimen Days in the Isle of Man, a guide to the island
- 1905 – The Queen's Christmas Carol, an anthology edited by Caine, for the queen's charities
- 1906 – My Story, an autobiography
- 1908 – Queen Alexandra's Christmas Gift Book, an anthology edited by Caine
- 1908 – My story
- 1909 – Why I wrote The White Prophet
- 1910 – King Edward: A Prince and a Great Man
- 1914 – King Albert's Book, a tribute to the Belgian King and people
- 1915 – The Drama of 365 Days: Scenes in the Great War
- 1916 – Our Girls: Their Work for the War
- 1916 – Address on Policemanship
- 1928 – Recollections of Rossetti, an expanded version of the earlier book
- 1938 – Life of Christ, published posthumously

Caine wrote countless articles and stories of which an account has never been kept.

== Filmography ==
- 1911 – The Christian, based on the play. Directed by Franklyn Barrett in Australia. 28 minutes
- 1914 – The Christian, based on the play and the novel. Directed by Frederick A. Thomson in USA.
- 1915 – The Eternal City, based on the play and the novel. Directed by Hugh Ford and Edwin S. Porter in USA. 120 minutes
- 1915 – The Christian, based on the novel. Directed by George Loane Tucker in UK. 120 minutes
- 1916 – The Bondman, based on the novel. Directed by Edgar Lewis in USA.
- 1916 – The Manxman, based on the novel. Directed by George Loane Tucker in UK. 90 minutes
- 1917 – The Deemster, based on the novel (also known as The Bishop's Son). Directed by Howell Hansel in USA.
- 1917 – The Red Samson, based on the novel The Bondman. Directed by Michael Curtiz in Hungary. 90 minutes
- 1918 – Victory and Peace. Directed by Herbert Brenon in UK.
- 1919 – The Woman Thou Gavest Me, based on the novel. Directed by Hugh Ford in USA. 60 minutes
- 1920 – Darby and Joan, based on the novella. Directed by Percy Nash in GB. 180 minutes
- 1923 – The Christian, based on the play and the novel. Directed by Maurice Tourneur in USA. 80 minutes
- 1923 – The Prodigal Son, based on the novel. Directed by A. E. Coleby in UK and Iceland. 280 minutes
- 1923 – The Eternal City, based on the novel. Directed by George Fitzmaurice in USA. 80 minutes
- 1924 – Name the Man, based on the novel The Master of Man: the Story of a Sin. Directed by Victor Sjöström in USA. 80 minutes
- 1927 – Barbed Wire, based on the novel The Woman of Knockaloe, a Parable. Directed by Rowland V. Lee in USA. 67 minutes
- 1929 – The Bondman, based on the novel. Directed by Herbert Wilcox in UK.
- 1929 – The Manxman, based on the novel. Directed by Alfred Hitchcock in UK. 90 minutes.
