= She's All the World to Me =

1885 novel by Hall Caine

She's All The World To Me
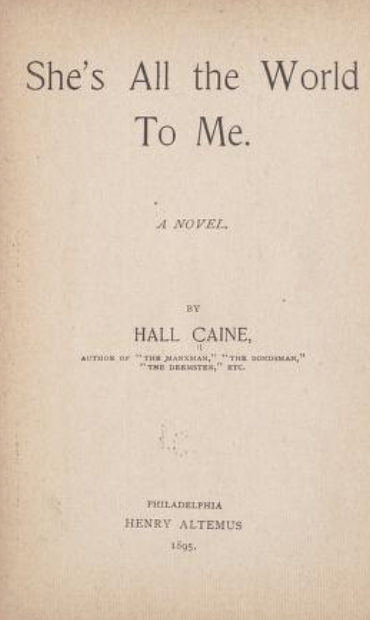
- Title page for She's All the World to Me (1895 edition)
- Author: Hall Caine
- Language: English
- Published: 1885
- Publisher: Harper & Brothers
- Media type: Print (paperback)
- Pages: 136 pp

She's All The World To Me is a short early novel by Hall Caine published in 1885 by Harper & Brothers. The novel was the first of Caine's works to be set on the Isle of Man and it centered on themes that would become integral to his later novels: a love triangle, secret mounting sins and eventual redemption. It was published only in America due to copyright problems, but Caine was subsequently able to reuse a great deal of its material in later novels, notably in The Deemster.

== Plot ==
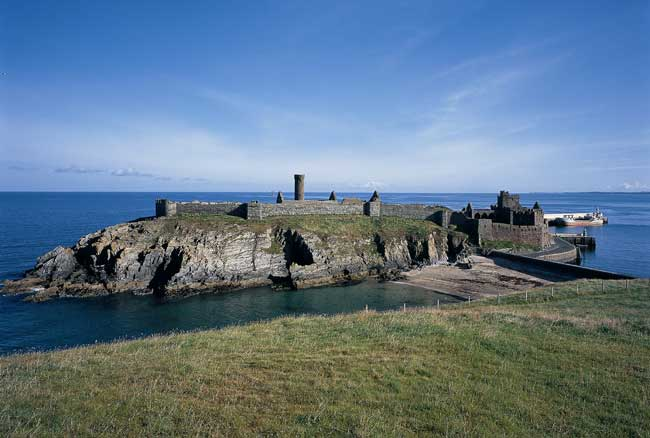
Peel Castle, a key location throughout the novel

Danny Fayle, a young fisherman in Peel, is too shy to make much of his love for Mona Cregeen, a skilled machinist at the town's net factory. Mona lives with her mother and apparent young sister, Ruby, having moved to Peel from elsewhere on the island not long before. Mona has had a secret relationship with Christian Mylrea, the son of the well-respected MHK, Harbour Commissioner and magistrate, Evan Mylrea "Balladhoo". Mona and Christian keep their connection a secret as he tries to keep the debt incurred during his lax life in England from becoming known to his father. In order to try and pay off the debt, Christian falls in with the crew of Danny Fayle's boat who, independently of Danny, plan to wreck a boat on the rocks off Peel Castle. The plot is thwarted by the police but, for the sake of Christian's freedom, Mona enables the men to escape arrest. However, their boat becomes stuck on rocks during a storm and Danny Fayle eventually risks his life in order to save Christian and deliver him to Mona.

== Publication and controversy ==
In 1885, Caine was short of money and wanted to gain exposure in America and so submitted She's all the World to Me to be published in New York by Harper & Brothers. It was published in paperback as number thirteen of Harper's Handy Series. Caine had intended to publish the book also in England, but under the poor copyright laws of America at that time, Caine had forfeited the book’s copyright to Harper & Brothers. Because of this, Caine was forced to wipe his hands of the book entirely. She's All The World To Me was serialised in the Liverpool Weekly Mercury between 21 March and 4 April 1885 immediately following the serialisation of The Shadow of a Crime.

The book is not mentioned by name in Caine's autobiography, nor at all in the major early biographical works on him by C. Fred Kenyon (1901) and Samuel Norris (1948). A factor in this erasing of the book from the Hall Caine cannon is the fact that Caine re-used a great deal of the characters, occurrences and plots of the book in his later novels. This is most notable in his subsequent novel, The Deemster, which took the central scenes of She's all the World to Me as the backbone of its own narrative. Unlike the earlier and much shorter book, The Deemster was much better written and came to be a highly successful and acclaimed novel.

== Quotations ==
- "Never fear," she said, "it's not for the woman to blab. No, the world is all for the man, and the law too. Men make the laws and women suffer under them - that's the way of it." (Chapter VI)
- Love is a selfish thing, let us say what we will of it besides. (Chapter X)
- He loved her with all his great, broken, bleeding heart. Her lips quivered. Then the brave, fearless, stainless girl put her quivering lips to his. (Chapter XII)
- Oh, these dead joys, they want the deepest grave. (Chapter XV)
- "I feel less than a man," he said. "Oh, but a hidden sin is a mean thing, father - a dwarfing, petrifying, corroding, unmanly thing." (Chapter XIX)
- "[...] but if there's one thing truer than another, it is that the world wants men. Clever fellows, good fellows, it has ever had in abundance, but in all ages the world's great want has been men." (Chapter XIX)
- "Let people say what they will. In these relations of life the world has always covered its nakedness in the musty rags of its old conventions, and dubbed its clothes morality." (Chapter XX)

== Use of the novel in Hall Caine's later works ==
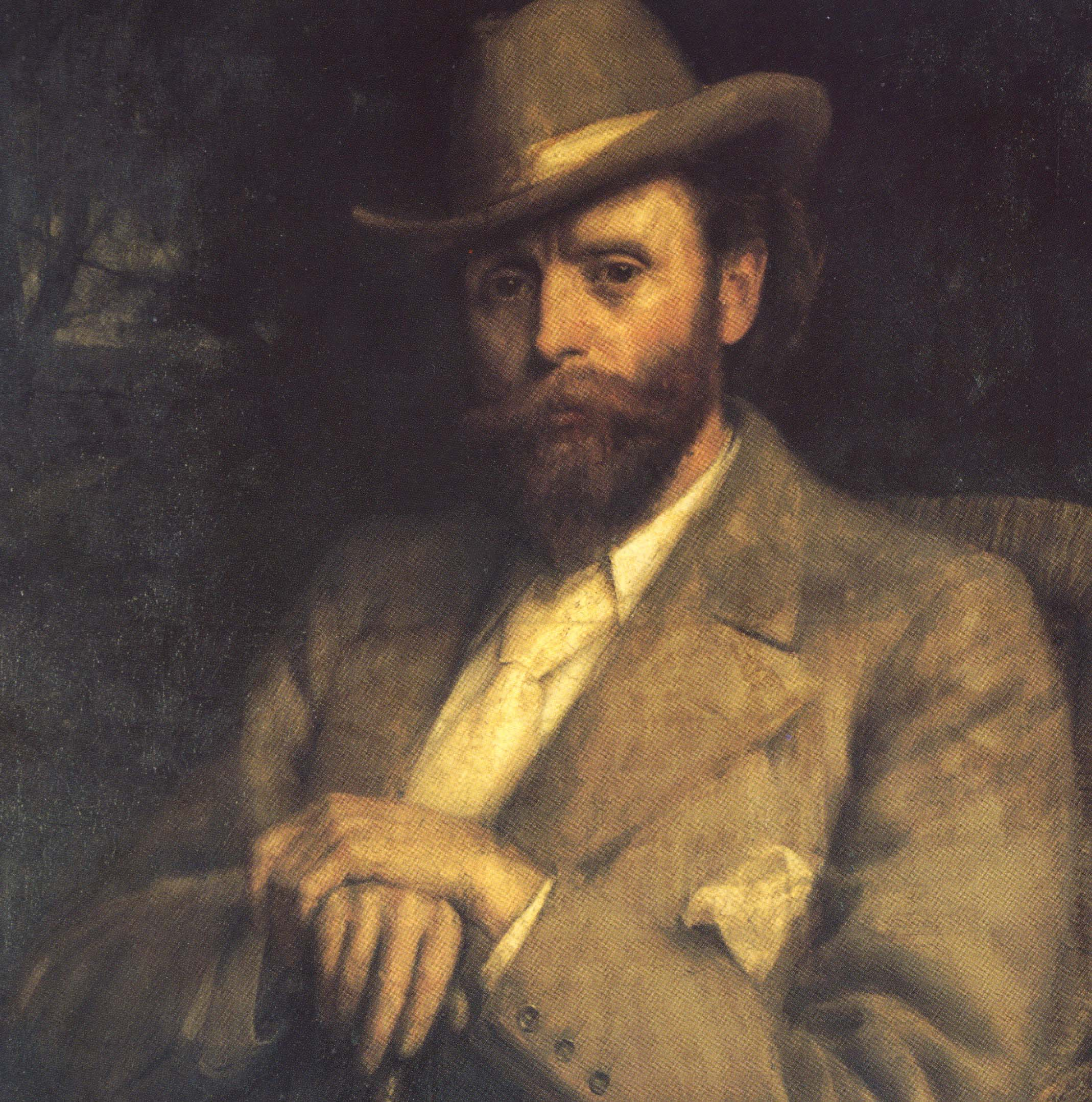
Hall Caine

The following are the main instances of material in She's all the World to Me that Caine used for his later novels:

- The character of Tommy-Bill-beg, a deaf and illiterate man who enjoys singing, and his comic role at the Oiel Verree (Chapter XXI), reappears as Hommy-beg in The Deemster.
- The fishing trip where the bullying of the Danny Fayle leads to Christian calling the crew "skulking cowards" (Chapter VII) reappears as a key scene in The Deemster.
- The fisherman's supper where Christian feels an imposter when he is lauded as the best amongst them (Chapter IX) reappears for Dan Mylrea in The Deemster.
- The episodes where Christian becomes trapped down a mine shaft, and the entire sequence of his escape, reappears almost identically in The Deemster.
- The attempted depositing of Kisseck's murdered body at sea, only to have it float back to shore again (Chapter XVI) reappears as the central scene of The Deemster.
- Mylrea Balladhoo mistaking Kisseck's body washed up on the shore as that of his own son (Chapter XVII) reappears for Bishop Mylrea in The Deemster.
- Mylrea Balladhoo lying to the debt collector in order to cover for his son's forgery of his signature (Chapter XIX) reappears in the same scenario in The Deemster.
- The boat becoming stuck between two rocks in the climax of the novel, with the crew being saved only by someone wading out into the water (Chapter XXII), reappears in Caine’s 1890 novel The Bondman.
