= The Prodigal Son (1923 film) =

1923 film

- Directed by: A. E. Coleby
- Written by: A. E. Coleby
- Based on: The Prodigal Son by Hall Caine
- Starring: Stewart Rome; Henry Victor; Edith Bishop
- Cinematography: D. P. Cooper
- Production company: Stoll Pictures
- Distributed by: Stoll Pictures
- Release date: February 1923
- Running time: 280 minutes
- Country: United Kingdom
- Languages: Silent; English intertitles

The Prodigal Son is a 1923 British silent historical film directed by A. E. Coleby and starring Stewart Rome, Henry Victor and Edith Bishop. The film is an adaptation of Hall Caine's 1904 novel The Prodigal Son, set in Iceland and the French Riviera. It was noted as a long film, reported variously at three or over four hours. The film's original release length as 18,454 feet made it the longest commercially made British film. It was shown in two consecutive parts, the second part being entitled The Return of the Prodigal.

It was shot on location in Iceland, with a final budget of £37,000. The film was not a commercial success on its release, and was attacked by critics. It was perhaps the biggest failure of all the films released by Stoll Pictures, the largest British film company of the early 1920s. However, the film was re-released in 1929 with a greatly reduced running time.

== Plot ==
A marriage is arranged between Magnus Stephenson, son of the Governor of Iceland, and Thora Neilsen, daughter of "the Factor"; but the prospective bridegroom, discovering that Thora loves his brother, Oscar, a budding musician, blackens his own name at the betrothal ceremony by declaring the marriage contract not good enough. Outcast by his family for this apparent dishonour, Magnus paved the way for his younger brother Oscar to marry Thora. Troubles soon arise. Oscar becomes attracted to Helga, his wife's sister, who accompanies the newlywed couple on their honeymoon, and forges his father's signature for a large sum of money to pay his gambling debts at the Casino. Helga's announcement to her sister before the birth of Thora's baby, that Oscar does not love his wife, brings on an illness with homicidal tendencies. Against the wishes of Magnus, who tries prevent it, the baby, Elin, is taken away from the mother, who struggles leave the house to bring the child back and dies in the attempt. Oscar, overcome with remorse, places all his musical compositions on his wife's dead body to be buried with her.

== Cast ==
- Stewart Rome as Magnus Stephenson
- Henry Victor as Oscar Stephenson
- Edith Bishop as Helga Neilson
- Colette Brettel as Thora Neilson / Elin
- Adeline Hayden Coffin as Anna Stephenson
- Frank Wilson as Stephen Stephenson
- Henry Nicholls-Bates as Oscar Neilson
- Louise Conti as Aunt Margaret
- Peter Upcher as Nils Finsen
- Sam Austin as Captain

== Bibliography ==
- Low, Rachael. History of the British Film, 1918-1929. George Allen & Unwin, 1971.
- Gifford, Denis. The British Film Catalogue: 1895-1970. McGraw-Hill, 1973.
- Oakley, Charles. Where We Came In: Seventy Years of the British Film Industry. Routledge, 2013.
- Robertson, Patrick. Movie Facts and Feats: A Guinness Record Book. Sterling Pub Co Inc, 1985, ISBN 978-0-85112-278-6.
