= The Bondman (1916 film) =

1916 film

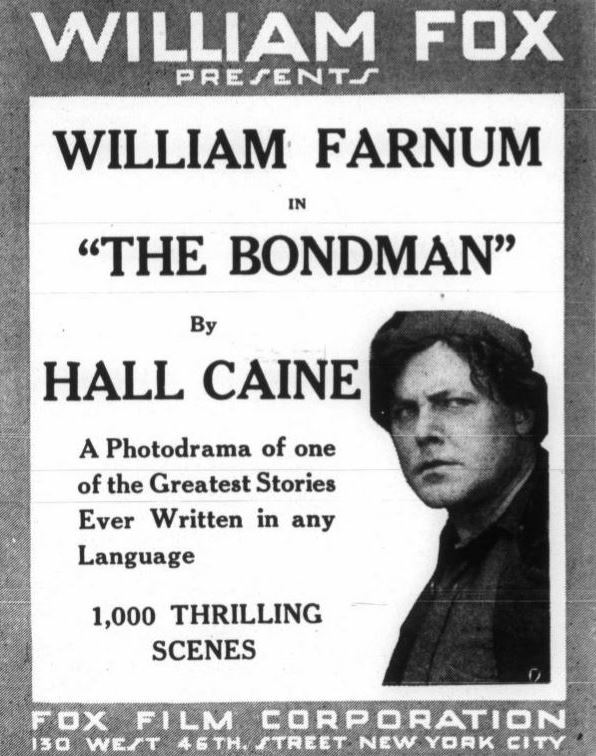
- Advertisement
- Directed by: Edgar Lewis
- Written by: Louise Keller; Edgar Lewis
- Based on: Novel by Hall Caine
- Produced by: Fox Film Corporation
- Starring: William Farnum; L. O. Hart; Dorothy Bernard
- Music by: Max Steiner
- Distributed by: Fox Film Corporation
- Release date: March 20, 1916
- Running time: 6 reels
- Country: United States
- Languages: Silent film (English intertitles)

The Bondman is an American silent film directed by Edgar Lewis and starring William Farnum, L. O. Hart and Dorothy Bernard. The film is an adaptation of Hall Caine's 1890 novel The Bondman.

== Plot ==
The narrative hinges on Jason's vow to wreak vengeance on his father for abandoning his mother. But his father dies, and Jason turns his desire for revenge against Sunlocks, his father's son of another wife. Both Sunlocks and Jason are in love with Greeba, daughter of the governor of the Isle of Man. Sunlocks and Jason go to Iceland, and are confined in prison. Jason not knowing Sunlocks, saves his half-brother from death in the mines. Jason is freed, but Sunlocks is condemned to death. Greeba pleads for Sunlocks' life, and Jason sacrifices himself by taking Sunlocks' place and dying for him.

== Cast ==
- William Farnum as Stephen Orry/Jason Orry
- L. O. Hart as Adam Fairbrother
- Dorothy Bernard as Greeba
- Charles Graham as Jorgen Jorgenson
- Doris Wooldridge as Rachel
- Charles Brook as Danish minister
- Julia Hurley as Stephen Orry's mother
- Carey Lee as Liza Killey
- Harry Spingler as Sunlocks

== Production ==
Produced by the Fox Film Corporation The Bondman was the first film they released under their De Luxe brand. Shooting was done in Maine, on Long Island and in New Jersey. Dorothy Bernard's role as Greba was the biggest that she had up to that point in her career.

During the making of The Bondman William Farnum sustained many narrow escapes from injury. In filming the story he was shown at work as a convict in the sulphur mines where prison guards forced him to drive his pick into a thin crust of volcanic earth resulting in flames and smoke shooting up into the air. The scene was created by using many smoke pots. Farnum as Red Jason made his escape. Carrying Harry Springler over his shoulder he had to fight his way one hundred feet up an almost vertical cliff. Almost reaching the summit both succumbed to the reeking vapour of the Lycopodium contained in the smoke pots.

The 1828 schooner Signal was wrecked in the scene in which Red Jason is wrecked on the rocky coast of the Isle of Man.

Austrian born Max Steiner was a child prodigy, studying composition with Mahler and composing music performed by the Vienna Philharmonic. After travelling to America seventeen year old Steiner became Fox Film's musical director in 1915. At the time there was no specially written music for films and Steiner told William Fox his idea to write an original score for The Bondman. Fox agreed and they put together a 110 piece orchestra to accompany the screenings. The musicians came from William Fox's Circuit of Theatres, Jack Loeb's and others.

== Release ==
It was the intention of the William Fox Film corporation to place The Bondman in special theaters throughout the country at advance prices, but pressure was brought to bear to allow the regular picture theaters to obtain this big film. On the release of the film Hall Caine cabled the New York Times requesting that they inform the American public that the film of his novel and Wilson Barrett's play was taken without his permission. Fox responded that it was public property.

== Preservation ==
The Bondman is currently presumed lost. In February of 2021, the film was cited by the National Film Preservation Board on their Lost U.S. Silent Feature Films list.

== Bibliography ==
- The American Film Institute Catalog, Features Films 1911-1920, University of California Press, 1988 ISBN 0-520-06301-5

== See also ==
- The Red Samson (1917)
- The Bondman (1929)
- 1937 Fox vault fire
