= The Bondman (1929 film) =

1929 British film by Herbert Wilcox

- Directed by: Herbert Wilcox
- Written by: Hall Caine (novel); T.A. Innes
- Produced by: Herbert Wilcox
- Starring: Norman Kerry; Donald Macardle; Henry Vibart
- Cinematography: Freddie Young
- Production company: British & Dominions Film Corporation
- Distributed by: Woolf & Freedman Film Service
- Release date: 21 May 1929 (US)
- Country: United Kingdom
- Languages: Silent; English Intertitles

The Bondman is a 1929 British silent adventure directed by Herbert Wilcox and starring Norman Kerry, Frances Cuyler, and Donald Macardle. It was based on the 1890 novel The Bondman by Hall Caine.

The film was made at Cricklewood Studios. Because it was made as a silent film at a time when sound film was taking over it was only able to secure release as a second feature.

Hall Caine enjoyed the final film.

== Cast ==
- Norman Kerry as Jason
- Frances Cuyler as Greeba Fairbrother
- Donald Macardle as Michael
- Henry Vibart as Father Ferrati
- Harold Saxon-Snell as Testa
- Judd Green as Adam Fairbrother
- Florence Vie as Mrs. Fairbrother
- Edward O'Neill as Father
- Dora Barton as Mother
- Charles Emerald as Captain

== See also ==
- The Bondman (1916)
- The Red Samson (1917)

== Bibliography ==
- Chibnall, Steve. Quota Quickies: The Birth of the British 'B' Film. British Film Institute, 2007.
- Wood, Linda. British Films, 1927-1939. British Film Institute, 1986.
