= The Copyright Association =

The Copyright Association was an English organisation founded in 1872 for "authors, publishers and other persons interested in copyright property", which together with the Society of Authors lobbied Parliament on copyright issues in the decades before the 1911 Copyright Act.

In the early 1870s, English publishers were especially concerned to protect the rights of their authors in Canada, since the Canadian Government was pressing for the right to reprint British works in Canada subject to an excise duty. The Association's Honorary Secretary Frederick Daldy lobbied in Canada on behalf of British publishers and authors and was very influential in thwarting Canadian printers' efforts to establish freedom from Imperial copyright control and compulsory licensing. Such licensing would have allowed Canadian printers to compete on a more even footing with American printers and might have helped to establish a stronger publishing industry in Canada.

The association's initial committee included both authors (including Robert Browning, Arthur Helps, William Smith, Charles Reade and Charles Edward Trevelyan) and publishers (including John Murray (1808-1892), Thomas Longman (1804-1879), Alexander Macmillan, George Bentley (1818-1895) and George Routledge).
