= Michael Curtiz filmography =

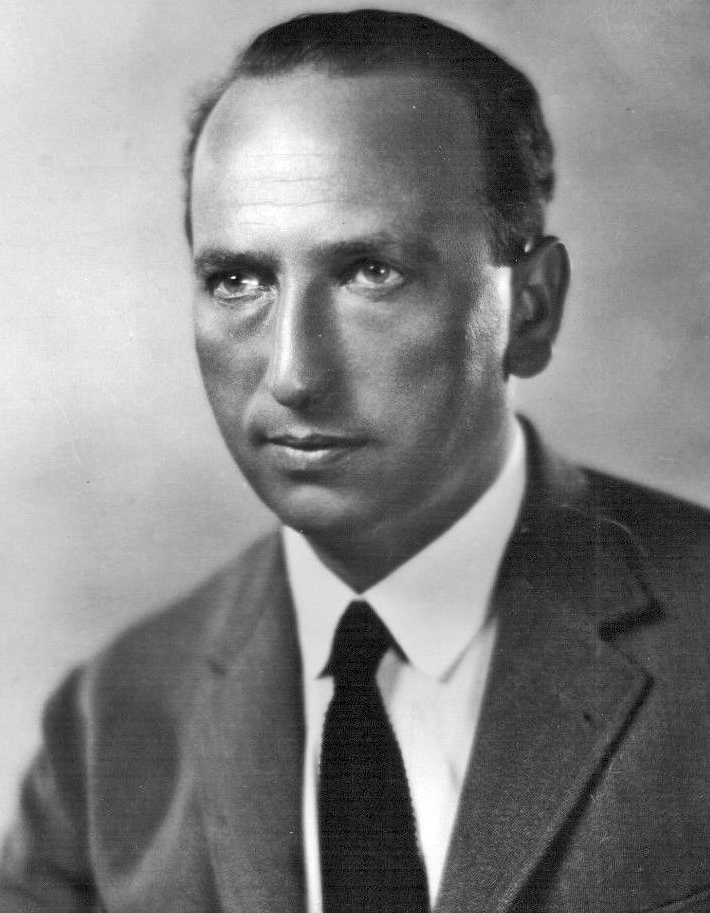
Michael Curtiz in a 1928 portrait

Michael Curtiz (1886–1962) was a Hungarian-born American film director whose career spanned from 1912 to 1961. During this period, he directed 178 films. He began his cinematic career in Hungary, then moved to Austria, and, finally, to the United States. As his biographer, Alan K. Rode, notes, "A cinematic pioneer, Curtiz made a seamless transition from hand-cranking cameras in silent films to directing the first sound feature where the characters spoke their parts. He led the way in two- and three-color Technicolor, directed the first motion-picture produced in VistaVision, and worked extensively in CinemaScope." Rode also notes that "he helmed rousing adventures, westerns, musicals, war movies, romances, historical dramas, horror films, tearjerkers, melodramas, comedies, spectacles, and film noirs".

Born in Budapest, Curtiz graduated from Hungary's Royal Academy of Theatre and Art in 1906. After six years as a stage actor and director, he joined the nascent Hungarian film industry. His first film credit was the 1912 drama, Maés Holnap ("Today and Tomorrow"). In 1913, after directing several films, Curtiz traveled to Denmark to hone his skills as an apprentice for director August Blom. Returning to Hungary, he became a freelance director for several film companies. In 1919, Curtiz emigrated to Vienna and became one of Austria's top film directors. His first film there was Die Dame Mit Dem Schwarzen Handschuh ("The Lady with the Black Gloves", 1919), starring his wife, Lucy Doraine. Among his subsequent Austrian films were the two-part epic Sodom and Gomorrah (1922), and Die Sklavenkönigin ("The Slave Queen", 1924). The latter film was released in the United Kingdom as The Moon of Israel. Harry Warner, one of the founders of Warner Bros., instructed his brother, Jack, to view the film. After doing so, they were impressed enough to offer Curtiz a contract to direct in the United States. (Note: Paramount Pictures bought the rights to Moon of Israel, and held up its American release until 1927. Jack and Harry Warner were able to unearth a print of the film, and, after seeing it, offered Curtiz a contract.)

In 1926, Curtiz began his American career with The Third Degree, starring Dolores Costello. He followed this with several more films starring her, including the part-talking biblical epic Noah's Ark (1928). In 1932 and 1933, respectively, Curtiz directed the two-color Technicolor horror films Doctor X and Mystery of the Wax Museum, both starring Lionel Atwill and Fay Wray. In 1935, Curtiz directed the swashbuckling adventure Captain Blood, which made major stars of Errol Flynn and Olivia de Havilland. He followed this with several more adventure films starring them, including The Charge of the Light Brigade (1936), The Adventures of Robin Hood (1938), and Dodge City (1939), and Flynn in The Sea Hawk (1940). During this period, Curtiz also made the gangster films Kid Galahad (1937), starring Edward G. Robinson, Bette Davis, and Humphrey Bogart , Angels with Dirty Faces (1938) with James Cagney and Bogart, and the dramatic film Four Daughters (1938), which brought stardom to John Garfield. In 1941, Curtiz directed Robinson and Garfield in The Sea Wolf. During the war years (1941–1945), Curtiz directed James Cagney and Joan Crawford into Academy Award-winning performances with Yankee Doodle Dandy (1942) and Mildred Pierce (1945). Between these, Curtiz directed his magnum opus Casablanca (1942), with Humphrey Bogart and Ingrid Bergman, which won the Academy Award for Best Picture and Curtiz's only Academy Award for Best Director.

In the post-war years, Curtiz directed Life with Father (1947), an adaptation of a popular Broadway play and the film noir The Unsuspected (1948), his first film by his own production company. For his company, he also produced and directed Romance on the High Seas (1948), a musical which marked the film debut of Doris Day. Curtiz eventually disbanded his company and remained a contract director with Warner Bros. until 1954. Among his later films under his Warners contract was another film noir, The Breaking Point, starring John Garfield. After leaving Warner Bros., Curtiz directed White Christmas (1954) for Paramount Pictures, the first film in VistaVision and the highest-grossing film of his career. Also for Paramount, Curtiz directed the Elvis Presley vehicle, King Creole (1958). In 1961, he directed his final film, The Comancheros with John Wayne.

For his contribution to cinema, Curtiz was awarded a star on the Hollywood Walk of Fame. In the 1998 and 2007 listings of the American Film Institute's Greatest American Films, Casablanca ranked in second and third place respectively while Yankee Doodle Dandy ranked 100 on the first list and 98 on the second. As of 2025, five films directed by Curtiz have been added to the National Film Registry: The Adventures of Robin Hood, Casablanca, Mildred Pierce, Yankee Doodle Dandy, and Angels with Dirty Faces.

== Filmography ==
The filmography of Michael Curtiz is derived from the one presented in the biography by Alan K. Rode.

=== Hungarian films: 1912–1913 ===
Michael Curtiz was born Mano Kaminer in Budapest in 1886. In 1906, he graduated from Hungary's Royal Academy of Theatre and Art. Under the stage name of Mihály Kertész, he established himself as a stage actor, performing in classical and modern theatrical dramas. Eventually, he turned to director as well. In 1912, Kertész entered Hungary's motion picture industry, as an actor and director for the Projectograph Film Company. His first film for them was also the company's initial feature. All of Curtiz's films from this period are lost.

Hungarian films: 1912–1913
Year	Title		Function		Notes	Ref.
Year	Original	English translation	Director	Other	Notes	Ref.
1912	Ma és holnap	"Today and Tomorrow"	Yes	Yes	Projectograph Production; Curtiz wrote the screenplay for this film, and also played a supporting role	
1913	Krausz doktor a vérpadon	"Doctor Krausz on the Scaffold"	Yes		Projectograph Production; a "sketch film" (Note: A sketch film was a short film that was presented as part of a live stage performance.)	
1913	Gyerünk csak	"Come On"	Yes		Projectograph Production; a "sketch film"	
1913	Házasodik az uram	"My Husband's Getting Married"	Yes		Projectograph Production; a "sketch film"	

=== Danish film: 1913 ===
In July 1913, Kertész left Hungary, and travelled to Denmark to train as a film director. There, he went to work for the Nordisk Film Company, as an assistant director to August Blom.

Danish film: 1913
Year	Title	Function		Notes	Ref.
Year	Title	Director	Other	Notes	Ref.
1913	Atlantis		Yes	Nordisk Films Kompagni Production (Denmark); directed by August Blom; Curtiz played a supporting role in the film, and was also an assistant director; prints survive	

=== Hungarian films: 1914–1919 ===
After six months in Denmark, Mihály Kertész returned to Hungary. There, he returned as a film director, alternating between the Projectograph, Uher, and Kino-Riport companies. With the coming of World War I in 1914, Kertész was called up by the Austro-Hungarian army, and served as an artillery officer. After being discharged in 1915, he resumed film-making, and married actress Lucy Doraine, who would star in several of his films. In 1917, a new film company, Phönix-Film, was formed by the merger of Projectagraph and Star-Film Productions. Kertész served as their head of production until 1919. Except where noted, all of the films from this period are lost.

Hungarian films: 1914–1919
Year	Title		Function		Notes	Ref.
Year	Original	English translation	Director	Other	Notes	Ref.
1913	Mozikirály	"Movie King"	Yes		Projectograph Production; features Sári Fedák; a "sketch film"	
1913	Az Utolsó Bohém	"The Last Bohemian"	Yes		Projectograph Production; a "sketch film"	
1913	Rablélek	"Captive Souls"	Yes		Projectograph Production; features Sári Fedák	
1914	Az Aranyásó	"The Golddigger"	Yes		A "sketch film"; scenario by Ferenc Molnár; loosely based on a story by Bret Harte	
1914	A Hercegnó Pongtolája	"The Princess in a Nightrobe"	Yes		Kino-Riport Production; "sketch film"	
1914	Az Éjzaka Katona	"Prisoner of the Night"	Yes	Yes	Projectograph Production; Curtiz acted in this film, and wrote the screenplay, as well as directed	
1914	A Szökött Katona	"The Escaped Soldier"	Yes		Miklỏs Pảstory Production; screenplay by Miklós Pásztory	
1914	A Kölcsönkért Csecsemök	"The Borrowed Babies"	Yes		Jenő Janovics Production; based on the stage play Baby Mine by Margaret Mayo	
1914	A Tolonc	"The Undesirable"	Yes		Jenő Janovics Production; with Lili Berky and Victor Varconi; prints survive (Note: The Undesirable has been released on blu-ray by Olive Films.)	
1914	Bánk Bán	"Bánk the Regent"	Yes		Jenő Janovics Production; based on the play by Ferenc Erkel	
1914	Sarga Liliom	"Yellow Lily"		Yes	Directed by Fẻlix Vanyl; Curtiz played a supporting role in this film	
1915	A Paradicsom	"The Tomato"	Yes		Projectograph Production; a "sketch film"	
1915	Akit Ketten Szeretnek	"One Who Is Loved By Two"	Yes	Yes	Projectograph Production; a "sketch film"; Curtiz starred, as well as directed	
1915	Cox És Box	"Cox and Box"		Yes	Proja Films; directed by Márton Garas; Curtiz played a supporting role in this film	
1916	A Bánat Assonya	"Melancholy Lady"	Yes	Yes	Screenplay by Curtiz	
1916	Makkhetes	"Seven of Spades"	Yes		Kino-Riport Production	
1916	A Karthausi	"The Carthusians"	Yes		Star-Film Production	
1916	A Doktor Úr	"Mr. Doctor"	Yes		Kino-Riport Production; based on a play by Ferenc Molnár	
1916	Az Ezüst Kecske	"The Medic"	Yes		Kino-Riport Production; based on a novel by Sándor Bródy	
1916	A Farkas	"The Wolf"	Yes	Yes	Kino-Riport Production; with Victor Varconi and Lucy Doraine; screenplay by Curtiz and Ladislaus Vajda	
1916	A Fekete Szivárvány	"The Black Rainbow"	Yes		Kino-Riport Production; with Vilma Medgyaszay	
1916	A Magyar Föld Ereje	"The Strength of the Fatherland"	Yes		A propaganda film for the Hungarian Red Cross	
1916	Károly és Zita királyné koronázása Budapesten	"The Coronation of King Charles IV and Queen Zita in Budapest"		Yes	A depiction of the coronation of the last Habsburg monarchs; Curtiz may have directed this film, and is seen filming a parade; prints survive	
1917	Halálcsengö	"The Death-Bell"	Yes		Star-Film Production	
1917	Zoárd Mester	"Master Zoard"	Yes	Yes	Phönix-Film Production; screenplay by Curtiz	
1917	Tatárjárás	"Tartar Invasion"	Yes	Yes	Glória-Film Production; screenplay by Curtiz; a four-minute fragment survives	
1917	Az Árendás Zsidó	"Jean the Tenant"	Yes		Phönix-Film Production	
1917	A Kuruzsló	"The Charlatan"	Yes		Phönix-Film Production; based on a play by Imre Földes; remade by Curtiz as Namenlos ("Nameless", 1923) and Alias the Doctor (1933)	
1917	A Senki Fia	"Nobody's Son"	Yes		Phönix-Film Production	
1917	A Szentjóbi Erdö Titka	"Secret of St. Job Forest"	Yes		Phönix-Film Production; features Dezső Kertész (a.k.a. David Curtiz), the brother of Michael Curtiz	
1917	Az Utolsó Hajnal	"The Last Dawn"	Yes		Phönix-Film Production; based on a novel by Alfred Deutsch-German; prints survive (Note: The Last Dawn has been preserved by the EYE Film Institute Netherlands.)	
1917	A Föld Embere	"The Man Of The Earth"	Yes		Phönix-Film Production; with Oscar Beregi	
1917	A Vörös Sámson	"The Red Samson"	Yes		Phönix-Film Production; with Tivadar Uray	
1917	A Béke Útja	"Peace's Road"	Yes		Phönix-Film Production; short film	
1918	Tavasz A Télben	"Spring in Winter"	Yes		Phönix-Film Production	
1918	A Csúnya Fiú	"The Ugly Boy"	Yes		Phönix-Film Production	
1918	Egy Krajcár Története	"The Story Of A Kreutzer"	Yes		Phönix-Film Production	
1918	Az Ezredes	"The Colonel"	Yes		Phönix-Film Production; with Bela Lugosi	
1918	Lulu	"Lulu"	Yes		Phönix-Film Production; with Bela Lugosi	
1918	99	"99"	Yes		Phönix-Film Production; with Victor Varconi and Bela Lugosi	
1918	Az Ördög	"The Devil"	Yes		Phönix-Film Production; with Victor Varconi; from a story by Ferenc Molnár	
1918	A Skorpió I	"The Scorpion, Part I"	Yes		Phönix-Film Production; with Victor Varconi	
1918	A Skorpió II	"The Scorpion, Part II"	Yes		Phönix-Film Production; with Victor Varconi; a three-minute excerpt survives	
1918	Júdás	"The Judas"	Yes		Phönix-Film Production; with Leopold Kramer	
1918	Gróf Monte Cristo	"The Count Of Monte Cristo"	Yes		Phönix-Film Production; based on the novel by Alexandre Dumas; unfinished film	
1918	Ocskay Brigadéros	"The Ocksay Brigadier"	Yes		Phönix-Film Production; with Victor Varconi; based on a story by Ferenc Herczeg; unfinished film	
1918	A Napraforgós Hölgy	"The Sunflower Woman"	Yes		Phönix-Film Production; with Lucy Doraine; unfinished film	
1918	Varázskeringö	"Magic Waltz"	Yes	Yes	Semper Films Production; with Victor Varconi; screenplay by Curtiz	
1918	Lu, A Kokott	"Lu, the Coquette"	Yes	Yes	Semper Films Production; screenplay by Curtiz	
1918	A Víg Özvegy	"The Merry Widow"	Yes	Yes	Semper Films Production; with Victor Varconi; screenplay by Curtiz; based on the operetta by Franz Lehár	
1919	Alraune	"Alraune"	Yes		Phönix-Film Production	
1919	Jön az öcsém	"My Brother Is Coming"	Yes		A short film with Oscar Beregi and Lucy Doraine; prints survive	
1919	Liliom	"Liliom"	Yes		Based on the play by Ferenc Molnár; unfinished when Curtiz left Budapest for Vienna	

=== Austrian films: 1919–1926 ===
In 1919, a communist government was established for a brief time in Hungary. This prompted Kertész to migrate to Austria, where he began working for the Sascha-Film Company. By the end of 1920, he had established himself as the company's top director. As in Hungary, his wife, Lucy Doraine, appeared in several of his Austrian films. They divorced in 1923. Except where noted, the films from this period survive, and were made for the Sascha-Film Company.

Austrian films: 1919–1926
Year	Title		Function		Notes	Ref.
Year	Original	English translation	Director	Other	Notes	Ref.
1919	Die Dame Mit Dem Schwarzen Handschuh	"The Lady with the Black Gloves"	Yes	Yes	With Lucy Doraine; screenplay by Curtiz; lost	
1919	Boccaccio	"Boccaccio"	Yes		With Paul Lukas; lost	
1920	Der Stern Von Damaskus	"The Star of Damascus"	Yes	Yes	With Lucy Doraine; screenplay by Curtiz; lost	
1920	Die Gottesgeißel	"The Scourge of God"	Yes	Yes	With Lucy Doraine; screenplay by Curtiz; sequel to The Star of Damascus; lost	
1920	Die Dame Mit Den Sonnenblumen	"The Sunflower Lady"	Yes	Yes	With Lucy Doraine; screenplay by Curtiz; lost	
1920	Mrs. Tutti Frutti	"Mrs. Tutti Frutti"	Yes		With Lucy Doraine	
1920	Cherchez La Femme!	"Look For The Woman"	Yes		With Lucy Doraine	
1921	Frau Dorothys Bekenntnis	"Madame Dorothy's Confession"	Yes		With Lucy Doraine	
1921	Labyrinth Des Grauen	"Labyrinth of Horror"	Yes		With Lucy Doraine	
1921	Drakula halála	"The Death of Dracula"		Yes	Lapa Studios / Corvin Studios; directed Károly Lajthay; David Curtiz (brother of Michael Curtiz) has a supporting role; screenplay by Curtiz; based on the novel by Bram Stoker; lost	
1922	Sodom Und Gomorrah Part I: Die Sünde Part II: Die Strafe	"Sodom and Gomorrah" Part I:"The Sin" Part II: "The Punishment"	Yes	Yes	Screenplay by Ladislaus Vajda and Curtiz; with Lucy Doraine, Walter Slezak, and Victor Varconi; an epic film shown in two parts	
1922	Harun al Raschid	"Harun al-Rashid"	Yes		A co-production of Sascha-Film (Austria)	
1922	Samson und Delila	"Samson and Delilah"		Yes	Vita-Film Production; produced by Alexander Korda; with María Corda; Curtiz is credited as costume designer (Note: Actually, Curtiz loaned the costumes from Sodom and Gomorrah to this production.)	
1923	Der Junge Medardus	"Young Medardus"	Yes		with Victor Varconi; screenplay by Ladislaus Vajda	
1923	Die Lawine	"Avalanche"	Yes		With Victor Varconi and Mary Kid; screenplay by Ladislaus Vajda	
1923	Namenlos	"Nameless"	Yes		With Victor Varconi and Mary Kid; screenplay by Ladislaus Vajda; a remake of Curtiz's The Charlatan; filmed again by him as Alias the Doctor (1932); lost	
1924	Ein Spiel Ums Leben	"A Deadly Game"	Yes		With Mary Kid; lost	
1924	General Babka	"General Babka"	Yes		"No information available"	
1924	Die Sklavenkönigin	"The Slave Queen"	Yes		A co-production of Sascha-Film (Austria) and Stoll Pictures (England); with María Corda; based on the novel by H. Rider Haggard; released in the United States as Moon of Israel	
1925	Das Spielzeug von Paris	"The Toy of Paris"	Yes	Yes	With Lili Damita; screenplay by Curtiz; based on a novel by Margery Lawrence; released in the United States as Red Heels	
1926	Fiaker Nr. 13	"Cab No. 13"	Yes		With Lili Damita	
1926	Der Goldene Schmetterling	"The Golden Butterfly"	Yes		With Lili Damita and Nils Asther; released in the United States as The Road to Happiness	

=== American films – the Warner Bros. years: 1926–1953 ===
In 1926, Mihály Kertész accepted an offer from Warner Bros. to come to the United States, and direct films. He arrived that June, and anglicized his name to Michael Curtiz. He would remain at Warners for 28 years. During that time, he directed 87 films, married screenwriter Bess Meredyth in 1929, and became an American citizen in 1936. Except where indicated, all of Curtiz's Warner Bros. films survive.

American films – the Warner Bros. years: 1926–1953
Year	Title	Function		Notes	Ref.
Year	Title	Director	Other	Notes	Ref.
1926	The Third Degree	Yes		With Dolores Costello and Jason Robards; based on a play by Charles Klein; previously filmed in 1913 and 1919	
1927	A Million Bid	Yes		With Dolores Costello, Warner Oland, Malcolm McGregor	
1927	The Desired Woman	Yes		With Irene Rich, William Russell, and William Collier Jr.; screenplay by Darryl F. Zanuck; lost film	
1927	Good Time Charley	Yes		With Helene Costello, Warner Oland, and Clyde Cook	
1928	Tenderloin	Yes		With Dolores Costello, Conrad Nagel, George E. Stone; story by "Melville Crossman"; part-talking; lost film	
1928	Noah's Ark	Yes		With Dolores Costello, George O'Brien, Noah Beery, Guinn Williams, and Myrna Loy; screenplay by Darryl F. Zanuck	
1929	Glad Rag Doll	Yes		With Dolores Costello, Ralph Graves, and Audrey Ferris; all-talking film; lost film	
1929	Madonna of Avenue A	Yes		With Dolores Costello, Grant Withers, Douglas Gerrard; part-talking; lost film	
1929	The Gamblers	Yes		With H. B. Warner, Lois Wilson, Jason Robards; lost film	
1929	Hearts in Exile	Yes		With Dolores Costello, Grant Withers, James Kirkwood; all-talkie; an alternate ending was shot for the film's European release; lost film	
1930	Mammy	Yes		With Al Jolson, Lois Moran, Louise Dresser, Lowell Sherman; based on an unproduced play by Irving Berlin and James Gleason; part-Technicolor (Note: The Technicolor footage survives incomplete.)	
1930	Under a Texas Moon	Yes		With Frank Fay, Raquel Torres, Myrna Loy, Noah Beery; filmed in Technicolor	
1930	The Matrimonial Bed	Yes		With Frank Fay, Lilyan Tashman, James Gleason	
1930	Bright Lights	Yes		With Dorothy Mackaill, Frank Fay, Noah Beery; filmed in Technicolor (Note: Bright Lights survives complete in black and white prints. Only fragments of the Technicolor footage survive.)	
1930	River's End	Yes		With Charles Bickford, Evalyn Knapp, J. Farrell MacDonald; based on a novel by James Oliver Curwood (Note: Previously filmed in 1920; remade in 1940)	
1930	A Soldier's Plaything	Yes		With Lotti Loder, Harry Langdon, Ben Lyon; filmed in the Vitascope wide-screen process, but released in standard 35mm	
1931	Dämon des Meers ["Demon of the Sea"]	Yes		With Wilhelm Dieterle; a German-language version of Moby Dick, directed by Lloyd Bacon and starring John Barrymore	
1931	God's Gift to Women	Yes		With Frank Fay, Laura La Plante, Joan Blondell	
1931	The Mad Genius	Yes		With John Barrymore, Marian Marsh, Charles Butterworth, Boris Karloff	
1932	The Woman from Monte Carlo	Yes		With Lil Dagover, Walter Huston, Warren William	
1932	Alias the Doctor	Yes		With Richard Barthelmess, Marian Marsh, Norman Foster; previously filmed by Curtiz as The Charlatan (1917) and Nameless (1923) (Note: A French-language version of Alias the Doctor, titled Le Cas de Docteur Brenner ["The Case of Dr. Brenner"], was also produced in 1932.)	
1932	The Strange Love of Molly Louvain	Yes		With Ann Dvorak, Lee Tracy, Richard Cromwell	
1932	Doctor X	Yes		With Lionel Atwill, Fay Wray, Lee Tracy; filmed in Technicolor (Note: A black and white version was also filmed.)	
1932	The Cabin in the Cotton	Yes		With Richard Barthelmess, Dorothy Jordan, Bette Davis; based on a novel by Harry Harrison Kroll (Note: This is the film where Bette Davis says, "I'd love to kiss ya, but I just washed my hair".)	
1932	20,000 Years in Sing Sing	Yes		With Spencer Tracy, Bette Davis; based on the book by Lewis E. Lawes (Note: Remade as Castle on the Hudson in 1940 and directed by Anatole Litvak)	
1933	Mystery of the Wax Museum	Yes		With Lionel Atwill, Fay Wray, Glenda Farrell, Frank McHugh; filmed in Technicolor (Note: Remade in 3D as House of Wax (1953), directed by Andre DeToth)	
1933	The Keyhole	Yes		With Kay Francis, George Brent, Glenda Farrell	
1933	Private Detective 62	Yes		With William Powell, Margaret Lindsay, Ruth Donnelly	
1933	The Mayor of Hell		Yes	Directed by Archie Mayo; with James Cagney, Madge Evans, Arthur Byron; Curtiz directed ten hours of retakes on this film	
1933	Goodbye Again	Yes		With Warren William, Joan Blondell, Genevieve Tobin (Note: Remade as Honeymoon for Three, directed by Lloyd Bacon)	
1933	The Kennel Murder Case	Yes		With William Powell (as Philo Vance), Mary Astor, Eugene Pallette; based on the novel by S. S. Van Dine	
1933	Female	Yes		With Ruth Chatterton, George Brent, Lois Wilson; originally begun with William Dieterle directing; William A. Wellman took over for a while when Dieterle became ill, then Curtiz took over when Wellman was assigned to directing College Coach	
1934	Mandalay	Yes		With Kay Francis, Ricardo Cortez, Warner Oland	
1934	Jimmy the Gent	Yes		With James Cagney, Bette Davis, Allen Jenkins	
1934	The Key	Yes		With William Powell, Edna Best, Colin Clive	
1934	British Agent	Yes		With Leslie Howard, Kay Francis, William Gargan; based on a book by R. H. Bruce Lockhart	
1935	Black Fury	Yes		With Paul Muni, Karen Morley, William Gargan; based on a short story by Michael Musmanno	
1935	The Case of the Curious Bride	Yes		With Warren William (as Perry Mason), Margaret Lindsay, Donald Woods, Claire Dodd; based on the novel by Erle Stanley Gardner; Errol Flynn has a small role in this film	
1935	Go Into Your Dance		Yes	Directed by Archie Mayo; with Al Jolson, Ruby Keeler, Glenda Farrell; Curtiz directed six scenes in this film, along with some retakes	
1935	Front Page Woman	Yes		With Bette Davis, George Brent, Roscoe Karns; based on a short story by Richard Macaulay	
1935	Little Big Shot	Yes		With Sybil Jason, Glenda Farrell, Robert Armstrong, Edward Everett Horton	
1935	Captain Blood	Yes		With Errol Flynn, Olivia de Havilland, Lionel Atwill, Basil Rathbone, Guy Kibbee; based on the novel Captain Blood: His Odyssey by Rafael Sabatini (Note: Previously filmed in 1923, directed by David Smith.)	
1936	The Walking Dead	Yes		With Boris Karloff, Ricardo Cortez, Edmund Gwenn, Marguerite Churchill	
1936	Anthony Adverse		Yes	Directed by Mervyn LeRoy; with Fredric March, Olivia de Havilland, Donald Woods, Claude Rains, Gale Sondergaard; based on the novel by Hervey Allen; Curtiz directed the opening sequence	
1936	The Charge of the Light Brigade	Yes		With Errol Flynn, Olivia de Havilland, Patric Knowles; based on the poem by Alfred, Lord Tennyson	
1937	Black Legion		Yes	Directed by Archie Mayo; with Humphrey Bogart, Dick Foran, Erin O'Brien-Moore; Curtiz directed some additional scenes, two months after principal production had ended	
1937	Stolen Holiday	Yes		With Kay Francis, Claude Rains, Ian Hunter	
1937	Marked Woman		Yes	Directed by Lloyd Bacon; with Bette Davis, Humphrey Bogart, Lola Lane; Curtiz finished this film when Lloyd Bacon went on his honeymoon	
1937	Mountain Justice	Yes		With Josephine Hutchinson, George Brent, Guy Kibbee; loosely based on the true story of Edith Maxwell	
1937	Kid Galahad	Yes		With Edward G. Robinson, Bette Davis, Humphrey Bogart, Wayne Morris, Harry Carey; based on a story by Francis Wallace (Note: Remade as Kid Galahad (1962), starring Elvis Presley; The Wagons Roll at Night, starring Humphrey Bogart, was also based on the Wallace story.)	
1937	The Perfect Specimen	Yes		With Errol Flynn, Joan Blondell, Hugh Herbert	
1938	Gold Is Where You Find It	Yes		With George Brent, Olivia de Havilland, Claude Rains, Tim Holt; based on a novel by Clements Ripley; filmed in Technicolor	
1938	The Adventures of Robin Hood	Yes		Co-directed with William Keighley; with Errol Flynn, Olivia de Havilland, Basil Rathbone, Claude Rains, Alan Hale, Eugene Pallette, Patric Knowles; Curtiz replaced Keighley as the film's director; filmed in Technicolor (Note: Numerous films have been made about Robin Hood, among them in 1922, 1952, 1976, and 1991.)	
1938	Four's a Crowd	Yes		With Errol Flynn, Olivia de Havilland, Rosalind Russell, Patric Knowles	
1938	Four Daughters	Yes		With Claude Rains, Jeffrey Lynn, John Garfield; based on a short story by Fannie Hurst (Note: Remade as Young at Heart with Doris Day and Frank Sinatra)	
1938	Angels with Dirty Faces	Yes		With James Cagney, Pat O'Brien, Humphrey Bogart, Ann Sheridan (Note: Warner Bros. produced a sequel, Angels Wash Their Faces (1939).)	
1939	Blackwell's Island		Yes	Directed by William McGann; with John Garfield, Rosemary Lane, Dick Purcell; Curtiz directed some retakes, and added some scenes	
1939	Dodge City	Yes		With Errol Flynn, Olivia de Havilland, Ann Sheridan; filmed in Technicolor	
1939	Sons of Liberty	Yes		Short film; with Claude Rains, Gale Sondergaard; filmed in Technicolor	
1939	Daughters Courageous	Yes		With John Garfield, Claude Rains, Jeffrey Lynn	
1939	The Private Lives of Elizabeth and Essex	Yes		With Bette Davis, Errol Flynn, Olivia de Havilland, Donald Crisp, Alan Hale, Vincent Price; based on the play Elizabeth the Queen by Maxwell Anderson; filmed in Technicolor	
1939	Four Wives	Yes		With Priscilla Lane, Rosemary Lane, Lola Lane, Claude Rains; a sequel to Four Daughters	
1940	Virginia City	Yes		With Errol Flynn, Miriam Hopkins, Randolph Scott, Humphrey Bogart, Alan Hale, Guinn "Big Boy" Williams; released in sepia	
1940	The Sea Hawk	Yes		With Errol Flynn, Brenda Marshall, Claude Rains, Henry Daniell, Alan Hale, Flora Robson; released with a sepia sequence	
1940	Santa Fe Trail	Yes		With Errol Flynn, Olivia de Havilland, Raymond Massey, Ronald Reagan, Alan Hale, Guinn "Big Boy" Williams; released in sepia	
1941	The Sea Wolf	Yes		With Edward G. Robinson, Ida Lupino, John Garfield, Alexander Knox, Barry Fitzgerald; based on the novel by Jack London	
1941	Dive Bomber	Yes		With Errol Flynn, Fred MacMurray, Ralph Bellamy, Alexis Smith; filmed in Technicolor	
1942	Captains of the Clouds	Yes		With James Cagney, Dennis Morgan, Brenda Marshall, Alan Hale; filmed in Technicolor on location in Canada	
1942	Yankee Doodle Dandy	Yes		With James Cagney (as George M. Cohan), Joan Leslie, Walter Huston	
1942	Casablanca	Yes		With Humphrey Bogart, Ingrid Bergman, Paul Henreid, Claude Rains, Conrad Veidt, Sydney Greenstreet, Peter Lorre, S. Z. Sakall, Dooley Wilson; based on the unproduced play Everybody Comes to Rick's by Murray Burnett and Joan Alison	
1943	Mission to Moscow	Yes		With Walter Huston, Ann Harding, Oscar Homolka; based on the book by Joseph E. Davies	
1943	This Is the Army	Yes		With George Murphy, Joan Leslie, Ronald Reagan; songs by Irving Berlin; filmed in Technicolor	
1944	Passage to Marseille	Yes		With Humphrey Bogart, Claude Rains, Michèle Morgan, Philip Dorn, Sydney Greenstreet, Peter Lorre; based on the novel Men Without Country by Charles Nordhoff and James Norman Hall	
1944	Janie	Yes		With Robert Hutton, Edward Arnold, Ann Harding, Joyce Reynolds; based on the play by Josephine Bentham and Herschel V. Williams Jr. (Note: Warner Bros. produced a sequel to this film, Janie Gets Married, starring Joan Leslie and directed by Vincent Sherman.)	
1945	Roughly Speaking	Yes	Yes	With Rosalind Russell, Jack Carson, Robert Hutton, Alan Hale; Curtiz has a one-line bit part in the film (Note: Curtiz did this as a last minute fill-in for Hungarian actor Lazlo Bartos, who had become ill.)	
1945	Mildred Pierce	Yes		With Joan Crawford, Jack Carson, Zachary Scott, Ann Blyth, Eve Arden; based on the novel by James M. Cain	
1946	Night and Day	Yes		With Cary Grant (as Cole Porter), Alexis Smith, Monty Woolley; filmed in Technicolor	
1947	Life with Father	Yes		With William Powell, Irene Dunne, Elizabeth Taylor, Edmund Gwenn, Jimmy Lydon, ZaSu Pitts; based on the play by Howard Lindsay and Russel Crouse; filmed in Technicolor (Note: Life with Father was later adapted into a television series.)	
1947	The Unsuspected	Yes	Yes	A Michael Curtiz Production; with Joan Caulfield, Claude Rains, Audrey Totter, Constance Bennett, Hurd Hatfield; based on a story by Charlotte Armstrong	
1948	Romance on the High Seas	Yes	Yes	A Michael Curtiz Production; with Jack Carson, Janis Paige, Don DeFore, Doris Day, Oscar Levant, S. Z. Sakall; filmed in Technicolor; Doris Day's film debut	
1949	My Dream Is Yours	Yes	Yes	A Michael Curtiz Production; with Jack Carson, Doris Day, Lee Bowman; features a cartoon sequence with Bugs Bunny and Tweety; filmed in Technicolor	
1949	Flamingo Road	Yes	Yes	A Michael Curtiz Production; with Joan Crawford, Zachary Scott, Sydney Greenstreet; based on the play by Sally and Robert Wilder (Note: Remade as a TV movie in 1980 and a television series in 1981–1982)	
1949	The Lady Takes a Sailor	Yes		With Jane Wyman, Dennis Morgan, Eve Arden	
1949	It's a Great Feeling		Yes	Directed by David Butler; with Dennis Morgan, Doris Day, Jack Carson; Curtiz makes a cameo appearance as himself; filmed in Technicolor	
1950	Young Man with a Horn	Yes		With Kirk Douglas, Lauren Bacall, Doris Day, Hoagy Carmichael, Juano Hernandez; loosely based on the life of Bix Beiderbecke	
1950	Bright Leaf	Yes		With Gary Cooper, Lauren Bacall, Patricia Neal; based on a novel by Foster Fitzsimmons	
1950	The Breaking Point	Yes		With John Garfield, Patricia Neal, Phyllis Thaxter, Juano Hernandez; based on the novel To Have and Have Not by Ernest Hemingway (Note: Hemingway's novel also served as the inspiration for To Have and Have Not (1945) and The Gun Runners (1958).)	
1951	Force of Arms	Yes		With William Holden, Nancy Olson, Frank Lovejoy	
1951	Jim Thorpe – All-American	Yes		With Burt Lancaster (as Jim Thorpe), Charles Bickford, Steve Cochran, Phyllis Thaxter	
1951	I'll See You in My Dreams	Yes		With Doris Day, Danny Thomas (as Gus Kahn), Frank Lovejoy, Patrice Wymore	
1952	She's Working Her Way Through College		Yes	Directed by H. Bruce Humberstone; with Virginia Mayo, Ronald Reagan, Gene Nelson; Curtiz took over direction, while Humberstone recovered from the flu; filmed in Technicolor	
1952	The Story of Will Rogers	Yes		With Will Rogers Jr. (as his father), Jane Wyman, Carl Benton Reid; filmed in Technicolor	
1952	The Jazz Singer	Yes		With Danny Thomas, Peggy Lee, Mildred Dunnock; based on the play by Samson Raphaelson; filmed in Technicolor (Note: Previously filmed in 1927 and remade in 1980)	
1953	Trouble Along the Way	Yes		With John Wayne, Donna Reed, Charles Coburn	
1954	The Boy from Oklahoma	Yes		With Will Rogers Jr., Nancy Olson, Lon Chaney Jr.; filmed in WarnerColor	

=== American films – the final years: 1954–1961 ===
In 1954, Curtiz left Warner Bros., and spend the remaining years of his career working for various studios, notably Paramount and 20th Century-Fox. In 1961, during production of his final film, The Comancheros, Curtiz learned that he was suffering from incurable cancer. He died the following year.

American films – the final years: 1954–1961
Year	Title	Function		Notes	Ref.
Year	Title	Director	Other	Notes	Ref.
1954	White Christmas	Yes		Paramount Pictures; with Bing Crosby, Danny Kaye, Rosemary Clooney, Vera-Ellen, Dean Jagger; the most financially successful film of Curtiz's career; filmed in VistaVision (the first film to use this process) and Technicolor	
1954	The Egyptian	Yes		20th Century-Fox; with Jean Simmons, Victor Mature, Gene Tierney, Peter Ustinov, Edmund Purdom; based on the novel by Mika Waltari; filmed in CinemaScope and DeLuxe Color	
1955	We're No Angels	Yes		Paramount Pictures; with Humphrey Bogart, Aldo Ray, Peter Ustinov, Joan Bennett, Basil Rathbone; based on a play by Albert Husson; filmed in VistaVision and Technicolor	
1956	The Scarlet Hour	Yes		Paramount Pictures; with Carol Ohmart, Tom Tryon, Jody Lawrance; filmed in VistaVision	
1956	The Vagabond King	Yes		Paramount Pictures; with Kathryn Grayson, Oreste, Rita Moreno; filmed in VistaVision and Technicolor (Note: Previously filmed in 1930)	
1956	The Best Things in Life Are Free	Yes		20th Century-Fox; with Gordon MacRae (as Buddy DeSylva), Dan Dailey (as Ray Henderson), Ernest Borgnine (as Lew Brown); filmed in CinemaScope and DeLuxe Color	
1957	The Helen Morgan Story	Yes		Warner Bros.; with Ann Blyth, Paul Newman, Richard Carlson; filmed in CinemaScope	
1958	The Proud Rebel	Yes		Formosa Productions; distributed by Buena Vista; with Alan Ladd, Olivia de Havilland, Dean Jagger, David Ladd; filmed in Technicolor (Note: Contemporary press notices state that this film was shot in wide-screen. However, contemporary reviews indicate that it was released in standard format.)	
1958	King Creole	Yes		Paramount Pictures; with Elvis Presley, Carolyn Jones, Walter Matthau, Dean Jagger, Dolores Hart, Vic Morrow; based on the novel A Stone for Danny Fisher by Harold Robbins	
1959	The Man in the Net	Yes		The Mirisch Company; released by United Artists; with Alan Ladd, Carolyn Jones, Diane Brewster; based on the novel by Patrick Quentin	
1959	The Hangman	Yes		Paramount Pictures; with Robert Taylor, Tina Louise, Fess Parker; based on the short story "Pull Your Freight" by Luke Short	
1960	A Breath of Scandal	Yes		Paramount Pictures; with Sophia Loren, Maurice Chevalier, John Gavin, Angela Lansbury; based on the play Olympia by Ferenc Molnár; filmed in Technicolor	
1960	The Adventures of Huckleberry Finn	Yes		Metro-Goldwyn-Mayer; with Tony Randall, Patty McCormack, Neville Brand, Andy Devine, Buster Keaton, Eddie Hodges (as Huckleberry Finn); based on the novel by Mark Twain; filmed in CinemaScope and Metrocolor	
1961	Francis of Assisi	Yes		20th Century-Fox; with Bradford Dillman (as Francis of Assisi), Dolores Hart, Stuart Whitman; based on the book The Joyful Beggar by Louis de Wohl; filmed in CinemaScope and DeLuxe Color	
1961	The Comancheros	Yes		20th Century-Fox; with John Wayne, Stuart Whitman, Ina Balin, Lee Marvin; based on a novel by Paul Wellman; John Wayne took over direction for a while when Curtiz was ill; filmed in CinemaScope and DeLuxe Color	

== Awards and honors ==
=== Academy Awards ===
Listed below are all the films directed by Michael Curtiz that received Academy Award nominations for Best Picture, Best Director, Best Actor, Best Actress, Best Supporting Actor, or Best Supporting Actress.

Academy Awards
Year	Category	Nominee	Film	Result	Notes	Ref.
1935 (8th)	Best Picture	Hal B. Wallis, Harry Joe Brown, and Gordon Hollingshead for Warner Bros. and Cosmopolitan	Captain Blood	Nominated	Mutiny on the Bounty won	
1935 (8th)	Best Director	Michael Curtiz (Note: Curtiz's nomination was a write-in, and not an official one.)	Captain Blood	Nominated	John Ford won for The Informer	
1938 (11th)	Best Picture	Hal B. Wallis and Henry Blanke for Warner Bros.	The Adventures of Robin Hood	Nominated	You Can't Take It with You won	
1938 (11th)	Best Director	Michael Curtiz	Angels with Dirty Faces	Nominated	Frank Capra won for You Can't Take It with You	
1938 (11th)	Best Director	Michael Curtiz	Four Daughters	Nominated	Frank Capra won for You Can't Take It with You	
1938 (11th)	Best Actor	James Cagney (as Rocky Sullivan)	Angels with Dirty Faces	Nominated	Spencer Tracy won for Boys Town	
1938 (11th)	Best Supporting Actor	John Garfield (as Mickey Borden)	Four Daughters	Nominated	Walter Brennan won for Kentucky	
1939 (12th)	Best Short Film (two reels)	Warner Bros.	Sons of Liberty	Won		
1942 (15th)	Best Picture	Jack L. Warner, Hal B. Wallis, and William Cagney for Warner Bros.	Yankee Doodle Dandy	Nominated	Mrs. Miniver won	
1942 (15th)	Best Picture	Michael Curtiz	Yankee Doodle Dandy	Nominated	William Wyler won for Mrs. Miniver	
1942 (15th)	Best Actor	James Cagney (as George M. Cohan)	Yankee Doodle Dandy	Won		
1943 (16th)	Best Picture	Hal B. Wallis for Warner Bros.	Casablanca	Won		
1943 (16th)	Best Director	Michael Curtiz	Casablanca	Won		
1943 (16th)	Best Actor	Humphrey Bogart (as Rick Blane)	Casablanca	Nominated	Paul Lukas won for Watch on the Rhine	
1945 (18th)	Best Picture	Jerry Wald for Warner Bros.	Mildred Pierce	Nominated	The Lost Weekend won	
1945 (18th)	Best Actress	Joan Crawford (as Mildred Pierce)	Mildred Pierce	Won		
1945 (18th)	Best Supporting Actress	Eve Arden	Mildred Pierce	Nominated	Anne Revere won for National Velvet	
1945 (18th)	Best Supporting Actress	Ann Blyth	Mildred Pierce	Nominated	Anne Revere won for National Velvet	
1947 (20th)	Best Actor	William Powell (as Clarence Day)	Life with Father	Nominated	Ronald Colman won for A Double Life	

=== National Film Registry ===
As of 2020, four films directed by Michael Curtiz have been added to the National Film Registry.

National Film Registry
Title	Year		Ref.
Title	Released	Inducted	Ref.
The Adventures of Robin Hood	1938	1995	
Yankee Doodle Dandy	1942	1993	
Casablanca	1942	1989	
Mildred Pierce	1945	1996	

=== AFI's 100 Years...100 Movies ===
In 1998, the American Film Institute presented their list of the 100 Greatest American films. They revised the list in 2007. Two films directed by Michael Curtiz were included on the list both times.

AFI's 100 Years...100 Movies
Year	Rank	Film	Ref
1998	2	Casablanca (1942)	
1998	100	Yankee Doodle Dandy (1942)	
2007	3	Casablanca (1942)	
2007	98	Yankee Doodle Dandy (1942)	

== Bibliography ==
- Kinnard, Roy; Vitone, R. J. (1986). The American Films of Michael Curtiz. Metuchen, NJ, USA: Scarecrow Press. ISBN 978-0810818835.
- Layton, James; Pierce, David (2015). The Dawn of Technicolor: 1915–1935. Rochester, NY: George Eastman House. ISBN 978-0935398281.
- Robertson, James C. (1994). The Casablanca Man: The Cinema of Michael Curtiz. New York, NY, USA; London, UK: Routledge. ISBN 978-0415115773.
- Rode, Alan K. (2017). Michael Curtiz: A Life on Film. Lexington, KY, USA: University Press of Kentucky. ISBN 978-0813173917.
