= The Red Samson =

1917 film

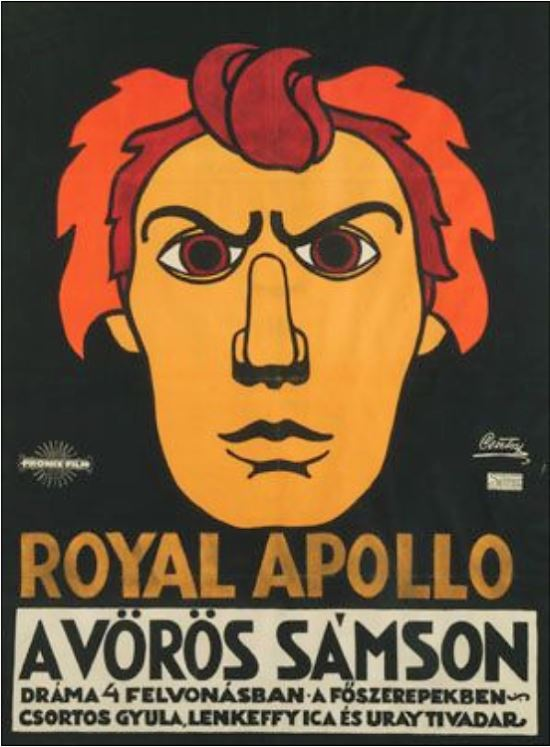
- 1917 film poster
- Directed by: Michael Curtiz
- Written by: Ladislaus Vajda
- Based on: The Bondman; 1890 novel by Hall Caine
- Produced by: Mór Ungerleider
- Starring: Gyula Csortos; Ica von Lenkeffy; Tivadar Uray
- Cinematography: József Bécsi
- Production company: Phönix
- Distributed by: Projectograph
- Release date: 20 December 1917
- Running time: 4 reels 90 minutes
- Country: Hungary
- Language: Silent

The Red Samson (Hungarian: A Vörös Sámson) (German: Der rote Simson) is a 1917 Hungarian film directed by Michael Curtiz. The production is based upon the 1890 novel The Bondman by Hall Caine.

== Cast ==
- Gyula Csortos as Samson Woronzow
- Ica von Lenkeffy as Edith Thursten
- Tivadar Uray as Michael Woronzow
- László Csiky as Edward Thursten
- János Bodnár as Ivan Woronzow
- Irma Lányi as Samson's mother

== See also ==
- The Bondman (1916)
- The Bondman (1929)
- Michael Curtiz filmography
