= Deadly Game =

Deadly Game or Deadly Games may refer to:

== Film and TV ==
- A Deadly Game (1924 film), Austrian silent directed by Michael Curtiz
- The Deadly Game (1941 film), American spy adventure
- Deadly Game (1954 film), British crime drama, a/k/a Third Party Risk
- Deadly Game, 1977 American TV film, starring Andy Griffith
- A Deadly Game (1979 film), British TV spy adventure, a/k/a Charlie Muffin
- The Deadly Game (1982 film), American-British TV philosophical thriller
- Deadly Games (1982 film), an American slasher thriller
- Deadly Game (1986 film), American suspense thriller, a/k/a The Manhattan Project
- Deadly Games (1989 film), 1989 French horror thriller, original title 3615 code Père Noël
- Deadly Game, 1991 American TV film starring Michael Beck
- Deadly Games (TV series), 1995 American UPN science fiction TV series produced by Leonard Nimoy
- Deadly Game, 1998 American TV film starring Tim Matheson, a/k/a Catch Me If You Can
- A Deadly Game, May 17, 2010 season 2 finale of American TV series Castle
- The Deadly Game (2013 film), British crime thriller, a/k/a All Things to All Men

== Other ==
- Deadly Game, 1996 American novel (Christine Feehan bibliography)
- Deadly Game, American professional wrestling event Survivor Series (1998)
- Deadly Game (album), 2002 album by American rapper X-Raided
