= The Man Who Couldn't Say No =

The Man Who Couldn't Say No refers to:

- The Man Who Couldn't Say No (1938 film)
- The Man Who Couldn't Say No (1958 film)
