= The Last Bohemian =

The Last Bohemian may refer to:

- The Last Bohemian (1912 film), a 1912 Hungarian film directed by Michael Curtiz
- The Last Bohemian (1931 film), a 1931 Czech film directed by Martin Frič
