= The Bondman (novel) =

1890 novel by Hall Caine

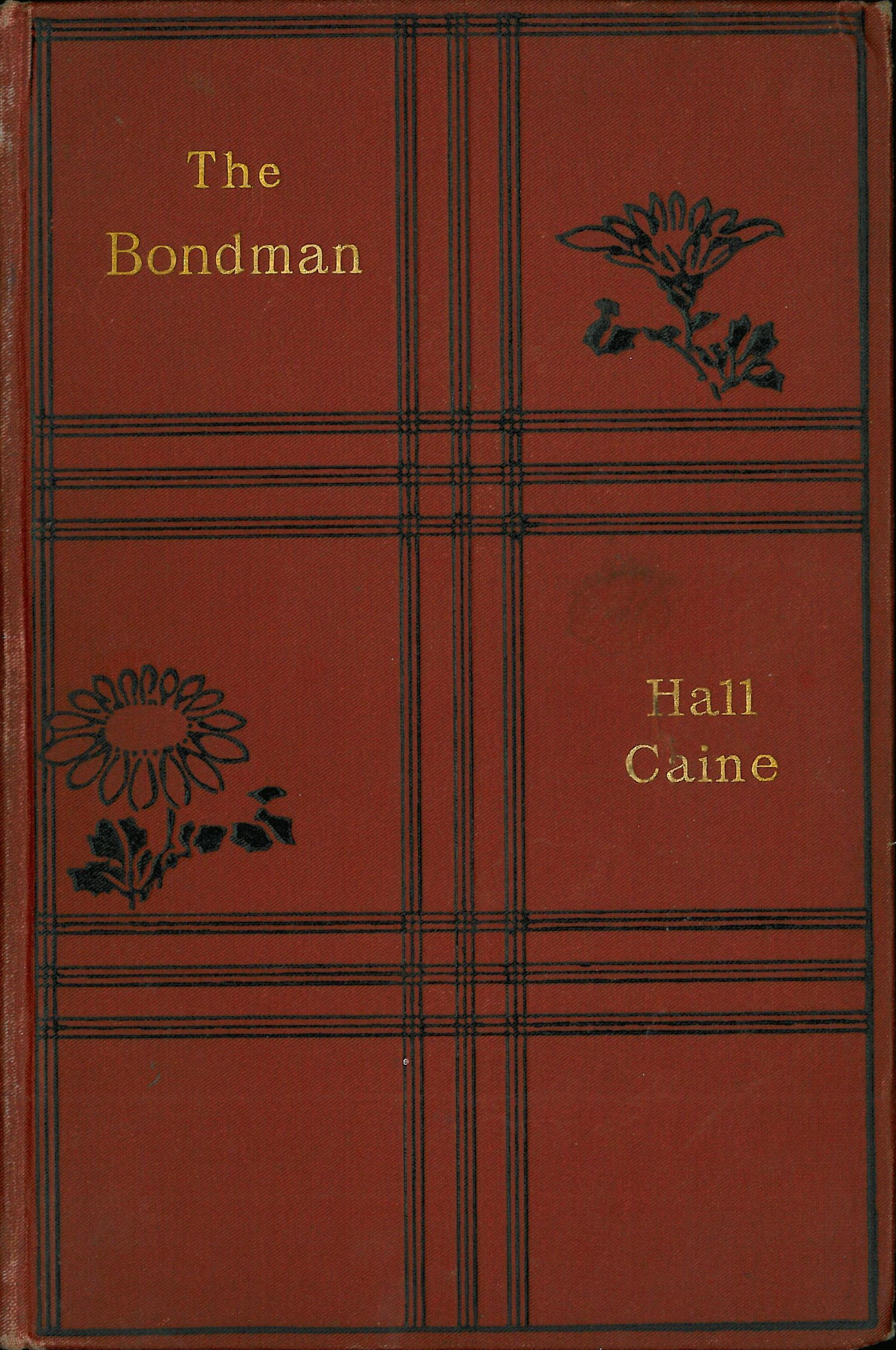
- 1910 edition of The Bondman
- Author: Hall Caine
- Language: English
- Published: 1890 (Heinemann)
- Publication place: United Kingdom
- Media type: Print (hardcover)
- Pages: 397 (1910 edition)

The Bondman is an 1890 best-selling novel by Hall Caine set in the Isle of Man and Iceland. It was the first novel to be released by the newly established Heinemann publishing company. It was a phenomenal success and was later adapted into a successful play and two silent films.

The plot revolves around two half brothers, the one, Jason, sworn to avenge the wrongs done by their father; the other, Michael, sworn to rectify these wrongs. They both fall in love with the same woman and their travels take them between the Isle of Man and Iceland, crossing personal upheavals, political revolutions and natural disasters. The novel ends with one half-brother giving his life so that the other may escape to a life with the one he loves.

== Background ==
In his autobiography, Hall Caine claimed that he identified the key thematic base for the novel as early as 1883, when he first began to consider fiction writing. However, it was not until many years later and after a number of other novels that he would take up the story. Caine claimed that the novel was based on the Biblical story of Jacob and Esau, although this has been questioned by his modern biographer as a later attempt to deflect the charge of questionable moral bases to his novels.

Caine was greatly interested in Iceland because of its connections to the Isle of Man through a shared Norse heritage and because of the Norse sagas which he admired greatly. Caine was particularly impressed by his friend William Morris’ four-volume translation from the Icelandic of the Saga of Sigurd the Volsung and the Fall of the Nibelungs, published in 1876.

Caine began work on The Bondman in March 1889, at Aberleigh Lodge, Bexley Heath, Kent. He finished the novel in October of the same year at his new home of Castlerigg Cottage, Keswick.

== Plot ==
=== The Book of Stephen Orry ===
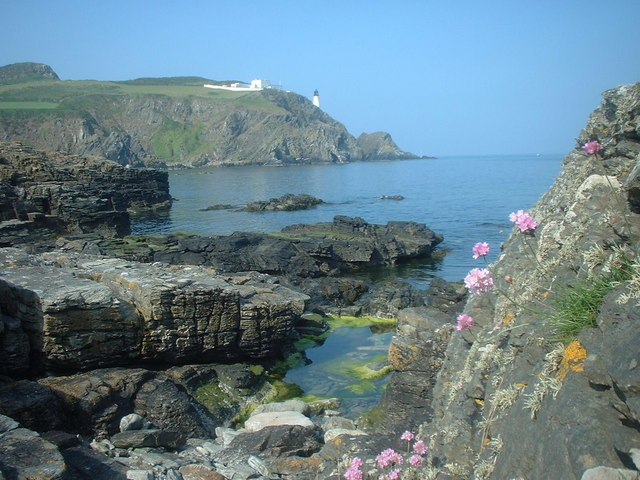
Maughold Head, where Stephen Orry suffers his fatal injury

An Icelandic fisherman, Stephen Orry, bears two sons, one to the governor's daughter in Reykjavík, another to the lowest of women on the Isle of Man. The Iceland-born son, Jason "the Red", is brought up in poverty and is left with his mother's dying wish for him to seek vengeance on his father who had brought them to that position. The Manx-born son, Michael "Sunlocks", is brought up by the Deputy Governor of the Isle of Man, alongside his daughter, Greeba, as Stephen could not support him or keep him from bad influences. When Michael is 19, Stephen returns and sends him to Iceland to make good his wrong to his wife there. As Michael sets sail from the Isle of Man, Jason arrives on a boat from Iceland. After surviving shipwreck in Ramsey bay, Jason is called upon to save Stephen Orry from his own boating accident off Maughold Head. However, Stephen dies of his injuries, but not before Jason comes to recognise him as his father and achieves a reconciliation.

=== The Book of Michael Sunlocks ===
Jason remains on the island and falls in love with Greeba. After four years without word from Michael, Greeba consents to marry Jason. However, when she then receives a letter from Michael, she goes to marry him in Iceland, where he has risen to become governor of the country newly independent of Danish rule.

Jason returns to Iceland, learns of Michael, his role in Greeba's departure and his being his half brother, and so resolves to kill him. However, Greeba learns of his plan and has him arrested. Upon learning this, Michael looks to make good his father's wrong and so sends to have Jason released.

Michael is then thrown into doubt by lies told to him in a vain attempt at blackmail by Greeba's avaricious brothers. Believing that Greeba loved Jason and had only come to him for his wealth and position, he resigns from his post in government. However, before this can come into effect, Danish soldiers storm the meeting, arrest the ministers and claim Iceland again as under Danish rule.

=== The Book of Red Jason ===
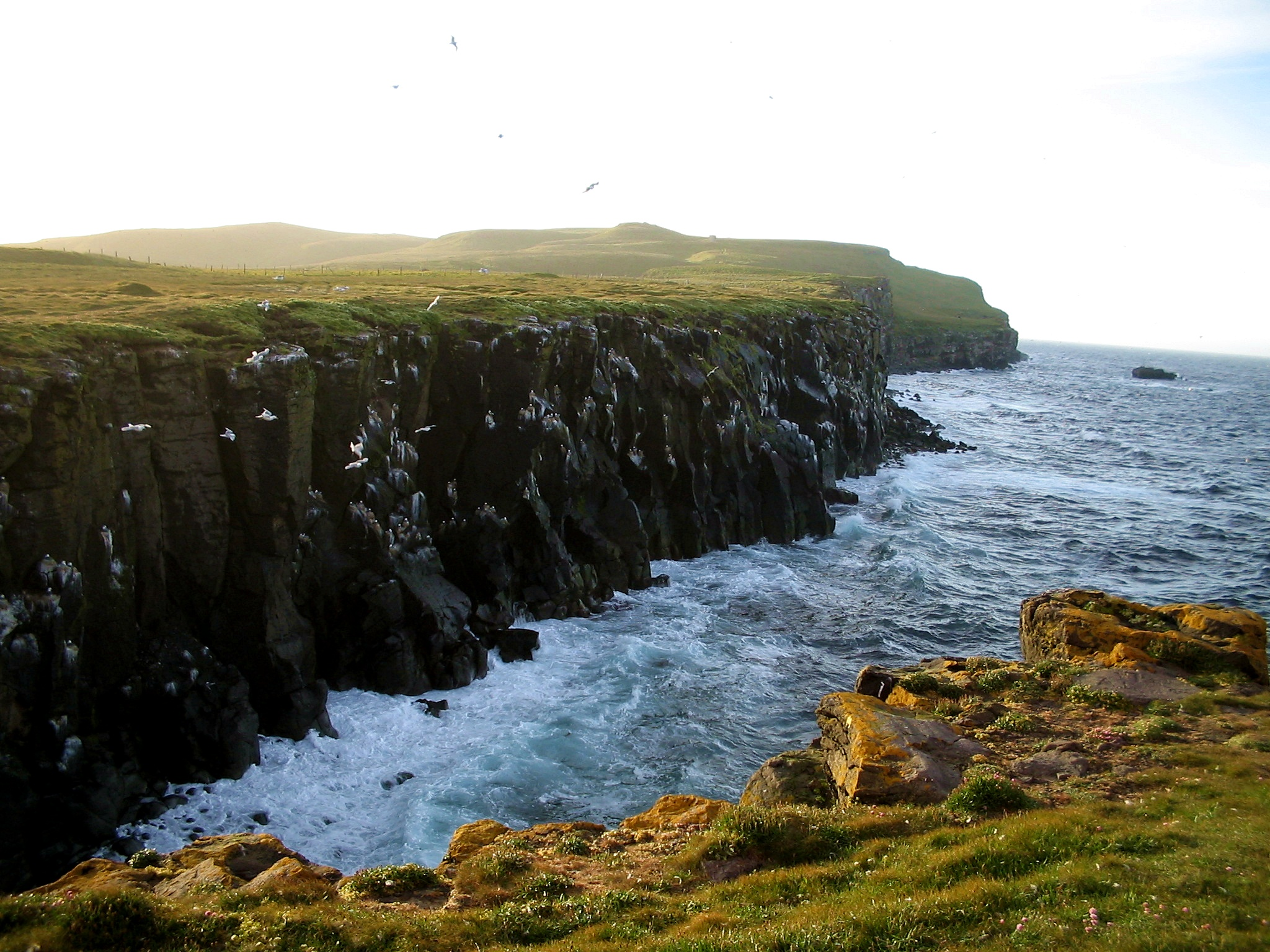
Cliff tops on Grímsey

Michael Sunlocks is sent to work in the sulphur mines penal colony. Here he grows into friendship with Red Jason, as each is unaware of the identity of the other. Jason comes to increasingly protect Michael from cruel treatment by the Danish authorities, until he is forced to carry out an escape to save Michael from certain death through the dangerous work assigned to them. However, although Jason gains his freedom, Michael is again imprisoned, this time on Grimsey, a small island off the north coast of Iceland. Although officially still a 'bondman' (a "prisoner-slave"), Michael is now blind from the exertion of the work at the mines, and so he is left in the care of a priest. Greeba joins the household as a maid, but remains unknown to Michael by keeping silent when in his presence. This she does to demonstrate that she cares little for her position but is fully devoted to him, thus proving the inverse of Michael's suspicions.

After two and a half years, the Danish authorities grow nervous of Michael and so send to have him executed. Jason, however, who has returned to Iceland after some years away, hears of this plan and so races to Grimsey ahead of the Danish soldiers. Here he orchestrates Michael's escape with Greeba, by his stepping in as bondman in Michael's place. The next day Jason is shot by the Danish soldiers and he dies satisfied knowing that Michael is with Greeba safely sailing home to the Isle of Man.

== Publishing ==
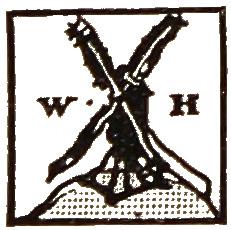
The original William Heinemann logo

The book was serialised in the Isle of Man Times and other regional UK newspapers between June and November 1889. In August 1889 Caine visited Iceland for the first time. In this, his first trip abroad with his wife, he set sail from Leith on the SS Magnetic via Bergen and the Faroe Islands. On the first leg of the trip he and his wife were overcome by seasickness but an onboard doctor curiously prescribed them opium, which successfully cured them. They stayed for two weeks in Iceland, including a visit to the sitting at Þingvellir. During his trip, Caine kept notes on things to add local colour to the Icelandic section of the book. These he generally kept in a disorderly manner, mostly on old envelopes and the backs of letters.

As was usual for Caine, he sent the first proofs of the novel to a friend for comment, this time to Robert Leighton, who he had met for the first time earlier that year. When Leighton returned the proofs on 7 November 1889, he congratulated Caine on the novel, commenting that it was "for all classes of readers. It is so grand that the highest intellect will be elevated by it. It is so simple that our shepherd boy out here might read it and be thrilled by every line of it." However, he also suggested significant changes to the historical references of the novel, which were glaringly inaccurate at that stage and which Leighton thought exposed Caine to the charge of taking "improbable liberties with circumstance." Caine took the recommendations on board and made alterations to the text, as well as acknowledging in a preface some of the other compromises of history to fiction that he did not alter in the text.

Caine's previous three novels had been published by Chatto & Windus, but after the success of The Deemster Caine was determined to have a different form of contract to receive royalties and retain the copyright. He discussed the contract with Chatto & Windus throughout November 1889 but on 6 December Andrew Chatto amicably wrote to refuse the terms, stating that the sales of The Deemster, although great, did not justify the contract and the substantial advance that Caine was asking for. Caine then turned to Heinemann, which was seeking the novel to lead the launch of the new publishing company. Caine had been introduced to Wolcott Balestier, the business partner of William Heinemann, not long before by his friend, Bram Stoker. Because Heinemann were willing to outbid Chatto & Windus, and include Caine's retention of the copyright, Caine moved to Heinemann.

The novel was published in a three-volume edition at the end of January 1890. The single-volume edition appeared in October of the same year.

== Reception ==
Upon the book's release, it was "an immediate and spectacular success, launching both the author and the new firm into orbit." It was translated into eleven languages and was continuously in print until the 1920s.

The novel was such a happy success for Heinemann that they honoured it by choosing 'Sunlocks, London' as their telegraph address, in reference to one of the novel's main characters. This remained the address for the company until telegrams were superseded by faxes.

The novel also proved to be very well received by the press and leading public figures of the day. Gladstone, then the Prime Minister, responded to the copy of the novel that Heinemann had sent on Caine's request, saying that, “The Bondman is a work of which I recognise the freshness, vigour and sustained interest no less than its integrity of aim." Leo Tolstoy read the book "with deep interest." The Times reviewed the book saying that, "It is impossible to deny originality and rude power to this saga, impossible not to admire its forceful directness, and the colossal grandeur of its lead characters." Caine's biographer in 1901 wrote that the critics "proclaimed it as one of the masterpieces of the century", describing the book as:

"one of the most powerful novels ever written, great by reason of its strength of thought and directness of utterance. And yet, here and there in its pages, are passages of wonderful softness, tender pictures of the consolation of childhood – little Sunlocks, little Greeba, and the little child Michael. This is what we grow to look for in Hall Caine, the tenderness and the tragedy of humanity. They form the strength of his novels, and it is they that will make them live through the ages, based as they are on truths and passions that are old as the world is old".

Although the Manx public would prove to be as doubtful of Caine's depiction of their island as they were of The Deemster, the Manx National Poet, T. E. Brown, was sufficiently impressed by the novel to write a review of it for The Scots Observer. In a personal letter to Hall Caine in February 1890 he wrote of the book:

"I am reading it again with fresh interest and admiration. Nor is it otherwise than pleasant to me to find in your story some trail of what I must suppose is old inveterate Manxness. [...] your book floats forth to certain success, a magnificent craft, fit for deep waters and the large horizon. Good luck to her!”

The sensation of the book's success set in motion the media obsession with Caine and his work that would remain with him for the rest of his life. This included some amount of unauthorised, inaccurate or inauthentic pieces, such as the knowing publishing of images of Hall Caine's brother and son under the pretence that they were of Caine himself in his youth.

Today, however, the book has been out of print for decades, as has the rest of Caine's work. Against the backdrop of the rest of Caine's novels, his modern biographer has rated this novel as of questionable quality, saying that "The book is hopelessly sentimental and melodramatic and not his best work, despite its enormous success when published."

== Adaptations ==
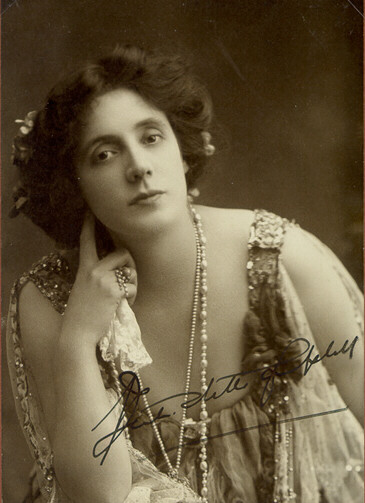
Mrs Patrick Campbell

Following the success of his co-authored adaptation of The Deemster for the stage, under the title Ben-my-Chree, Caine set about adapting The Bondman into a play. However, his initial stage version of the story was intimidating for producers as it required a large cast and very difficult sets. Wilson Barrett had received permission to produce the play in 1890, but he could not raise the large funds that the production required. The first performance of this version of the play was given in a copyright performance in Bolton one afternoon in November 1892, without scenery and with the cast reading their lines. Barrett dramatized The Bondman for his 1893-94 American tour which premiered at the Chestnut Street Theatre, Philadelphia on 28 December 1893.

The official premier of the later and final version of the play, entitled The Bondman Play, came on Friday 21 September 1906, in Drury Lane in a production by Arthur Collins. The incidental music was composed and arranged by Jimmy Glover. By this time, investment in the production was easier to arrange because many other plays by Caine had been successfully produced and an audience was effectively guaranteed for anything written by him. Caine revised the play for Collins. Written in five acts it was played in four at Drury Lane. This version of the play had changed significantly from the story of novel, most notably through a shift of location from Iceland to Sicily and with an ending that avoided the death of Red Jason.

The highlight of the show was the sulphur mine explosion and eruption of volcano Mount Stomboli. In April 1906 Collins and Caine had gone on a research trip to Sicilly where they spent a day with Leone Testa, the inspector-general of Sicily's sulphur mines. In one mine which Caine and Collins visited there were 730 steps from the bottom of the mine to the surface. Testa recommended Caine took Collins to the sulfotara near Naples. While in Naples they witnessed Mount Vesuvius erupt. Testa visited London and after seeing the play he commented that "In combining the two for dramatic purpose, Mr Collins has attained a better scenic effect than could be got out of either alone. His scheme is justified by the result, which is the most gorgeous I have ever seen on the stage The opening effects of the scene, with the line of carusi, or sulphur burners, carrying the sulphur blocks, seem to me very effective. The blue, pulsating lights from the calcarone in which the sulphur is being burned are most realistic and wonderful".

The Manx farmyard scene included three cows which came from Lord Rothschild's farm at Tring. One of the prize Alderney cows was trained to be milked on stage by Marjorie Day, an experienced milkmaid. Upon its announcement The New York Times reported that some people were shocked and quoted a writer in The St James's Gazette : "the cow-milking business is a kind of shoddy realism that mocks at serious drama and belittles the players, the audience, and the poor defenceless cow."

The cast was led by Mrs Patrick Campbell in the role of Greeba, with other roles being taken by Henry Ainley, Henry Neville, Fred Grove and Lionel Brough. It was in this play that Hall Caine's son, Derwent Caine, made his stage debut. Although he was listed simply as "Mr Derwent" in the programme notes to avoid undue attention because of his father, the press eventually revealed his true identity, but by that time he had already left the cast to prepare for his role in another of Hall Caine's plays, The Christian.

In London The Bondman Play was poorly received by the critics, but it was highly successful with the public and it received a long West End run. The show ran for eleven weeks followed by eight weeks at the Adelphi Theatre and a revival of The Prodigal Son. The production went on tour in the UK and America. Like the novel, the play was translated into a number of languages. During their European tour Japanese playwright Matsui Shōyō and actor Ichikawa Sadanji II saw the Dury Lane production. They were greatly impressed. Shōyō translated the play into Japanese and learned how to re-create the plays special effects. Japanese actor and a founder of Japanese modern theatre Otojirō Kawakami staged the play in 1909 with Fujisawa Asajiro and Ii Yoho at Hongo-za theatre in Tokyo, The setting was changed to Japan and the Philippines. The production included the volcanic eruption. When Kawakami's new western style theatre Teikoku-za opened in Osaka in March 1910 the first production was The Bondman. Lu Jinguro, leader of the Chinese student group the Spring Willow Society accredited with bringing Western-style theatre from Japan to China brought Kawakami's production to Weichun Yuan Garden in Shanghai, changing the setting to China and a south-eastern island.

Actor Manager George Rignold retired in 1900 after a successful career which included twenty-four successive performances of Henry V, Shakespeare's first long run in Australia. After the death of his wife in 1902 he lived in partial seclusion at Middle Harbour. Rignold came out of retirement in 1907 to play Jason successfully in The Bondman, produced by Bland Holt. Sidney newspaper The Sunday Sun reported that at the Theatre Royal, Melbourne Rignold "was received on his first entrance with loud and continued applause, which was repeated throughout the progress of the drama. The piece was superbly mounted, and was unanimously voted one of the best things Mr. Holt has done. The curtain was raised repeatedly after each act".

Three silent film versions of the story have been made. The first was directed by Edgar Lewis in 1916 with William Farnum as Stephen Orry and Jason, and Dorothy Bernard as Greeba. The film is particularly notable because Max Steiner composed his first ever film score for the showing of the film in New York City. The second, The Red Samson (Hungarian: A Vörös Sámson) released in 1917 in Hungary, directed by Michael Curtiz and starring Gyula Csortos, Ica von Lenkeffy and Tivadar Uray. The third film version was released in 1929, directed by Herbert Wilcox and starring Norman Kerry as Jason and Donald Macardle as Michael.

== Locations ==
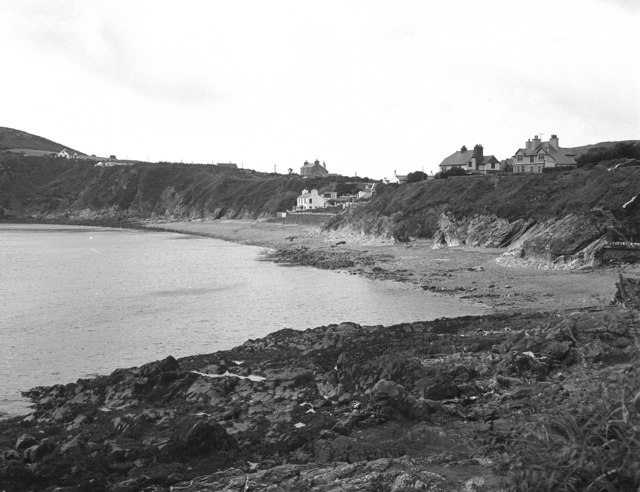
Port e Vullen, in 1979

- The Carick: "the reef in Ramsey Bay" on which Red Jason's ship is wrecked upon his first arriving on the Isle of Man (Chapter IX). This is a rocky mound near Port Lewaigue and is more commonly spelt "Carrick".
- Governor's House: The home of Greeba and Adam fairbrother. This can be identified as Lorne House in Castletown, which was the residence of the Governor of the Isle of Man from 1834. This house should not be confused with the current Government House, based in Onchan, which has been used for this purpose only since 1904.
- Port-y-Vullin: The location of the home of Stephen Orry and Liza Killey, described as "a hut built of peat and thatched with broom—dark, damp, boggy and ruinous, a ditch where the tenant is allowed to sit rent free". The bay is located halfway between Ramsey and Maughold village. Today it is more commonly spelt "Port e Vullen".
- Plough Inn: A pub in Ramsey where Stephen Orry hides to escape from the navy. The Plough is located on Parliament Street, the main street of the town, and it is still in operation today.
- The Lague: The family home and farmstead of Greeba and the Fairbrother family. This is almost certainly based on the farm at Lewaigue, a short distance from Port e Vullen, today converted into an outdoor recreation centre.
- Parliament House, Reykjavik: The home of Michael Sunlocks and Greeba, wherein Jason is arrested in his attempt on Michael's life.
- Krisuvik: The sulphur mines penal colony where Michael and Jason finally meet.
- Thingvellir: The site of the dramatic confrontation between Jason, Michael, Greeba and the Governor of Iceland.
- Grimsey: The location of Michael's period as bondman and of the novel's dramatic concluding scenes.

== Historical background ==
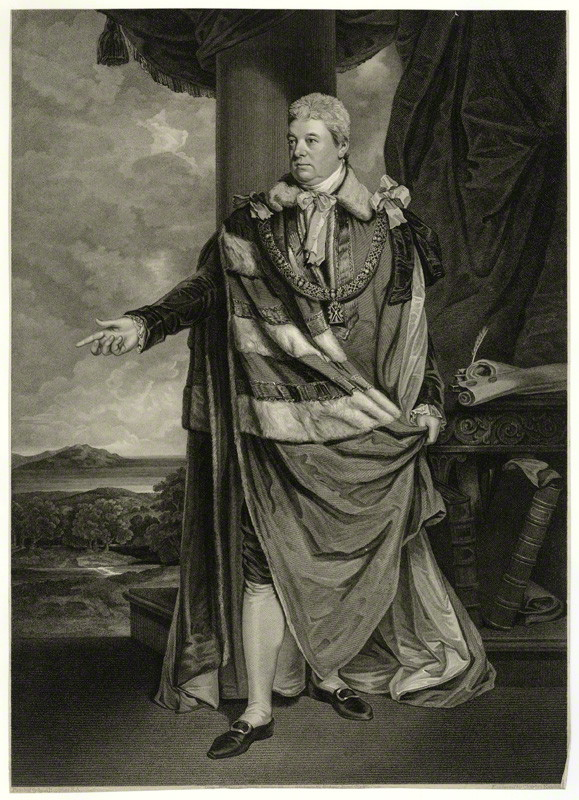
John Murray, 4th Duke of Atholl

- The "Icelandic sea-dog who bought [the Isle of Man] with blood in 1077", who Caine refers to without name in Chapter IV, is Godred Crovan, better known as "King Orry" on the Isle of Man. The Battle of Skyhill, in which he gained the island, is actually recorded as having taken place in 1079.
- The "Scottish nobleman who sold [the Isle of Man] for gold in 1765" was James Murray, 2nd Duke of Atholl. He sold the island to the English crown for £70,000 in what has come to be known as the “Revestment”.
- In contrast to Caine's novel, the fourth Duke of Athol, John Murray, is today considered to be a relatively positive steward of Manx concerns during his period as governor, from 1793 to 1828.
- The visit of the Prince of Wales accompanied by the Duke of Atholl, Captain Murray and Captain Cook on the ship, The Royal George, which occurs in Chapter IV of the novel, is clearly based on the visit of the Duke of Atholl in 1793. The Duke sailed on The Royal George under Captain Crawford, along with two other ships, Prince Edward under Captain Cook and Prince of Wales under Captain Murray. The historical records of the celebrations in Ramsey are very close to that depicted in Caine's novel: "Bone fires, illuminations and fires from towns on the adjacent hills, which appeared in a blaze, testified the general joy".
- The man appointed in replacement of Adam Fairbrother as Deputy Governor or the Isle of Man is, unusually for Caine, named correctly to the actual historical character, Cornelius Smelt. As in Caine's novel, Smelt was the first Lieutenant Governor to be directly appointed by the British Crown, on 15 June 1805.
- The Bishop who brought about the downfall of Adam Fairbrother, mentioned as "not a Manxman – a Murray, and a near kinsman of the Lord of the Island", can be identified as George Murray. He was nominated for the post by his cousin of John Murray, the Duke of Atholl, and served from 1813/14 until 1827.
- The volcano eruption that ends Book II is based on the 1789 eruption of Laki.
- The capture of the Danish fleet by the British during the Napoleonic Wars that was mentioned in Chapter XXX occurred effectively as described by Caine in 1807.

== Quotations ==
- [...] she must live where she was, a prisoner chained to a cruel rock; but she would not repine, she could wait, for the time of her deliverance was near. Her liberator was coming. He was at her feet; he was her child, her boy, her darling; and when he slumbered she saw him wax and grow, and when he awoke she saw her fetters break. Thus on the bridge of hope's own rainbow she spanned her little world of shame and pain.
- He had once been a truth-teller, but living with a woman who assumed that he must be a liar, he had ended by becoming one.
- [...] she looked up into his bronzed face and smiled proudly, and her long lashes blinked over her beautiful eyes. Her glance seemed to go through him. It seemed to go through all nature; and fill the whole world with a new, glad light.
- He was old, his life was behind him, and, save herself, he had no ties. What did it matter to him how his struggle should end? But she was young, she was beautiful, she might form new friendships, the world was before her, the world might yet be at her feet, and life, so sweet and so sad, and yet so good a thing withal, was ready and waiting for her.
- Why this haste? And why the message? Ah, these impetuous souls that rise so high and so fast sometimes go down headlong to the abyss!
- [...] faces that told of amused unbelief; calculating spirits that seemed to say that all this excitement was a bubble and would presently burst like one; sapient souls who, when the world is dead, will believe in no judgment until they hear the last trump.

== Trivia ==
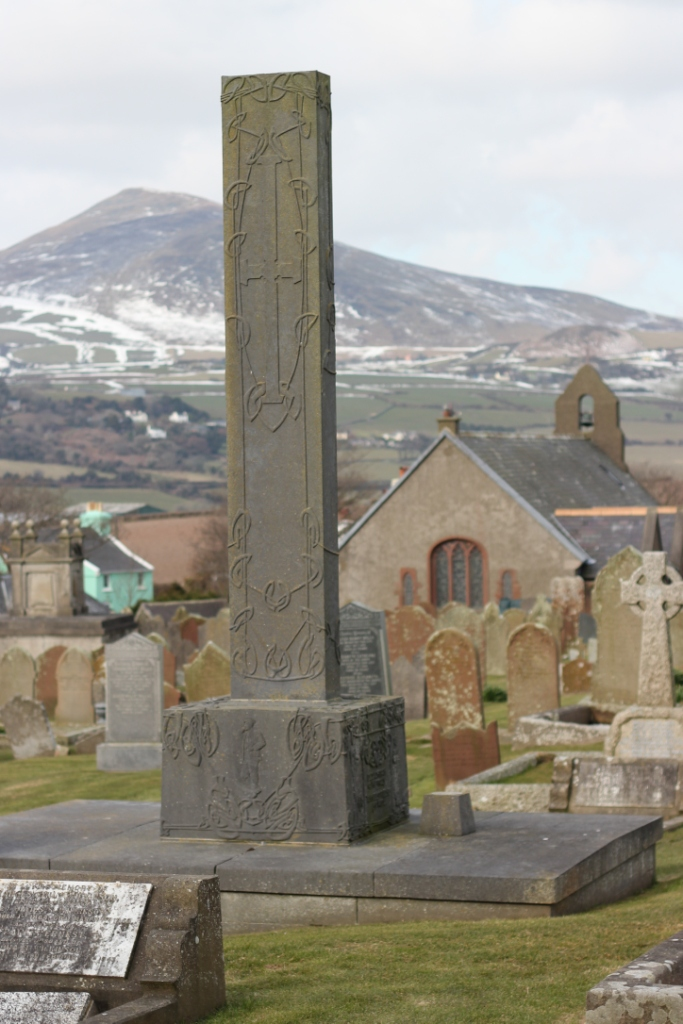
Hall Caine's gravestone in Maughold churchyard

- Caine's original title for the story was The Maid of Mona.
- Greeba, the name of the lead female character, came to be the name of Hall Caine's eventual home on the Isle of Man, Greeba Castle.
- Jason's home whilst courting Greeba was in Maughold Village. It was here, aged 17, that Caine worked first as an assistant and then as a replacement school teacher for his uncle in 1870–71. It is possible that Jason's house "at a little cottage by the Sundial that stood by the gates of the church" could be identified with the one that Caine himself stayed at during his time there.
- The ship that brings Jason to the Isle of Man is called 'The Peveril'. This is almost certainly a reference to Peveril of the Peak, Sir Walter Scott's 1823 novel partly set in the Isle of Man.
- The three old net weavers who discovered Red Jason's shipwreck at Port Lewaigue (Chapter IX) are claimed to be based on real people. Caine describes them in his non-fictional 1891 book on the Isle of Man, The Little Manx Nation. Unlike Jemmy, Danny and Juan in the novel, the characters in reality were called Jemmy, Danny and Billy.
- Davy Kerruish, the "grizzled old sea dog" and a Manxman on Red Jason's boat from Iceland to the Isle of Man, was partly based on a real historical character. His story of stolen goods buried in a grave in the Maughold churchyard is told by Caine in The Little Manx Nation in relation to a man named "Hommy-Billy-mooar".
- In Book III of the novel, Caine has Adam fairbrother communicate with native Icelanders by means of the shared Old Norse words retained in Manx and Icelandic. Although a great deal of the Isle of Man's place names are of Norse origin, there is very little of this in Manx Gaelic. Therefore, although a Manx-speaker might recognise a number of individual words in Icelandic, very little meaningful communication could actually take place.
- Adam Fairbrother's ship only reaches Iceland through extreme fog thanks to their following the direction in which a raven flies after being released by the ship's captain. Although clearly a reference to the Biblical story of Noah, that it is a raven is a clear reference to Odin, a figure that unites the Isle of Man and Iceland. In honour of Odin's ravens, the animal is today a part of the Manx coat of arms.
- According to Caine, at least some people were prone to take the novel on literal terms:

"After The Bondman, I chanced on an old Manxman in Kirk Maughold, who told me that he had known the place all his life, and he remembered Adam Fairbrother and the six big lazy brothers, and the girl Greeba, and the mill at Port-e-Vullin (for it was "himself that felled it"), but he was "plagued mortal" to fix Jason, the Icelander, and he couldn’t meet with anyone in the parish who remembered anything about him".
