= Ugly Boy =

Ugly Boy may refer to:

- The Ugly Boy, a 1918 Hungarian film
- "Ugly Boy", a song from the 2014 album Donker Mag by Die Antwoord
