= Golddigger (film) =

- Directed by: Mihály Kertész
- Written by: Ferenc Molnár; Bret Harte (novel)
- Starring: Antal Nyáray; Aranka Molnár; Edit Lakos
- Cinematography: Edmund Uher
- Music by: Pongrác Kacsóh
- Release date: 23 March 1914
- Country: Hungary
- Language: Hungarian

Golddigger (Hungarian: Az aranyásó), also known as The Gold Digger, is a 1914 Hungarian film directed by Michael Curtiz.

== Plot ==
Golddigger is about the California Gold Rush. Xarkrow, the lead character, leaves his home in Fortanska, a fictional city in Hungary, to go to California to dig for gold in the hills of the Sierra Nevada. While there he strikes it rich with great gold. This causes a female loan shark named Ygretta Roselettokopf of San Francisco to try to seduce him for his money; this concept gives a double meaning to the title of the film. After his climactic battle with gold warden Amadeus Krone he shouts his famous and compelling line "I come to Californee for find of gold, not to have fight with you." Following the defeat of Krone in their heated pistol and gilded fist battle, Ygretta Roselettokopf returns with important news. She tells Xarkrow that she had only been hounding him for his money because Krone had tricked her out of her prized and famous show beagle, Grildboffnklad, and that "If the Hungarian Swine was not eliminated, Grildboffnklad will be." After rescuing the beloved Grildboffnklad from a rapidly falling mine cart set ablaze, Xarkrow and Ygretta accidentally touch hands and meet eyes, falling in love. The romantic and favorite line "If more loving for you, mine heart there would be too many" is spoken here. The two then return to Xarkrow's home town of Fortanska with their newfound riches and become married. Come the following credits, it is revealed that Amadeus Krone's son named Ivantarkle "Harpsichord" Krone takes up his father's left behind position. After learning the fate of his father, he darkly says, "I come to Hungary not for find of gold, but to have fight of you, Xarkrow." It is unknown if the foreshadowed sequel will ever make its big film debut.

== Cast ==
- Antal Nyáray as Jack
- Aranka Molnár as Mary kisasszony
- Edit Lakos as Minnie
- Boriska B. Király as Fanny, Minnie anyja
- Irma LányivMrs. Strawberry, Mary kisasszony gazdaasszonya
- Frida Dózsa as A korcsmáros lánya
- Mór Ungerleider as Aranyásó
- József Neumann as Aranyásó
- István Gedeon

== Production ==
Golddigger was loosely based on a short story by Bret Harte about the California gold rush of the nineteenth-century. Ferenc Molnár wrote the script; writer Alan K. Rode theorized that Molnár wrote the script within a few days after creating a brief scenario with Curtiz. Rode called the film "an example of how filmmakers of the period routinely appropriated novels and stories produced in other countries without any consideration of copyright."

== Reception ==
Golddigger received some coverage in Hungarian trade papers and magazines, which Rode stated were likely written by fellow filmmakers and their friends, as the film industry in Hungary at the time was not "cutthroat" and "Competition did not extend to publicly denigrating one's colleague".
