= Vienna, City of Song (1923 film) =

1923 Austrian silent film

- Directed by: Alfred Deutsch-German
- Written by: Alfred Deutsch-German
- Starring: Franz Glawatsch; Max Ralph-Ostermann; Louis Böhm; Alice Hechy
- Production company: Singer-Film
- Release date: 9 February 1923
- Country: Austria
- Languages: Silent; German intertitles

Vienna, City of Song (German:Wien, du Stadt der Lieder) is a 1923 Austrian silent film directed by Alfred Deutsch-German and starring Franz Glawatsch, Max Ralph-Ostermann and Louis Böhm. A later sound film was also made with the same title directed by Richard Oswald.

== Cast ==
- Franz Glawatsch
- Max Ralph-Ostermann
- Louis Böhm
- Alice Hechy
- Fritz Wrede
- Louis Seeman
- Anita Berber
- Lina Frank
- Loni Lechner

== Bibliography ==
- Holmes, Deborah & Silverman, Lisa. Interwar Vienna: Culture Between Tradition and Modernity. Camden House, 2009.
