= Spring in Winter =

1917 film

- Directed by: Michael Curtiz
- Starring: Ica von Lenkeffy; Charles Puffy
- Release date: 1917
- Country: Hungary
- Language: Silent

Spring in Winter (Hungarian: Tavasz a télben) is a 1917 Hungarian film directed by Michael Curtiz.

== Cast ==
- Sándor Góth
- Erzsi B. Marton
- Ica von Lenkeffy
- Zoltán Szerémy
- Lajos Kemenes
- Charles Puffy
- Rózsi Szöllösi
- Rene Sello
- Karoly Gardai

== See also ==
- Michael Curtiz filmography
