= Prisoner of the Night (film) =

- Directed by: Mihály Kertész
- Screenplay by: Iván Siklósi; Imre Roboz
- Starring: Michael Curtiz
- Narrated by: József Neumann; Mór Ungerleider
- Cinematography: Raymond Pellerin
- Release date: 1914
- Country: Hungary

Prisoner of the Night (Hungarian: Az éjszaka rabjai) is a 1914 Hungarian film directed by Michael Curtiz.
