= 99-es számú bérkocsi =

1918 film

"99"
- Directed by: Michael Curtiz
- Screenplay by: Richárd Falk; Iván Siklósi
- Based on: The novel by R.F. Foster
- Production company: Phönix
- Distributed by: Projectograph
- Release date: 31 August 1918
- Country: Hungary

"99" is a 1918 Hungarian crime drama film directed by Michael Curtiz. The film is sometimes referred to as 99-es számú bérkocsi (transl. Rental Car Number 99).

The film's plot is about a London police officer who visits a millionaires club to make a wager that he could commit a crime that the police will not discover for 30 days.

== Cast ==
Cast adapted from Michael Curtiz European Filmography.

- Mihály Várkonyi as Hardy Maxwell, the police detective
- Gyula Gál as Mr. Barker, the private detective
- Kläry Lotto as May Flower
- Béla Lugosi as Charlie Leyton, the Police Inspector
- Jenő Balassa as Lord Seymour
- Zoltán Szerémy as Milton Armie
- Lajos Réthey as Earl of Cambrian
- Oly Spolarits as The Hunchback
- László Z. Molnár

== Production ==
Outside working at the Star Company, Bela Lugosi worked for the smaller company Phönix. His second film for the company was "99". Much of the cast had worked or would work with Lugosi, including Lajos Réthey who worked on stage with Lugosi in 1904 adaptation of Trilby and Gyula Gál who worked with Lugosi at the National Theatre in Budapest. Mihály Várkonyi would work with Lugosi again in The Black Camel (1931).

The film was directed by Michael Curtiz. A reel of the film was overexposed during the films final production, leading to Curtiz ordering Lugosi to do retakes. Lugosi reportedly refused and was excoriated in front of the entire company and did not return until Curtiz agreed to apologize to Lugosi in front of the crew.

== Release ==
"99" was premiered at the Royal-Apolló film theater in Budapest on August 31, 1918. This film did not receive a preview screening.

Film historian István Nemeskürty stated that both "99" and Az ezredes ranked among Curtiz's most successful Hungarian films. The film was apparently popular enough that Phönix proposed a follow-up titled 77 featuring the same London police officer. However, that film does not appear to have actually gone into production.
