= The Last Dawn =

1917 Hungarian film

- Directed by: Michael Curtiz
- Written by: Alfred Deutsch-German; Ladislaus Vajda
- Starring: Jenö Balassa; Leopold Kramer; Erzsi B. Marton; Kálmán Ujj
- Cinematography: József Bécsi
- Release date: 1917
- Country: Hungary
- Language: Silent

The Last Dawn (Hungarian: Az Utolsó hajnal) is a 1917 Hungarian film directed by Michael Curtiz.

== Cast ==
- Jenö Balassa as Lord Harding
- Leopold Kramer as Harry Kernett
- Erzsi B. Marton as Princess Halasdane
- Kálmán Ujj as Edward

== See also ==
- Michael Curtiz filmography
