= Az ördög =

Az ördög may refer to:

- Az ördög (play), a Hungarian play by Ferenc Molnár
- The Devil (1918 Hungarian film) (Hungarian: Az ördög), a 1918 Hungarian film based on the play
