= The Medic (1916 film) =

- Directed by: Mihály Kertész
- Written by: Aladár Fodor
- Based on: Az ezüst kecske 1898 novel by Sándor Bródy
- Produced by: Aladár Fodor; János Fröhlich
- Starring: Victor Varconi; Ferenc Hegedüs; Leontine Kühnberg
- Cinematography: József Bécsi
- Distributed by: Kino-Riport
- Release date: 23 October 1916
- Country: Hungary
- Language: Silent

The Medic (Hungarian: Az ezüst kecske) is a 1916 Hungarian film directed by Michael Curtiz.

== Cast ==
- Victor Varconi as János, medikus (as Várkonyi Mihály)
- Ferenc Hegedüs as János apja, szabó
- Leontine Kühnberg as õris Piros, vidéki lány
- Lajos Réthey as Professzor
- Rózsi Forgách as A professzor lánya
- Lajos Kemenes as Kispap / festõ
- Lucy Doraine as A szabó lánya (as Kovács Ilonka)
- Alfréd Deésy as Miniszter
- Izsó Gyöngyi as Vállakozó
- Béla Bodonyi as Hirschy
- Dezsõ Pártos
- László Tesséky
- Michael Curtiz
