= Yvette (1928 film) =

1928 film

- Directed by: Alberto Cavalcanti
- Written by: Guy de Maupassant (story); Alberto Cavalcanti
- Produced by: Pierre Braunberger
- Starring: Catherine Hessling; Ica von Lenkeffy; Thomy Bourdelle
- Edited by: Alberto Cavalcanti
- Production company: Néo-Film
- Distributed by: Les Films Armor
- Release date: 30 December 1927
- Running time: 74 minutes
- Country: France
- Languages: Silent; French intertitles

Yvette is a 1928 French silent drama film directed by Alberto Cavalcanti and starring Catherine Hessling, Ica von Lenkeffy and Thomy Bourdelle.

The film's sets were designed by the art director Erik Aaes.

== Cast ==
- Catherine Hessling as Yvette Obardi
- Ica von Lenkeffy as Comtesse Obardi
- Thomy Bourdelle as Kravalov
- Walter Byron as Jean de Servigny (as Walter Butler)
- Blanche Bernis as Dolores
- Nina Chousvalowa as Princess Kortchagin
- Clifford McLaglen as Saval
- Jean Storm as Valreali
- Pauline Carton as Pauline
- Simone Narbelle as Sylvie
- Jean-François Martial as Pascal
- Michel Duran as Louis
- Jean Marconi

== See also ==
- Yvette (1938)

== Bibliography ==
- Abel, Richard. French Film Theory and Criticism: A History/anthology, 1907-1939, Volume 2. Princeton University Press, 1993.
