= The Deed of Andreas Harmer =

1930 Austrian silent film

- Directed by: Alfred Deutsch-German
- Written by: Alfred Deutsch-German
- Produced by: Moritz Grünstein
- Starring: Oskar Marion; Tala Birell; Attila Hörbiger
- Cinematography: Hans Theyer
- Production company: Sascha Film
- Distributed by: Sascha Film
- Release date: 7 March 1930
- Running time: 98 minutes
- Country: Austria
- Languages: Silent; German intertitles

The Deed of Andreas Harmer (German: Die Tat des Andreas Harmer) is a 1930 Austrian silent crime film directed by Alfred Deutsch-German and starring Oskar Marion, Tala Birell and Attila Hörbiger. The film's sets were designed by the art director Emil Stepanek.

== Cast ==
- Arthur von Duniecki as Hofrat Othmar Valentin
- Tala Birell as Othmars Valentin's Gattin
- Gina Puch-Klitsch as Fritzi, Othmar Valentin's Tochter
- Attila Hörbiger as Marquese Robert Gomez
- Oskar Marion as Andreas Harmer
- Paula Pfluger as Emilie Harmer
- Annie Rosar as Frau Enzesfelder
- Annie Markart as Paula Enzesfelder
- Ly Corelly as Manuel Cortez
- Walter Huber as Der 'geflickte Karl'
- Roman Winter as Rüdiger von Pollatschek
- Kurt Doehn as Alonso, Robert Gomez' brother
- Polizeihund Lux as Polizeihund

== Bibliography ==
- Von Dassanowsky, Robert. Austrian Cinema: A History. McFarland, 2005.
