= The Sunflower Woman =

1918 Hungarian film

- Directed by: Michael Curtiz
- Written by: Iván Siklósi; Ivo Vojnović
- Starring: Lucy Doraine; Cläre Lotto; Iván Petrovich
- Release date: 6 December 1918
- Country: Hungary
- Languages: Silent; Hungarian intertitles

The Sunflower Woman (Hungarian: A Napraforgós hölgy) is a 1918 Hungarian film directed by Michael Curtiz. Based on the play by Yugoslav and Croatian playwright from Dubrovnik, Ivo Vojnović, the film was shot on location in Dubrovnik.

== Cast ==
- Ivo Badalic
- Jenő Balassa
- Lucy Doraine
- Lajos Kemenes
- Cläre Lotto
- Erzsi B. Marton
- Iván Petrovich
- Svetozar Petrov
- Lajos Réthey
- Anton Tiller
- Jenő Törzs

== See also ==
- Michael Curtiz filmography
