= Mrs. Tutti Frutti =

1921 film

- Directed by: Michael Curtiz
- Written by: Friedrich Porges
- Starring: Lucy Doraine; Alfons Fryland
- Release date: 14 January 1921
- Country: Austria
- Language: Silent

Mrs. Tutti Frutti is a 1921 Austrian silent film directed by Michael Curtiz.

== Plot summary ==
Alice (Lucy Doraine) is the spoiled daughter of an American millionaire who is sent to live with her uncle. After the uncle tires of her and throws her out on the street, she hatches a plan to marry a dying man (Alfons Fryland).

== Cast ==
- Lucy Doraine
- Alfons Fryland
- Josef König
- Oskar Sachs
- Armin Springer

== See also ==
- Michael Curtiz filmography
