= My Husband's Getting Married =

- Directed by: Michael Curtiz
- Written by: Frigyes Hervay (poems); Nándor Korcsmáros (screenplay)
- Produced by: József Neumann; Mór Ungerleider
- Starring: Gerő Mály; Adél Marosi; Lili Hajnóczy
- Cinematography: József Bécsi
- Music by: Mihály Nádor
- Release date: 22 May 1913 (Hungary)
- Country: Hungary
- Language: Hungarian

My Husband's Getting Married (Hungarian: Házasodik az uram) is a 1913 Hungarian film directed by Michael Curtiz.

== Cast ==
- Gerö Mály as budai füszeres (as Mály Gerõ)
- Adél Marosi as Katalin, Zsemle felesége
- Lili Hajnóczy as özv. Merengõné
- Gyula Szöreghy as Jávorka, kishivatalnok
- József Sándor as Törvényszéki díjnok
- Lajos Gellért as Grünhut házügynök
- Vilmos Sáfrány as Törvényszéki díjnok
