= Erik Aaes =

Danish set designer and art director

Erik Aaes (27 April 1899 – 19 March 1966) was a Danish set designer and art director. He was a prominent figure behind the scenes of Scandinavian theatre and in film.

== Biography ==
In 1917 Aaes attended the Danish Naval Academy, then attended art school while simultaneously working as an assistant for Nordisk Films and for the Folketeatret of Copenhagen.

He aided director Svend Gade on the production of Hamlet (1921) in Berlin, and while there he studied painting at the Kunstgewerbemuseum Berlin.

During the 1920s, Aaes worked as a designer in the Berlin theatre. Later in the decade he moved to Paris, designing sets for avant garde films for directors such as Jean Renoir and Alberto Cavalcanti until 1932.

He returned to his native Denmark in 1933 and designed sets for both film and theatrical productions in both Europe and America until his death.

== Selected filmography ==
- Yvette (1928)
- Captain Fracasse (1929)
- The Man Who Couldn't Say No (1958)
