= József Bécsi =

Hungarian cinematographer (1884–1947)

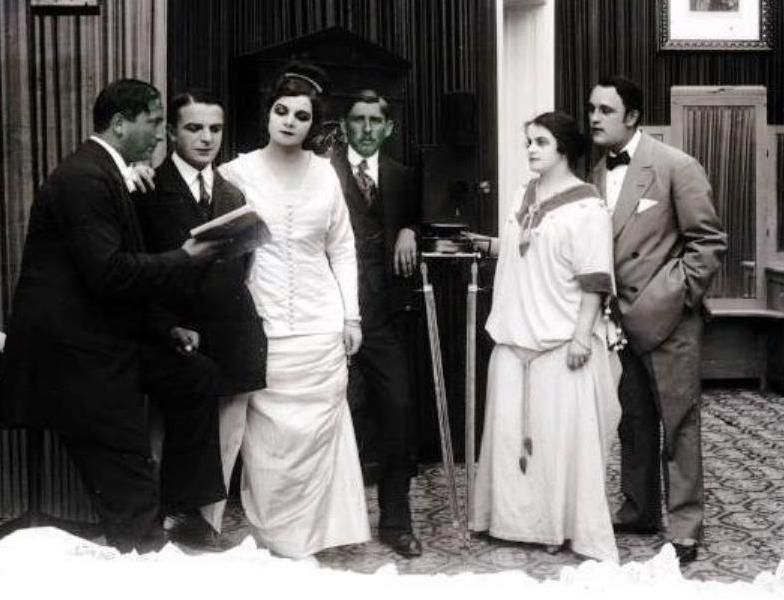
- Bécsi (third from right) in 1914.
- Born: 7 February 1884; Mosonszentmiklós, Austro-Hungarian Empire
- Died: 19 February 1947 (aged 63); Budapest, Hungary
- Occupation: Cinematographer
- Years active: 1908–1942 (film)

József Bécsi (1884–1947) was a Hungarian cinematographer, particularly active during the silent era. He began his career as a projectionist. He worked on many of the early films of director Michael Curtiz.

== Selected filmography ==
- The Last Bohemian (1912)
- My Husband's Getting Married (1913)
- Bánk Bán (1914)
- The Borrowed Babies (1915)
- The Wolf (1916)
- Seven of Spades (1916)
- The Medic (1916)
- Nobody's Son (1917)
- The Red Samson (1917)
- The Charlatan (1917)
- The Last Dawn (1917)
- Confessions of a Monk (1922)
- The Dead Wedding Guest (1922)
- The Tales of Hoffmann (1923)
- A Waltz by Strauss (1925)
- Prisoner Number Seven (1929)
- The Empress and the Hussar (1935)
- I Can't Live Without Music (1935)
- The Lady Is a Bit Cracked (1938)
- Isten rabjai (1942)

== Bibliography ==
- Burns, Bryan. World Cinema: Hungary. Fairleigh Dickinson University Press, 1996.
- Cunningham, John. Hungarian Cinema: From Coffee House to Multiplex. Wallflower Press, 2004.
- Rode, Alan K. Michael Curtiz: A Life in Film. University Press of Kentucky, 2017.
