= Elemér Thury =

Hungarian actor

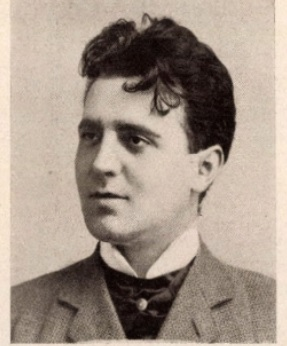
- Elemér Thury
- Born: 3 April 1874; Mezőtúr
- Died: 21 June 1944 (aged 70); Budapest
- Occupation: Actor
- Years active: 1912-1944

Elemér Thury (3 April 1874 – 21 June 1944) was a Hungarian film actor. He appeared in 14 films between 1912 and 1944. He was born in Mezőtúr, Hungary and died in Budapest.

== Selected filmography ==
- Utolsó bohém, Az (1912)
- Rablélek (1913)
- Drakula halála (1923)
- The Ball Is On (1939)
- Hungarian Eagles (1944)
