= Captive Souls =

1913 film

- Directed by: Michael Curtiz
- Screenplay by: Imre Földes
- Starring: Alfréd Deésy; Sári Fedák; Márton Rátkai; Elemér Thury
- Cinematography: Ödön Uher ifj.
- Release date: 1913
- Country: Hungary
- Language: Silent

Captive Souls (Hungarian: Rablélek) is a 1913 Hungarian film directed by Michael Curtiz.

== Cast ==
- Alfréd Deésy as Mihunka, cirkuszigazgató
- Sári Fedák as Ágnes, Kertay felesége
- Márton Rátkai as John Bull, hipnotizõr
- Elemér Thury as Kertay, kovácsmester

== See also ==
- Michael Curtiz filmography
