= Nameless (1923 film) =

1923 film

- Directed by: Michael Curtiz
- Written by: Imre Földes (play); Ladislaus Vajda
- Produced by: Arnold Pressburger; Alexander Kolowrat
- Starring: Victor Varconi; Mary Kid
- Cinematography: Gustav Ucicky; Eduard von Borsody
- Production company: Sascha-Film
- Distributed by: Sascha-Film; UFA (Germany)
- Release date: 28 December 1923
- Running time: 108 minutes
- Country: Austria
- Language: Silent

Nameless (German: Namenlos) is a 1923 Austrian silent drama film directed by Michael Curtiz and starring Victor Varconi and Mary Kid. The film's sets were designed by the art directors Artur Berger and Julius von Borsody.

== Cast ==
- Victor Varconi as Jean Moeller
- Mary Kid as Dorothy Holston
- Paul Gardner as Paul Holston
- Hans Lackner as Prof. Dr. Peterson
- Maria Raffe as Frau Holston
- Karl Farkas
- Arthur Gottlein

== Bibliography ==
- Alan K. Rode. Michael Curtiz: A Life in Film. University Press of Kentucky, 2017.
