= Mary Ann (film) =

- Directed by: Alexander Korda
- Written by: Israel Zangwill (play); László Vajda
- Starring: Ica von Lenkeffy; Tivadar Uray; Dezső Gyárfás; Nusi Somogyi
- Production company: Corvin Film
- Release date: 1919
- Country: Hungary
- Languages: Silent; Hungarian intertitles

Mary Ann is a 1919 Hungarian silent drama film directed by Alexander Korda, starring Ica von Lenkeffy, Tivadar Uray and Dezső Gyárfás, and based on the play Merely Mary Ann by Israel Zangwill.

== Cast ==
- Ica von Lenkeffy
- Tivadar Uray
- Dezső Gyárfás
- Nusi Somogyi
- Hermin Haraszti
- Gyula Szőreghy

== Bibliography ==
- Kulik, Karol. Alexander Korda: The Man Who Could Work Miracles. Virgin Books, 1990.
