= The Man Who Couldn't Say No (1958 film) =

- Directed by: Kurt Früh
- Written by: Hans Jacoby (novel); Max Kolpé
- Produced by: Helmut Beck; Ole Mynster; Preben Philipsen; Conrad von Molo
- Starring: Heinz Rühmann; Hannelore Schroth; Siegfried Lowitz
- Cinematography: Göran Strindberg
- Edited by: Edith Schlüssel
- Music by: Heinrich Sutermeister
- Production companies: Rialto Film; PEN-Filmproduktion
- Distributed by: Constantin Film
- Release date: 4 September 1958
- Running time: 91 minutes
- Countries: West Germany; Denmark; Switzerland
- Language: German

The Man Who Couldn't Say No (German: Der Mann, der nicht nein sagen konnte) is a 1958 comedy film directed by Kurt Früh and starring Heinz Rühmann, Hannelore Schroth and Siegfried Lowitz. It represented an early co-production between the Danish company Rialto Film and the German distributor Constantin Film.

The film's sets were designed by the art director Erik Aaes. It was shot at studios in Hellerup in Copenhagen and at the Bavaria Studios in Munich.

== Cast ==
- Heinz Rühmann as Thomas Träumer
- Hannelore Schroth as Eva Träumer
- Siegfried Lowitz as Alfons Ulrich
- Ursula Heyer as Bettina
- Renate Ewert as Marilzn
- Helga Münster as Hilde
- Franz-Otto Krüger as Kommisar Kümmelmann
- Wolfgang Kieling as Untersuchungsrichter
- Willi Rose as Polizei-Wachtmeister
- Erwin Linder as Polizei-Reviervorsteher
- Carl Voscherau as Gefängniswachtmeister
- Clemens Hasse as Angestellter beim Hundezwinger
- Inge Stolten as Fürsorgerin

== Bibliography ==
- Bock, Hans-Michael & Bergfelder, Tim. The Concise CineGraph. Encyclopedia of German Cinema. Berghahn Books, 2009.
