= Avalanche (1923 film) =

1923 film

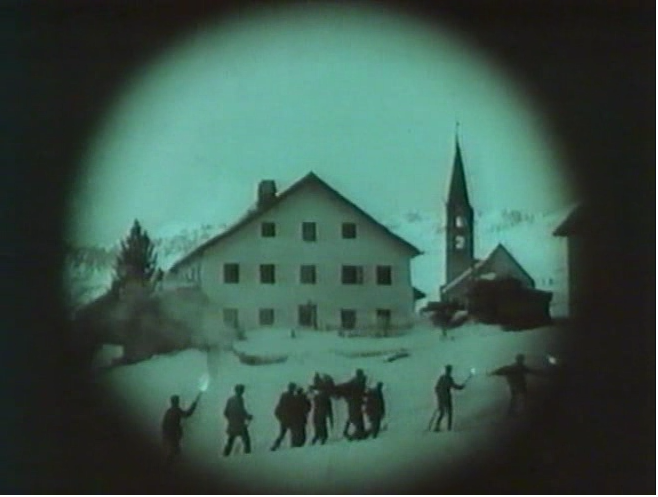
- Final scene
- Directed by: Michael Curtiz
- Written by: Ladislaus Vajda
- Produced by: Arnold Pressburger
- Starring: Victor Varconi; Mary Kid
- Cinematography: Gustav Ucicky
- Distributed by: Sascha-Film
- Release date: 16 October 1923
- Running time: 71 minutes
- Country: Austria
- Language: Silent

Avalanche (German: Die Lawine) is a 1923 Austrian silent drama film directed by Michael Curtiz, and produced by Arnold Pressburger. The film's sets were designed by the art director Julius von Borsody.

== Cast ==
- Victor Varconi as George Vandeau
- Mary Kid as Marie Vandeau
- Walter Marischka as The Child
- Lilly Marischka as Kitty
- Mathilde Danegger as Jeanne Vandeau

== Bibliography ==
- Alan K. Rode. Michael Curtiz: A Life in Film. University Press of Kentucky, 2017.
