= Seven of Spades (film) =

- Directed by: Michael Curtiz
- Written by: István Lázár
- Produced by: Aladár Fodor; János Fröhlich
- Starring: Eugenia Della Donna; Sándor Virányi
- Cinematography: József Bécsi
- Distributed by: Kino-Riport
- Release date: 9 October 1916
- Country: Hungary
- Language: Silent

Seven of Spades (Hungarian: Makkhetes) is a 1916 Hungarian film directed by Michael Curtiz.

== Cast ==
- Eugenia Della Donna as A bankár lánya
- Sándor Virányi as Róbert
