= Jean the Tenant =

- Directed by: Michael Curtiz
- Release date: 1917
- Country: Hungary
- Language: Hungarian

Jean the Tenant (Hungarian: Árendás zsidó) is a 1917 Hungarian film directed by Michael Curtiz.
