= Magic Waltz =

1918 Hungarian film

- Directed by: Michael Curtiz
- Written by: Michael Curtiz
- Cinematography: Eduard Hősch
- Release date: 1918
- Running time: 95 minutes
- Country: Hungary
- Language: Hungarian

Magic Waltz (Hungarian: Varázskeringő) is a 1918 Hungarian film directed by Michael Curtiz. The film is based on the operetta Ein Walzertraum by Oscar Straus, Leopold Jacobson and Felix Dörmann.

== Plot ==
Joachim XIII, Grand Duke of Flausenthurm, is forced to marry his daughter, Grand Duchess Helena, to Niki, Viennese Uhlan general. The new husband does not like the procedure and goes out on the wedding night. The melody of a Viennese waltz attracts him to a small square. The waltz is played by a female orchestra that has come here from Vienna, led by Franci. The latter later meets Helena and with the help of music and good advices tries to reunite the wedded couple.

== Cast ==
- Margit Lux
- Victor Varconi
- Lajos Ujvry
- Ilona Báhhidy
- Endre Boross

== Reception ==
Hangosfilm cites three contemporary reviews:

"Sooner or later, all those plays and novels that were a great success on the stage or in the book market at the time are put on stage. Does one need a greater success than the one that The Magic Waltz had? The play was performed three hundred times abroad and in the capital. Nothing could be more natural that after these, a great success awaits the film as well. The film The Magic Waltz is the first significant work of the Semper factory, of the factory that started operating not so long ago.” (review in Színházi Élet, 1918)

“The film version of Oszkár Straus’ world-famous operetta The Magic Waltz. It was produced by a young company — Semper — but with this work, it is already considered a serious and noteworthy worker in the film industry. The routine direction of Mihály Kertész was effective this time too, and the delicate and dramatic performance of the young Margit Lux stands out among the actors. The masculine appearance and perfect art of Mihály Várkonyi, the beauty and elegance of Ilona Bánhidy, and the light-hearted humor of Victor Varconi's lieutenant." (Pesti Napló, January 21, 1919)

"The Magic Waltz was one of the biggest box office hits on our operetta stage at the time and was not worthy of more than one jubilee performance. We are convinced that the operetta will now, in its film renaissance, be enjoyed by cinema-going audiences with no less pleasure than when it conquered theatre-loving audiences in its original form. Everyone knows the story of the play, so it is completely unnecessary to tell it here. We only note that the film version of The Magic Waltz is in many ways nicer, funnier, livelier and more stylish than the stage play itself." (review. in Mozihét, 1918)
