= Today and Tomorrow (1912 film) =

- Directed by: Mihály Kertész
- Written by: Imre Roboz; Iván Siklósi
- Starring: Gyula Abonyi; Ilona Ágh
- Cinematography: Raymond Pellerin
- Release date: October 14, 1912
- Country: Hungary
- Language: Silent

Today and Tomorrow (Hungarian: Ma és holnap) is a 1912 film directed by Michael Curtiz, and starring Gyula Abonyi and Ilona Ágh.

== Cast ==
- Artúr Somlay - Mel grof
- Gyula Abonyi - Az öreg gróf
- Ilona Ágh - Az öreg gróf felesége (as Veszprémyné)
- Endre Szeghő - Kázmér herceg
- Gyula Fehér - A bankár
- Ilonka Ordó - Pierette
- Gyula Szalay - Pierett
- Michael Curtiz - Arisztid
- Antal Hajdu - Dezső gróf
- Böske Kelemen - Szobaleány
- K. Kovács Andor - Inas (as K.Kovács Andor)
- László Gabányi - Tiszttartó (as Gabányi)
- Artúr Somlay - Mel gróf
- Ilona Aczél - A hercegnő
