= The Last Bohemian (1912 film) =

1912 film

- Directed by: Michael Curtiz
- Screenplay by: Zsolt Harsányi
- Produced by: József Neumann; Mór Ungerleider
- Starring: Antal Nyáray; Elemér Thury; Béla Bodonyi; Zoltán Sipos
- Cinematography: József Bécsi
- Music by: Zsigmond Vincze
- Release date: 1912
- Running time: 60 minutes
- Country: Hungary
- Language: Silent

The Last Bohemian (Hungarian: Az Utolsó bohém) is a 1912 Hungarian film directed by Michael Curtiz. It was Curtiz's debut film as a director.

== Cast ==
- Antal Nyáray as Vér Tóni színész
- Elemér Thury as Gál Sándor ügyvéd
- Béla Bodonyi as Schrõder Gusztáv gazdag magánzó
- Zoltán Sipos as István
- Ilonka Bedõ as Ilonka, Schrõder lánya
- Frigyes Hervay as self
- Ernö Király as Király Ernõ
