= Victor Varconi =

Hungarian-American actor (1891–1976)

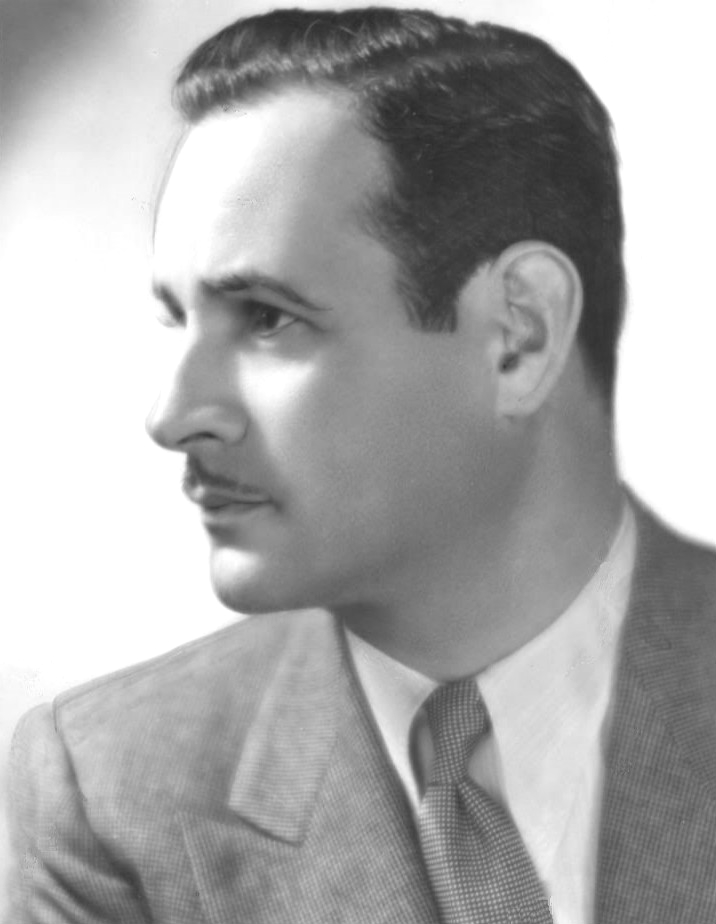
- Varconi in 1934
- Born: Mihály Várkonyi; March 31, 1891; Kisvárda, Austria-Hungary
- Died: June 6, 1976 (aged 85); Santa Barbara, California, U.S.
- Other name: Michael Varkonyi
- Occupation: Actor
- Years active: 1913–1959
- Spouses: Anna Aranyosy (m. 1919; died 1949): Lilliane Varconi

Victor Varconi (born Mihály Várkonyi; March 31, 1891 – June 6, 1976) was a Hungarian actor who initially found success in his native country, as well as in Germany and Austria, in silent films, before relocating to the United States, where he continued to appear in films throughout the sound era. He also appeared in British and Italian films.

== Biography ==
Born in Kisvárda, Austria-Hungary, Varconi was the first known Hungarian actor to make a film in the United States. He was educated at a commercial school in Hungary, after which he worked for an insurance company as a solicitor. After he developed an interest in acting, he attended the Actor Art High School in Budapest, from which he progressed to acting with the National Theatre in Budapest. While there, he performed in works that included Shakespearean plays and Molnar's Liliom and The Wolf. He went on to act with a Hungarian film company and in U.F.A. films in Berlin.

He worked under contract to Cecil B. DeMille, and played Pontius Pilate in DeMille's 1927 production of The King of Kings. That same year, he played Amos Hart, husband of murderess Roxie Hart, in the first film version of Chicago.

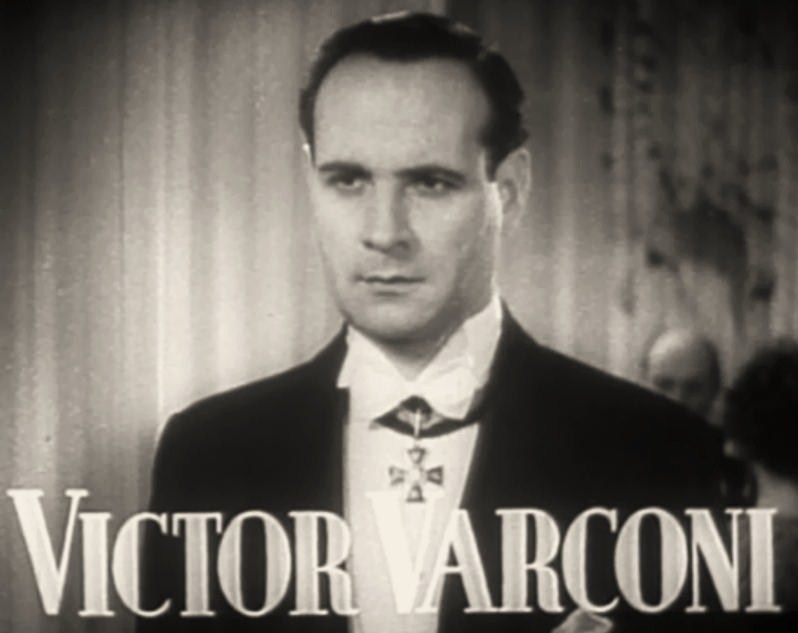
Varconi in Roberta (1935)

Owing in part to his Hungarian accent, Varconi's popularity reportedly waned with the advent of sound films and he was cast in smaller parts, often playing Hispanic characters. He worked on the New York City stage and wrote for radio.

== Death ==
He died from a heart attack in Santa Barbara, California on June 6, 1976, at the age of 85, survived by his second wife, Lilliane. He was interred at the Calvary Cemetery, East Los Angeles, California.

== Selected filmography ==
- Márta (1913) - A doktor
- The Yellow Foal (1914) - Laci, Csorba fia
- The Exile (1915) - Miklós
- Bánk Bán (1915) - Ottó herceg
- Tetemrehívás (1915)
- Éjféli találkozás (1915) - Sugár Laci, pásztor
- Havasi Magdolna (1915) - Juon, a parasztlegény
- Az ezüst kecske (1916) - János, medikus
- A gyónás szentsége (1916) - A meggyilkolt fiatalember
- A Nagymama (1916) - Kálmán
- Miska the Magnate (1916) - Baracs
- Farkas (1917) - Szabó Gyuri
- Csaplárosné (1917) - Betyár
- A csikós (1917) - Andris, a csikóslegény
- The Schoolmistress (1917) - ifjabb Nagy István
- Mágia (1917) - Pál
- St. Peter's Umbrella (1917) - Wibra Gyuri
- A Gyurkovics leányok (1917)
- A riporterkirály (1917) - Toll Ákos, az ifjú riporter
- Az utolsó éjszaka (1917)
- A megbélyegzett (1917) - Lévai Kálmán, titkár
- Ciklámen (1918) - Lehotai, a férj barátja
- Petöfi dalciklus (1918)
- A 99-es számú bérkocsi (1918) - Herr mit vielen Namen
- The Devil (1918) - Száki János, festõmüvész
- Sergius Panin (1918) - Sergius Panin
- Hotel Imperial (1918) - Almássy fõhadnagy
- A szerzetes (1918) - Majthényi László gróf
- A skorpió I. (1918) - Jean Morell
- Magic Waltz (1918) - Niki hadnagy
- A Métely (1918) - George Dupont, a beteg
- Baccarat (1919) - Robert de Chanceroy
- Sappho (1919) - Jean Gaussin
- White Rose (1919) - Halil Patrona
- Kutató Sámuel (1919) - Sámuel
- A Legnagyobb bün (1919)
- A víg özvegy (1920) - Danilo
- Die sieben Todsünden (1920)
- Der Mann mit den drei Frauen (1920)
- A számüzött (1920)
- The Asian Sun (1921) - Sekretär
- Aus den Tiefen der Großstadt (1921)
- Junge Mama (1921) - Prinz Egon
- Nachtbesuch in der Northernbank (1921)
- The Red Peacock (1921) - Alfred Germont
- Serpolette (1922) - Péter herceg
- The Blood (1922) - Dr. Robert Kargert, Advokat
- Masters of the Sea (1922) - Captain Scott
- A Vanished World (1922) - Matrose Vannoni
- Sunken Worlds (1922)
- Sodom and Gomorrah (1922) - Priester des Lyzeums - Engel des Herrn
- Der Junge Medardus (1923) - Medardus Klähr
- Die Lawine (1923) - George Vandeau
- Namenlos (1923) - Jean Moeller
- Poisoned Paradise: The Forbidden Story of Monte Carlo (1924) - Dr. Bergius
- Triumph (1924) - William Silver
- Changing Husbands (1924) - Oliver Evans
- Feet of Clay (1924) - Bookkeeper
- Worldly Goods (1924) - Clifford Ramsay
- L'uomo più allegro di Vienna (1925) - William
- Ballettratten (1925) - Intendant Holberg
- Dancing Mad (1925) - Edmund Chauvelin
- The Last Days of Pompeii (1926) - Glauco
- The Volga Boatman (1926) - Prince Dimitri
- Silken Shackles (1926) - Tade Adrian
- For Wives Only (1926) - Dr. Rittenhaus
- Fighting Love (1927) - Gabriel Amari
- The Little Adventuress (1927) - George La Fuente
- The King of Kings (1927) - Pontius Pilate - Governor of Judea
- The Angel of Broadway (1927) - Jerry Wilson
- The Forbidden Woman (1927) - Colonel Gautier
- Chicago (1927) - Amos Hart
- Tenth Avenue (1928) - Bob Peters
- Sinner's Parade (1928) - Al Morton
- The Divine Lady (1929) - Horatio Nelson
- Eternal Love (1929) - Lorenz Gruber
- Kult ciala (1930) - Czeslaw
- You'll Be in My Heart (1930)
- The Citadel of Warsaw (1930)
- Doctors' Wives (1931) - Dr. Kane Ruyter
- The Black Camel (1931) - Robert Fyfe
- Men in Her Life (1931) - Count Ivan Karloff
- Safe in Hell (1931) - General Emmanuel Jesus Maria Gomez
- Doomed Battalion (1932) - Artur Franchini
- The Rebel (1932) - Kapitän Leroy, Oberkommandant von St. Vigil
- The Song You Gave Me (1933) - Karl Linden
- Menace (1934) - Stephen Ronsart
- Roberta (1935) - Prince Ladislaw
- Mister Dynamite (1935) - Jarl Dvorjak
- A Feather in Her Hat (1935) - Paul Anders
- The Three-Cornered Hat (1935) - The Miller
- Dancing Pirate (1936) - Don Balthazar
- The Plainsman (1936) - Painted Horse
- Trouble in Morocco (1937) - Kamaroff
- Men in Exile (1937) - Colonel Emanuel Gomez
- Big City (1937) - Paul Roya
- King of the Newsboys (1938) - Wire Arno
- Suez (1938) - Victor Hugo
- Submarine Patrol (1938) - Vanzano - Italian Naval Chaplain
- The Story of Vernon and Irene Castle (1939) - Grand Duke
- Mr. Moto Takes a Vacation (1939) - Paul Borodoff
- Disputed Passage (1939) - Dr. LaFerriere
- Everything Happens at Night (1939) - Cavas
- The Man from Dakota (1940) - Colonel Kuragen (uncredited)
- Strange Cargo (1940) - Fisherman
- The Sea Hawk (1940) - General Aguirre
- Federal Fugitives (1941) - Otto Lieberman aka Dr. Frederic Haskell
- Forced Landing (1941) - Hendrick Van Deuren
- Reap the Wild Wind (1942) - Lubbock
- My Favorite Blonde (1942) - Miller
- They Raid By Night (1942) - Colonel Otto von Ritter
- For Whom the Bell Tolls (1943) - Primitivo
- Undercover (1943) - Enemy Security Officer (uncredited)
- The Hitler Gang (1944) - Rudolph Hess
- The Story of Dr. Wassell (1944) - Captain of the 'Janssen' (uncredited)
- Scotland Yard Investigator (1945) - Jules
- Dakota (1945) - Frenchman (uncredited)
- Unconquered (1947) - Captain Simeon Ecuyer
- Where There's Life (1947) - Finance Minister Zavitch
- Pirates of Monterey (1947) - Captain Cordova
- Samson and Delilah (1949) - Lord of Ashdod
- The Man Who Turned to Stone (1957) - Dr. Myer
- Alfred Hitchcock Presents (1958) (Season 3 Episode 22: "The Return of the Hero") - Count d'Auberge
- The Atomic Submarine (1959) - Dr. Clifford Kent (final film role)
