= Ica von Lenkeffy =

Hungarian actress (1896–1955)

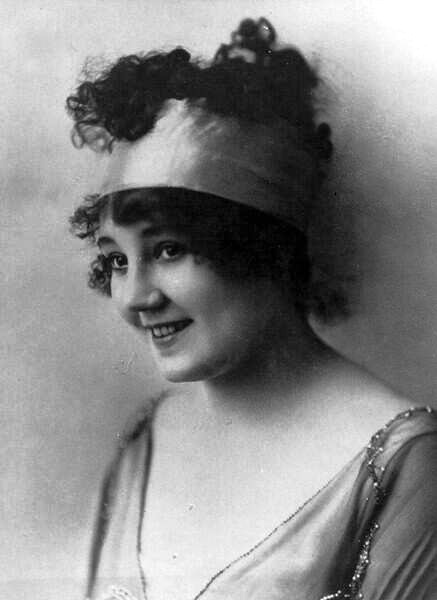
- von Lenkeffy in 1917
- Born: Ilona Kaukál; 25 October 1896; Miskolc, Hungary
- Died: 25 January 1955 (aged 58); Budapest, Hungary
- Occupation: Actress
- Years active: 1912–1928

Ica von Lenkeffy (born Ilona Kaukál; 25 October 1896 – 25 January 1955) was a Hungarian film actress of the silent era. She appeared in 26 films between 1912 and 1928. She was born in Miskolc, Hungary and died in Budapest.

== Partial filmography ==
- A Vörös Sámson (1917)
- Tavasz a télben (1917)
- A Senki fia (1917)
- St. Peter's Umbrella (1917)
- A Kuruzsló (1917)
- Sulamith (1917)
- Mary Ann (1918)
- Faun (1918)
- Liliom (1919)
- Man of Gold (1919)
- The Inheritance of Tordis (1921)
- Othello (1922)
- Miss Madame (1923)
- Yvette (1928)
- Baccarat (Souris d'hôtel, 1929)
