= Alfred Deutsch-German =

Austrian writer and film director (1870–1943)

- Born: 27 September 1870; Wien, Austria-Hungary
- Died: 1943 (aged 72–73); Auschwitz-Birkenau, German-occupied Poland
- Occupations: Film director, Screenwriter, Journalist, Playwright
- Years active: 1913-1938 (film)

Alfred Deutsch-German (1870–1943) was an Austrian journalist, playwright, screenwriter, and film director. From 1913 he worked for the Wiener Kunstfilm company as a screenwriter. Between 1922 and 1934 he directed eight films. Deutsch-German worked in the Austrian film industry until the Anschluss of 1938, but with less direct involvement in the production of films towards the end. After the so-called Anschluss of Austria to Germany, he went into exile in Nice in order to escape persecution by the National Socialists as a Jew. There he was interned in the Drancy collection camp and deported to Auschwitz on 28 October 1943, where he was gassed a short time later.

Following the Nazi takeover, the Jewish Deutsch-German went into exile in France. He was later arrested during the German occupation of France and held at the Drancy internment camp. He was later sent to Auschwitz where he was killed.

== Filmography ==
=== Screenwriter ===
- Bogdan Stimoff (1916)
- The Last Dawn (1917)
- The Eye of the Buddha (1919)
- Ludwig II (1922)
- Vienna, City of Song (1923)
- Franz Lehar, der Operettenkönig (1925)
- Archduke John (1929)

=== Director ===
- Vienna, City of Song (1923)
- Franz Lehar, der Operettenkönig (1925)
- Frau Braier aus Gaya (1926)
- The Deed of Andreas Harmer (1930)
- Der Musikant von Eisenstadt (1934)

== Bibliography ==
- Weniger, Kay. 'Es wird im Leben dir mehr genommen als gegeben ...' Lexikon der aus Deutschland und Österreich emigrierten Filmschaffenden 1933 bis 1945. ACABUS Verlag, 2011.
