= Peace's Road =

- Directed by: Michael Curtiz
- Release date: 1917
- Country: Hungary
- Language: Hungarian

Peace's Road (Hungarian: A béke útja) is a 1917 Hungarian film directed by Michael Curtiz.
