= The Fishing Bell =

- Directed by: Michael Curtiz
- Release date: 1917
- Country: Hungary
- Language: Hungarian

The Fishing Bell (Hungarian: Halálcsengö) is a 1917 Hungarian film directed by Michael Curtiz.
