= The Ugly Boy =

- Directed by: Michael Curtiz
- Release date: 1918
- Country: Hungary
- Language: Hungarian

The Ugly Boy (Hungarian: A csúnya fiú) is a 1918 Hungarian film directed by Michael Curtiz.
