= A skorpió I. =

A Skorpió I.
- Directed by: Michael Curtiz
- Written by: Iván Siklósi
- Release date: 1918
- Country: Hungary
- Language: Hungarian

A skorpió I. is a 1918 Hungarian film directed by Michael Curtiz.
