= A Deadly Game (1924 film) =

1924 film directed by Michael Curtiz

- Directed by: Michael Curtiz
- Release date: 1924
- Country: Austria

A Deadly Game (German: Ein Spiel ums Leben) is a 1924 film directed by Michael Curtiz.
