= Alan K. Rode =

American film scholar

Alan K. Rode (pronounced Roe-dee) is an American film scholar and preservationist, cinema host and producer. He is best known for his books, Michael Curtiz: A Life in Film, Charles McGraw: Biography of a Film Noir Tough Guy and Blood on the Moon.

== Life and career ==
Rode was born in Orange, New Jersey. His mother was born and raised in Hollywood, where she was an extra in Our Gang comedy shorts and studied at Ben Bard Drama. His maternal grandfather was a violinist and composer who ascended from playing mood music on silent film sets and movie bit parts to Universal Studios house composer and eventually founded Corelli-Jacobs Recording Inc. A great-uncle doubled Gary Cooper and fought Jack Dempsey. Another grandfather promoted rodeos with cowboy star Hoot Gibson at Los Angeles Gilmore Stadium. After graduation from Summit High School, he enlisted in the United States Navy. He transitioned to his next career in the aerospace and services industries while earning advanced degrees in education and management. He began writing about film in the 1990s.

Rode is a charter director and treasurer of the Film Noir Foundation and co-hosts the NOIR CITY, Hollywood and Chicago film festivals. He has been the producer and host of the annual Arthur Lyons Film Noir Festival in Palm Springs, California since 2008 and has hosted numerous other cinema events. In addition to his many filmed interviews of Hollywood artists, he has produced or written and narrated over fifty (50) classic film Blu-ray commentaries and special features and appeared as a Spotlight co-host on Turner Classic Movies (TCM) in 2018.

== Filmography ==
As producer/writer

- 2017 - Into the Darkness: Mann, Alton and T-Men
- 2017 - A Director's Daughter: Nina Mann
- 2017 - Below the Surface: He Walked by Night
- 2018 - Dennis O'Keefe: An Extraordinary Ordinary Guy
- 2018 - Deadly is the Male: The Making of RAW DEAL
- 2018 - The Man Who Cheated Himself-Revisited
- 2019 - A Sedulous Cinderella: Richard Fleischer Remembered
- 2019 - Freeing Trapped
- 2020 - Remembering Fay Wray
- 2020 - Martini Shot: William Atherton and The Day of the Locust
- 2020 - Hollywood Champion: A Tribute to Kirk Douglas
- 2021 - Facemaker: Peter Lorre and The Face Behind the Mask
- 2021 - Zanuck Goes to War: The World War II Films of Fox
- 2021 - Eagle Lion: A Noir-Stained Legacy
- 2022 - John Reinhardt: Direction Without Borders
- 2022 - Jack Wrather: A Legacy of Film and Friendship
- 2022 - The 3 Faces of M
- 2024 - Cornell Woolrich: Fear Has No Borders

As actor

- 2008 - Peril at Sea: Charting a Dangerous Crossing Featurette, Himself
- 2008 - Gene Tierney: Final Curtain for a Noir Icon, Himself
- 2008 - Henry Hathaway: When the Going Gets Tough, Himself
- 2008 - Turning of the Tide: The Ill-Starred Making of Moontide, Himself
- 2008 - The Western Grows Up, Himself
- 2008 - Killer Instincts: Richard Widmark and Ida Lupino at Twentieth Century Fox, Himself
- 2008 - From Journeyman to Artist: Otto Preminger and the Making of Daisy Kenyon, Himself
- 2008 - Arthur Miller: Painter with Light Himself
- 2011 - The Cost of Living: Creating the Prowler, Himself
- 2012 - Michael Curtiz: The Greatest Director You Never Heard Of, Himself
- 2012 - Casablanca: An Unlikely Classic, Himself
- 2013 - Six Geniuses from Budapest, Himself
- 2013 - Eternal History: The Making of From Here to Eternity, Himself
- 2014 - The True Adventures of Raoul Walsh, Himself
- 2016 - Tiger Hunt: Restoring Too Late for Tears, Himself
- 2016 - Love Is a Roller Coaster: Woman on the Run Revisited, Himself
- 2016 - Chance of a Lifetime: The Making of Too Late for Tears, Himself
- 2016 - A Wild Ride: Restoring Woman on the Run, Himself
- 2017 - Master of Noir: The Cinematography of John Alton, Himself
- 2017 - A New Dimension in Noir: Filming Inferno in 3D, Himself
- 2017 - Helming a Masterpiece: Alan K. Rode on the Breaking Point, Himself
- 2017 - Into the Darkness: Mann, Alton and T-Men, Himself
- 2017 - Below the Surface: He Walked by Night, Himself
- 2018 - Dennis O'Keefe: An Extraordinary Ordinary Guy, Himself
- 2018 - Deadly is the Male: The Making of RAW DEAL, Himself
- 2018 - Jean Pierre Melville: A Primer, Himself
- 2018 - The Man Who Cheated Himself-Revisited, Himself
- 2019 - American Frontiers: Anthony Mann at Universal, Himself
- 2019 - Freeing Trapped, Himself
- 2020 - Hollywood Champion A Tribute to Kirk Douglas, Himself
- 2021 - Facemaker: Peter Lorre and The Face Behind the Mask, Himself
- 2021 - Zanuck Goes to War: The World War II Films of Fox, Narrator
- 2021 - Eagle-Lion: A Noir-Stained Legacy, Himself
- 2022 - John Reinhardt: Direction Without Borders, Himself
- 2022 - Jack Wrather: A Legacy of Film and Friendship, Himself
- 2022 - Nightmare: The Life and Films of Cornell Woolrich, Himself
- 2022 - The Three Faces of M, Himself
- 2022 - Rock and Doris (try to) Write A Movie, Man in second restaurant booth
- 2024 - Cornell Woolrich: Fear Has No Borders, Himself
- 2024 - Nom de Plume, Arbuckle Falcon

== Publications ==
- Michael Curtiz: A Life in Film ISBN 978-0-8131739-1-7
- Charles McGraw: Biography of a Film Noir Tough Guy ISBN 978-0-7864717-2-0
- Blood on the Moon (Reel West) ISBN 978-0-8263646-9-2
- Scripts from the Crypt No.15: The Mummy's Curse (contributor) ISBN 979-8-88771-351-9
