= Projectograph =

Hungarian film production and distribution company

Projectograph was a Hungarian film distribution company established in 1908 by Mór Ungerleider and József Neumann. They had originally been cafe owners before switching into the more lucrative business of film screening and distribution. Projectograph came to dominate the Hungarian market during the silent era. While it distributed some Hungarian films made by leading companies such as Corvin Film, Projectograph mostly dealt with the distribution of foreign films. Their principal rival was the French company Pathé, a leading distribution outfit in Central and Eastern Europe. The company's founders both diversified into film production, founding separate companies.

== Bibliography ==
- Cunningham, John. Hungarian Cinema: From Coffee House to Multiplex. Wallflower Press, 2004.
