= Mór Ungerleider =

- Born: January 18, 1872; Mezőlaborc, Slovakia
- Died: April 20, 1955 (aged 83); Budapest, Hungary
- Occupations: Cafe owner, businessman, film producer, and showman

Mór Ungerleider (January 18, 1872, in Mezőlaborc – April 20, 1955, in Budapest) was a Hungarian cafe owner and showman, and was the first person to show cinema in Hungary.

The first film was shot in Hungary in 1896 by Arnold Sziklay. Ungerleider owned the Velence Café in Rákóczi út, a street in Budapest, where he showed films. To begin with, he just projected films in his cafe, but he later adapted his projector to shoot film and in 1898 formed Projectograph with József Neumann. From 1902 to 1923, Ungerleider had 53 producer credits.

He married Janka Glänczer on March 17, 1920.
