= Bela Lugosi filmography =

Béla Lugosi (1882–1956), best known for the original screen portrayal of Bram Stoker's Dracula in 1931, performed in many films during the course of his 39-year film career. He appeared in films made in his native Hungary, Germany and New York before re-locating to Hollywood in 1928. Films are listed in order of release. (see Béla Lugosi for his biography.)

== 1910s ==
This is a list of confirmed film roles Lugosi has performed in. Some films from other filmography sources have not been included here such as Star Film's Casanova (1918), Lulu (1918) and Lili (1917), all of which had announced that Lugosi would appear in them, but Lugosi was apparently dropped from the cast before production began.

| Year | Title | Role | Director(s) | Notes | Ref(s) |
|---|---|---|---|---|---|
| 1917 | Leoni Leo | Leoni Leo | Alfréd Deésy | Billed as Arisztid Olt. | |
| 1917 | Álarcosbál (transl. The Masked Ball) | René | Alfréd Deésy | Billed as Arisztid Olt. Previewed in late October 1917, released on March 11, 1918. | |
| 1918 | Az élet királya (transl. The Royal Life) | Lord Harry Wotton | Alfréd Deésy | Billed as Arisztid Olt. Previewed on October 23, 1917. Released in January 19, 1918. | |
| 1918 | A Nászdal (transl. The Wedding Song) | Paul Bertram | Alfréd Deésy | Billed as Arisztid Olt | |
| 1918 | A Régiséggyüjtö (transl. The Antiquarian) | An elegant man | Alfréd Deésy | Billed as Arisztid Olt; comedy short. Released on January 28, 1918. | |
| 1918 | Tavaszi vihar (transl. Spring Tempest) | Renner | Alfréd Deésy | Billed as Arisztid Olt. Previewed on March 5, 1918, released on April 22, 1918. | |
| 1918 | Küzdelem a létért (transl. The Struggle for Life) | Pal Orlay | Alfréd Deésy | Billed as Arisztid Olt. Previewed on July 16, 1918, released on September 23, 1918. | |
| 1918 | 99-es számú bérkocsi | Charlie Layton | Michael Curtiz | Released on August 31, 1918. | |
| 1918 | Az ezredes (transl. The Colonel) | The Colonel | Michael Curtiz | Released on December 30, 1918. | |

== 1920s ==
| Year | Title | Role | Director(s) | Notes | Ref(s) |
|---|---|---|---|---|---|
| 1920 | Hypnose: Sklaven fremden Willens (transl. Hypnosis: Slave of a Foreign Will) | Professor Mors. | Richard Eichberg | Later released as Sklaven fremden Willens. Premiered January 1920 | |
| 1920 | Daughter of the Night | Andre Fleurot | Richard Eichberg | Released in Germany (as Der Tanz auf dem Vulkan) in two parts: Sybil Joung and Der Tod Des Grobfirsten. First part premiered in February 1920. | |
| 1920 | Der Januskopf | Butler | F. W. Murnau | Originally screened as Schrecken. Previewed in April 1920. Premiered on August 26, 1920. | |
| 1920 | Der Fluch der Menschheit (The Curse of Man) | Malzer | Richard Eichberg | Released in two Parts: Die Tochter der Arbeit and Im Rausche der Milliarden. Premiered in September 1920. | |
| 1920 | Das ganze Sein ist flammend Leid (transl. All Existence is a Flaming Sorrow) | Unknown role | Ottmar Ostermayr | Premiered in September 1920. | |
| 1920 | Auf den Trümmern des Paradieses (On the Brink of Paradise) | Unknown role | Josef Stein | Premiered in October 1920. Received general release in November 1920. | |
| 1920 | Lederstrumpf (Leatherstocking) | Chingachgook | Arthur Wellim | Shown in two parts: as The Deerslayer and Chingachgook and The Last of the Mohicans (1920 German film). Previewed in October, had general release in November 1920. Later released in a condensed version in the U.S. as The Deerslayer. | |
| 1920 | Die Frau im Delphin (The Woman in the Dolphin) | Tom Bill | Arthur Kiekebusch | First screened in November 1920. | |
| 1920 | Die Todeskarawane (Caravan of Death) | Sheik | Josef Stein | Premiered in November 1920. | |
| 1920 | Nat Pinkerton im Kampf (Nat Pinkerton in the Fight) | Gang Leader | Wolfgang Neff | Released in two parts, Das Ende des Artisten Bartolini and Diebesfallen. Lugosi only appears in the first part. | |
| 1920 | Die Teufelsanbeter (The Devil Worshippers) | Unknown role | Marie Louise Droop, Muhsin Ertuğrul | | |
| 1920 | John Hopkins the Third | Cowboy | Wolfgang Neff | German: Die verschwundene Million | |
| 1921 | Der Sklavenhalter von Kansas-City (transl. The Slaveholder of Kansas City) | George Corvin | Wolfgang Neff | Premiered in 1920, earliest known public screenings in February 1921. | |
| 1922 | Asszonyszivek kalandora (transl. The Adventurer of Women's Hearts) | Title character | —N/a | A two-act short feature film, possibly edited down from an earlier film. | |
| 1923 | Ihre Hoheit die Tänzerin (transl. Her Highness, the Dancer) | Unknown role | Richard Eichberg and Fritz Bernhardt | title changed in 1923 to Der Leidensweg der Eva Grunwald (transl. The Ordeal of Eva Grunwald) by the censors, but was unable to be released | |
| 1923 | The Silent Command | Benedict Hisston | J. Gordon Edwards | Filmed in New York; Lugosi's 1st American film | |
| 1924 | The Rejected Woman | Jean Gagnon | Albert Parker | | |
| 1925 | The Midnight Girl | Nicholas Harmon | Wilfred Noy | | |
| 1925 | Daughters Who Pay | Serge Romonsky | George Terwilleger | | |
| 1926 | Punchinello | Pierrot, a harlequin | Duncan Renaldo | Later rereleased in Color as The Mask | |
| 1928 | How to Handle Women | Bodyguard | William J. Kraft | | |
| 1929 | The Veiled Woman | Nanon's Suitor | Emmett Flynn | | |
| 1929 | Prisoners | Brottos | William A. Seiter | | |
| 1929 | The Thirteenth Chair | Inspector Delzante | Tod Browning | | |
| 1929 | The Last Performance | Erik the Great | Paul Fejos | Lugosi dubbed Conrad Veidt's English-speaking character into Hungarian in the Hungarian version only. Released in Hungary approximately around February 1930. | |

== 1930s ==
| Year | Title | Role | Director(s) | Notes | Ref(s) |
|---|---|---|---|---|---|
| 1930 | Such Men Are Dangerous | Dr. Goodman | Kenneth Hawks | | |
| 1930 | Wild Company | Felix Brown | Leo McCarey | | |
| 1930 | King of Jazz | Himself | John Murray Anderson | Lugosi appears as the Hungarian-language host in the Hungarian version only. Released in Hungary on September 6, 1930. Filmed in Technicolor. | |
| 1930 | Renegades | Sheik Muhammad Halid, the Marabout | Victor Fleming | | |
| 1930 | Viennese Nights | Count von Ratz, an ambassador | Alan Crosland | Filmed in Technicolor. | |
| 1930 | Oh, For a Man! | Frescatti, a singing teacher | Harold McFadden | | |
| 1931 | Dracula | Count Dracula | Tod Browning | | |
| 1931 | 50 Million Frenchmen | Orizon, the magician | Lloyd Bacon | Filmed in Technicolor (only black and white prints survive). | |
| 1931 | Women of All Nations | Prince Hassan | Raoul Walsh | | |
| 1931 | The Black Camel | Tarneverro, a fortune teller | Hamilton MacFadden | | |
| 1931 | Broadminded | Pancho Arango | Mervyn LeRoy | | |
| 1932 | Murders in the Rue Morgue | Dr. Mirakle | Robert Florey | | |
| 1932 | White Zombie | "Murder" Legendre | Victor Halperin | | |
| 1932 | Chandu the Magician | Roxor | Marcel Varnel, William Cameron Menzies | | |
| 1932 | Island of Lost Souls | Sayer of the Law | Erle C. Kenton | | |
| 1932 | The Death Kiss | Joseph Steiner | Edwin L. Marin | | |
| 1933 | The Whispering Shadow | Professor Adam Strang | Colbert Clark; Albert Herman | 12-chapter serial | |
| 1933 | Night of Terror | Degar, a Hindu servant | Benjamin Stoloff | | |
| 1933 | International House | General Nicholas Branovsky Petronovich | A. Edward Sutherland | | |
| 1933 | The Devil's in Love | Military Prosecutor | William Dieterle | Uncredited | |
| 1934 | The Black Cat | Dr. Vitus Werdegast | Edgar G. Ulmer | | |
| 1934 | Gift of Gab | Apache | Karl Freund | | |
| 1934 | The Return of Chandu | Chandu | Ray Taylor | Film serial later edited into two features: Return of Chandu (1934) and Chandu on the Magic Island (1935). | |
| 1934 | The Mysterious Mr. Wong | Mr. Wong | William Nigh | | |
| 1935 | The Best Man Wins | Dr. Boehm | Erle C. Kenton | | |
| 1935 | Mark of the Vampire | Count Mora | Tod Browning | | |
| 1935 | The Raven | Dr. Richard Vollin | Lew Landers | | |
| 1935 | Murder by Television | Arthur Perry/Professor Houghland's Assistant | Clifford Sanforth | | |
| 1935 | The Mystery of the Mary Celeste | Anton Lorenzen | Denison Clift | Released in the U.S. in a shorter form as Phantom Ship | |
| 1936 | The Invisible Ray | Dr. Felix Benet | Lambert Hillyer | | |
| 1936 | Postal Inspector | Gregory Benez | Otto Brower | | |
| 1936 | Shadow of Chinatown | Victor Poten | Robert F. Hill | 15-chapter serial, also released as a feature film | |
| 1937 | S.O.S. Coast Guard | Foreign agent Boroff | Alan James; William Witney | 12-chapter Film serial also released in 1942 as a 69-minute feature version | |
| 1939 | Son of Frankenstein | Ygor | Rowland V. Lee | | |
| 1939 | The Gorilla | Peters, the butler | Allan Dwan | | |
| 1939 | The Phantom Creeps | Dr. Alex Zorka | Ford Beebe; Saul A. Goodkind | 12-chapter Film serial also released as a feature film | |
| 1939 | The Dark Eyes of London | Dr. Orloff, Dr. Dearborn | Walter Summers | Released in U.S. as The Human Monster | |
| 1939 | Ninotchka | Commissar Razinin | Ernst Lubitsch | | |

== 1940s ==
| Year | Title | Role | Director(s) | Notes | Ref(s) |
|---|---|---|---|---|---|
| 1940 | The Saint's Double Trouble | The Partner | Jack Hively | | |
| 1940 | Black Friday | Eric Marnay | Arthur Lubin | | |
| 1940 | You'll Find Out | Prince Saliano, a fortune teller | David Butler | | |
| 1940 | The Devil Bat | Dr. Paul Carruthers | Jean Yarborough | | |
| 1940 | Fantasia | N/A | Various | Lugosi was hired as a model for the demon in this animated film, but his footage was ultimately not used | |
| 1941 | Invisible Ghost | Dr. Charles Kessler | Joseph H. Lewis | | |
| 1941 | The Black Cat | Eduardo Vitos | Albert S. Rogell | | |
| 1941 | Spooks Run Wild | Nardo | Phil Rosen | | |
| 1941 | The Wolf Man | Bela | George Waggner | | |
| 1942 | Black Dragons | Dr. Melcher/Monsieur Colomb | William Nigh | | |
| 1942 | The Ghost of Frankenstein | Ygor | Erle C. Kenton | | |
| 1942 | S.O.S. Coast Guard | Boroff | | Feature version of the 1937 serial | |
| 1942 | The Corpse Vanishes | Dr. Lorenz | Wallace Fox | | |
| 1942 | Night Monster | Rolf | Ford Beebe | | |
| 1942 | Bowery at Midnight | Professor Brenner and Karl Wagner | Wallace Fox | | |
| 1943 | Frankenstein Meets the Wolf Man | Frankenstein Monster | Roy William Neill | | |
| 1943 | The Ape Man | Dr. James Brewster | William Beaudine | | |
| 1943 | Ghosts on the Loose | Emil | William Beaudine | | |
| 1943 | The Return of the Vampire | Count Armand Tesla/Dr. Hugo Bruckner | Lew Landers | | |
| 1944 | Voodoo Man | Dr. Richard Marlowe | William Beaudine | | |
| 1944 | Return of the Ape Man | Prof. Dexter | Philip Rosen | | |
| 1944 | One Body Too Many | Merkil, the butler | Frank Mcdonald | | |
| 1945 | Zombies on Broadway | Dr. Paul Renault | Gordon Douglas | | |
| 1945 | The Body Snatcher | Joseph | Robert Wise | | |
| 1946 | Genius at Work | Stone | Leslie Goodwins | | |
| 1947 | Scared to Death | Professor Leonide | Christy Cabanne | Filmed in Cinecolor. | |
| 1948 | Abbott and Costello Meet Frankenstein | Count Dracula | Charles Barton | | . |

== 1950s ==
| Year | Title | Role | Director(s) | Notes | Ref(s) |
|---|---|---|---|---|---|
| 1952 | Mother Riley Meets the Vampire | Von Houssen | John Gilling | Released as both Vampire Over London and My Son, the Vampire in the United States | |
| 1952 | Bela Lugosi Meets a Brooklyn Gorilla | Dr. Zabor | William Beaudine | aka The Boys From Brooklyn | |
| 1953 | Glen or Glenda | Spirit/Narrator | Ed Wood | | |
| 1955 | Bride of the Monster | Dr. Eric Vornoff | Ed Wood | | |
| 1956 | The Black Sleep | Casimir, the butler | Reginald Le Borg | Re-released in 1963 as Dr. Cadman's Secret | |
| 1957 | Plan 9 from Outer Space | The Ghoul Man | Ed Wood | (archival footage) released posthumously | |
| 1959 | Lock Up Your Daughters | Himself | Phil Rosen | (stock footage) released posthumously in UK only | |

== Television/Radio ==
- Intimate Interviews (1932) interviewed on radio by Dorothy West
- Hollywood on Parade No. A-8 (1933) a 10-minute comedy skit/ short subject with Bonnie Poe as Betty Boop
- Universal's Black Cat Contest (March 1934) this newsreel showed Karloff and Lugosi trying to pick the winner of Universal's "Black Cat Contest"
- Screen Snapshots Episode 34 (1934) this newsreel shows Lugosi playing chess with Boris Karloff
- Hollywood Movie Parade (1934) a short featurette co-starring Jackie Cooper
- Baker's Broadcast (1937) Lugosi and Karloff sang "We're Horrible, Horrible Men" on this radio show with Ozzie and Harriet
- Texaco Star Theater (Nov. 15, 1939) Lugosi appeared with Burgess Meredith on this "Dracula on Sunnybrook Farm" radio episode
- Black Friday Newsreel (Jan. 18, 1940) - Lugosi shown being hypnotized by his friend Manly Hall for his death scene in Black Friday (1940); film is lost
- Kay Kayser Radio Show (Sept. 25, 1940) with Karloff and Peter Lorre
- The Milton Berle Show TV show (mid-1940s) Texaco Star Theatre
- Play Broadcast Quiz Program (May 2, 1941) Chicago radio show
- Screen Snapshots (1943) Lugosi is shown in this newsreel donating blood during World War II
- Suspense Radio Show (Feb. 2, 1943) episode called "The Doctor Prescribed Death"
- Texaco Star Theater: The Fred Allen Show (Apr. 25, 1943) Lugosi did a radio comedy sketch with Fred Allen
- Mail Call (March 11, 1944) Lugosi appeared with Orson Welles and Edward Everett Horton on this radio show
- Mystery House Radio (1944) Lugosi was to host a syndicated radio series; a pilot was apparently made with Lugosi and John Carradine called "The Thirsty Death", but it is unknown if it ever aired; the program is considered lost.
- Which Is Which? Radio Show (Feb. 14, 1945) with host Ken Murray
- Country Fair Radio Show (July 31, 1945) with host Jack Bailey
- Command Performance produced by the Armed Forces Radio Service (July 16, 1946) Lugosi did a "Superman" skit with Bob Hope, Paulette Goddard and Sterling Holloway (Lugosi played the villain named Dr. Bekini)
- The Rudy Vallee Show Radio Show (Oct. 22, 1946) Lugosi did a short comedy skit in which he played a vampire called "The Bat"
- Exploring the Unknown Radio Show (Mar. 9, 1947)
- The Adventures of Ellery Queen Radio Show (Mar. 19, 1947) crime drama
- Quick As a Flash Radio Show (May 18, 1947)
- The Bill and Fan Show Albany N.Y. Radio show (Aug. 4, 1947) Lugosi interviewed while at Saratoga Racetrack
- Backstage at the Spa Theater Schenectady TV station (August 6, 1947) Lugosi interview
- Hollywood Soundstage Albany Radio show (Aug. 7, 1947) Lugosi interviewed by Cathy Rice
- Candid Microphone Radio Show (Oct. 24, 1947) starring Alan Funt
- The Guy Lebow Show Radio (Summer, 1948) Lugosi interview
- The Abbott and Costello Show Radio Program (May 5, 1948) Lugosi did a haunted house skit with Lou Costello and Sidney Fields
- The Martha Deane Radio Show N.Y. City radio show (Aug.9, 1948) Lugosi interview
- Variety Show Los Angeles TV show (Aug. 18, 1948) Lugosi appeared in a pre-filmed TV special
- Night of Stars Event Madison Square Garden, NY (Nov. 15, 1948) appeared live with Boris Karloff and Peter Lorre in support of Israel
- Herb Shrimer Time WCBS Radio, NYC (Nov. 22, 1948)
- Surprise Theater Los Angeles TV show (Aug. 31, 1949) broadcast an episode starring Lugosi
- Tales of Fatima N.Y. Radio show (Sept. 10, 1949) appeared with Basil Rathbone in "Man in the Shadows" (radio play)
- Art Linkletter's House Party N.Y. Radio show (Oct. 6, 1949) Lugosi interview
- Suspense N.Y. TV show (episode "The Cask of Amontillado" October 11, 1949) as General Fortunato
- Texaco Star Theatre TV show (Oct. 27, 1949) Lugosi wears his cape and attempts to hypnotize Milton Berle in a skit; co-starred Olsen and Johnson; this 60-minute program exists today on DVD
- Crime Does Not Pay N.Y. Radio show (Dec. 12, 1949) Lugosi plays a demented arsonist named Nick Segadin in "Gasoline Cocktail" episode (prerecorded)
- Celebrity Time N.Y. TV show with Arlene Francis (January 22, 1950) this show was rerun on Dec. 22, 1950
- Bonnie Maid Versatile Varieties N.Y. TV show (January 27, 1950)
- Starlit Time (May 21, 1950) Lugosi appeared on this musical-variety TV show
- Little Old New York WPIX-TV show (June 1, 1950) starring Ed Sullivan
- The Bill Slater Show WOR-TV show (June 7, 1950)
- Candid Microphone CBS Radio Show (June 27, 1950) starring Allen Funt
- Murder and Bela Lugosi WPIX-TV show (Sept. 18, 1950) Lugosi did this one-hour program in which he provided the commentary about a number of his old horror films while clips were shown; historian Gary Rhodes thinks some of this "Lugosi host" footage found its way into the 1959 British Lugosi film Lock Up Your Daughters (a lost film today) (click section "1940-1959" on source page)
- The Paul Winchell Show N.Y. TV (Oct. 2, 1950) as Count Dracula
- The Robert Q. Lewis Show (shown Dec. 24, 1950) CBS-TV, Bela meets Santa Claus skit
- Okay, Mother ABC Radio Show (December 28, 1950) Lillian Lugosi was interviewed by Dennis James
- The Betty Crocker Magazine Show of the Air Radio Show (Jan. 29, 1951)
- The Johnny Olson Luncheon Club Radio Show (Feb. 7, 1951)
- Bela Lugosi's Horror and Magic Stage Show (Dec. 16, 1950 - March 17, 1951) (traveled throughout NY and NJ)
- Crime Does Not Pay Radio Show (Feb. 18, 1951) Episode called Gasoline Cocktail (a rerun)
- The Charlie Chester Show recorded in England (April 14, 1951) BBC-TV
- Ship’s Reporter (December 11, 1951) Lugosi shipboard interview by Jack Mangan upon his return from England; this newsreel was aired around Christmastime
- The House of Wax Premiere (April 16, 1953) appeared live in front of the Paramount Theater when the film premiered in L.A.; some footage of the event appeared in a Pathe newsreel released theatrically on April 27, 1953.
- You Asked For It California TV show (July 27, 1953) performed his "Vampire Illusion"; rebroadcast on East Coast Aug. 9, 1953
- The Spade Cooley Show (KTLA Radio, Halloween, 1953) Lugosi guest-starred with comedian Ukie Sherin (Lugosi's dialogue director on the film Bela Lugosi Meets a Brooklyn Gorilla).
- The Red Skelton Show (June, 1954) co-starring Lon Chaney Jr. and Maila (Vampira) Nurmi; Ed Wood was there and acted as Lugosi's dialogue coach backstage
- Metropolitan State Hospital Interview (August 1, 1955) interview filmed upon his medical release
- The Tom Duggan Show (Summer, 1956) Lugosi was interviewed about his drug addiction and cure
- The Black Sleep Theatrical Premiere (appeared live at the theatre on June 27, 1956)
- Lugosi, The Forgotten King (a 1985 documentary)

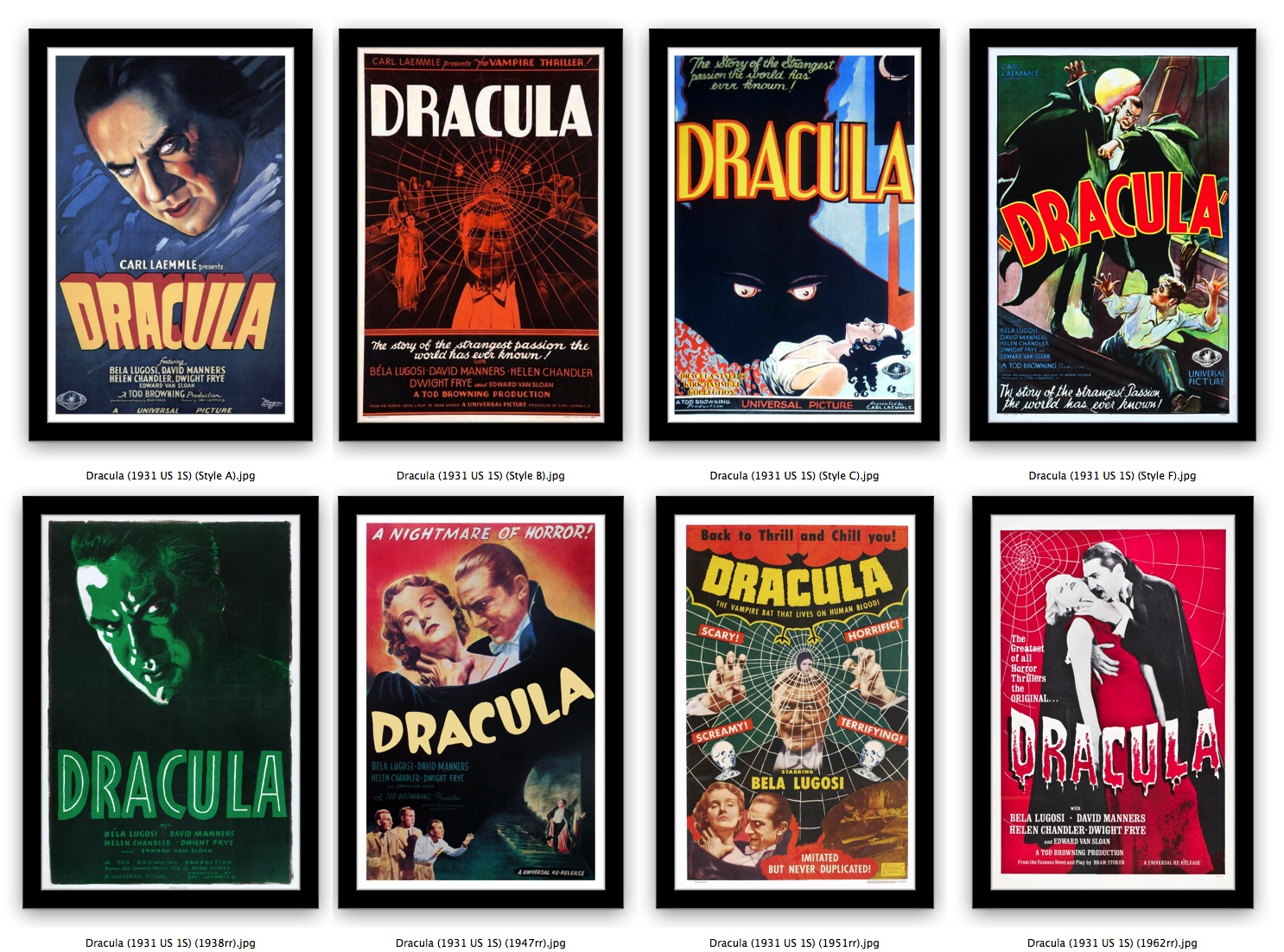

== Stage Play credits (in U.S. only) ==
(Note* - Lugosi appeared in at least 172 plays in his native Hungary between 1902 and 1918)

- Little Miss Bluebeard (June, 1921) - Lugosi and his 2nd wife Ilona von Montagh met while co-starring in this NY City play, performed in Hungarian language
- Torveny (The Law) - Lugosi and Ilona von Montagh co-starred in this Hungarian language play in Bridgeport, Connecticut in September 1921 (Lugosi directed the play as well)
- Liliom - Lugosi and von Montagh co-starred in this Hungarian language play in NY City in September 1921; the two were married that month60
- Sarga Liliom - (late 1921) performed in New York in Hungarian language
- Getto (February 1922) performed in New York in Hungarian language; also directed by Lugosi
- A demarkacio szinmu (circa March 1922) - performed in New York in Hungarian language
- The Tragedy of Man - opened April 8, 1922 (N.Y. City) Lugosi played Adam and also directed this play in Hungarian language; co-starred Ilona von Montagh
- The Red Poppy - opened Dec 20, 1922 (Greenwich Village) in his first English language play, Lugosi starred as Fernando; co-starred Estelle Winwood and Arthur Lubin.
- Die Sorina (November 1923) performed at Columbia University in N.Y. City in Hungarian language; Lugosi also directed this play
- The Right to Dream (1924) Lugosi was contracted to direct this N.Y. play by producer Irving Davis, but Davis quickly fired him after deeming him not talented enough; Lugosi sued Davis in court on May 21, 1924, for breach of contract, but lost the case.
- The Werewolf - opened June 1, 1924 (Chicago) Lugosi left this play after only one week (played Vincente, a butler)
- Forradalmi nasz (February 1925) performed in N.Y. City in the Hungarian language
- Arabesque - Oct 20, 1925 - Nov 07, 1925 (N.Y. City); played an Arab sheik
- Open House - Dec 14, 1925 - Feb 10, 1926 (N.Y. City); played Sergius Chernoff, a Russian
- The Devil in the Cheese - Dec 29, 1926 - May 1927 (N.Y. City) played both Father Petros and Cardos the bandit; co-starred Fredric March and Dwight Frye; 165 performances
- Dracula - Oct 05, 1927 - May 19, 1928 (N.Y. City) as Dracula; co-starred Edward Van Sloan and Bernard Jukes as Renfield
- Dracula - June 24, 1928 - Sept. 15, 1928 (Los Angeles, San Francisco, Oakland) with Bernard Jukes as Renfield; Lugosi relocated to California in 1928.
- Dracula - May 19, 1929 - Aug. 17, 1929 (Los Angeles, San Francisco, Oakland) with Harry Walker as Renfield; all told 265 performances
- Murdered Alive - April 2, 1932 - May 5, 1932 (Los Angeles, San Francisco, Los Angeles) played Dr. Orloff, a mad sculptor
- Dracula - May 29, 1932 - June 5, 1932 (Portland, Oregon) with Perry Ivins as Renfield (who also directed the play)
- Murder at the Vanities - Sep 8, 1933 - Mar 10, 1934 (N.Y. City) played Siebenkase; co-starred Olga Baclanova and Robert Cummings; 298 performances
- Tovarich - opened Mar. 22, 1937 - May 15, 1937 (San Francisco, Los Angeles) played Commissar Gorotchenko
- Stardust Cavalcade Revue - March 30, 1940 to May 2, 1940 (Ohio, Pennsylvania, Connecticut, New York City and Washington DC) toured with Ed Sullivan and Arthur Treacher (Lugosi appeared again in several summer tours reprising scenes from Dracula between 1940 and 1946.
- One Night of Horror - May 2–8, 1941 (Chicago) a spook show Lugosi put on for the premiere of his film, The Invisible Ghost
- Dracula - opened April 30, 1943 - June 26, 1943 (East Coast tour/ Plymouth/ Boston)
- Arsenic and Old Lace - Aug. 5, 1943 - Sept. 22, 1943 (San Francisco, Los Angeles) played Jonathan Brewster
- Arsenic and Old Lace - Jan. 29, 1944 - June 3, 1944 (East Coast tour) played Jonathan Brewster
- No Traveler Returns - Feb. 26, 1945 - March 19, 1945 (San Francisco, Seattle) played Bharat Singh, a Hindu servant; co-starred Ian Keith
- That We May Live - Dec. 17–18, 1946 - a two-day show at the Los Angeles Shrine Auditorium
- A Nightmare of Horror - Feb. 7–8, 1947 (San Diego) a two-night spook show held at San Diego's Orpheum Theater
- Three Indelicate Ladies - April 10, 1947 - April 19, 1947 (New Haven, Boston) played Francis O'Rourke, co-starred Ray Walston
- Arsenic and Old Lace - June 30, 1947 - July 5, 1947 (Pennsylvania) played Jonathan Brewster
- Dracula - July 14, 1947 - Aug. 2, 1947 (Connecticut, Long Island, Massachusetts, Pennsylvania, Connecticut) co-starred Simon Oakland as Van Helsing and Ray Walston as Renfield in some towns
- Arsenic and Old Lace - Aug. 5, 1947 - Aug. 10, 1947 (Sarasota Springs, N.Y.) with Richard Boone as a policeman
- Bill Neff's Madhouse of Mystery - mid-1947 (California) - a spook show play in which Lugosi appeared at various movie theaters
- The Tell-Tale Heart - Nov. 19, 1947 - Dec. 23, 1947 (Illinois, Wisconsin, Michigan) a 40-minute one-man spook show scripted by Lugosi's agent Don Marlowe (consisting of Lugosi doing a monologue with a beating heart heard throughout); apparently Marlowe made a 16-inch transcription disc recording of the show, which is today considered lost.
- Promotional Appearances for Abbott and Costello Meet Frankenstein (June 1948) appeared in a live stage act with Glenn Strange dressed as the Monster (L.A., San Francisco and San Diego)
- Dracula July 8, 1948 - Aug. 7, 1948 (Colorado, Pennsylvania, Connecticut)
- Arsenic and Old Lace - August 9, 1948 - August 14, 1948 (Sea Cliff, NJ) Lugosi first met producers Richard and Alex Gordon at this show
- The Bela Lugosi Company Vaudeville Show - Aug. 20, 1948 -Oct. 29, 1948 (Detroit, Miami and Atlantic City) a traveling vaudeville act put on at various movie theaters
- Nightmare of Horror Stage Show (early 1949) appeared with Glenn Strange, as Dracula and the Frankenstein Monster (San Diego, Los Angeles)
- Arsenic and Old Lace - July 11, 1949 - Aug. 21, 1949 (New York, New Jersey, Connecticut, Pennsylvania)
- The Bela Lugosi Company Vaudeville Show - Nov. 16 - Nov. 23, 1949 (St. Louis, Wichita) - a traveling vaudeville act in which Lillian Lugosi played a small role onstage (the hypnotized maid in a "Dracula" skit)
- Dracula - Mar. 20, 1950 - March 25, 1950 (St. Petersburg, Florida); July 4, 1950 - July 7, 1950 (Vermont)
- The Devil Also Dreams - July 24, 1950 - August 26, 1950 (Massachusetts, New York, Canada) played the butler Alexander Petofy
- Bela Lugosi's Horror and Magic Stage Show - Dec. 6, 1950 - March, 1951 (New York, New Jersey) - a traveling vaudeville act that ended when Lugosi had to leave for England in April
- Dracula - Apr. 30, 1951 - mid-September, 1951 (England) Lugosi and Lillian toured England in this low-budget production in 1951
- Arsenic and Old Lace - Jan. 19, 1954 - Jan. 25, 1954 (St. Louis)
- The Bela Lugosi Revue (Feb. 19, 1954 - Mar. 27, 1954) a one-hour stage act (performed at least 3 times per day) at the Silver Slipper Saloon, Las Vegas; directed and co-written by Ed Wood
- The Devil's Paradise - June 8, 1956 - June 9, 1956 (Los Angeles) Lugosi plays an unnamed narcotics smuggler
