= Sannom =

Sannom is a Danish surname.

Notable people with the surname Sannom include:

- Charlotte Sannom (1846–1923), Danish painter
- Emilie Sannom (1886–1931), Danish actress
