= Camilla von Hollay =

Hungarian actress (1899–1967)

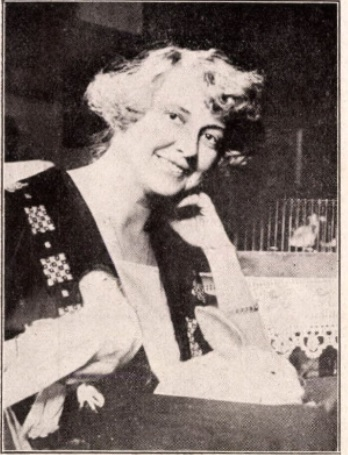
- von Hollay in 1929
- Born: 11 July 1899; Budapest, Austria-Hungary
- Died: 9 February 1967 (aged 67); Budapest
- Occupation: Actress
- Years active: 1917–1930

Camilla von Hollay (born Kamilla Borbála Hollay; 11 July 1899 – 9 February 1967) was a Hungarian film actress of the silent era.

== Selected filmography ==
* A Régiséggyüjtö (1917)
- Casanova (1918)
- Az Élet királya (1917)
- The Fire Ship (1922)
- The Stolen Professor (1924)
- Passion (1925)
- Madame Wants No Children (1926)
- Superfluous People (1926)
- The Eleven Schill Officers (1926)
- A Sister of Six (1926)
- The Queen of the Baths (1926)
- At the Edge of the World (1927)
- The Weavers (1927)
- The Salvation Army Girl (1927)
- The Standard-Bearer of Sedan (1927)
- Break-in (1927)
- Potsdam (1927)
- The Duty to Remain Silent (1928)
- The Green Alley (1928)
- When the Mother and the Daughter (1928)
- Immorality (1928)
- The Saint and Her Fool (1928)
- The Abduction of the Sabine Women (1928)
- The Beaver Coat (1928)
- Waterloo (1929)
- The Unusual Past of Thea Carter
- The Great Longing (1930)
- Retreat on the Rhine (1930)
- Love and Champagne (1930)
- The Tender Relatives (1930)
