= The Woman in the Dolphin =

1920 film

- Directed by: Artur Kiekebusch-Brenken
- Written by: Jan Gramatzki
- Starring: Bela Lugosi; Magnus Stifter; Emilie Sannom
- Cinematography: Karl Freund
- Production company: Gaci Film
- Release date: 3 November 1920
- Country: Germany
- Language: Silent

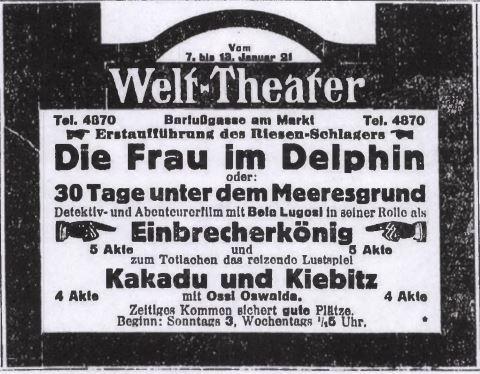
German advertisement for The Woman in the Dolphin

The Woman in the Dolphin (German: Die Frau im Delphin) is a 1920 silent German film directed by Artur Kiekebusch-Brenken for Gaci Film, written by Jan Gramatzki and featuring Bela Lugosi. The camerawork was handled by Karl Freund, who years later was the cinematographer on Lugosi's 1931 Dracula and Universal Pictures' classic The Mummy. A still from the film exists online showing a youthful Lugosi with a very full moustache in this lead role. The film itself is lost.

== Cast ==
- Emilie Sannom as Ellinor Wingord
- Magnus Stifter as Gordon
- Rudolf Hilberg as Fürst
- Bela Lugosi as Tom Bill
- Ernst Pittschau as Harold Holm
- Jacques Wandryck
- Max Zilzer

== See also ==
- Bela Lugosi filmography
