= Ila Lóth =

Hungarian actress (1900–1975)

- Born: Mária Rónai; 28 May 1900; Budapest, Austria-Hungary
- Died: 21 September 1975 (aged 75); Budapest, Hungary
- Occupation: Actress
- Years active: 1918–1973

Ila Lóth, born: Mária Rónai (28 May 1900 – 21 September 1975) was a Hungarian film actress. She appeared in 27 films between 1918 and 1973. She was born in Budapest, Hungary (Austria-Hungary) and died in Budapest. In 1923, she married Győző János Rohoczy Storer. Through her daughter Judit, she is grandmother of an actress Sunnyi Melles, Princess of Sayn-Wittgenstein-Sayn.

== Selected filmography ==
- Az Élet királya (1917)
- Lili (1918)
- Küzdelem a létért (1918)
- Casanova (1918)
- Yamata (1919)
- Under the Mountains (1920)
- For Love and Crown (1922)
- Déryné (1951)
- Dani (1957)
- The Poor Rich (1959)
- The Healing Water (1967)
