= Lock Up Your Daughters =

Lock Up Your Daughters may refer to:

- Lock Up Your Daughters (musical), a musical based on an 18th-century comedy Rape Upon Rape
- Lock Up Your Daughters (1959 film), a horror film
- Lock Up Your Daughters (1969 film), a British historical comedy film
- "Lock Up Your Daughters" (song), a 1981 single from rock band Slade
