= Erzsi Galambos =

Hungarian actress (1931–2023)

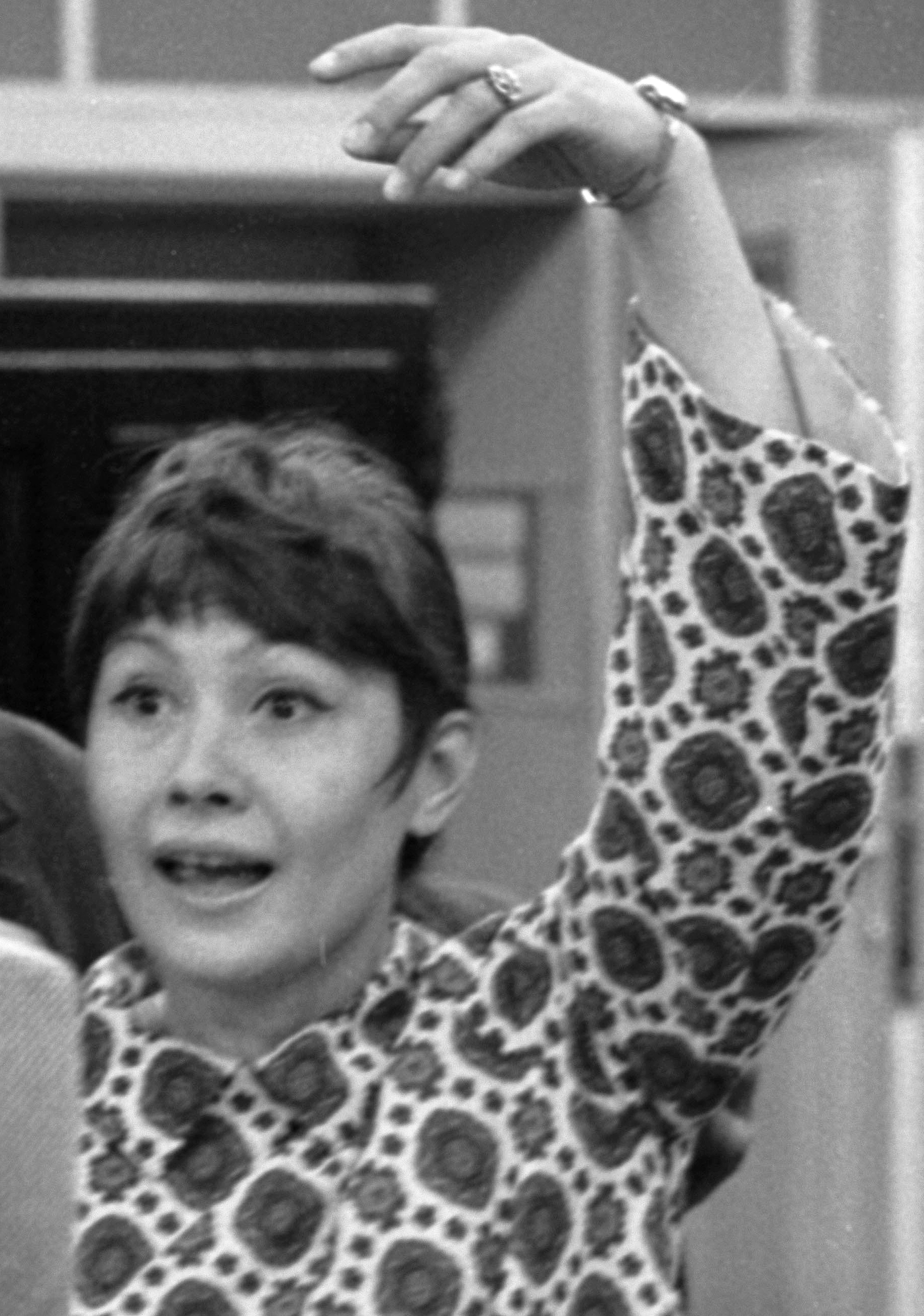
- Galambos in 1965
- Born: 5 December 1931; Budapest, Kingdom of Hungary
- Died: 16 November 2023 (aged 91)
- Occupation: Actress
- Years active: 1958–2018 (film)

Erzsi Galambos (5 December 1931 – 16 November 2023) was a Hungarian stage, film and television actress. She was married to the actor Attila Nagy.

== Selected filmography ==
- A Quiet Home (1958)
- Mindennap élünk (1963)
- Lady-Killer in Trouble (1964)

== Bibliography ==
- Fekete, Márton. Prominent Hungarians: Home and Abroad. Szepsi Csombor Literary Circle, 1979.
- Wildbihler, Hubert. Musicals! Musicals!: ein internationaler Führer zu 850 Musicals und 3000 Tonträgern. Musicalarchiv Wildbihler, 1992.
