= Drakula halála =

1920s film by Károly Lajthay

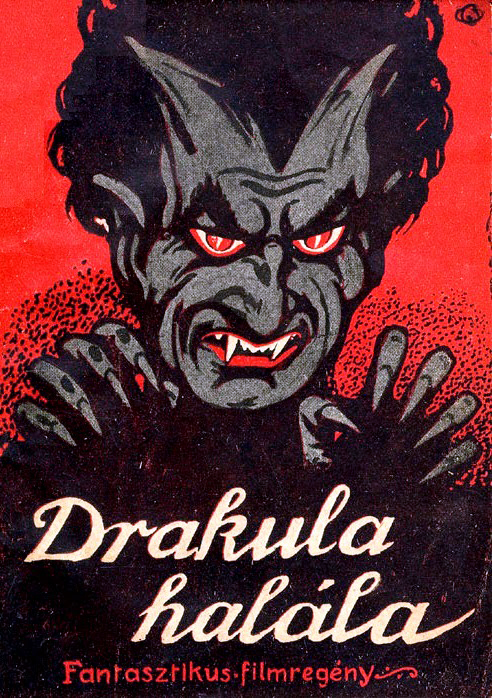
- Cover of the film's novel adaptation.
- Directed by: Károly Lajthay
- Written by: Károly Lajthay; Michael Curtiz
- Starring: Paul Askonas; Margit Lux; Carl Goetz; Aladar Ihasz; Lajos Rethey
- Cinematography: Eduard Hoesch; Lajos Gasser
- Production company: Lapa Film Studio
- Running time: 1,448 meters
- Country: Austria

Drakula halála (transl. Dracula's Death) is an Austrian silent film that was co-written and directed by Károly Lajthay. The film was the first appearance of Count Dracula from Bram Stoker's novel Dracula (1897), though the film does not follow the plot of the novel.

Production went from 1920 to 1921. The film allegedly premiered in Vienna in 1921, though no information regarding this has been found in Austria trade publications, and was released in Hungary in 1923. The film is considered lost, with only four publicity photographs of the film and a novel adaptation of the film surviving. In 2024, an attempt to remake the film was published, based on surviving information about the original.

== Plot ==
Note: As this film is considered lost, exact plot details are difficult to determine. This plot summary is based on an adaptation of the film which was published in the form of a short novel. While this adaptation has been described as "evidently intended to be quite faithful", its exact accuracy to the film remains uncertain.

Mary Land, a poor seamstress, visits her dying father in an insane asylum. While there, Mary encounters an inmate who insists he is the immortal Dracula. Mary's father dies, and she is invited to spend the night at the asylum. In the night, Dracula abducts Mary to his castle and forces her to attend a wedding ceremony. At the end of the ceremony, Mary uses a cross to repel Dracula and escapes the castle.

Mary is found by some locals who take her home and send for a doctor. After some days treating Mary, the doctor is forced to leave to tend to an injury. The doctor is taken on a strange and dangerous route, and his sleigh driver admits to having been bribed to take him this way by a man whose description matches Dracula. Back at the house, a fallen lamp sets Mary's room on fire, forcing her to flee.

At this point, Mary wakes up back at the asylum, unsure if her ordeal was real or merely a dream. The inmates gather in the asylum's garden, where one of them produces a loaded revolver. Seeking a chance to prove his immortality, Dracula asks the man to shoot him. The bullet hits Dracula's heart, killing him. George, Mary's fiancé, arrives at the asylum to collect her. As nurses are carrying Dracula's body, a notebook falls from his pocket entitled "Diary of My Immortal Life and Adventures", which a frightened Mary tells George to discard.

== Cast ==
- Paul Askonas as Drakula
- Margit Lux as Märy
- Dezső Kertész as George
- Elemér Thury as The Chief Surgeon
- Lajos Réthey as The Fake Surgeon
- Aladár Ihász as His Assistant
- Carl Goetz as Funny Man

== Production ==
The Hungarian trade publication Képes Mozivilág wrote in 1921, where it was announced as translating the "basic ideas" of Stoker's Dracula (1897). Stoker's book was first published as a serial in Budapesti Hírlap and later published in Hungary as a novel. According to censorship records, the Lapa Film Studio produced Drakula halála. The director of the film was Károly Lajthay, whose film career consisted mostly of directing and acting. Lajthay visited Budapest in order to rent space at Corvin Film Studio for a film with the working title of Drakula. The film was written by Lajthay and Mihály Kertész who had was also a prominent film director in Budapest and became better known as using the name Michael Curtiz, the director of American productions such as Doctor X (1932), Mystery of the Wax Museum (1933) and Casablanca (1942).

Among the crew was Eduard Hoesch, who would shoot Drakula's interiors, though the film's credits suggest he was one of two cinematographers who worked on the film. The other was Lajos Gasser. No surviving records suggest the names of other crew members on the film. Among the cast was Paul Askonas as Drakula. Askonas was a member of the Deutsches Volstheatre in Vienna and had previously acted as Svengali in Trilby (1912), and later appear in films like Hoffmanns Erzählungen (1923) and The Hands of Orlac (1924). Other larger roles in the film included Dezső Kertész who was Mihály's brother, as the young male lead George, and Margit Lux as Mary Land. Lux's role in the film was described by film historian Gary Don Rhodes as "a matter of minor controversy" as the January 1921 issue of Képes Mozivilág stated Lene Myl would play "the role of the heroine." Rhodes found that several publication between 1921 and 1923 stated that Lux played Mary Land, opposed to Myl and stated that "it is definitely Lux who appears with Askonas in a Drakula halála publicity still published in Szinház és Mozi in 1921; its caption specifically credits Lux as portraying Mary." Rhodes went on to note other errors Képes Mozivilág had reported, such as that H. G. Wells had written the novel Dracula.

In December 1920, Lajthay shot some of the film's exteriors in and near Vienna, such as in the village of Melk. Beginning on 2 January 1921, he shot interior scenes at Corvin Film Studio in Budapest and returned to Vienna to shoot additional exteriors in the Wachau valley. During production, the film's title changed to Drakula halála.

== Release ==
Drakula halála allegedly premiered in February 1921, with Szinház és Mozi claiming that the film "held the press premiere in Vienna". However, Gary D. Rhodes states that no information on such a screening has yet surfaced in Austrian trade publications or Vienna newspapers. The film's first known screening in Hungary was on 21 March 1923. According to a "Calendar of Events" listing in the April 1923 issue of Mozi és Film – distributor Jenö officially premiered Drakula halála in Hungary on 14 April 1923. (Note: Some sources list a date of 28 April for this premiere.) Rhodes found no evidence of the film being re-released in either Hungary or Austria and it appears to have vanished from distribution in early 1923.

Since its release, four publicity photographs of the film surfaced in Hungary. Two feature Lene Myl, and the other two are of Askonas as Drakula. The only other item that survives of the feature is a short novella that is reportedly written by Lajos Pánczél, (Note: This authorship is uncertain, with some sources attributing the book to one or both of the film’s writers.) which Rhodes described as a "book-of-the-film".

Publicity photographs and promotional material from Drakula halála
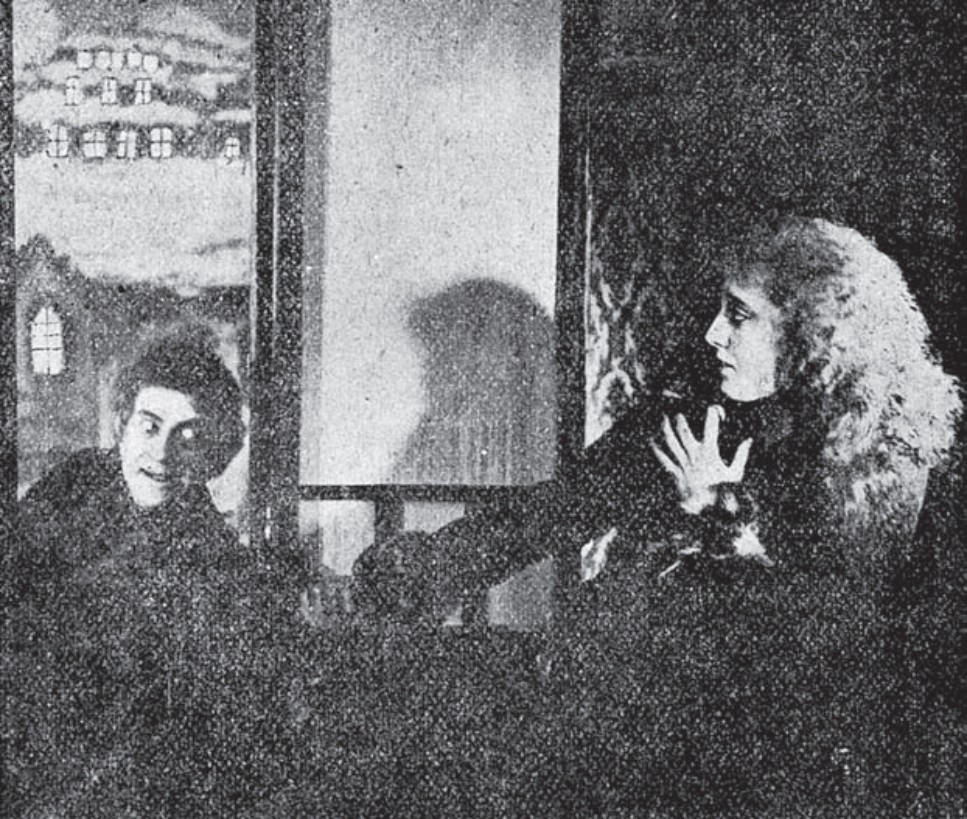
Paul Askonas and Margit Lux in Drakula halála.

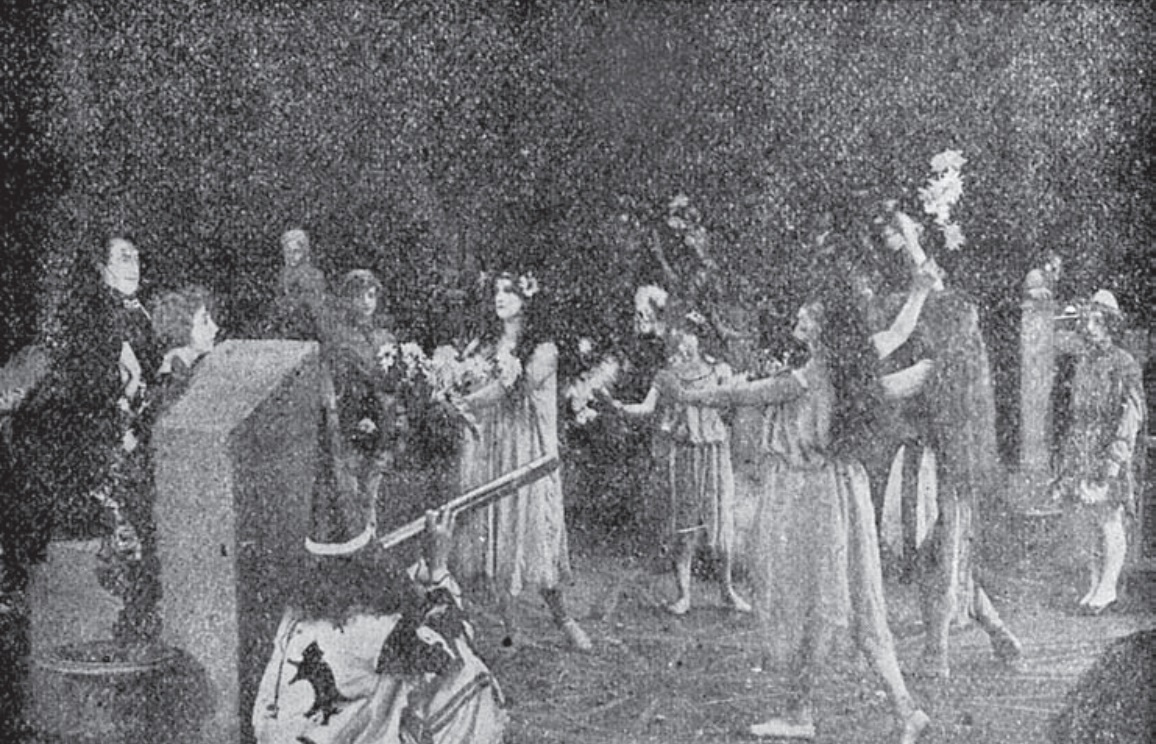
Paul Askonas (left) a still from Drakula halála, which Rhodes describes as likely depicts the wedding between Drakula and Mary Land.

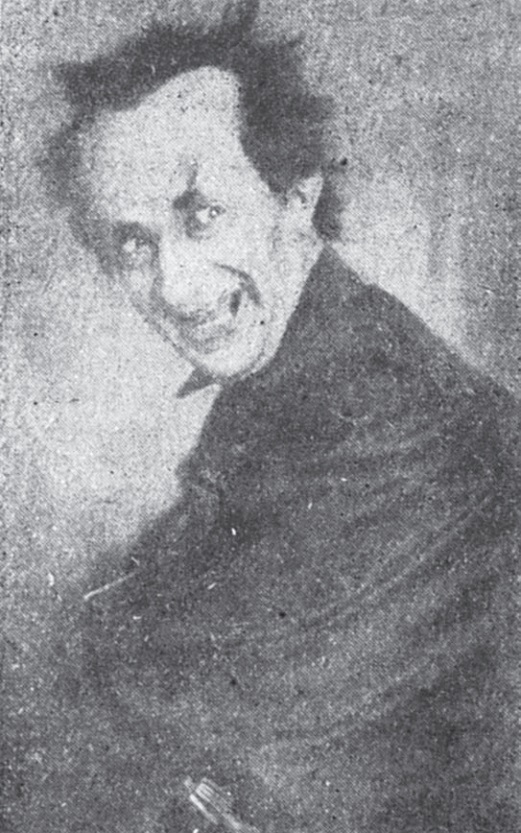
Paul Askonas as Drakula.

== See also ==
- Michael Curtiz filmography
- List of lost films

== Bibliography ==
- Ermida, Isabel (2015). Dracula and the Gothic in Literature, Pop Culture and the Arts. Brill/Rodopi. ISBN 9789004306172.
- Heiss, Lokke (October 1998). "Dracula Unearthed". Cinefantastique. ISSN 0145-6032.
- Rhodes, Gary D. (1 January 2010). "Drakula halála (1921):The Cinema's First Dracula". Horror Studies. 1 (1): 25–47. doi:10.1386/host.1.1.25/1.
- Rhodes, Gary D. (2016). "Drakula halála (1921): The Cinema's First Dracula". In Brill, Olaf; Rhodes, Gary D. (eds.). Expressionism in the Cinema. Edinburgh University Press. ISBN 9781474403269.
- Scivally, Bruce (2015). Dracula FAQ: All That's Left to Know About the Count from Transylvania. Backbeat Books. ISBN 9781617136009.
- Tamasfi, Laszlo (2020). Romero, Erika (ed.). Dracula's Death. Translated by Laszlo Tamasfi. Strangers From Nowhere. ISBN 9781736386613.
