= The Healing Water =

1967 film

- Directed by: Frigyes Bán
- Written by: Nándor Pálfalvi (novel); Miklós Markos
- Produced by: Tibor Dimény; Tibor Hranitzky
- Starring: János Körmendi; Attila Nagy; Mari Szemes
- Cinematography: István Pásztor
- Edited by: Mária Daróczy
- Music by: Iván Patachich
- Production company: Mafilm
- Release date: 26 January 1967
- Running time: 85 minutes
- Country: Hungary
- Language: Hungarian

The Healing Water (Hungarian: Büdösvíz) is a 1967 Hungarian comedy film directed by Frigyes Bán and starring János Körmendi, Attila Nagy and Mari Szemes. It was shot at the Hunnia Studios in Budapest. The film's sets were designed by the art director Melinda Vasáry.

== Synopsis ==
When a mineral water well is discovered in a small village, an entrepreneur has plans to turn it into a major tourist attraction.

== Cast ==
- János Körmendi as Gölöncsér Lali
- Attila Nagy as Szombathy Félix
- Mari Szemes as Terus
- László Bánhidi as Gölöncsér Lajos
- Sándor Tompa as Tanácselnök
- Sándor Deák as Lanka, tsz-elnök
- Edit Soós as Boglárka
- Jenõ Horváth as Vetró
- Gyula Horváth as Agárdy
- Ottó Ruttkai as õrnagy
- János Garics as Paksi
- Tünde Szabó as Annus
- József Petrik as Ezüst elvtárs
- Tibor Puskás as Mérnök
- Antal Farkas
- Lajos Kelemen
- Ila Lóth

== Bibliography ==
- Balski, Grzegorz . Directory of Eastern European Film-makers and Films 1945-1991. Flicks Books, 1992.
- Rîpeanu, Bujor. (ed.) International Directory of Cinematographers, Set- and Costume Designers in Film: Hungary (from the beginnings to 1988). Saur, 1981.
