= The Strength of the Fatherland =

- Directed by: Mihály Kertész
- Starring: Alfréd Deésy
- Release date: 1916
- Country: Hungary
- Language: Hungarian

The Strength of the Fatherland (Hungarian: A magyar föld ereje) is a 1916 Hungarian film directed by Michael Curtiz.
