= The Karthauzer =

- Directed by: Michael Curtiz
- Starring: Alfréd Deésy; Károly Lajthay
- Cinematography: Béla Zsitkovszky
- Release date: 1916
- Country: Hungary
- Language: Silent

The Karthauzer (Hungarian: A Karthausi) is a 1916 Hungarian film directed by Michael Curtiz.

== Cast ==
- Alfréd Deésy
- Károly Lajthay as Armand (as Charles Lederle)

== See also ==
- Michael Curtiz filmography
