= Daughter of the Night (film) =

1920 film

- Directed by: Richard Eichberg
- Screenplay by: Arthur Teuber
- Produced by: Richard Eichberg
- Starring: Lee Parry; Violette Napierska; Robert Scholz
- Cinematography: Joe Rive
- Production company: Eichberg-Film GmbH
- Release date: February 1920
- Running time: Ten reels
- Country: Germany

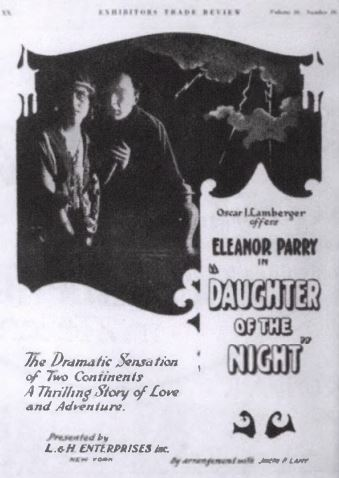
Movie poster for “Daughter of the Night”

Daughter of the Night (German: Der Tanz auf dem Vulkan, lit. 'The Dance on the Volcano') is a German drama film directed by Richard Eichberg. The film is about a French aristocrat (played by Bela Lugosi) who falls in love with a Russian nightclub singer, and his attraction to her involves him in a Russian revolutionary movement.

The ten-reel film was originally shown in Germany as Der Tanz auf dem Vulkan (Dance on the Volcano), released in two parts: as Sybil Joung (transl. Sybil Young) and Der Tod des Großfürsten (transl. The Death of the Grand Duke). It received positive reviews from German publications Film und Brettl and Deutsche Lichtspiel-Zeitung.

A condensed version of the film with English subtitles was released in the United States in 1921, retitled Daughter of the Night. This shortened American print is within the collection of the George Eastman House.

== Cast ==
Cast adapted from Filmportal.de.

- Lee Parry as Tatiana / Marie Dorouska
- Violette Napierska as Die Gräfin Kaminska
- Robert Scholz as Ivan Michelov aka Dimitri
- Bela Lugosi as Andre Fleurot
- Gustav Birkholz as Großfürstin Frederich Dedorovitch
- Felix Hecht as Der Graf Alexander Rostov
- Kurt Fuss

== Release ==
Der Tanz auf dem Vulkan was released in two parts at UFA-Filmpalast in Germany: as Sybil Joung (transl. Sybil Young) and Der Tod des Großfürsten (transl. The Death of the Grand Duke). It premiered in late February 1920.

A shortened version of the film was released in the United States in 1921 as Daughter of the Night. This American print is in the collection of the George Eastman House.

== Reception ==
From contemporary reviews, a reviewer in Film und Brettl stated that director Richard Eichberg "has unquestionably provided proof of his immense talent as director of this two-part cinematic work" noting that "the plot is full of action and in that respect does justice to the medium of film." The Deutsche Lichtspiel-Zeitung also praised the film, finding it a "large-scale production, which merely constitutes a prelude to Part Two, possesses all the qualities of a good commercial picture with international potential."

== See also ==
- Bela Lugosi filmography
- List of rediscovered films
