= For Love and Crown =

1922 film

- Directed by: Franz Osten
- Written by: Hendrik Kerdon
- Cinematography: Franz Planer; Franz Koch
- Production company: Münchner Lichtspielkunst
- Release date: 1922
- Running time: 74 minutes
- Country: Germany
- Languages: Silent; German intertitles

For Love and Crown (German: Um Liebe und Thron) is a 1922 German silent film directed by Franz Osten.

== Cast ==
In alphabetical order

- Emil Fenyő
- Josef Karma
- Ellen Kürti
- Ila Lóth
- Hermann Pfanz
- Franz Stury
- Toni Wittels

== Bibliography ==
- Narwekar, Sanjit, ed. (1994). Directory of Indian Film-Makers and Films. Trowbridge: Flicks Books. ISBN 978-0-948911-40-8.
