= Attila Nagy =

Hungarian actor

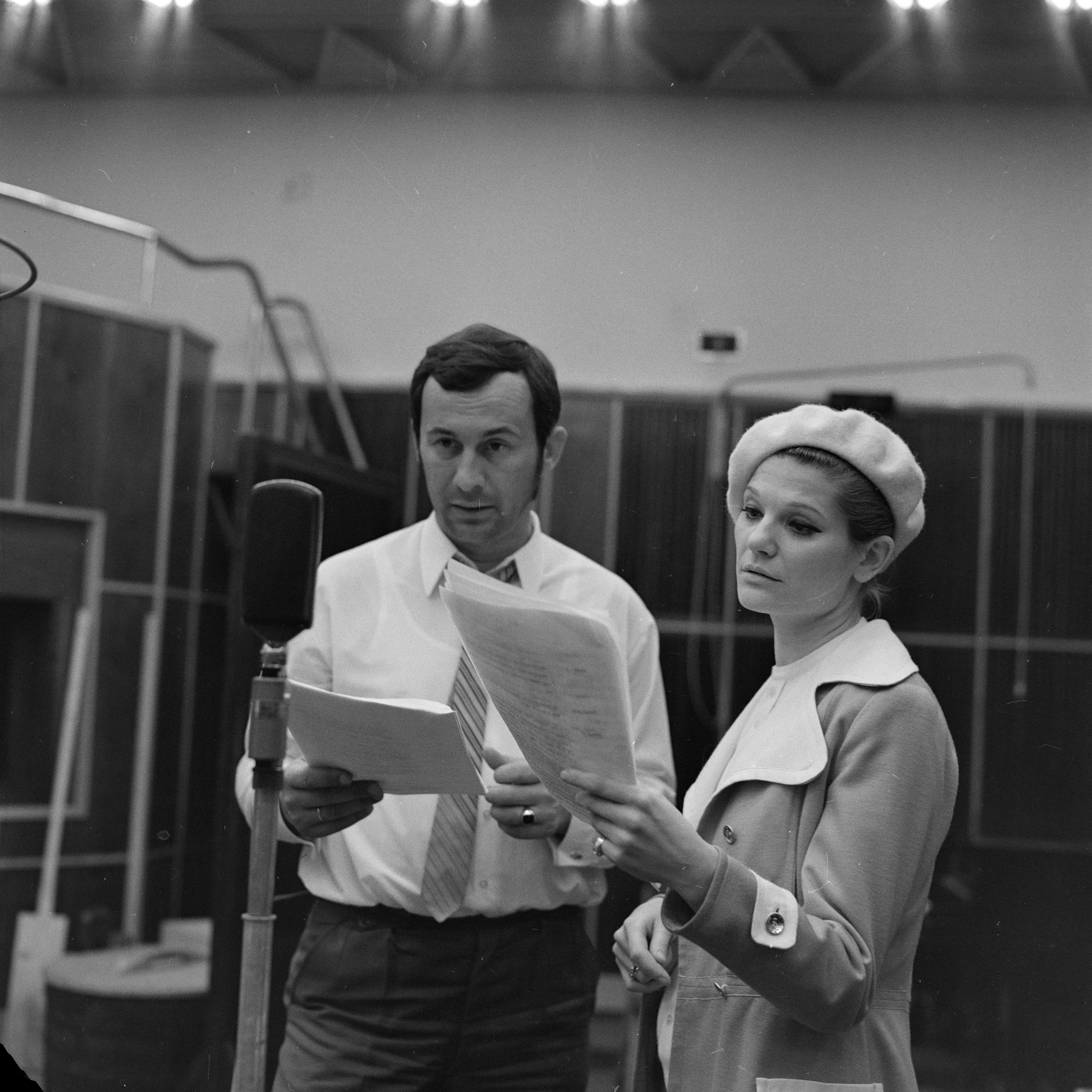
- With Emese Balogh in 1907.
- Born: 12 February 1933; Pácin, Hungary
- Died: 13 May 1992 (aged 59); Budapest, Hungary
- Occupation: Actor
- Years active: 1955–1989 (film & TV)

Attila Nagy (1933–1992) was a Hungarian stage, film and television actor. During the 1960s he played a number of lead and supporting roles in Hungarian cinema. He was married to the actress Erzsi Galambos.

== Selected filmography ==
- Love Travels by Coach (1955)
- Utolsó elötti ember (1963)
- Asszony a telepen (1963)
- A szélhámosnö (1963)
- Foto Háber (1963)
- A köszívü ember fiai (1965)
- Fény a redöny mögött (1966)
- Fügefalevél (1966)
- Édes és keserü (1967)
- The Healing Water (1967)
- Kötelék (1968)
- Kakuk Marci (1973)

== Bibliography ==
- Kósa, László. A Cultural History of Hungary: In the nineteenth and twentieth centuries. Corvina, 2000.
- Nemeskürty, István & Szántó, Tibor. A Pictorial Guide to the Hungarian Cinema, 1901-1984. Helikon, 1985.
