= Károly Lajthay =

Hungarian film director

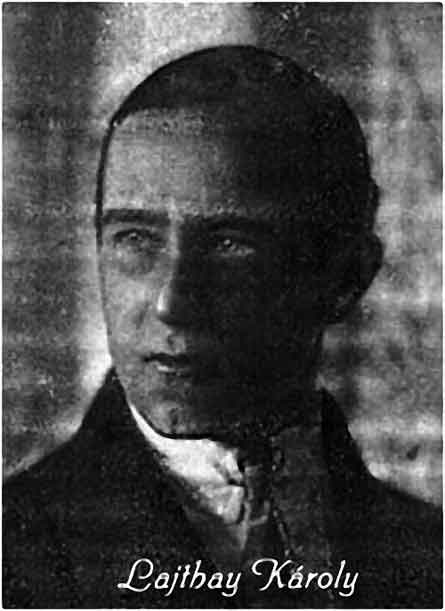
- Born: 7 December 1883; Marosvásárhely, Austria-Hungary (now Târgu Mureş, Romania)
- Died: 30 August 1946 (aged 62); Budapest, Hungary
- Other names: Lajthay le Derlé Károly; Karl Lajthay; Charles Le Derlé; Charles Lederle
- Occupations: Film director Actor
- Years active: 1916–1944

Károly Lajthay (7 December 1883 – 30 August 1946) was a Hungarian film director, actor and screenwriter. He directed 17 films between 1918 and 1944. He also appeared in 13 films between 1916 and 1920. He was born in Marosvásárhely, Austria-Hungary (now Târgu Mureş, Romania). He directed the first film version of Dracula entitled Drakula halála (1921). Lajthay died in Budapest, Hungary.

== Selected filmography ==
- A Karthausi (1916) — As actor
- A Senki fia (1917) — As actor
- Harrison and Barrison (1917) — As actor
- St. Peter's Umbrella (1917) — As actor
- Nászdal (1917) — As actor
- Drakula halála (1921) — As director, lost film
