= A Régiséggyűjtő =

1917 film

- Directed by: Alfréd Deésy
- Written by: Pál Forró
- Produced by: Star Film
- Starring: Béla Lugosi
- Release date: 1918
- Country: Hungary
- Language: Silent

A Régiséggyűjtő (translation: The Antiquarian) is a 1918 short comedy Hungarian film directed by Alfréd Deésy and featuring Béla Lugosi and Norbert Dan. The film's title could also translate as The Antique Dealer. The public premier took place at the Corso film theater in Budapest on January 28, 1918.

== Cast ==
- József Földváry (credited as Norbert Dán)
- Béla Lugosi (credited as Arisztid Olt)
- Camilla von Hollay (credited as Kamilla Hollay)
- Miklos Ujvari

== See also ==
- Béla Lugosi filmography
