= Masked Ball =

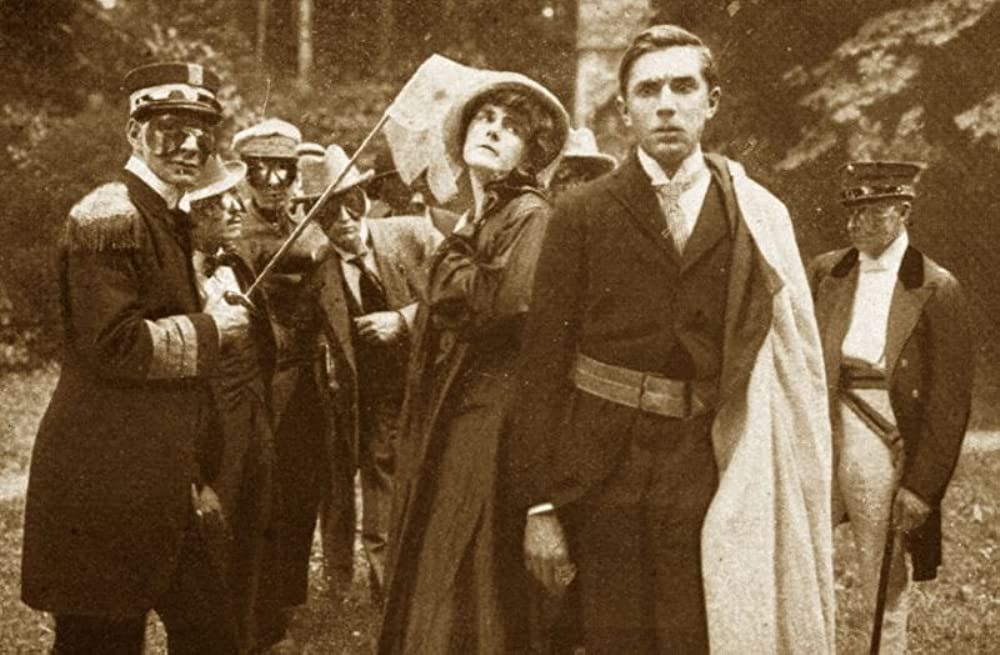
- Still from the film
- Directed by: Alfréd Deésy
- Written by: Francesco Maria Piave; Eugène Scribe; Antonio Somma
- Produced by: Star Film
- Starring: Béla Lugosi; Annie Goth; Norbert Dan; Robert Fiath
- Cinematography: Karoly Vass
- Music by: Giuseppe Verdi
- Distributed by: Star Film
- Release dates: 1917; (press premier), 1918 (public premier)
- Country: Hungary
- Language: Silent

Masked Ball (Hungarian: Álarcosbál) is a 1917 Hungarian film directed by Alfréd Deésy and featuring Béla Lugosi and Norbert Dan. The screenplay was written by Francesco Maria Piave, Eugène Scribe and Antonio Somma. It was based on the opera Un ballo in maschera by Giuseppe Verdi.

Lugosi played René, a secretary of the governor, one of his earliest "red herring" roles. The film was first shown at a press preview at the Urania Theater in Budapest on October 24, 1917. The public premier took place at the Corso film theater on March 11, 1918.

== Cast ==
- József Földváry (credited as Norbert Dán) as The Duke, governor of Mondero Island
- Béla Lugosi (credited as Arisztid Olt) as René, the secretary of The Duke
- Annie Góth as Amália, wife of René
- Róbert Fiáth as Osvalt
- Lajos Gellért (credited as Viktor Kurd) as circassian servant
- Richard Kornai as police chief

== See also ==
- Béla Lugosi filmography
