= Leoni Leo =

1917 film

- Directed by: Alfréd Deésy
- Written by: Jozsef Pakots (screenplay); George Sand (novel)
- Produced by: Richard Geiger; Tibor Rakosi
- Starring: Bela Lugosi
- Distributed by: Star Film Factory
- Release dates: August 1917 (private screening, possibly)
- Country: Hungary
- Language: Silent

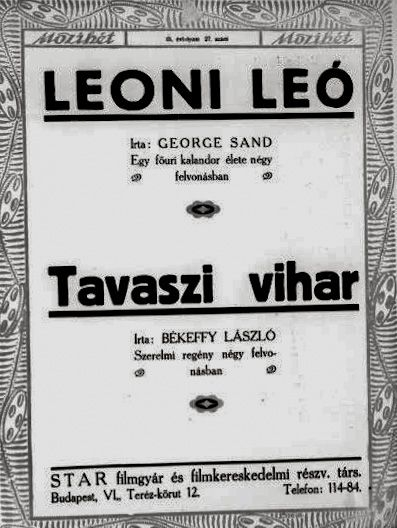

Leoni Leo (subtitled The Life of an Adventurer) is a 1917 Hungarian adventure film directed by Alfréd Deésy. Jozsef Pakots' screenplay was adapted from the original George Sand novel Leone Leoni. The sets were designed by Sironthai Istvan. The film was completed, a few promotional photographs were also distributed to the press, yet for reasons remaining unknown, it was never theatrically released. While certain unsubstantiated sources reference a "press screening" in August 1917, any such event must have been restricted to an exclusive circle. During this era, the majority of hungarian films underwent a preliminary preview for the press – typically a few months, or sometimes weeks prior to their public premiere – nevertheless, even this was denied to Leoni Leo.

== Plot ==
Lugosi plays the noble bandit Baron Leoni Leo, who leads a group of roguish gentlemen known as "the Ten". He tricks Juliette, whose father is the wealthiest jeweler in Brussels, into thinking he is in love with her, but he is really just after her for her money.

== Cast ==
- Béla Lugosi as Leoni Leo (credited as Arisztid Olt)
- Annie Góth as Juliette
- Lilla Bársony as Princess Zagarolo
- Róbert Fiáth as Marquis Lorenzo
- Lajos Gellért as Róbert (credited as Viktor Kurd)
- Marel Rolla as Carmen, a dancer
- Gusztáv Turán as Mario
- Klara Pet
- Loth Ila
- Richard Kornay

== See also ==
- Béla Lugosi filmography
