= The Wedding Song (1918 film) =

1918 Hungarian film

- Hungarian: A Naszdal
- Directed by: Alfréd Deésy
- Written by: Ignác Balla; Nándor Újhelyitar
- Produced by: Star Film
- Starring: Béla Lugosi; Károly Lajthay; Klara Peterdy; Richard Kornay
- Distributed by: Star Film
- Release dates: 6 March 1918 (Press preview); 11 April 1918 (Public premier)
- Running time: 47 minutes
- Country: Hungary
- Language: Silent

A frame from the film

The Wedding Song (Hungarian: A Nászdal) is a 1918 Hungarian film directed by Alfréd Deésy and starring Béla Lugosi. The film was first shown at a press preview at the Corso film theater in Budapest on March 6, 1918. The public premier took place at the same theater, on April 11, 1918. Lugosi's co-star in the film, Karoly Lajthay, later went on to direct the first film version of "Dracula", entitled Drakula halála (1923). (Lugosi had already emigrated to America by then.)

== Plot ==
Bela Lugosi played Paul Bertram, a celebrated violinist. While on their honeymoon, Bertram and his wife are assaulted by Izau (Károly Lajthay), a rival pianist who is in love with Bertram’s wife. Bertram kills the pianist in a duel and escapes into the forest. His wife remains behind, still believing that Bertram was killed by Izau. They are later reunited when she hears her husband playing a tune that he played to her on their wedding night.

== Cast ==
- Béla Lugosi as Paul Bertram, a famous violinist (credited as Arisztid Olt)
- Károly Lajthay as Izau (credited as Charles Lederle)
- Klara Peterdy as Sylvia
- Richard Kornay as Strom Tivadar
- Iren Barta as Bertramek Kislanya
- Karoly Hatvani as Strom Karoly
