= Alfréd Deésy =

Hungarian film director

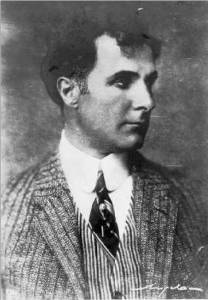
- Born: 22 September 1877; Dés, Austria-Hungary (now Dej, Romania)
- Died: 18 July 1961 (aged 83); Budapest
- Other names: Désy Alfréd; Alfred Kempf Dezsi; Alfred Kämpf
- Occupations: Film director Actor
- Years active: 1913-1960

Alfréd Deésy (22 September 1877 – 18 July 1961) was a Hungarian film director, screenwriter and actor. He directed 77 films between 1915 and 1947. Deésy also appeared as an actor in 28 films between 1913 and 1960.

== Biography ==
Deésy was born Alfréd Kämpf in Dés, Austria-Hungary (now Dej, Romania); his stage name means "from Dés," much as "Lugosi" means "from Lugos." At the turn of the twentieth century, Deésy was making his name as a prominent actor on the Hungarian stage. Deésy became interested in the potential of motion pictures early, and in 1911 became co-manager of the Apollo movie theater in Debrecen. The following year, Deésy began submitting scenarios to fledgling Hungarian film concerns, and in 1913 he made his debut as screen actor. His directorial career began with Csak semmi botrányt! (1915), produced by Star-film, a Hungarian film company over which Deésy ultimately took control and operated until 1919, when the Hungarian film industry was nationalized during the short-lived communist revolution that began that year.

After the revolution was quelled and Hungary went under military rule, Deésy joined the firm of Egyetértés as a director/writer, and soon assumed control of this movie company as well. In 1926, Deésy relocated to Vienna and made Sacco und Vanzetti (1927), an exceedingly controversial film that was banned in much of Europe, including Hungary. By 1931, Deésy was back in Hungary and in 1935 made his best known film, Nem élhetek muzsikaszó nélkül ("I Can't Live Without Music"). During the period of Hungarian collaboration within the Axis forces, Deésy continued to work as a director, making the notorious anti-Soviet film Üzenet a Volgapartról (1942) among others. After his last directorial effort, Fél pár gyűrött kesztyű (1947), Deésy continued to work as an actor right up until a few months before he died, in Budapest, at the age of 83 in 1961.

== Legacy ==
Alfréd Deésy was one of the most important figures in Hungary's silent film industry, and specialized in straightforward entertainment fare; melodramas, period pictures, adventure films, romances and, ultimately, the musical. His approach to film-making, however, was not necessarily conventional and a reflection of this aspect of his personality can be seen in the work of directors whose talents he helped foster. The Star-film unit was the main incubator of Hungarian talent in the silent period, and Bela Lugosi made his motion picture debut acting in Deésy's films, and Michael Curtiz also made some of his early films there.

As a director whose career was mostly centered in the Hungarian silent period, very little of Deésy's work is known to survive; according to the Hungarian Film Institute, all but about 15 per cent of Hungarian silent features are lost. Nem élhetek muzsikaszó nélkül, however, has long been regarded as a popular classic in Hungary, and some of his silent films—such as Á Leányasszony (1918) survive, though in most instances only in fragments, such as Casanova (1918).

== Selected filmography ==
- Rablélek (1913)
- A magyar föld ereje (1916)
- A Karthausi (1916)
- Nászdal (1917)
- A Régiséggyüjtö (1917)
- Leoni Leo (1917)
- Casanova (1918)
- Álarcosbál (1918)
- Küzdelem a létért (1918)
- Az Élet királya (1918)
- Á Leányasszony (1918)
- Éva (1919)
- Petöfi (1922)
- Sacco und Vanzetti (1927)
- I Can't Live Without Music (1935)
- You Are the Song (1940)
- A Message from the Volga Shore (1942)
- Fél pár györött kesztyö (1947)
- Dani (1957)
