= Lulu (1918 film) =

- Directed by: Michael Curtiz
- Written by: Pierre Veber
- Screenplay by: Ivan Siklosi
- Produced by: Major Ungerleider
- Starring: Klára Peterdy
- Cinematography: Joseph Vienna; Louis Gasser
- Production company: Phönix Films
- Release date: 1918
- Country: Hungary
- Languages: Silent; Hungarian intertitles

Lulu is a 1918 Hungarian silent comedy film directed by Michael Curtiz and featuring Kläry Lotto and Laszlo Z. Molnar. Some reference sources list Bela Lugosi in the cast, however, not a single contemporary newspaper mentioned his name in connection with the film, nor did his name appear in any of the reviews.

== Cast ==
- Gerő Mály
- Sándor Goth
- Laszlo Z. Molnar
- Zoltán Szeremy
- Lajos Kemenes
- Kläry Lotto as Lulu
- Hermin Haraszthy
- Rózsi Ilosvay
- Nirschy Emilia
