= Casanova (1918 film) =

1918 film

- German release poster
- Directed by: Alfréd Deésy
- Written by: Izsó Barna; László Békeffi; Jenö Faragó; József Pakots
- Produced by: Star Film
- Starring: Alfréd Deésy as Casanova
- Cinematography: Károly Vass
- Release date: 1918
- Country: Hungary
- Language: Silent

Casanova is a 1918 Hungarian film directed by Alfréd Deésy and starring Deesy in the title role. For years, this film was listed in reference books as a Bela Lugosi film, since originally Star Films advertised that Lugosi was set to play Casanova. He was replaced, however, at the last minute by the director Alfred Deesy, who decided to play the role himself. If indeed Lugosi shot any scenes for this film, they did not wind up in the finished product. The film nevertheless still turns up occasionally in Lugosi's filmography, perhaps because Lugosi had earlier appeared in Casanova – though not in the title role – on the Hungarian stage.

== Cast ==
In alphabetical order

- Péter Andorffy as Hilmer
- Viktor Costa
- Norbert Dán as Prince Roland
- Alfréd Deésy as Casanova
- László Faludi as Paul
- Tessza Fodor
- Annie Góth as Princess Felsenburg
- Sandy Igolits as Clara
- Richard Kornai as Minister of Foreign Affairs
- Ila Lóth as Ninette
- Gyula Margittai as Count Waldenstein
- Marel Rolla
- Sári Sólyom as Derusse
- Margaretta Tímár as Margaretta Hilmer
- Gusztáv Turán
- Miklós Ujvári as the Father
- Camilla von Hollay as Margit (as Hollay Kamilla)
- Lucy Wett as Suzanne Hilmer
- Bela Lugosi (was edited out of the film and does not appear)
