= Lili (1917 film) =

1917 film

- Directed by: Cornelius Hintner
- Written by: Jenő Faragó
- Based on: Lili; 1882 play by Alfred Hennequin; Albert Millaud
- Produced by: Richárd Geiger; Tibor Rákosi
- Starring: Klára Peterdy; Richard Kornay
- Cinematography: Károly Vass
- Production company: Star
- Release date: 24 October 1917; (press preview)
- Country: Hungary
- Language: Silent

Lili (Hungarian: Egy Nagymama naplójából) is a 1917 Hungarian comedy film directed by Cornelius Hintner. The film was first shown at a press preview on October 24, 1917 at the Urania Theater in Budapest. The public premier took place at the Corso film theater on January 7, 1918. Some sources list Bela Lugosi in the cast, but that is unverified.

== Cast ==
In alphabetical order

- Ida Andorffy as Lili as a young woman
- Klára Peterdy as Lili as an older woman
- Sándor Góth
- Richard Kornay as Br. de la Grange
- Ila Lóth as Antoinin
- Cläre Lotto
- Charles Puffy (credited as Károly Huszár)
- Zoltán Szerémy
- Gusztáv Turán as René
- Károly Ujvári as Saint Hypothese
- Gusztáv Vándory

== Production ==
The film is a comedy in four acts based on Hervé's operetta of the same name.

As late as September 1917, promotional material for the film claimed that Arisztid Olt (later known as Bela Lugosi) played Plinchard at both the younger and elder stage of his life. Advertisements and reviews of Lili's preview at the Uránia in Budapest in October 1917 have Gusztáv Vándory in the role of Plinchard/Tábornok. a 1918 issue of the Mozihét Kino-Woche published a series of pictures showing Vándory as Plinchard. Lugosi is not seen in any of the images. Gary Rhodes, a Lugosi biographer stated in 2020 that "there is no compelling evidence that Lugosi appeared in Lili."

== Release and reception ==
Lili was screened for two weeks at Budapest's Corso Theater, an unprecedented amount of time.
