= Charlotte Sannom =

Danish painter, writer, and missionary (1846–1923)

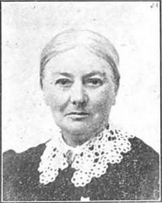
- Born: Charlotte Amalie Sannom; 28 September 1846; Nykøbing Mors, Denmark
- Died: 18 December 1923 (aged 77); Nødebo, Denmark
- Other names: Niels Brock
- Occupations: Painter; writer; missionary
- Years active: 18??–1907
- Parents: Fritz Sannom (father); Albertine Charlotte von Rummelhoff (mother)

Charlotte Amalie Sannom (28 September 1846 – 18 December 1923) was a Danish painter, writer, and missionary. Her paintings typically involved landscapes in a realism style. She also wrote two books before withdrawing from public life in 1907 due to rheumatoid arthritis.

== Biography ==
Sannom was born in Nykøbing Mors, Denmark. She was the oldest child from her parents' marriage with two younger brothers. She also had an older, half-sister from her father's first marriage. She studied at Vilhelm Kyhn's Painting School for Women.

Sannom began volunteering at Church Association for the Inner Mission in Denmark in 1876. She later became the first female missionary for the Inner Mission in 1890, and began receiving pay in 1896. Due to her increase in work with Inner Mission, as well as writing two novels, her time spent painting was cut short. She also worked with Det Hvide Baand (lit. 'The White Ribbon') upon its creation in 1888, becoming secretary and vice president. In 1889, Sannom replaced Elisabeth Selmer to become chairman until 1900. During this time, she was also a member of the Danish Women's Society.

In 1887, under the pseudonym of Niels Brock, Sannom wrote a book advocating for abstinence. She later wrote a second book Ingen Oprejsning which was a novel based on her own involvement with the anti-prostitution movement published under her own name. In addition to her own writing, she also worked as translator for English author Dinah Craik's A Woman's Thoughts about Women. She was also involved with the temperance movement, submitting a proposal to the Cabinet of Denmark and Sweden's Riksdag to restrict the sale of alcohol.

In 1907, Sannom was diagnosed with rheumatoid arthritis, which became a major part of her later life.

== Personal life ==
Sannom's niece, Emilie Sannom, was a silent film actress and aerial acrobat.

== Bibliography ==
- En knudret Vej (1887, written under pseudonym Niels Brock)
- Ingen Oprejsning (1903)

== Exhibitions ==
- 1880, 1884, 1886–1889 – Charlottenborg Spring Exhibition, Copenhagen, Denmark
- 1895 – 1895 Copenhagen Women's Exhibition, Copenhagen, Denmark

== Gallery ==
Paintings by Charlotte Sannom

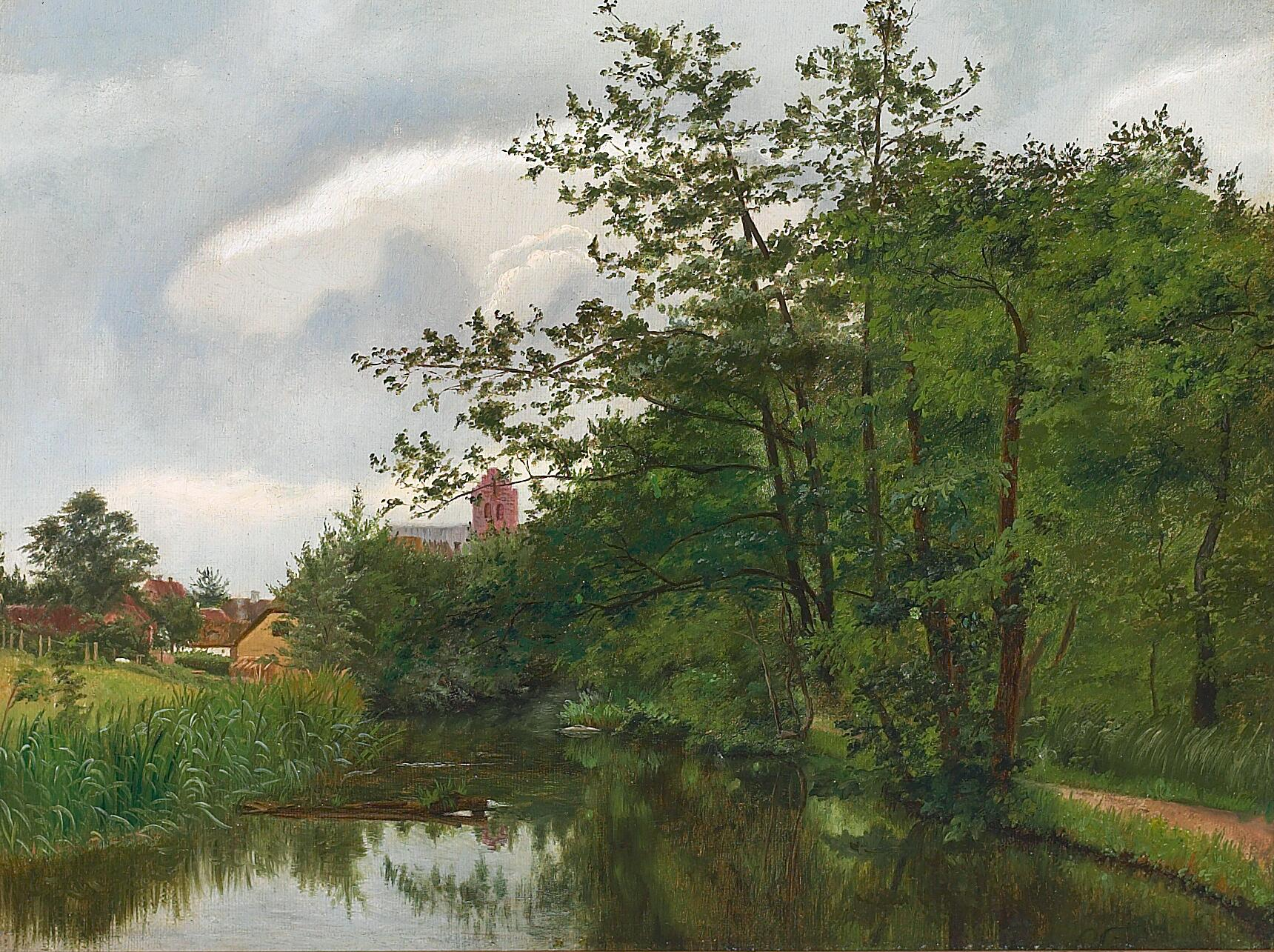
Parti fra Sorgenfri med Mølleåen, i baggrunden Lyngby kirke, oil on canvas, 1879

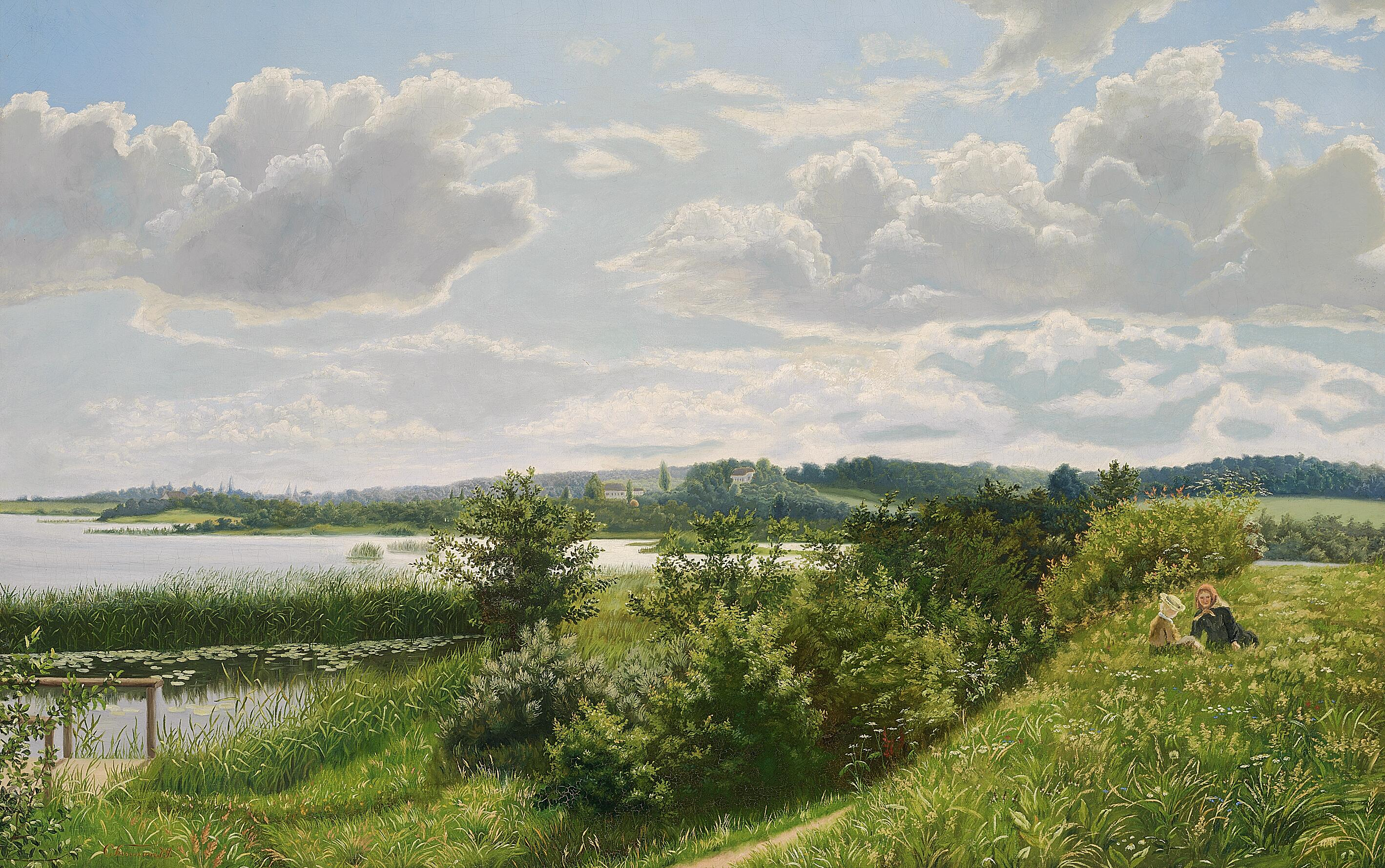
Parti ved Lyngby Sø med Frederiksdal Skov i Baggrunden. Eftermiddag., oil on canvas, 1879

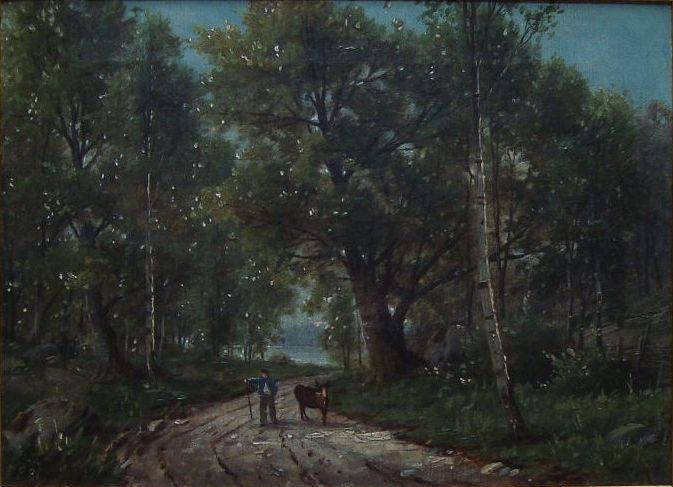
Vej gennem skov med personer, oil on canvas, 1881

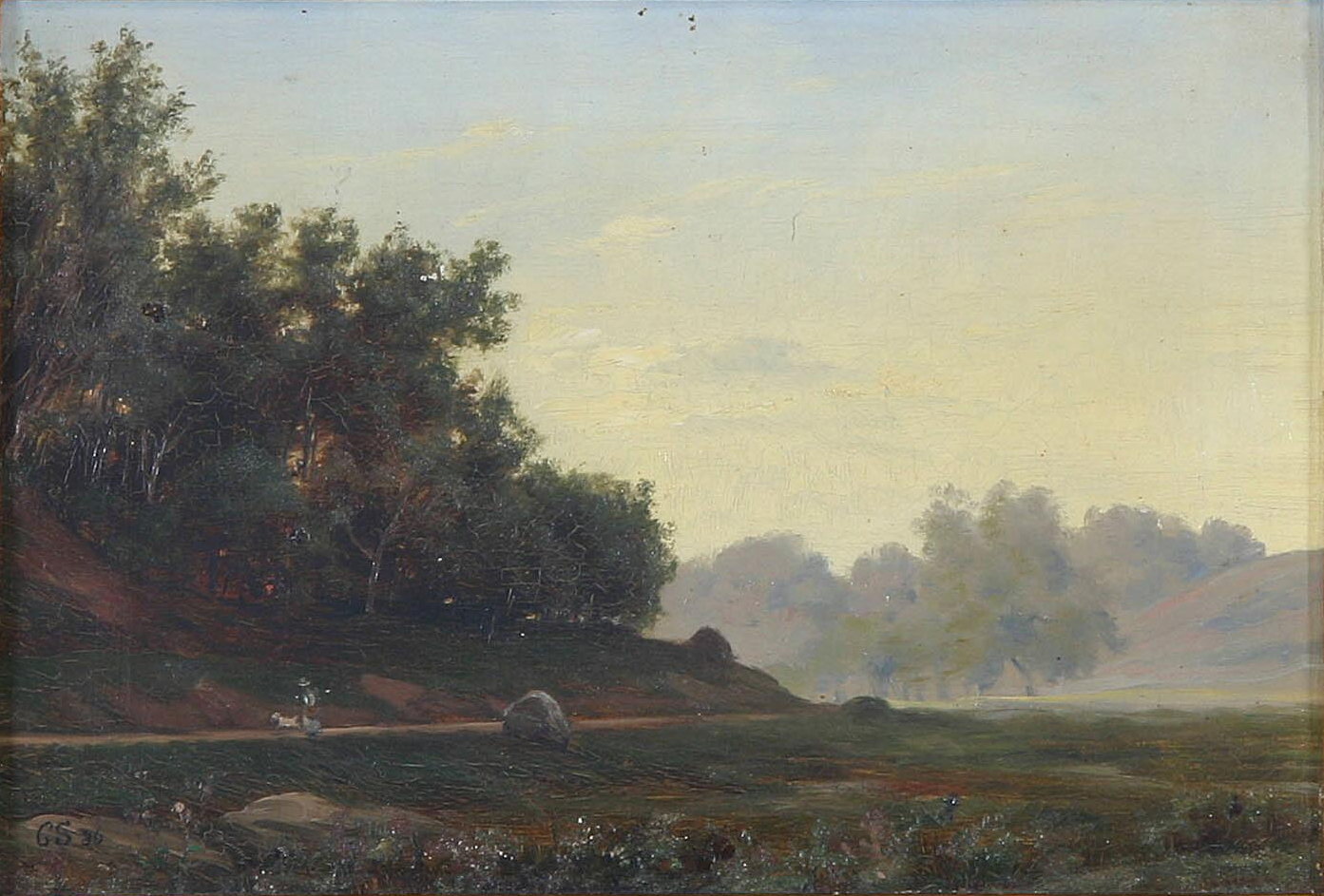
Parti fra Ordrup Mølle, oil on canvas, 1886

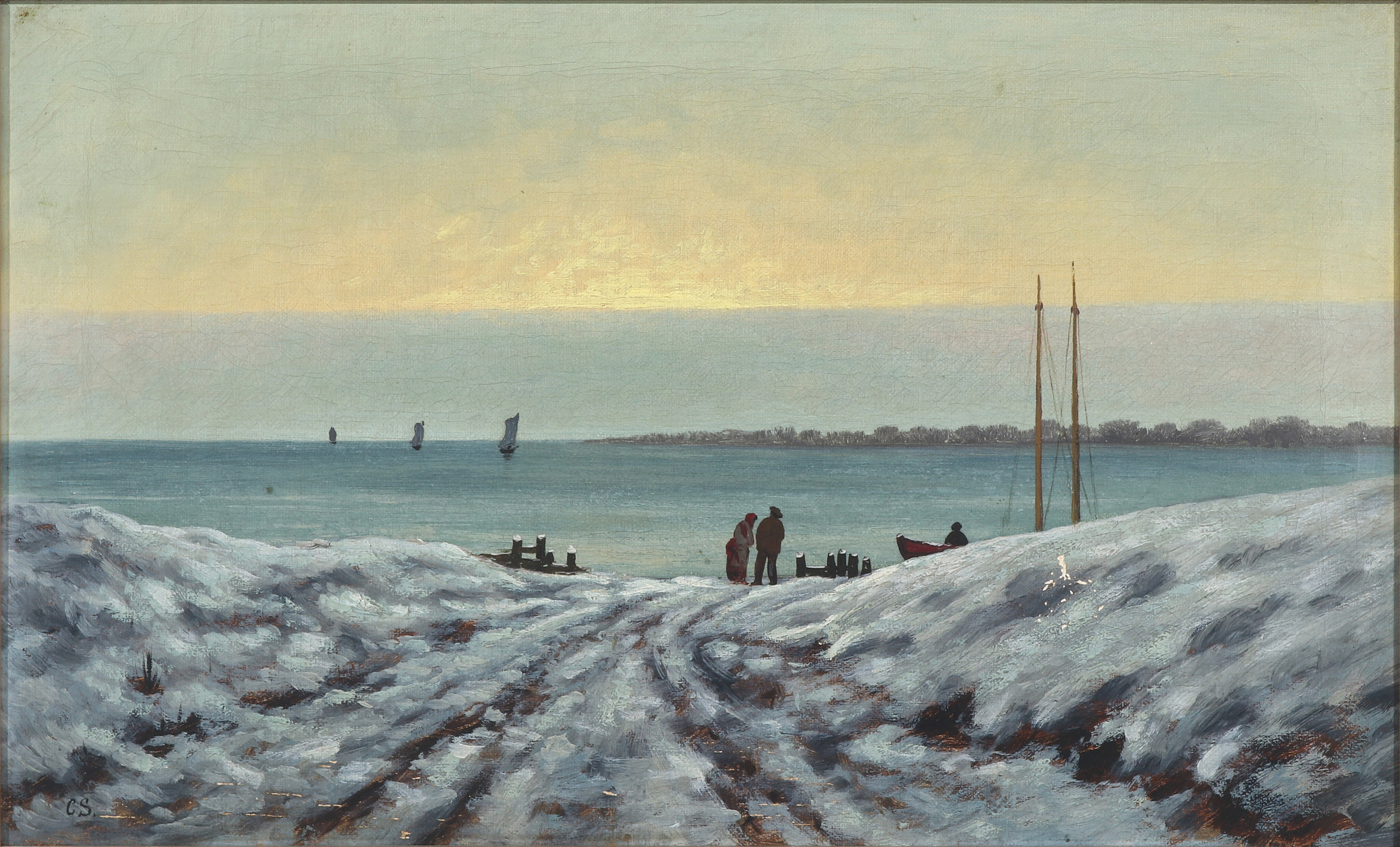
Kystparti med personer, vinter, oil on canvas

== See also ==
- List of Danish painters

== Sources ==
- Larsen, Jytte (2000). Vannem, Tinne (ed.). Dansk kvindebiografisk leksikon [Danish Women's Biographical Encyclopedia] (in Danish). Vol. 1–4. Rosinante.
- "Fortegnelse over kvindernes udstilling fra fortid og nutid 1895: Andet oplag" [Index of the Women's Exhibition Past and Present 1895: Second Edition] (PDF) (in Danish). Nielsen & Lydiche. 1895.
- Brock, Niels (1887). En knudret Vej (in Danish). Otto Wroblewski.
- Thorndal, Palle (2 December 2013). Asnæs-sagaen (in Danish). BoD – Books on Demand. ISBN 9788771455045.
- Grisbø, Erland; Grisbø, Erik (1954). Jul i Nordsjælland [Christmas in North Zealand] (PDF) (in Danish). Hillerød: C. Nordlundes Bogtrykkeri.
- Dahlerup, Pil (30 January 2024). Det moderne gennembruds kvinder (in Danish). Lindhardt og Ringhof. ISBN 9788727129976.
- Christensen, Hilda Rømer (1995). Mellem backfische og pæne piger (in Danish). Museum Tusculanum. ISBN 9788772892863.
- Thomsen, Ulla (27 January 2016). Familie-Tidende: A Portrayal of Danish Women's Rights in 1871. University of California, Berkeley.
- Figgé, V (1928). Blade af Samarbejdets Historie (in Danish). V. Figgé.
