= Lock Up Your Daughters (1959 film) =

1959 film by Phil Rosen

Lock Up Your Daughters is a 1959 British horror film starring Bela Lugosi as narrator. The film was produced by E.J. Fancey, using archival footage from 1940s horror films (mostly from Monogram Pictures starring Lugosi); and reportedly ran 50 minutes. Phil Rosen is credited as the film’s director. It was made in England which was the only country in which the film was ever shown. It appears to be a lost film today, sought by the BFI.

Alongside the Kinematograph Weekly review, the film was advertised in the Liverpool Echo as playing on a double bill with The Neanderthal Man. To date, no prints or press materials on the film have surfaced.

In 1950, Lugosi starred on a one-hour TV program called "Murder and Bela Lugosi" for WPIX-TV in which he was interviewed and provided commentary about a number of his old Monogram horror films, while clips from the films were shown. Historian Gary Rhodes thinks some of this "Lugosi as host" footage found its way into the 1959 British film called "Lock Up Your Daughters".

== Plot ==
Details on the film’s plot are sketchy. A 1959 review of the film that appeared in the British trade journal Kinematography Weekly claimed that Lugosi played a "vampiric doctor who experiments on young women in order to bring back to life his lovely wife." The review states the film incorporates clips from films made earlier in Lugosi’s career, with footage featuring the Bowery Boys and "some of the great favourites of yesteryear."

Other reviews of the film claim that Lugosi served as an on-screen host narrating a series of excerpts from his older films, while there are also assertions that Lock Up Your Daughters offered cash prizes for audience members who could identify the original films referenced in this production.

== See also ==
- Bela Lugosi filmography
