= Küzdelem a létért =

1918 film

- Directed by: Alfréd Deésy
- Based on: La lutte pour la vie by Alphonse Daudet
- Production company: Star Film
- Release date: 23 September 1918
- Country: Hungary

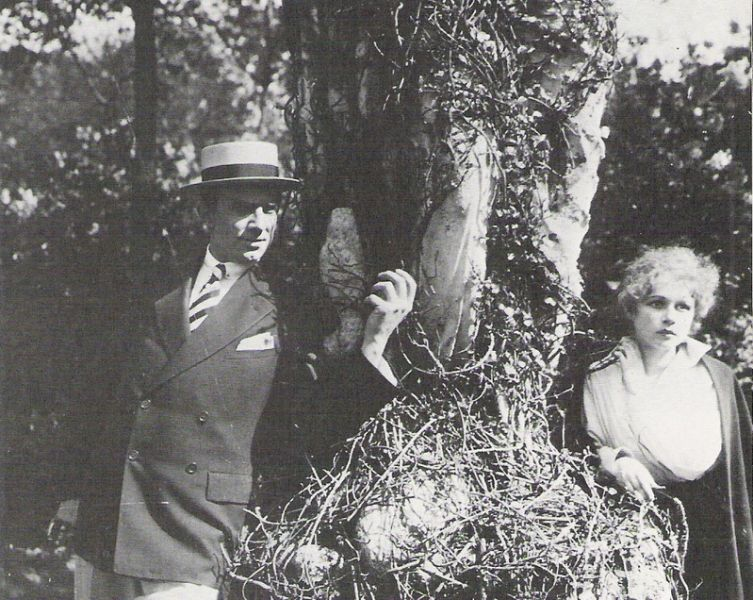
Küzdelem a Létért

Küzdelem a létért (transl. The Struggle for Life) is a 1918 Hungarian drama film directed by Alfréd Deésy. It is based on French writer Alphonse Daudet's 1889 play La lutte pour la vie. The film was advertised and discussed in Hungarian trade publications as A Leopard (transl. The Leopard).

== Cast ==
Cast adapted from book Lugosi.

- Annie Góth as princess Viktoria
- Béla Lugosi (credited as Arisztid Olt) as Orlay Pál
- Klára Peterdy as baroness Matild
- Gusztáv Turán as count Alfréd
- Ila Lóth as Betty, the postwoman
- Péter Konrády as János, the butler

== Production ==
Bela Lugosi was billed as Arisztid Olt in the film and it was his final film for Star Studios. Only a two minute fragment of the film is available.

== Release ==
Küzdelem a létért was previewed on July 16, 1918 at the Mozgókép-Otthon in Budapest, before being released in the Corso film theater on September 23, 1918.
