= Emilie Sannom =

Danish actress (1886–1931)

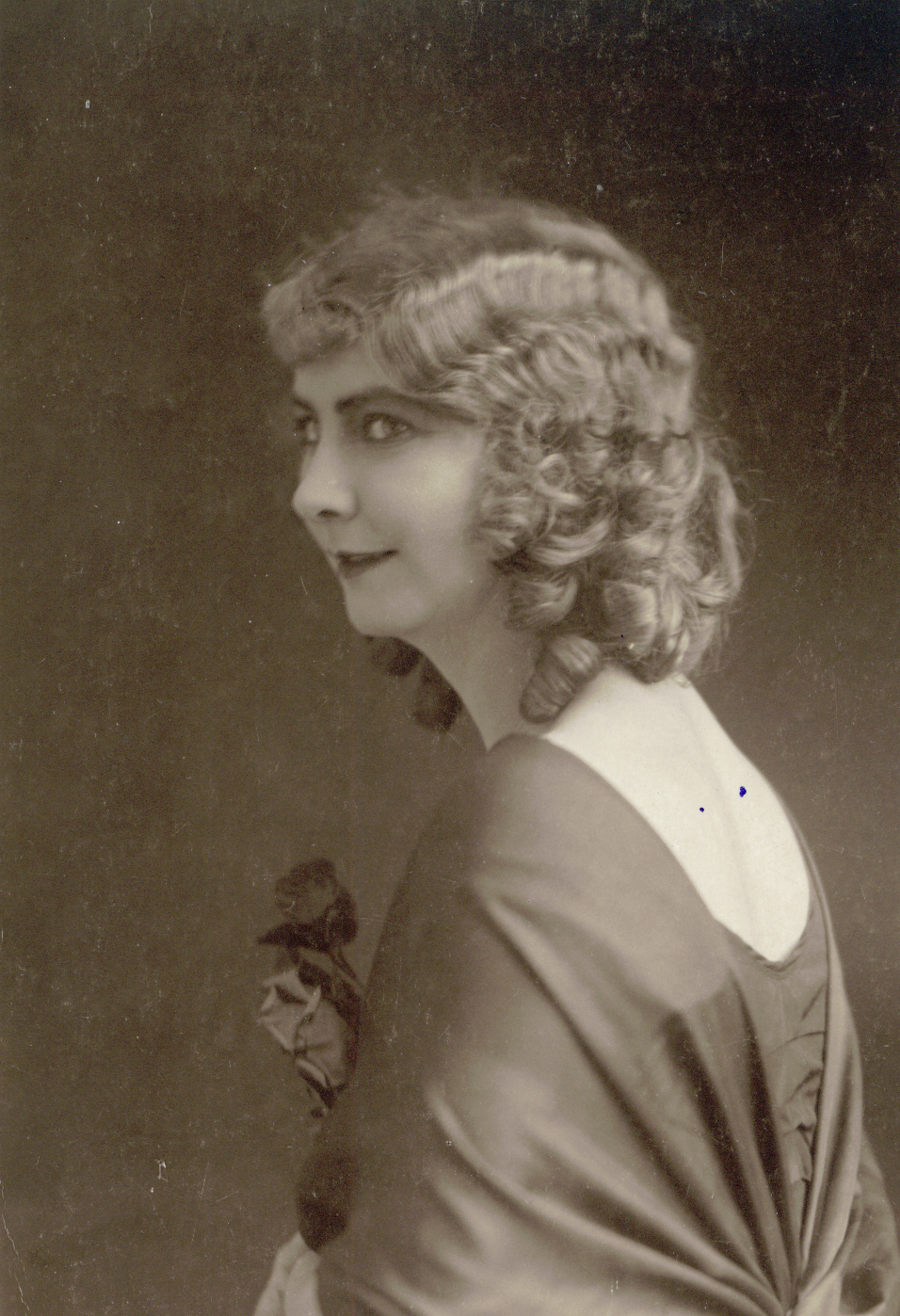
- Sannom circa 1915
- Born: Emilie Kirstine Valborg Sannom; 29 September 1886; Nørrebro, Denmark
- Died: 30 August 1931 (aged 44); Grenaa, Denmark
- Occupations: Actress, stuntwoman
- Years active: 1909 — 1931
- Children: 1
- Parent(s): Fritz Emil Sophus Sannom, Johanne Kamilla Hansen

Emilie Kirstine Valborg Sannom (29 September 1886 – 30 August 1931) was a Danish silent film actress and aerial acrobat. Throwing herself into the castle moat in Nordisk Film's Hamlet (1911), she became the first stunt woman in Danish cinema. She went on to play dangerous roles in numerous films, sometimes as the leading actress. Sannon retired from the cinema in 1923 but continued to perform on the stage, in circuses or making risky parachute jumps. In 1931, at an air show in Grenaa, some 8,000 spectators saw her fall to her death when her parachute failed to open.

== Biography ==
Born on 29 September 1886 in Nørrebro, near Copenhagen, Emilie Kirstine Valborg Sannom was the daughter of the seaman Fritz Emil Sophus Sannom (1854–1935) and Johanne Kamilla Hansen (1861–1936). When she was 11 months old, the family moved to Florida. They had hoped to become rich there but returned to Denmark seven years later after unsuccessfully running an orange plantation. She and her sisters Charlotte (1884–1954), Thora (1893–1954) and Ragnhild (1896–1953) all became actresses, apparently from an early age.

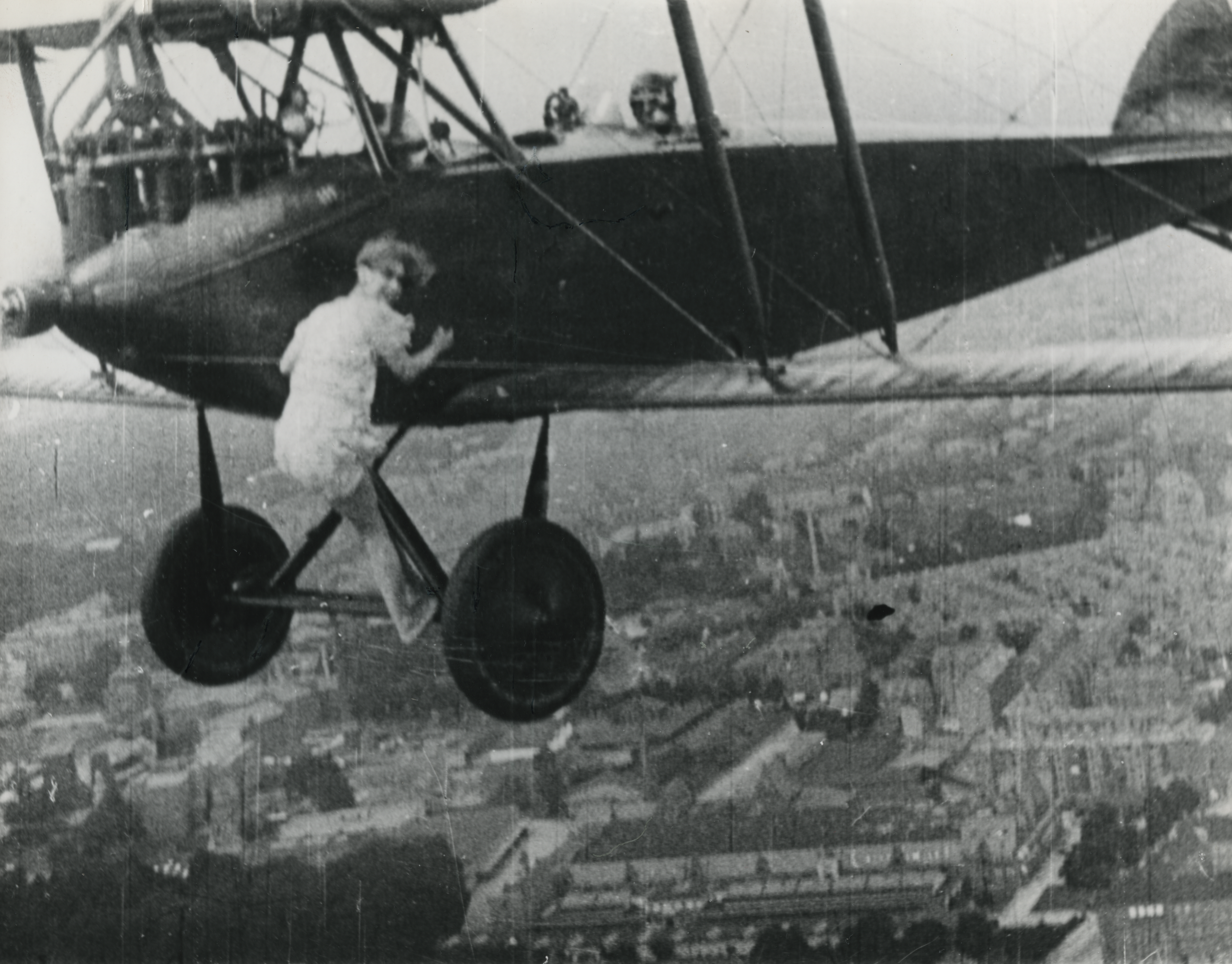
Sannom in a stunt episode (c. 1925)

After appearing on stage and perhaps taking minor parts in earlier films, in 1909 she performed in Biorama's Gøngehøvdingen (The Partisan Chieftain). The following year, she played a supporting role alongside Asta Nielsen in Kosmorama's The Abyss, and in 1911, she appeared with Nielsen in Nordisk's Balletdanserinden (The Ballet Dancer). It was in Nordisk's production of Hamlet that she played Ophelia. She threw herself down into the castle moat, becoming Denmark's first film actress to perform as a stunt woman.

All in all, she appeared in some 85 films until she retired from the screen in 1922. Her last film was the Italian La fanciulla dell'aria (Mistress of the Sky) directed by Alfred Lind, in which, wearing only a swimsuit, she performed daredevil stunts on a flying plane.

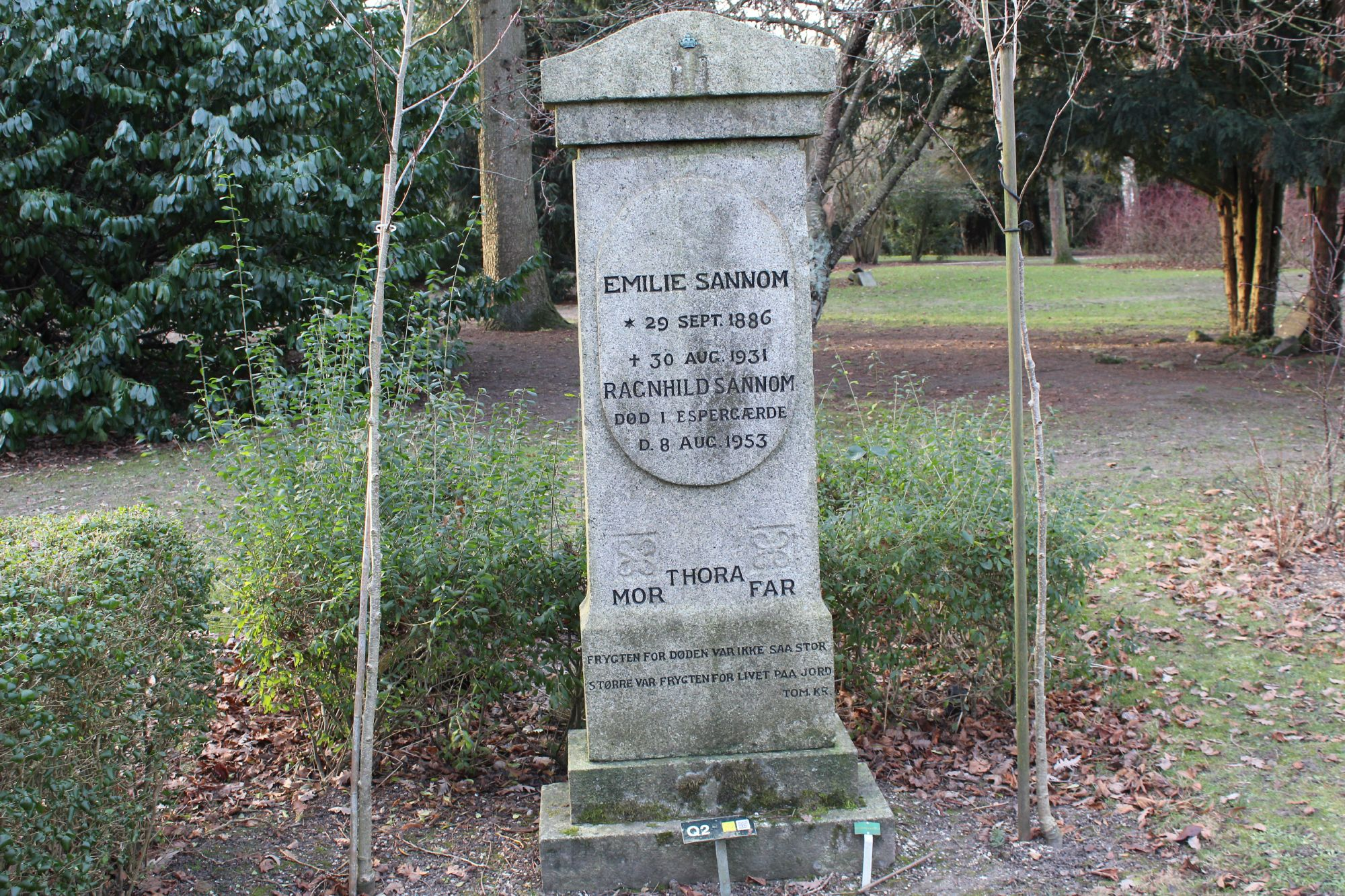
Emilie Sannom's tomb at Assistens Cemetery in Copenhagen.

Sannom was passionately fond of flying. She started taking lessons in 1918 but never qualified as a pilot. She appeared in shows around Denmark, performing aerial acrobatics. One of her stunts was to throw herself from a plane opening her parachute at the last minute. In one such show in Grenaa on 30 August 1931, the parachute failed to open and she fell to her death. She is buried in Copenhagen's Assistens Cemetery. She was survived by her daughter Grete, born 14 April 1912.

== Personal life ==
Sannom's aunt, Charlotte Sannom, was a painter, writer, and missionary.
