= Az élet királya =

1918 film

- Directed by: Alfréd Deésy
- Screenplay by: József Pakots
- Based on: The Picture of Dorian Gray; 1891 novel by Oscar Wilde
- Produced by: Richárd Geiger; Tibor Rákosi
- Starring: Norbert Dán; Bela Lugosi
- Cinematography: Károly Vass
- Production company: Star
- Release dates: 23 October 1917 (Budapest, press preview); 19 January 1918 (Budapest, public premier)
- Country: Hungary

Az élet királya (transl. The Royal Life) is a 1917 Hungarian film directed by Alfréd Deésy. It is an adaptation of The Picture of Dorian Gray by Oscar Wilde.

The film was first shown at a press preview at the Urania Theater in Budapest on October 23, 1917. The public premier took place at the Corso film theater on January 19, 1918 and was described as an "almost unprecedented success" in local Budapest press. It received a positive review in Pesti Napló.

== Cast ==
Cast adapted from the books Lugosi : His Life in Films, on Stage, and in the Hearts of Horror Lovers and Becoming Dracula: Volume 1.

- József Földváry (credited as Norbert Dán) as Dorian Gray
- Bela Lugosi (credited as Arisztid Olt) as Lord Harry Watton
- Annie Goth as the Duchess of Marlborough
- Ila Loth as Sibyl Vane, színésznő (the actress)
- Kamilla Hollay as Hetti
- Gusztav Turan as Basil Hallward, festőművész (the painter)
- Richard Kornai as A herceg (the prince)
- Viktor Kurd

== Production ==
Az élet királya was based on Oscar Wilde's novel The Picture of Dorian Gray (1891). In the film, Norbert Dán plays Dorian Gray while Bela Lugosi portrayed Lord Harry Watton, known in the novel as Lord Henry Wotton.

== Release ==
Az élet királya was previewed at the Uránia in Budapest on October 23, 1917. It was officially released on January 19, 1918, at Budapest's Corso Theater. The film was described as an "almost unprecedented success" in local Budapest press.

In some ads, the film was referred to as simple Élet királya. The film was released in Germany as Die Spur seiner Sünden. Outside of Hungary it was also known as Dorian Gray Arckepe. As of 2022, as with nearly all of Lugosi's Hungarian film productions, no copy of the film is known to exist.

== Reception ==
In the Hungarian newspaper Pesti Napló, a critic declared the film "a great psychological drama" and declared it an interesting comparison with the German film Das Bildnis des Dorian Gray by Richard Oswald. Other reviews praised the work of Bela Lugosi, who performed in the film under the name Arisztid Olt. A critic in Mozihét Kino-Woche stated Lugosi played Lord Watton "with an artfulness of the highest quality" while another called his acting "most noble."

== See also ==
- Bela Lugosi filmography
- Adaptations of The Picture of Dorian Gray
