= Ludwig Erb =

Film producer

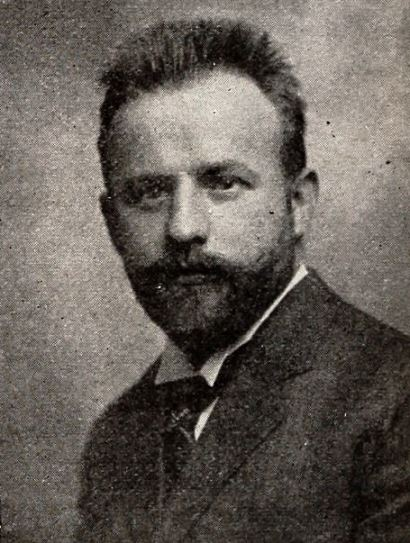

Ludwig G. B. Erb (November 3, 1875 – July 31, 1958) was a film producer in the United States during the silent film era. He established Erbograph Productions.

== Career ==
Erb was involved in a series of film businesses. He worked with Pat Powers and Joseph A. Golden at one studio. He established Crystal Film Company/ Crystal Productions, a split-reel comedy film producer that supplied Universal and then United Film Service. It partnered with other producers after United folded. Golden partnered with Erb at Crystal.

According to IMDb, O. E. Goebel served as president of Erbograph Productions. He went on to write and direct films.

In the early 20th century, Erb registered names for various health products with the U.S. Patent Office. Erb also invested in residential property development in Beverly Hills in the 1920s./

== Filmography ==
- The Crimson Stain Mystery (1916), producer
- Infidelity (1917 film), produced by Ludwig G. B. Erb's Erbograph Company
- The Little Samaritan (1917), produced by Ludwig G.B. Erb
- Little Miss Fortune (1917), producer
- The Road Between (1917), producer
- Drusilla with a Million (1925), supervisor
