= Sin Town =

Sin Town may refer to:

- Sin Town (1929 film), a silent American film
- Sin Town (1942 film), an American film
