= Huns Within Our Gates =

- Written by: Madame Marie Genores (titles); Jesse J. Goldburg (titles)
- Starring: Derwent Hall Caine; Valda Valkyrien
- Cinematography: John K. Holbrook
- Edited by: Madame Marie Genores; Jesse J. Goldburg
- Distributed by: Arrow Film Corporation
- Release date: 1918
- Country: United States
- Languages: Silent film English intertitles

Huns Within Our Gates is a 1918 American silent World War I propaganda film, starring Derwent Hall Caine and Valda Valkyrien. Released by the Arrow Film Corporation, the cast, characters and plot were used in The Crusher (1917). While credits for who produced the film are lacking, the film was edited and titled by Madame Marie Genores and Jesse J. Goldburg at the Thanhouser Studio in New Rochelle, NY.

After being re-edited the film was re-released as Commercial Pirates in March 1919. Also known as The Hearts of Men.

== Plot ==
Arthur Morgan, son of an old Southern family is engaged in perfecting an aeroplane engine designed to revolutionize the air science. He is handicapped by the impoverishment of his family. Their wealth was buried during the Civil War, and has never been discovered. The Prussian agents seek to trade upon his poverty to buy his invention, but he refuses to sell, and an effort to bomb the inventor and his plane is frustrated by the action of a pet dog, which carries the bomb away from the workshop and drops it, killing the spy, and disclosing the long buried treasure.

== Cast ==
- Derwent Hall Caine as Arthur Morgan
- Valda Valkyrien as Dorothy Waring
- Harry Robinson as Judge Morgan
- Robin Townley as Eli Brown
- Bessie Wharton as Countess Von Shoenburg

== Preservation ==
Huns Within Our Gates is currently presumed lost. In February 2021, the film was cited by the National Film Preservation Board on their Lost U.S. Silent Feature Films list.
