= Wild Beauty =

Wild Beauty may refer to:

- Wild Beauty (1927 film), an American silent Western film
- Wild Beauty (1946 film), an American action film
