= The Man Worth While =

1921 film directed by Romaine Fielding

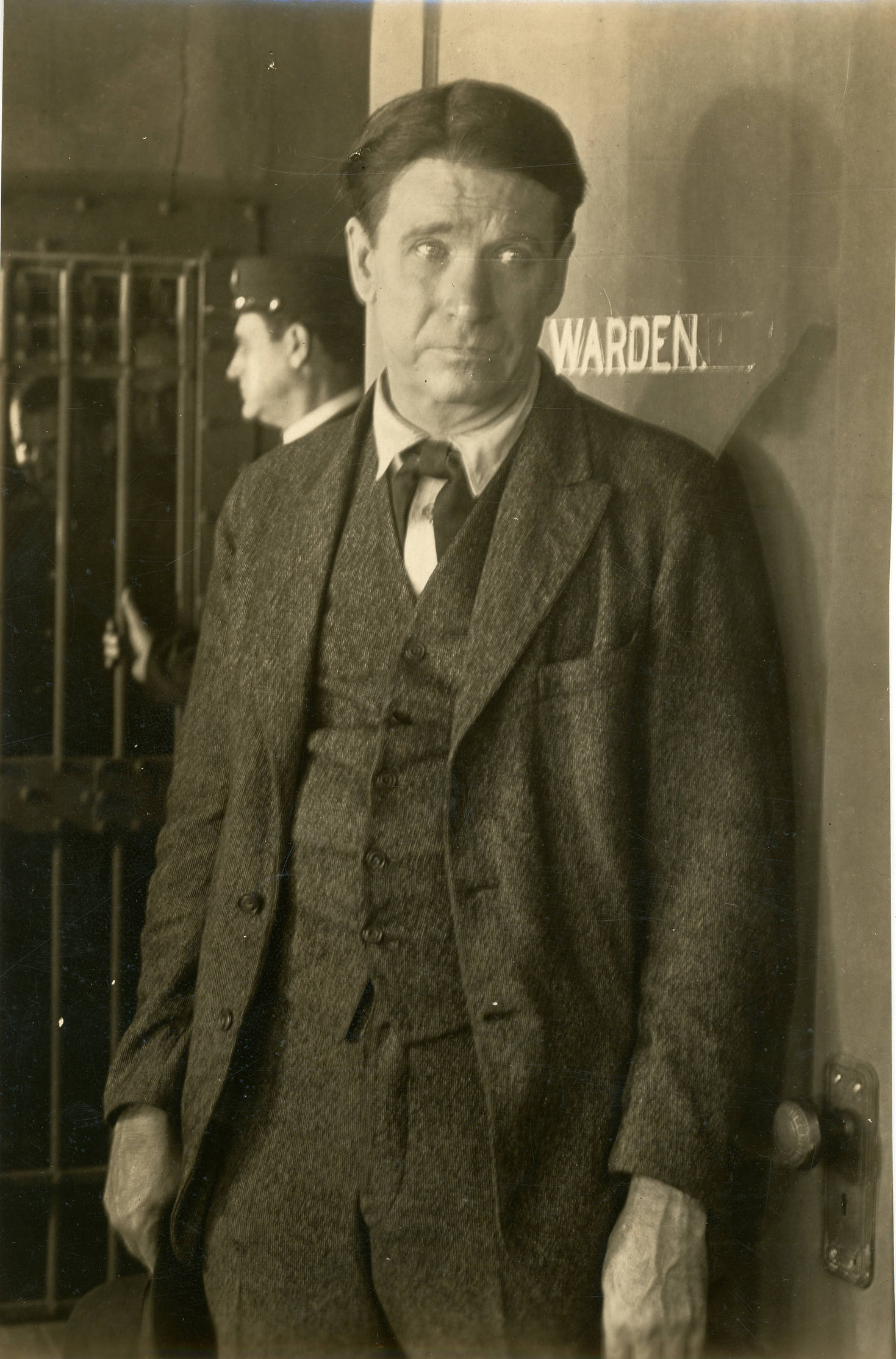
- Fielding in the film
- Directed by: Romaine Fielding
- Based on: The poem, "The Man Worth While" by Ella Wheeler Wilcox
- Starring: Joan Arliss; Lawrence Johnson; Eugene Acker
- Production company: Romaine Fielding Productions
- Release date: September 9, 1921 (US)
- Running time: 5 reels
- Country: United States
- Language: Silent (English intertitles)

The Man Worth While is a 1921 American silent melodrama film, directed by Romaine Fielding. It stars Joan Arliss, Lawrence Johnson, and Eugene Acker, and was released on September 9, 1921.

== Cast list ==
- Joan Arliss as Mary Alden
- Lawrence Johnson as the child
- Eugene Acker as Herbert Loring
- Margaret Seddon as Mrs. Ward
- Frederick Eckhart as André
- Peggy Parr as Cecile
- Herbert Standing as Mrs. Forbes-Grey
- Vanda Tierendelli as Miss Flo
- Barney Gilmore as the judge
- Natalie O'Brien as the dancer
- Tex Cooper as the parson
- Kid Broad as a Lifer
- Emile Le Croix as the doctor
- Frank De Vernon as Eddie Loring
- Burt Hodkins as Percy
- Clarence Heritage as the sheriff
- Ruth Buchanan as the operator
- Tammany Young as Useless
- Billy Quirk as Napoleon
- Romaine Fielding as Don Ward
