= Heimat (play) =

1893 play by Hermann Sudermann

Heimat (Home) is an 1893 play by the German dramatist Hermann Sudermann. The play, either in the original German or in translations, was commonly also known as Magda, the name of the heroine. It was thought by some to be the most widely known and the most successful drama of the end of the 19th century.

== Analysis ==
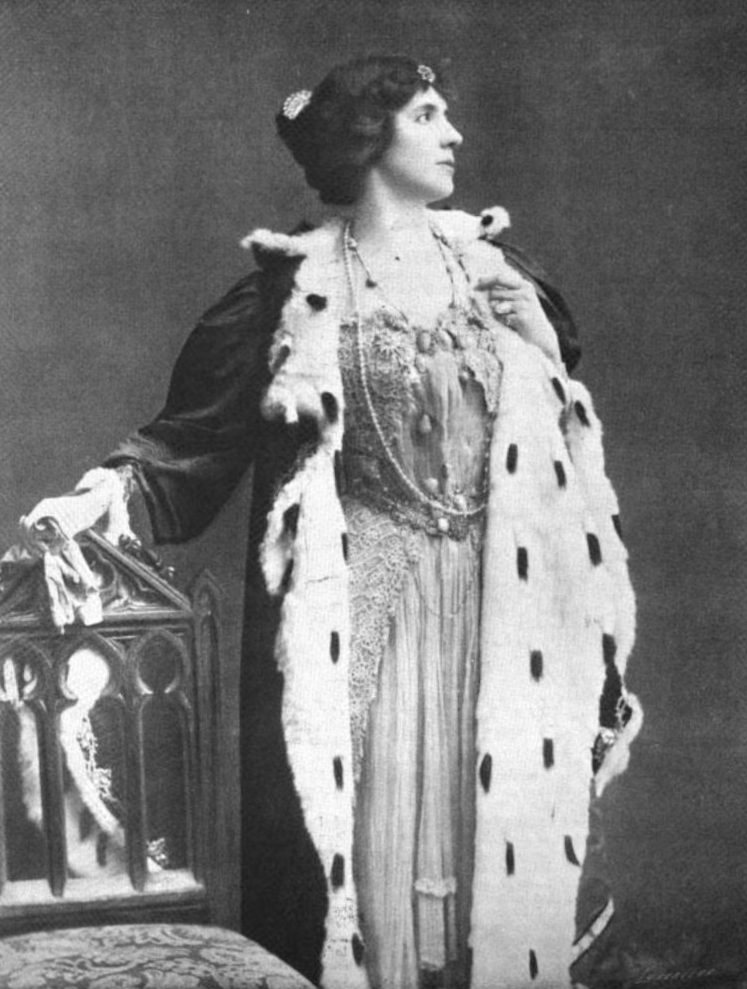
Mrs. Patrick Campbell as Magda in 1900

Its success in the 19th century is traceable to at least four causes:

1. its theme of revolt against paternal tyranny is one to which the times were sympathetic
2. its construction is skillful and in every sense theatrical
3. it contains a number of picturesque episodes and amusing characters, and is distinguished for animated dialogue
4. its heroine is an unconventional, self-assertive, and emotional "New Woman" who affords an actress an unusual opportunity for temperamental display

The technique is a clever combination of the naturalism of Ibsen and the methods of the drame à thèse familiar in the works of Dumas fils. The conventional raisonneur — in the person of the Pastor Heffterdingk — mediates between Magda and her father, and debates with each the problems presented by the situation of a prodigal daughter who returns home after a life of moral irregularity but operatic success.

The play bids the audience to despise respectability and admire independence. But the representative of each side is far from being an acceptable champion. Magda's father fails to recognize the difference between a child with duties and a human being with rights, and Magda reveals no conception of the fact that duty is only in part a social obligation and is in its innermost essence an obligation of self-respect.

== Adaptation ==
In 1917, the play was adapted into the American silent film Magda, directed by Emile Chautard.

In 1938, it was adapted into a film Heimat directed by Carl Froelich.

== Editions ==
It has been translated into English by C. E. A. Winslow (Boston 1896), and edited by F. G. G. Schmidt (Boston 1909).
