= Shore Acres (1914 film) =

1914 silent film

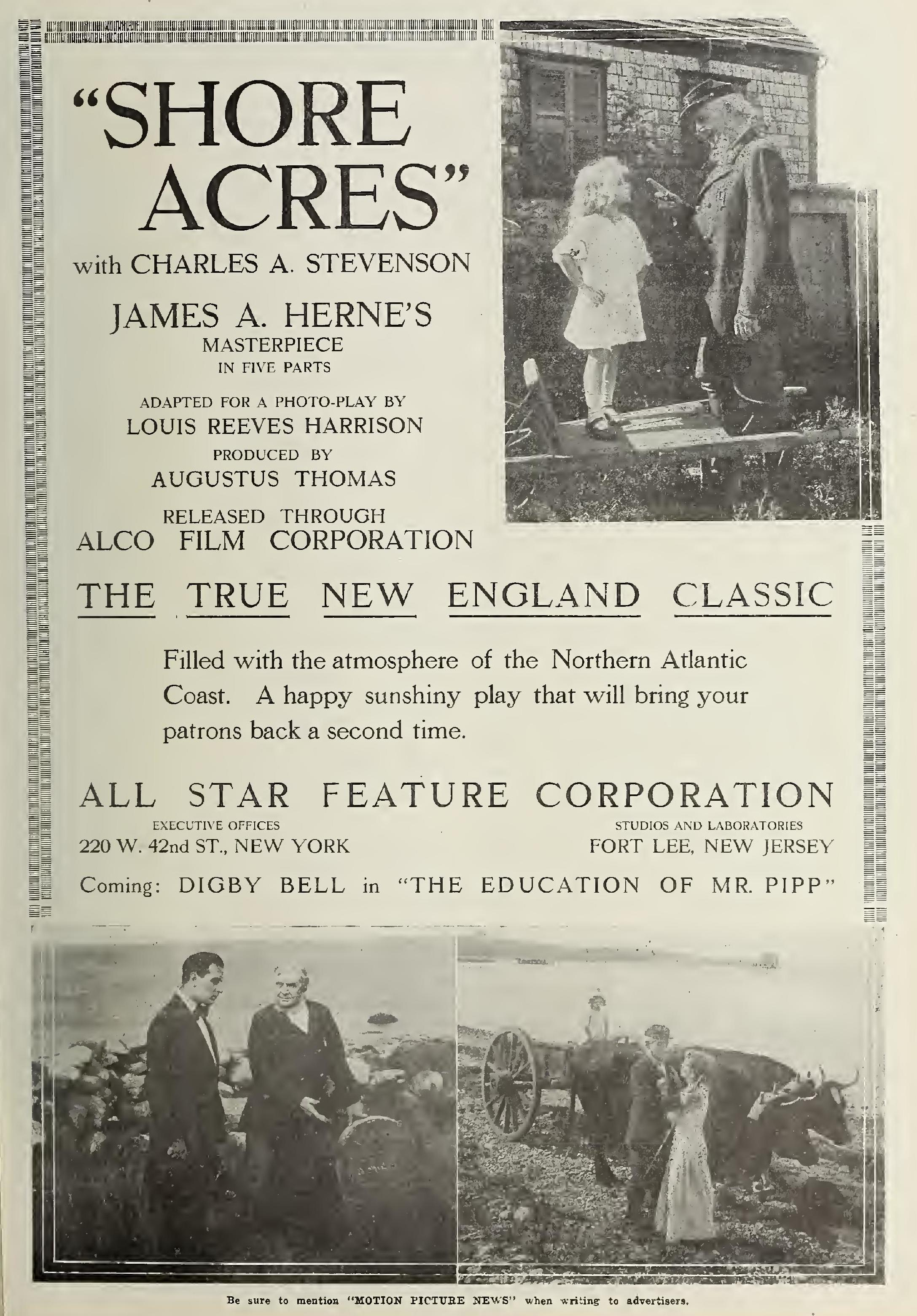
- Directed by: Jack Pratt
- Written by: Louis Reeves Harrison; Augustus Thomas
- Based on: Shore Acres by James A. Herne
- Starring: Charles A. Stevenson; Riley Hatch; Conway Tearle
- Cinematography: William C. Thompson
- Production company: All Star Feature Film Corporation
- Distributed by: Alco Films
- Release date: October 26, 1914
- Running time: 50 minutes
- Country: United States
- Languages: Silent; English intertitles

Shore Acres is a 1914 American silent drama film directed by Jack Pratt and starring Charles A. Stevenson, Riley Hatch and Conway Tearle. It is based on the 1893 play Shore Acres by James A. Herne, later also adapted into a 1920 film of the same title.

== Cast ==
- Charles A. Stevenson as Nathaniel Berry
- Riley Hatch as Martin Berry
- Conway Tearle as Sam Warner
- Edward Connelly as Josiah Blake
- Violet Horner as Helen Berry
- Gladys Fairbanks as Ann
- Harry Knowles as Captain Ben
- Philip Traub as Bob
- Madge Evans as Mildred

== Bibliography ==
- Goble, Alan. The Complete Index to Literary Sources in Film. Walter de Gruyter, 1999.
