= Marian Swayne =

American actress

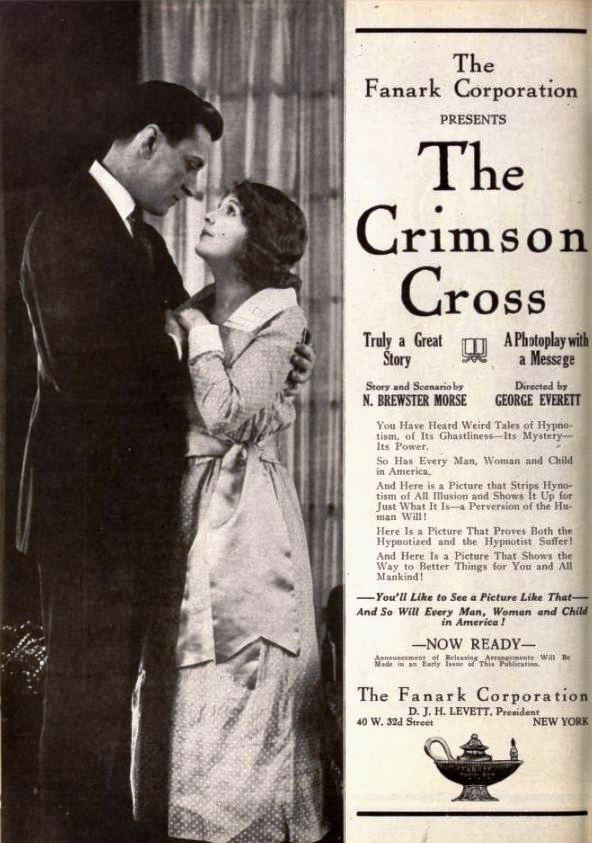
- Edward Langford and Swayne in The Crimson Cross (1921)
- Born: Marian Marguerita Swayne; July 9, 1891; Philadelphia, Pennsylvania, U.S.
- Died: August 21, 1973 (aged 82); New York City, U.S.
- Resting place: West Laurel Hill Cemetery, Bala Cynwyd, Montgomery County Pennsylvania USA
- Other name: Marion Swayne
- Occupation: Actress
- Years active: 1911-27
- Spouse: Joseph Levering (div. early 1930s)

Marian Swayne (July 9, 1891 - August 21, 1973) was an American stage and film actress.

== Biography ==
Swayne began her career with the Solax Studios in 1911 under the tutelage of Alice Guy-Blaché.

In 1917, J. Arthur Nelson, president of Dominion Film Corporation, announced that Swayne had signed a three-year contract to be the leading woman in that company's planned site in British Columbia. She also acted for Gaumont and Mutual Film.

Her film career ended in 1924, a few years before the silent film era ended. She performed on the stage as both Marian Swayne and Marion Swayne. Her work on Broadway included portraying June Phelps in Clouds (1925).

She was married to fellow screen player Joseph Levering. Swayne died in New York in August 1973.

== Selected filmography ==
- Falling Leaves (1912)
- Brennan of the Moor (1913)
- A House Divided (1913) as Diana Hutton
- The Little American (1917) as Mona
- The Deemster (1917)
- Little Miss Fortune (1917)
- The Road Between (1917)
- The Little Samaritan (1917)
- Crimson Cross (1921)
- The Man from Glengarry (1922)
- Counterfeit Love (1923)
