= Carl Gerard =

Danish-American actor (1885–1966)

Carl Gerard Hachero
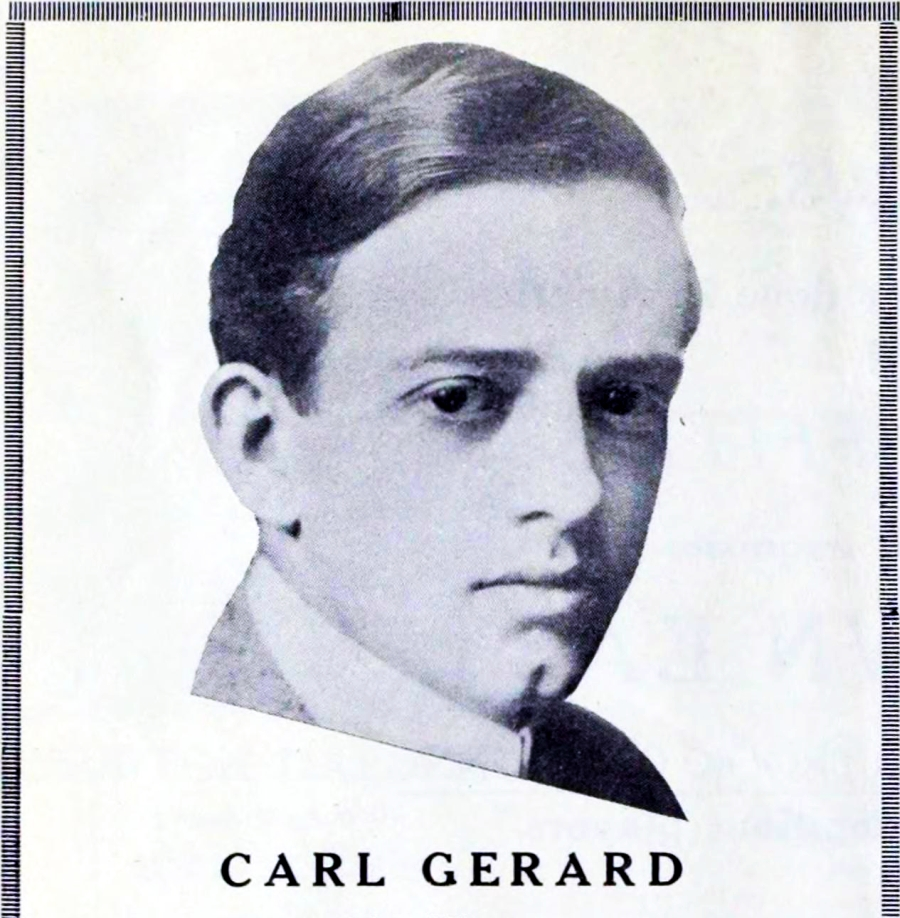
- Gerard c. 1920
- Born: Carl Gerhard Petersen; 28 September 1885; Copenhagen, Denmark
- Died: 6 January 1966 (aged 80); Los Angeles, California, U.S.
- Resting place: Hollywood Forever Cemetery
- Other name: Carl Gerrard
- Occupation: Actor
- Years active: 1915–1932
- Spouse: Ethel Grey Terry (m. 1910; died 1931)

Carl Gerard (born Carl Gerhard Petersen; 28 September 1885 – 6 January 1966), sometimes credited as Carl Gerrard, was a Danish-American actor known for playing supporting roles.

== Biography ==
Gerard spent much of his career in Los Angeles and once worked alongside legendary actor Boris Karloff in the film The Public Defender (1931), in which he and his colleagues attempt to protect a millionaire from being framed.

He married American actress Ethel Grey Terry in 1910 and remained with her until her death in 1931.

Gerard died on 6 January 1966 in Los Angeles of a heart attack at the age of 80. His ashes were interred at Hollywood Forever Cemetery along with his wife.

== Selected filmography ==
- The Family Stain (1915)
- The Vixen (1916)
- The Little American (1917)
- Crime and Punishment (1917)
- The Little Samaritan (1917)
- The Silver Horde (1920)
- Uncharted Seas (1921)
- The Great Reward (1921)
- The Hole in the Wall (1921)
- Youth to Youth (1922)
- Too Much Business (1922)
- Under Oath (1922)
- The Voice from the Minaret (1923)
- The Love Piker (1923)
- Wild Bill Hickok (1923)
- Up in Mabel's Room (1926)
- So This Is Love? (1928)
- That Certain Thing (1928)
- Confessions of a Wife (1928)
- Ladies of the Mob (1928)
- Leathernecking (1930)
- The Public Defender (1931)
- Bachelor Apartment (1931)
- Secret Service (1931)
- The Roadhouse Murder (1932)
