= Object: Alimony =

1928 film

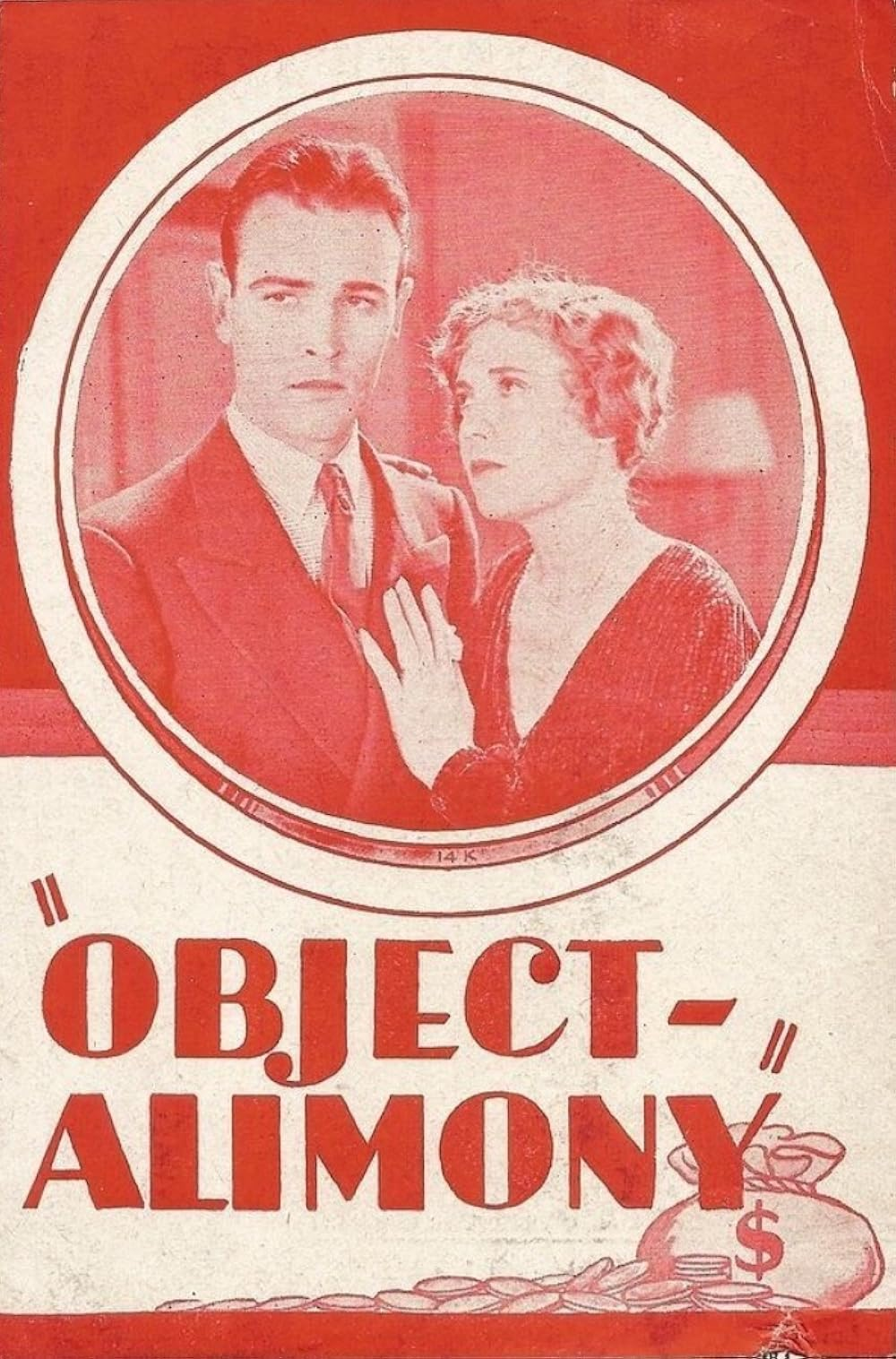
- Directed by: Scott R. Dunlap
- Written by: Sig Herzig (adaptation); Peter Milne
- Story by: Elmer Harris
- Produced by: Jack Cohn
- Starring: Lois Wilson; Hugh Allan; Ethel Grey Terry; Douglas Gilmore; Roscoe Karns
- Cinematography: Joseph Walker
- Edited by: Ben Pivar
- Production company: Columbia Pictures
- Distributed by: Columbia Pictures
- Release date: December 22, 1928
- Running time: 7 reels
- Country: United States
- Languages: Silent film (English intertitles)

Object: Alimony is a 1928 American silent drama film directed by Scott R. Dunlap and starring Lois Wilson, Hugh Allan, Ethel Grey Terry, Douglas Gilmore, and Roscoe Karns. The film was released by Columbia Pictures on December 22, 1928.

== Cast ==
- Lois Wilson as Ruth Rutledge
- Hugh Allan as Jimmy Rutledge
- Ethel Grey Terry as Mrs. Carrie Rutledge
- Douglas Gilmore as Renaud Graham
- Roscoe Karns as Al Bryant
- Carmelita Geraghty as Mabel
- Dickie Moore as Jimmy Rutledge Jr. (as Dickey Moore)
- Jane Keckley as Boardinghouse Owner
- Thomas A. Curran as Philip Stone (as Thomas Curran)

== Preservation ==
The film is now considered lost.
