= What Wives Want =

1923 film directed by Jack Conway

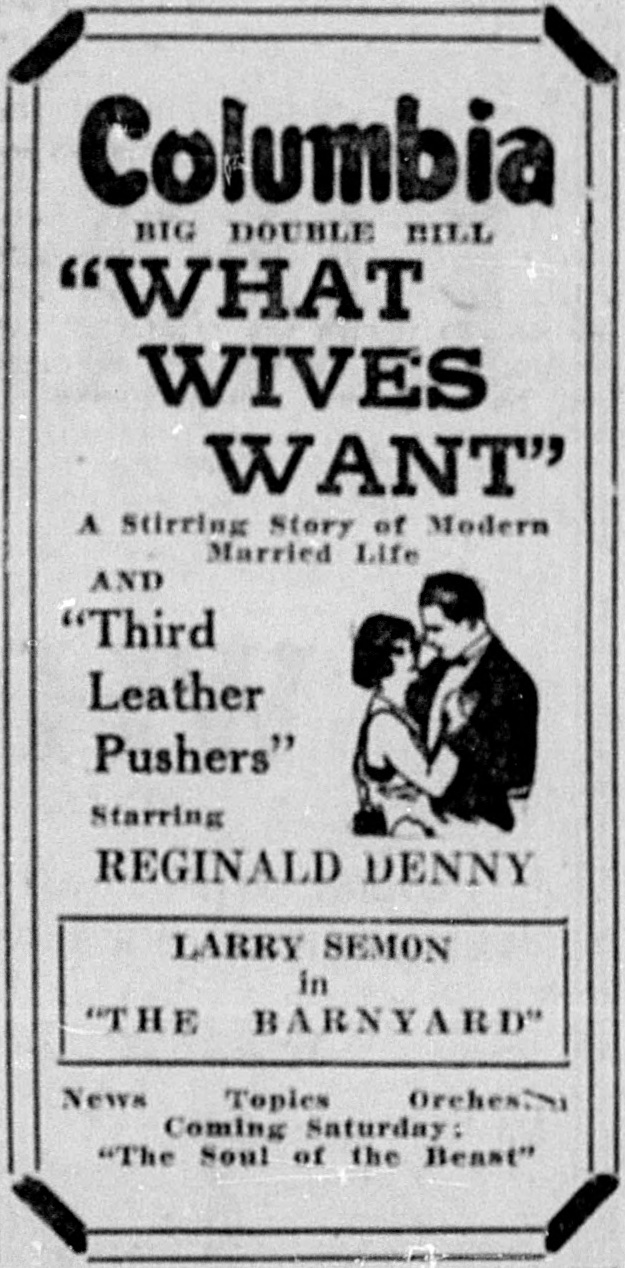
- Contemporary advertisement
- Directed by: Jack Conway
- Written by: Edward T. Lowe Jr.; Perry N. Vekroff
- Produced by: Carl Laemmle
- Starring: Ethel Grey Terry; Vernon Steele; Niles Welch
- Cinematography: Charles E. Kaufman
- Production company: Universal Pictures
- Distributed by: Universal Pictures
- Release date: May 6, 1923
- Running time: 5 reels
- Country: United States
- Languages: Silent; English intertitles

What Wives Want is a 1923 American silent drama film directed by Jack Conway and starring Ethel Grey Terry, Vernon Steele and Niles Welch.

== Cast ==
- Ethel Grey Terry as Claire Howard
- Vernon Steele as Austin Howard
- Ramsey Wallace as John Reeves
- Niles Welch as David Loring
- Margaret Landis as Alice Loring
- Lila Leslie as Mrs. Van Dusen
- Henry A. Barrows as Newhart

== Bibliography ==
- James Robert Parish & Michael R. Pitts. Film directors: a guide to their American films. Scarecrow Press, 1974.
