= The Hidden Valley =

1916 film by Ernest C. Warde

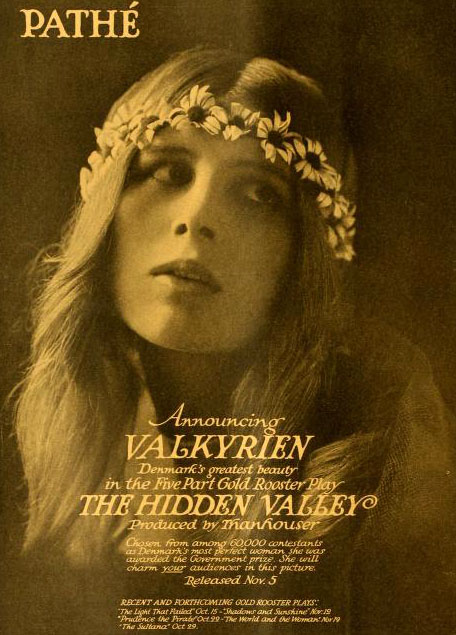
- Advertisement
- Directed by: Ernest Warde
- Written by: Emmett Mixx
- Produced by: Thanhouser Film Corporation - A Gold Rooster play Edwin Thanhouser
- Starring: Valda Valkyrien
- Cinematography: John M. Bauman
- Distributed by: Pathé Exchange
- Release date: November 5, 1916
- Running time: 5 reels
- Country: United States
- Language: Silent (English intertitles)

The Hidden Valley is a 1916 American silent adventure fantasy film produced by Thanhouser and distributed by Pathé and directed by Ernest Warde. The film stars Valda Valkyrien, an actress from Denmark who beat 60,000 other contestants for the role. The film takes place in exotic Africa but was filmed at Coquina Beach, Florida.

While this is an original story, it apparently is influenced by H. Rider Haggard's classic 1887 novel She.

== Cast ==
- Valda Valkyrien as The White Goddess
- Boyd Marshall as The Missionary
- Ernest C. Warde as The High Priest
- Arthur Bauer as The Ostrich Feather Importer
- Pauline Taylor
- Maud Traveller
- Jack Doolittle
