= What Fools Men =

1925 film

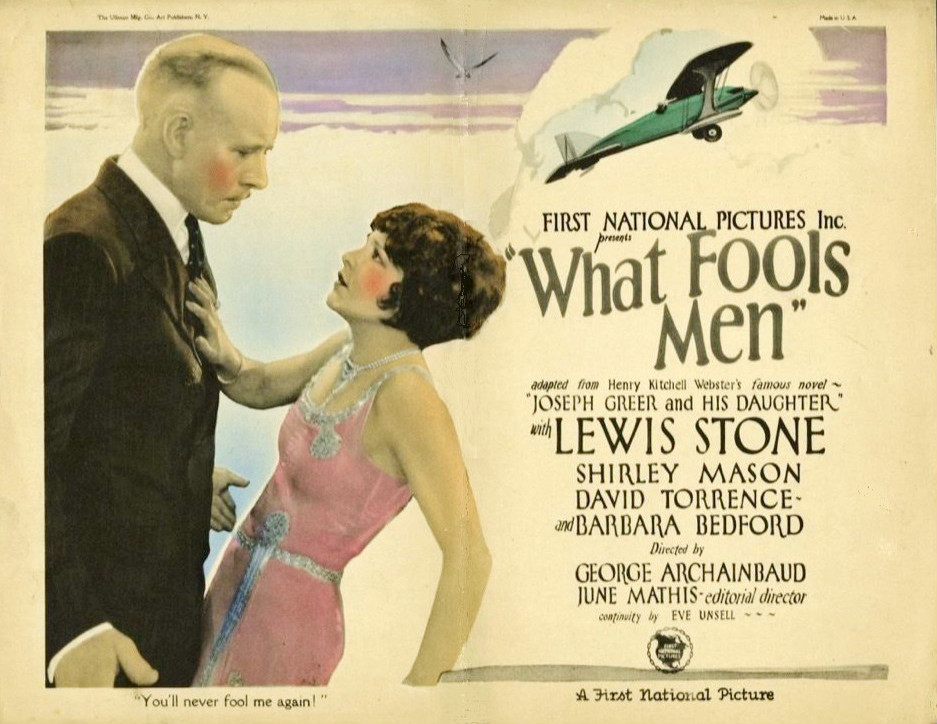
- Lobby card
- Directed by: George Archainbaud
- Written by: Eve Unsell
- Based on: Joseph Greer and His Daughter by Henry Kitchell Webster
- Starring: Lewis Stone; Shirley Mason; Ethel Grey Terry
- Cinematography: Norbert Brodine
- Edited by: Bert Moore
- Production company: First National Pictures
- Distributed by: First National Pictures
- Release date: September 6, 1925
- Running time: 80 minutes
- Country: United States
- Language: Silent (English intertitles)

What Fools Men is a lost 1925 American silent drama film directed by George Archainbaud and starring Lewis Stone, Shirley Mason, and Ethel Grey Terry.

== Plot ==
As described in a film magazine review, Joseph Greer has invented a new linen-making process and asks Williamson and his associates to finance him. Williamson and the others intend to swindle Greer, who gets his secretary, Jenny McFarlan to watch them. His wife, from whom he has been separated for years, wishes a divorce. Greer sends for his eighteen year old daughter whom he has never seen, and gives her an automobile and has her introduced into society. Mrs. Williamson attempts to have sex with Greer, who repulses her. She tells Williamson that Greer has forced his attentions on her. This strengthens Williamson’s resolve to break him. Greer goes on a business trip and leaves his daughter in Jenny’s charge. Beatrice one night goes to a wild party, from which she is rescued by her chauffeur, who loves her. Greer finds her intoxicated and discharges the chauffeur. Beatrice runs away and marries the chauffeur and Williamson succeeds in breaking Greer. Greer begins to drink and finally disappears. Jenny locates him. He returns, is reunited with his daughter, and decides to begin a new life with Jenny as his partner.

== Cast ==
- Lewis Stone as Joseph Greer
- Shirley Mason as Beatrice Greer
- Ethel Grey Terry as Violet Williamson
- Barbara Bedford as Jenny McFarlan
- John Patrick as Lancing Ware
- Hugh Allan as Burns
- David Torrence as Williamson
- Lewis Dayton as Henry Craven
- Joyce Compton as Dorothy
- Tom Wilson as Business Rival

== Preservation ==
With no prints of What Fools Men located in any film archives, it is a lost film.

== Bibliography ==
- Jacobs, Lea (2008). The Decline of Sentiment: American Film in the 1920s. University of California Press. ISBN 978-0-520-25457-2
