= Barney Gilmore =

American actor

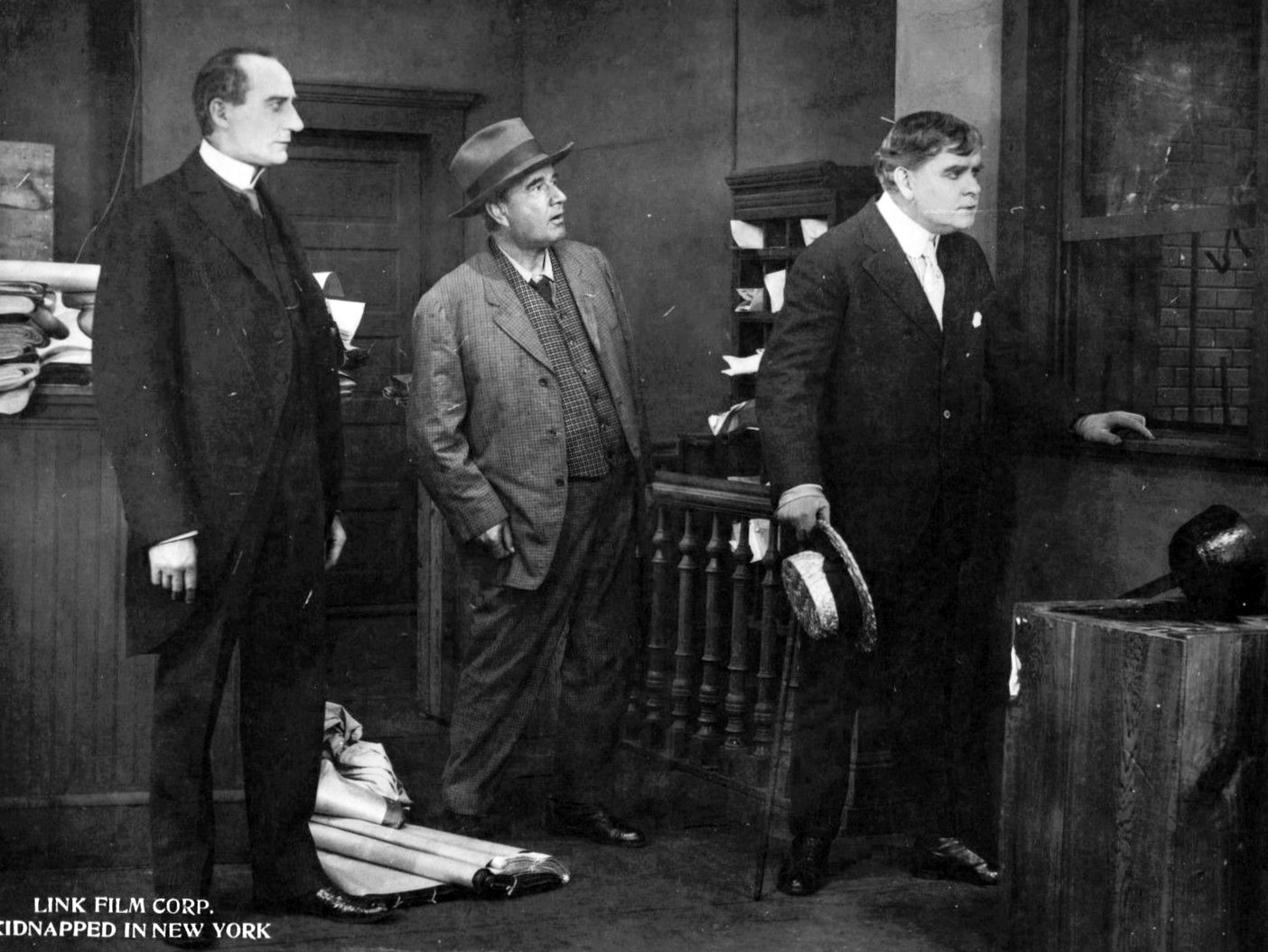

Barney Gilmore was an actor in the United States who appeared on stage and in films including starring roles. He appeared in the stage and screen versions of Howard Hall's Kidnapped in New York. He had comedic and character actor roles.

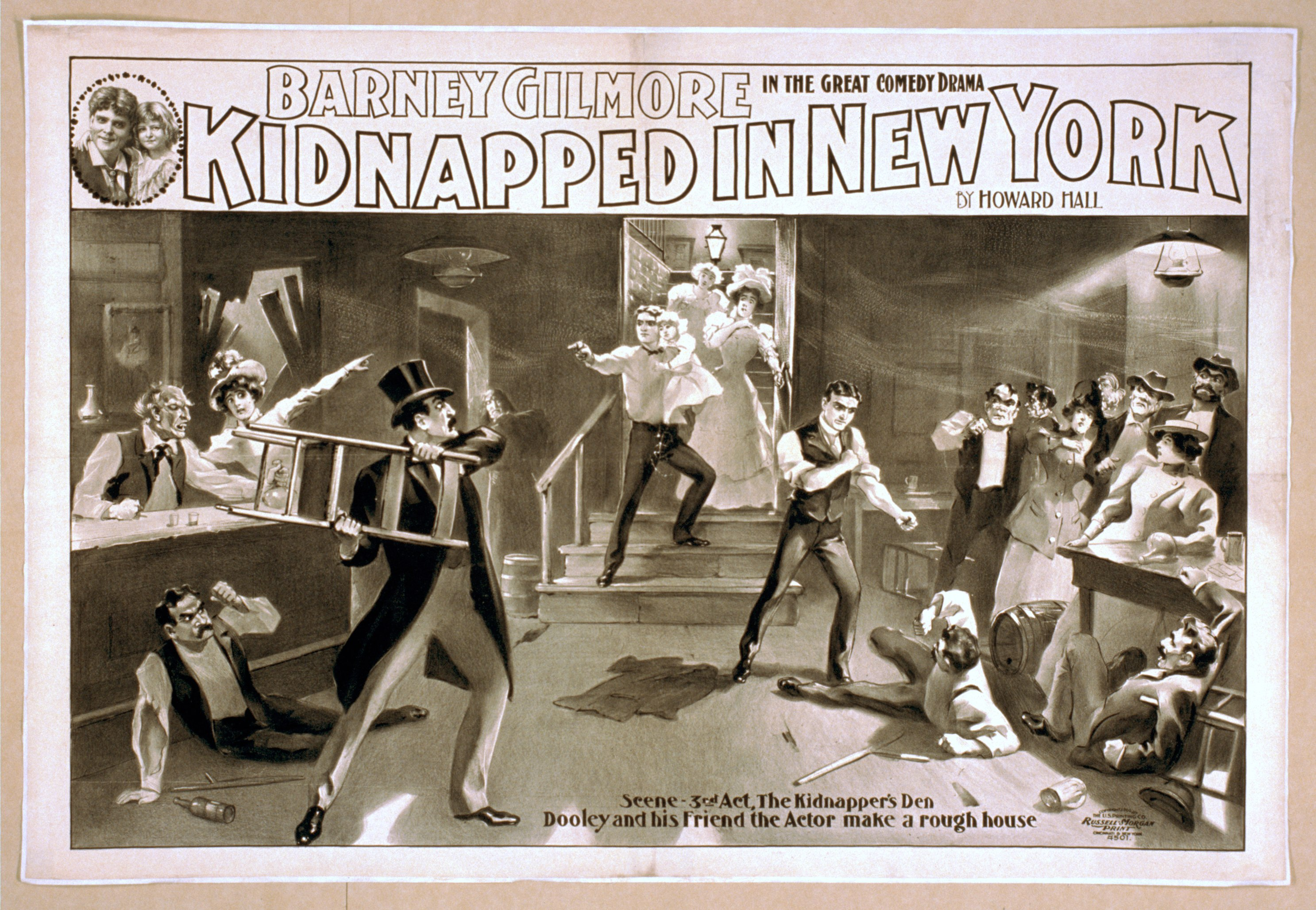

He worked for Solax Studios. He married Mina B. Long. Actress Lillian Gilmore was his daughter.

Gilmore was arrested in 1903 for spitting in St. Louis Missouri. He was the first person arrested under a law that prohibited public spitting in the state.

He was Irish. There is a photograph of him in the New York Public Library.

== Theater ==
- Kidnapped in New York
- New Empress

== Filmography ==
- Dublin Dan: The Irish Detective (1912) as Dublin Dan
- The Fight for Millions (1913)
- Kelly from the Emerald Isle (1913)
- Brennan of the Moor (1913) as Brennan of the Moor
- Kidnapped in New York (1914) as Detective Dooley
- The Game of Three (1915)
- The Man Who Made Good (1917) as Josiah Whitney
- The Weavers of Life (1917)
- Out of the Night (1918)
- Conquered Hearts (1918)
- The Man Worth While (1921) as the judge
- Almost a Lady (1926) as Mr. Pelly
- The Galloping Cowboy (1926) as Prof. Pinkleby
- Heroes in Blue (1927) as Pat Kelly
- South Sea Love (1927) as George Billways
- The Bandits Son as Amos Jordan
- Smiling Irish Eyes (1929) as County Fair Manager's Assistant
