= Ethel Grey Terry =

American actress (1882–1931)

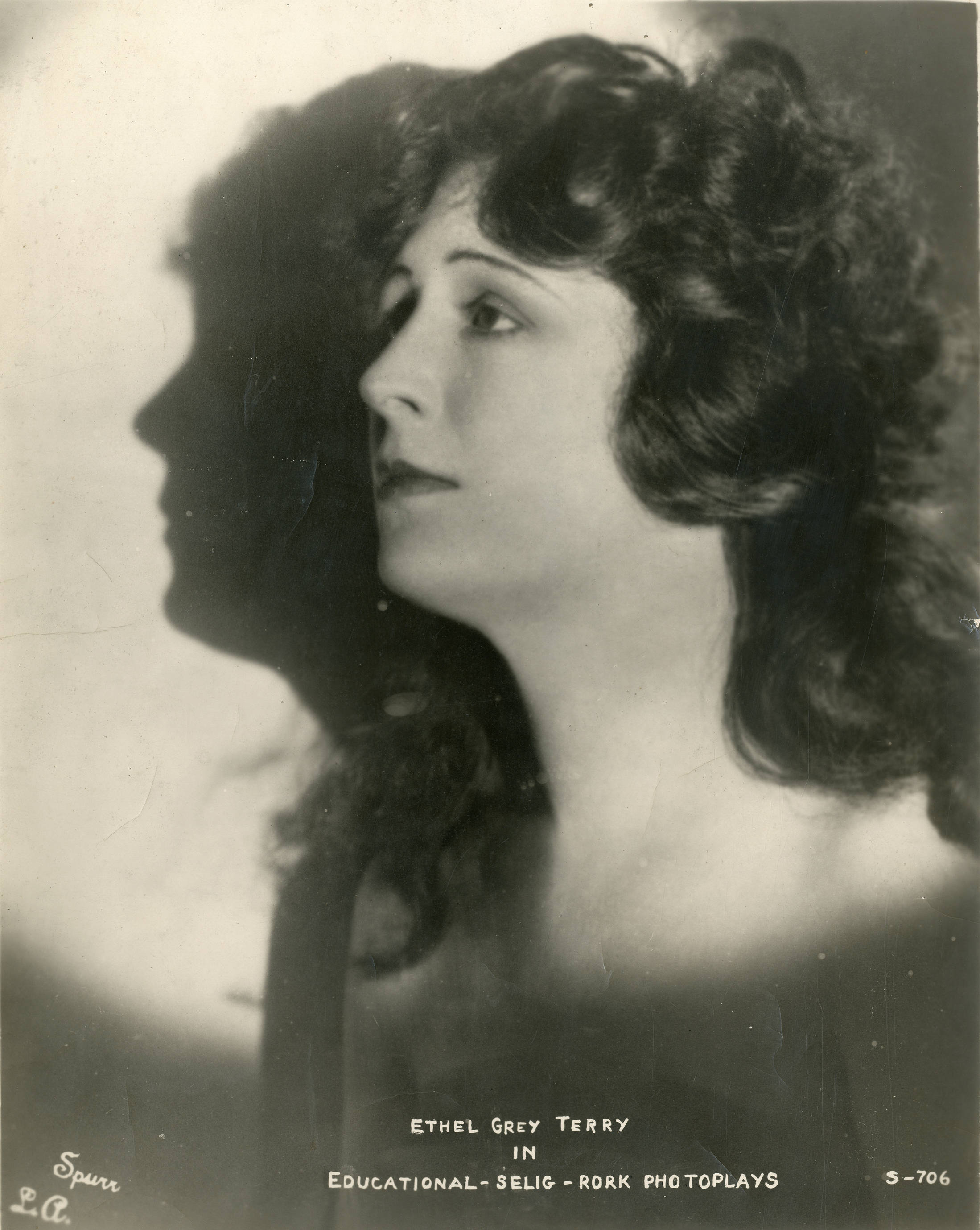
- Terry in 1922
- Born: October 2, 1882; Oakland, California, U.S.
- Died: January 6, 1931 (aged 48); Los Angeles, California, U.S.
- Resting place: Hollywood Forever Cemetery
- Occupation: Actress
- Years active: 1914–1928
- Spouse: Carl Gerard (m. 1910)
- Mother: Lillian Lawrence

Ethel Grey Terry (October 2, 1882 – January 6, 1931) was an American actress of the silent era. She is best remembered for her role in The Penalty with Lon Chaney.

== Early years ==
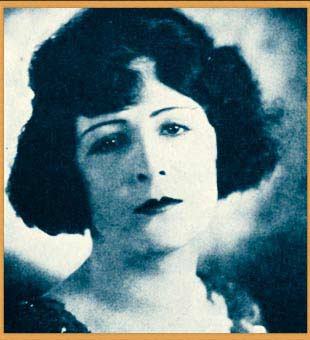
Publicity photo of Terry, 1925

Ethel Grey Terry was born in Oakland, California, the daughter of actress Lillian Lawrence, a single mother. She first appeared on stage, in a supporting role to Wallace Eddinger, when she was 5 years old. Raised in Roxbury, Massachusetts, Terry attended Notre Dame Academy for seven years. She had an early interest in art and planned to make her career in that field.

== Career ==
Terry appeared on Broadway for two years in David Belasco's productions and later performed in Shubert productions. Her Broadway credits included Honor Be Damned! (1927), Search Me (1915), The Smoldering Flame (1913), The Only Son (1911), and The Lily (1909). Her activities on stage included speaking the first line when the Little Theater opened in Los Angeles with a production of The Pigeon. She also had the female lead in Anatole at that theater and portrayed the mother in Civilian Clothes when it was presented in Chicago.

Terry operated a stock theater company in Schenectady, New York, and it also presented plays in Boston, Minneapolis, and St. Paul. Terry appeared in 52 films between 1914 and 1928, sometimes as a leading lady but often in supporting roles.

== Personal life and death ==
She married Danish actor Carl Gerard in 1910 and remained with him until her death.

On January 6, 1931, following a year's illness, Terry died at her home in Hollywood, aged 48. Her ashes were interred at Hollywood Forever Cemetery.

== Selected filmography ==
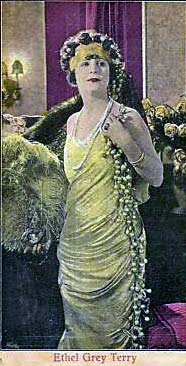
Terry's portrayal of Rose in The Penalty (1920)

- The Sign of the Cross (1914)
- Intolerance (1916)
- The Secret of the Storm Country (1917)
- Vengeance Is Mine (1917)
- Arsene Lupin (1917)
- A Doll's House (1918)
- Just for Tonight (1918)
- Phil for Short (1919)
- The Mystery of the Yellow Room (1919)
- Going Some (1920)
- The Penalty (1920)
- Food for Scandal (1920)
- A Thousand to One (1920)
- Habit (1921)
- The Breaking Point (1921)
- Shattered Idols (1922)
- Too Much Business (1922)
- Travelin' On (1922)
- The Crossroads of New York (1922)
- Oath-Bound (1922)
- The Kickback (1922)
- Under Two Flags (1922)
- Peg o' My Heart (1922)
- Brass (1923)
- What Wives Want (1923)
- Why Women Remarry (1923)
- Garrison's Finish (1923)
- The Unknown Purple (1923)
- Wild Bill Hickok (1923)
- The Self-Made Wife (1923)
- The Fast Worker (1924)
- Old Shoes (1925)
- What Fools Men (1925)
- Hard Boiled (1926)
- The Love Toy (1926)
- The Cancelled Debt (1927)
- Modern Mothers (1928)
- Confessions of a Wife (1928)
- Object: Alimony (1928)
