= Gladys Fairbanks =

American silent film actress

Gladys Fairbanks (April 15, 1892 in California – November 2, 1958 in Alameda, California), was an American silent film actress of the 1910s. She was best known for roles in films such as The Poor Little Rich Girl (1917), The Road Between (1917) and Shore Acres (1914).

Fairbanks's Broadway credits include The Poor Little Rich Girl (1913), The Road to Happiness (1915), and Redemption (1918), the latter of which starred John Barrymore.

== Filmography ==
- Shore Acres as Ann (1914)
- The Poor Little Rich Girl as Jane (1917)
- The Road Between as Sarah Abbott (1917)
- Who's Your Neighbor? as Mrs Bowers (1917)
- The Outsider as Miss Price (1917)
- Our Little Wife (1917) (uncredited)
