= Wild Bill Hickok (film) =

1923 film

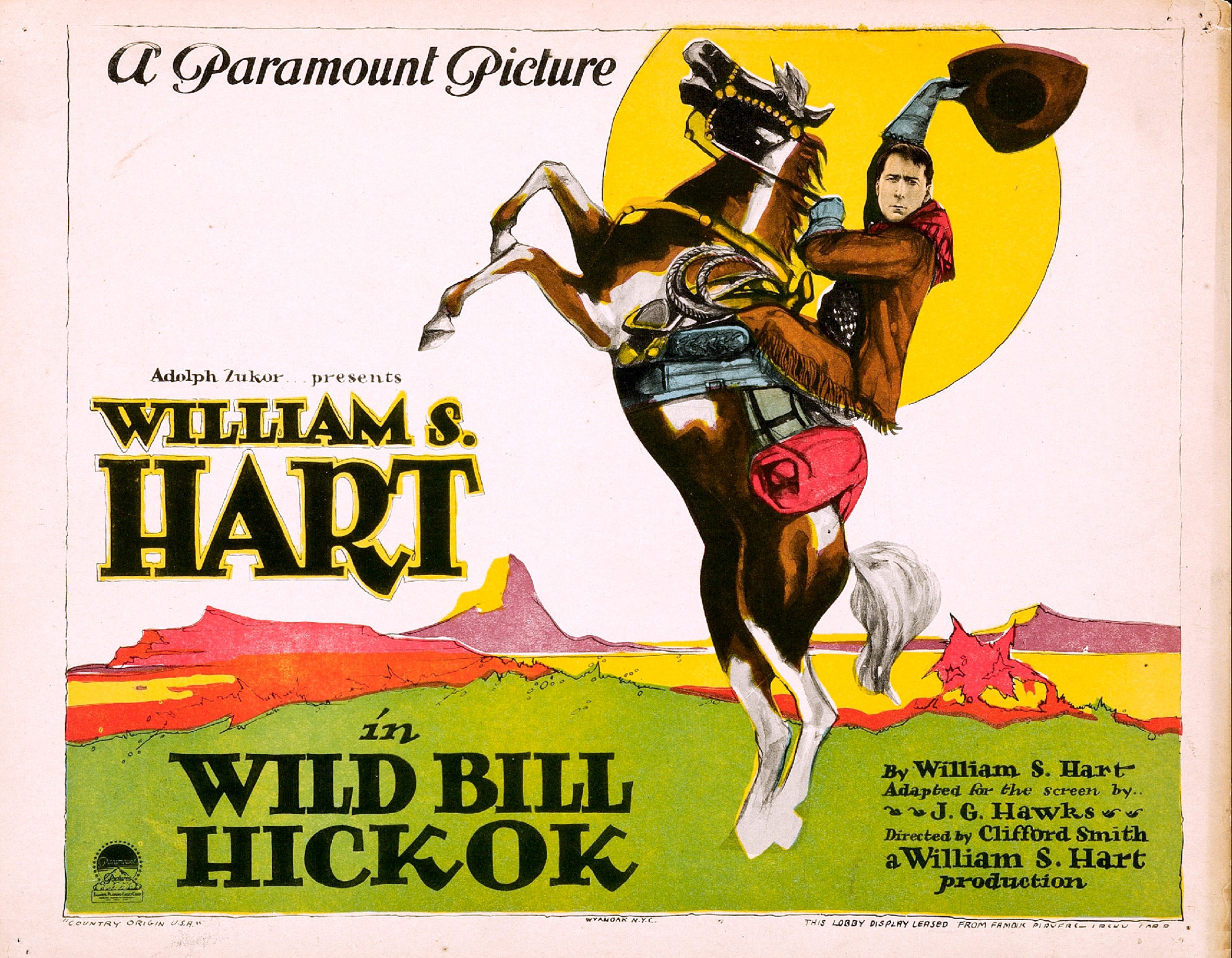
- Lobby card
- Directed by: Clifford Smith
- Written by: William S. Hart; J.G. Hawks
- Produced by: Adolph Zukor; William S. Hart
- Starring: William S. Hart; Ethel Grey Terry; Kathleen O'Connor; James Farley; Jack Gardner; Carl Gerard; William Dyer
- Cinematography: Arthur Reeves; Dwight Warren
- Production company: Famous Players–Lasky Corporation
- Distributed by: Paramount Pictures
- Release date: November 18, 1923
- Running time: 70 minutes
- Country: United States
- Languages: Silent; English intertitles

Wild Bill Hickok is a 1923 American silent Western film directed by Clifford Smith and starring William S. Hart, Ethel Grey Terry, Kathleen O'Connor, James Farley, Jack Gardner, Carl Gerard, and William Dyer. It was written by William S. Hart and J.G. Hawks. The film was released on November 18, 1923, by Paramount Pictures. It was the first film to depict Wyatt Earp, although in a very brief role, and the only film made before he died in 1929 that included his character, until Law and Order was released in 1932.

== Plot ==
After the American Civil War ends, key military and government leaders meet in Washington D.C. Gunfighter Wild Bill Hickok goes to Dodge City where he hangs up his gun belt and takes over a card table. Local lawmen are unable to rid the town of lawless cowboys. Hickok's arch-enemy and gang leader Jack McQueen accuses Hickok of losing his nerve. Hickok visits General Custer and retrieves his sword, taking up his role as a fighter for what is right.

He returns to Dodge City and enlists the help of friends Wyatt Earp, Calamity Jane, Bat Masterson, Doc Holliday, Charlie Bassett, Luke Short and Bill Tilghman to chase the bad guys out of town. Hickcok falls for the wife of George Hamilton. Pursued for his crimes, McQueen leaves town and gets away; follows him and kills him. Hickok departs Dodge City in sorrow since the woman he loved was already married.

== Characters ==
Movie still of Bert Lindley as Wyatt Earp

William S. Hart, who played Wild Bill Hickok, and Wyatt Earp were best friends. Earp wanted Hart's help to make a movie that would improve what the public thought about him and his brothers. Based on what the press wrote about his actions at the Gunfight at the O.K. Corral and his job as a referee of the Fitzsimmons vs. Sharkey boxing match, Earp had a dubious reputation. Earp wrote Hart in July 1925: "I am sure that if the story were exploited on the screen by you, it would do much towards setting me right before the public which has always been fed up with lies about me."

Bert Lindley playing Wyatt Earp appeared very briefly in a crowd scene. This was the first movie that depicted Wyatt Earp, and the only one that included his character before he died in 1929. Hollywood didn't make another film that referenced his character until Law and Order in 1932.

== Cast ==
- William S. Hart as Wild Bill Hickok
- Ethel Grey Terry as Calamity Jane
- Kathleen O'Connor as Elaine Hamilton
- James Farley as Jack McQueen
- Jack Gardner as Bat Masterson
- Carl Gerard as Clayton Hamilton
- William Dyer as Col. Horatio Higginbotham
- Bert Sprotte as Bob Wright
- Leo Willis as Joe McCord
- Naida Carle as Fanny Kate
- Herschel Mayall as Gambler
- Bert Lindley as Wyatt Earp

== Marketing ==
The film premiered in New York city on November 18, two weeks before its public release on December 3, 1923.

Despite his very small role, Earp was prominently featured in the promotional copy as "Deputy Sheriff to Bat Masterson of Dodge City, known as one of the three greatest gun-men that ever lived, along with Bat Masterson and 'Wild Bill' Hickok... Back in the days when the West was young and wild, 'Wild Bill' fought and loved and adventured with such famous frontiersmen as Bat Masterson and Wyatt Earp." In reality, Earp was a virtually unknown assistant marshal in Dodge City when Wild Bill Hickok was murdered in 1876.

Earp served as a technical adviser on the film. Because the role of Earp's character in the movie is so small, Bert Lindley is not listed on some descriptions of the movie and this portrayal of Earp is often overlooked. Alan Barra, author of Inventing Wyatt Earp: His Life and Many Legends, overlooked this movie in his biography.

Hart thought a great deal of Wyatt Earp and Bat Masterson, and after Masterson's death in 1921, dedicated his next film, Wild Bill Hickok to Masterson.

== Reception ==
The film was not well received. The film's poor box office draw helped end Hart's already fading star.

== Preservation ==
A print of Wild Bill Hickok is maintained in the Museum of Modern Art and Cinematheque Royale de Belgique film archives.
