= Kidnapped in New York =

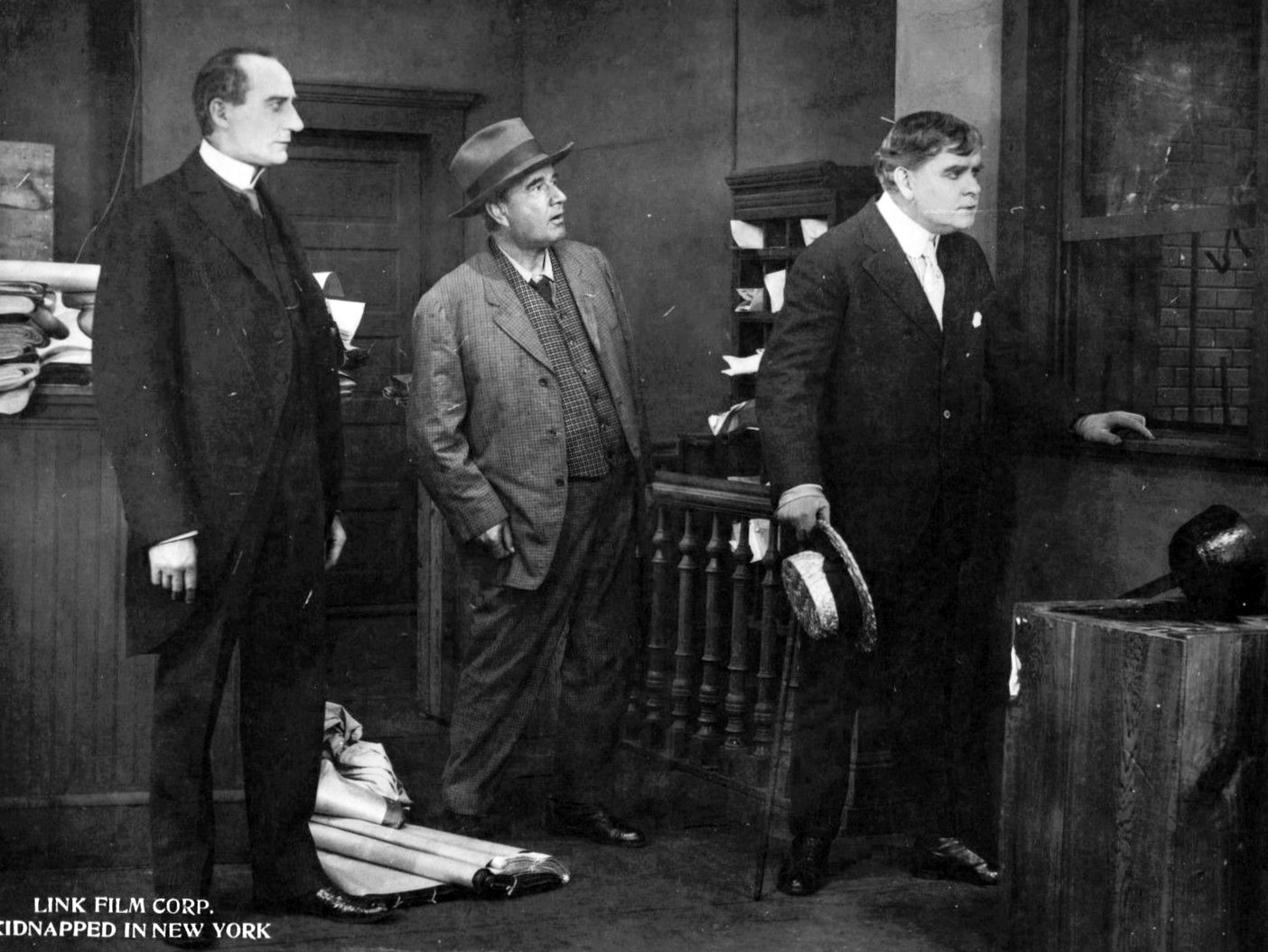
- Lobby card
- Starring: Barney Gilmore
- Distributed by: Sterling Camera and Film Company
- Release date: 1914
- Running time: 40 minutes
- Country: United States
- Language: Silent (English intertitles)

Kidnapped in New York is a 1914 American silent drama short film starring Barney Gilmore. It followed the stage version of Howard Hall's play inspired by "true events". The film survives and has been released on DVD.

== Synopsis ==
Detective Dooley (Barney Gilmore) goes undercover in an Italian immigrant neighborhood posing as a harmless drunk in order to find a wealthy man's daughter and nurse who had been kidnapped by criminals.

== Cast ==
- Barney Gilmore as Detective Dooley
- Marie Osborne as Toots, the Baby (credited as Baby Osborne)
- Violet Stuart as The Nurse (credited as Violet Stewart)
