= The Self-Made Wife =

1923 film by John Francis Dillon

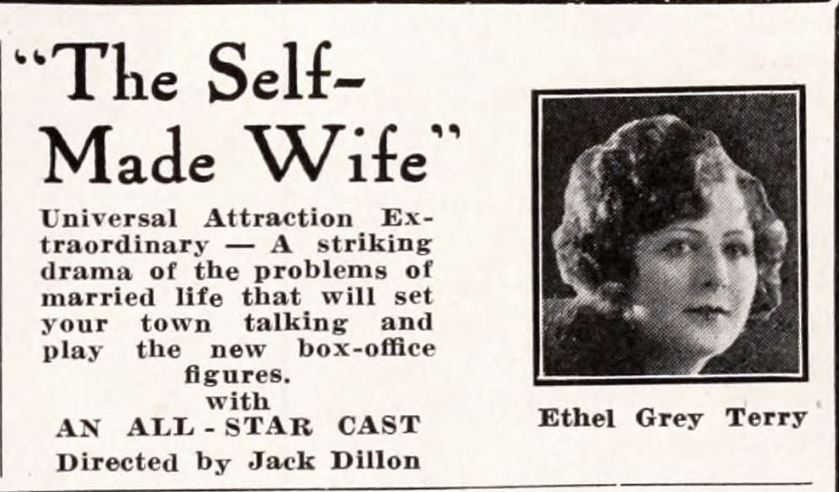
- Directed by: John Francis Dillon
- Written by: Albert G. Kenyon
- Based on: "The Self-Made Wife" by Elizabeth Alexander
- Produced by: Carl Laemmle
- Starring: Ethel Grey Terry; Crauford Kent; Virginia Ainsworth
- Cinematography: William E. Fildew
- Production company: Universal Pictures
- Release date: July 8, 1923 (US)
- Running time: 5 reels
- Country: United States
- Language: Silent (English intertitles)

The Self-Made Wife is a 1923 American silent melodrama film, directed by John Francis Dillon. It stars Ethel Grey Terry, Crauford Kent, and Virginia Ainsworth, and was released on July 8, 1923. It was written by Albert G. Kenyon based upon the short story "The Self-Made Wife" by Elizabeth Alexander.

== Cast list ==
- Ethel Grey Terry as Corrie Godwin
- Crauford Kent as Tim Godwin
- Virginia Ainsworth as Dodo Sears
- Phillips Smalley as J. D. Sears
- Dorothy Cumming as Elena Vincent
- Maurice Murphy as Tim Godwin Jr.
- Turner Savage as Jimmy Godwin
- Honora Beatrice as The baby
- Tom McGuire as Hotchkiss
- Laura La Varnie as Mrs. Satter
- Matthew Betz as Bob
- Frank Butler as Allerdyce
