= Counterfeit Love =

1923 silent film

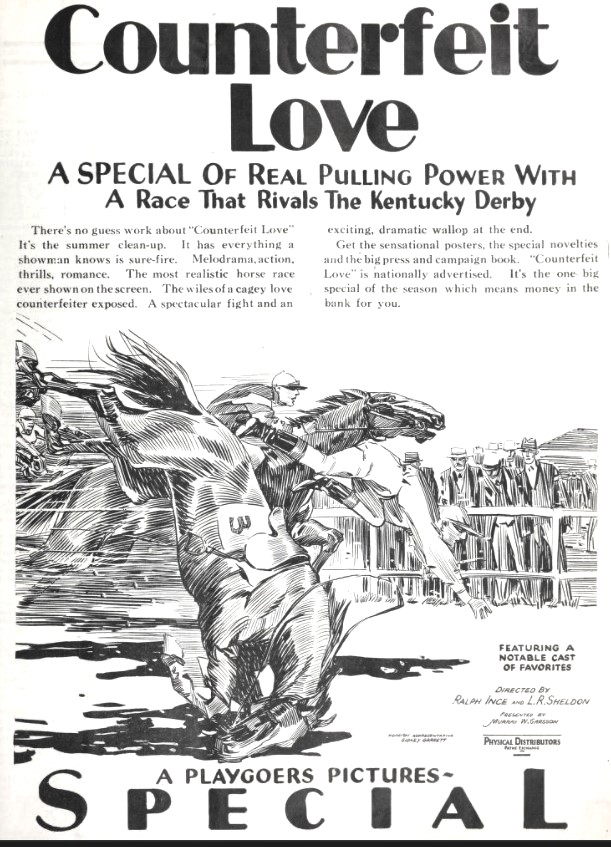
- Directed by: Ralph Ince
- Written by: Thomas F. Fallon; Adeline Leitzbach
- Starring: Joe King; Marian Swayne; Jack Richardson
- Cinematography: William J. Black
- Production company: Murray W. Garsson Productions
- Distributed by: Playgoers Pictures
- Release date: June 10, 1923
- Running time: 60 minutes
- Country: United States
- Languages: Silent; English intertitles

Counterfeit Love is a 1923 American silent drama film directed by Ralph Ince and starring Joe King, Marian Swayne and Jack Richardson.

== Cast ==
- Joe King as Richard Wayne
- Marian Swayne as Mary Shelly
- Norma Lee as Rose Shelly
- Jack Richardson as Roger Crandall
- Irene Boyle as Miss Ferris
- Isabel Fisher as Mabel Ford
- Alexander Giglio as George Shelly
- Danny Hayes as Bill Grigg
- Frances Miller as Mandy
- William Jenkins as Mose

== Bibliography ==
- Munden, Kenneth White. The American Film Institute Catalog of Motion Pictures Produced in the United States, Part 1. University of California Press, 1997.
