= The Deemster (1917 film) =

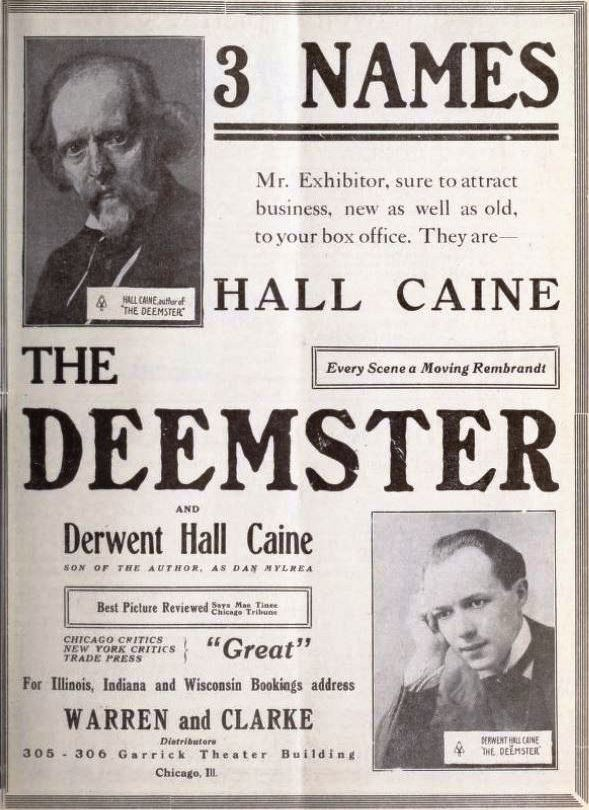
- Directed by: Howell Hansel
- Written by: Hall Caine (novel and play); Edfrid A. Bingham (scenario); Charles A. Taylor (scenario)
- Produced by: W.E. Shallenberger
- Starring: Derwent Hall Caine; Marian Swayne
- Cinematography: Henry Cronjager
- Edited by: Henry A. Butterfield
- Production company: Arrow Film Corporation
- Distributed by: State Rights
- Release date: February 24, 1917
- Running time: 9 Reels
- Country: United States
- Languages: Silent film (English intertitles)

The Deemster is a 1917 American silent drama film, released by Arrow Film Corporation, directed by Howell Hansel, starring Derwent Hall Caine and Marian Swayne.

== Plot ==
The plot description in the February 24, 1917 issue of Moving Picture World reads:

Daniel Mylrea is the son of the Bishop of Man, the baron of the Isle of Man, whose temporal power is higher even than that of the Deemster, or governor. The Bishop desires Dan to become a minister, but he prefers to be a fisherman. The Deemster of Man has a son and a daughter, Mona and Ewan. Dan and Mona are in love. She consents to marry him when he can obtain her father's consent. Ewan, her brother, decides to become a clergyman, even in the face of his father's insistence that he take up business as a vocation.

The Deemster opposes Dan's suit for Mona's hand because he has fallen from his high estate as the son of the Bishop by becoming a fisherman. His dislike turns to open hatred when Dan endeavors to borrow money from Ewan, whom he thought his friend, to pay off the crew of his boat. Dan had squandered his earnings of the season in drink. Ewan refuses Dan the loan, who makes him a bitter enemy by knocking him down on his taunt that spending money in drink is as bad as theft. Dan is now opposed in his love for Mona by both her father and brother. The Deemster forbids Dan to come to his house to visit her. Despite this, he sees her at night. Though this meeting is innocent in intent, the Deemster uses it to inflame the mind of Ewan against Dan, whom he supposes has dishonored his sister.

Arming himself with a knife, Ewan seeks Dan and comes upon him at his cabin while he is mending his nets. They quarrel and Ewan falls backward over a cliff and is killed. Dan's crew of fishermen throw the body into the sea, hoping to hide his death, but the tide sweeps it ashore. It is discovered and suspicion of murder falls on Dan. He is arrested by the Deemster's constables and committed to jail, where he is visited at night by his father, the Bishop, who gives him an opportunity to escape. Dan refuses to go, feeling that he must atone for Ewan's death. Dan is tried on Tynwald Hill, the ancient law mount. The Deemster insists that the Bishop shall exercise his legal prerogative as the highest civil power on the isle and sit at this trial. He aims to force the Bishop to sentence his own son on the gallows. Dan is convicted. The Deemster insists on the death sentence being passed by the Bishop, who, instead of condemning Dan to be hanged, decrees that his son shall be cut off from the people, no tongue to speak to him, no hand to touch him, and. in death, no hand to bury him.

Dan is driven away, and for seven years lives alone in a hut by the sea. Then a plague strikes the people of Man. The Bishop has learned of a monk in Ireland who has discovered an antidote for the pestilence and sends for him. The monk comes to the isle on a vessel which is wrecked on the shore near Dan's desolate hut. He dies in Dan's arms, who then dons the monk's garb and carries the antidote to the people, as he had been commanded by the dying cleric. When there is but one powder of the antidote left Dan learns that the Deemster is a victim of the plague. When he faces his enemy to minister to him. he finds himself stricken. Either he or the Deemster must die. Revealing himself to the Deemster he chooses to die himself, hopeless under his father's irrevocable sentence to a living death. Giving the Deemster the healing powder he staggers away to his hut. There he is followed by Mona and dies in her arms.

== Cast ==
- Derwent Hall Caine as Dan Mylrea
- Marian Swayne as Mona
- Sidney Bracy as Bishop, Dan’s Father
- Albert Froom as Deemster, Mona’s and Ewan’s father
- Kenneth Barnes Clarendon as Ewan
- Alexander Hall as Davey, Dan’s Faithful Friend
- James Levering as Quayle
- Ben Lodge as Billy Quilleash
- Thomas O’Malley as Hommy Beg
- Lee Post as Fisherman
- William V Miller as Fisherman
- Freeman Barnes as Fisherman

== Production background ==
Originally entitled The Bishop’s Son the film was announced by the Arrow Film Company as the first of their series of special seven and eight reel productions. It is based on Hall Caine’s 1887 novel The Deemster and his 1910 stage adaptation of the novel The Bishop’s Son in which his son Derwent Hall Caine produced and played the same role as in the film.

The costumes are identical with those used in the London stage production. They were brought from England by Derwent Hall Caine.

Over 100,000 feet of negative was shot on location at Block Island, Rhode Island and at Arrow’s studio at Yonkers.

Hall Caine remained in London, England during the First World War so when he granted exclusive film rights on his novel The Deemster negotiations were carried out by Derwent Hall Caine as W. E. Shallenberger had business commitments that prevented him from travelling to meet with Hall Caine. Arrow sent a representative to the Isle of Man to take many photos of the locations of the story under Hall Caine’s personal direction. Due to the war and English censorship the American Consul assisted in getting the photos and accompanying graphic plans and panoramic views to America. Prior to making the film the locations were photographed and sent to Hall Caine for his approval.

Carpenters and masons were sent to Block Island and built the replica of a Manx village, following the plans and specifications faithfully. Hall Caine had trained as an architect prior to becoming a writer. The houses built for the film were constructed of stone and concrete throughout, and were afterwards sold to the island’s inhabitants. The interior shots were taken in the houses and not in a studio.
