= Hugh Allan (actor) =

American actor

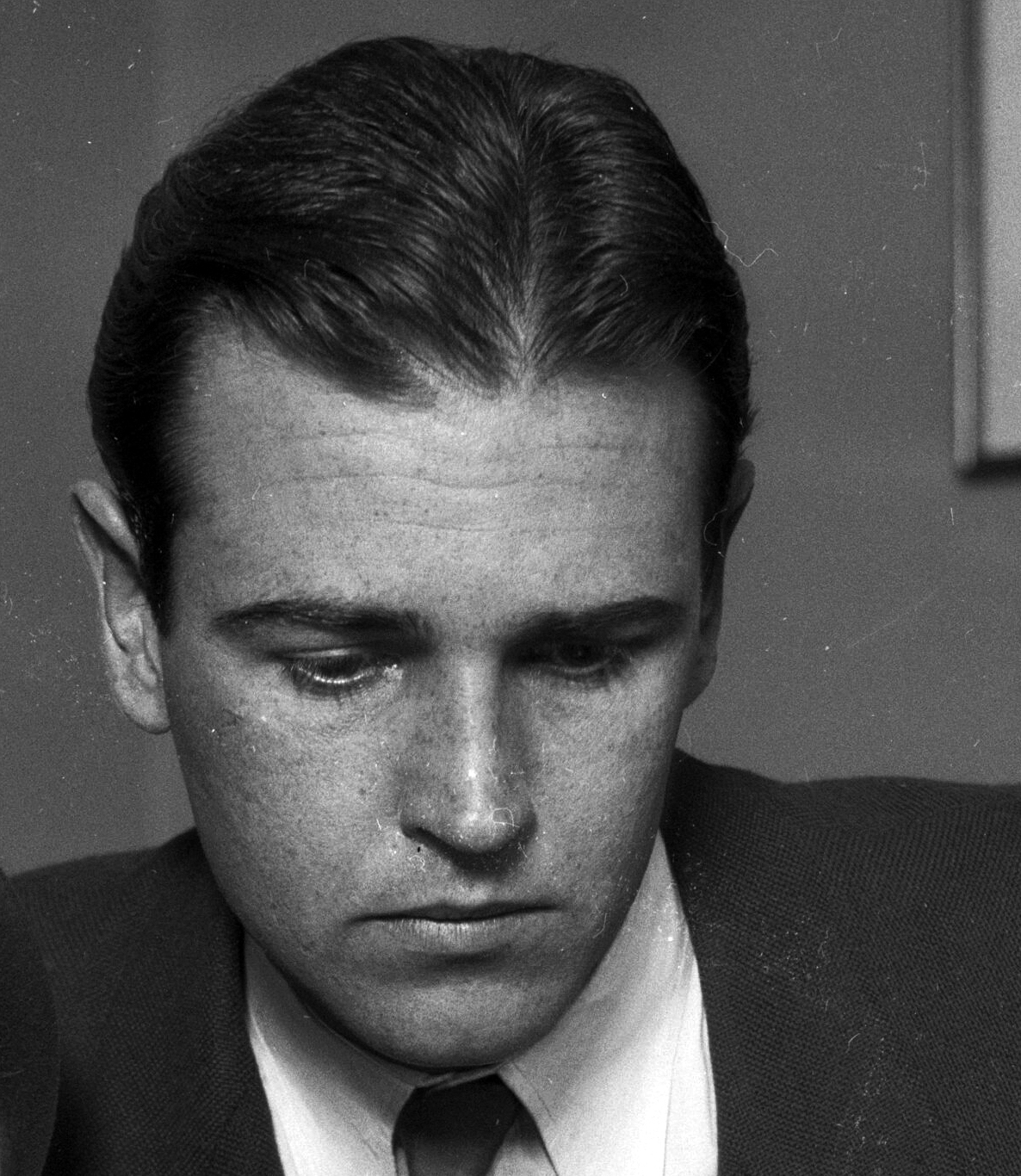
- Hugh Allan in 1930
- Born: Allan Hughes; November 5, 1903; Oakland, California
- Died: February 12, 1997 (aged 93)
- Resting place: Memorial Park Cemetery, Memphis

Hugh Allan (born Allan Hughes; November 5, 1903 – February 12, 1997) was an American actor. He had several lead roles. He was born Allan Abram Hughes in Oakland, California.

After graduating from Freemont High School in Oakland in 1923, Allan worked in San Francisco for the Cunard Line. After that job, he had his first employment with the film industry, working as secretary to the producer of Hollywood Photoplay Productions. He also was a film cutter and an assistant cameraman before he appeared on camera, in a bit part in a Richard Talmadge film. After he had small roles in two other films, First National Pictures gave him a five-year contract.

Allan married Lou Williamson. He died in Memphis in 1997. He is buried at Memorial Park Cemetery in Memphis.

== Critical response ==
An article in Theatre Management magazine in 1927 called Allan "a splended actor, finely built and exceptionally good looking". A reviewer describing The Fire Detective wrote that he makes a personable hero. His role in Wild Beauty was described as being carried out ably but not with a lot of charisma.

== Filmography ==
Year	Title	Role	Notes
1925	What Fools Men	Burns	
1925	Transients in Arcadia	Jimmy Harrington	Short
1926	The Block Signal	Jack Milford	
1926	Home Sweet Home		
1927	Birds of Prey	Hamilton Smith Jr	
1927	What Happened to Father?	Tommy Dawson	
1927	The Cruel Truth	Reggie Copeley	
1927	Wild Beauty	Bill Moran	
1927	Good Time Charley	John Hartwell Jr	
1927	Dress Parade	Stuart Haldane	
1928	Beware of Married Men	Ralph	
1928	Hold 'Em Yale	Jack Bradbury	
1928	Plastered in Paris	Hugh	
1928	Annapolis	Herbert	
1928	Object: Alimony	Jimmy Rutledge	
1928	The Tiger's Shadow	Larry Trent	
1929	The Voice of the Storm	Tom Powers	
1929	Sin Town	'Silk' Merrick	
1929	The Fire Detective	Capt. Jeff Tarrant	
1930	A Royal Flush		Short, (final film role)
