= Magda (1917 film) =

1917 film by Emile Chautard

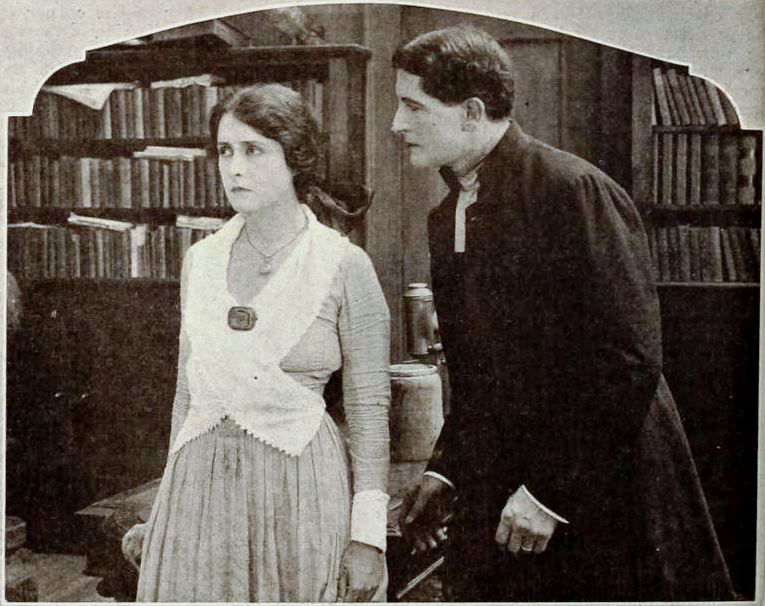
- Still with Clara Kimball Young and Thomas Holding
- Directed by: Emile Chautard
- Written by: Margaret Turnbull
- Based on: Heimat by Hermann Sudermann
- Produced by: Clara Kimball Young; Lewis J. Selznick
- Starring: Clara Kimball Young; Alice Gale; Valda Valkyrien
- Cinematography: Jacques Bizeul
- Production company: Clara Kimball Young Film Corporation
- Distributed by: Selznick Pictures
- Release date: October 1917
- Running time: 5 reels
- Country: United States
- Language: Silent (English intertitles)

Magda is a 1917 American silent drama film directed by Emile Chautard and starring Clara Kimball Young, Alice Gale, and Valda Valkyrien. It is based on the play Heimat by Hermann Sudermann.

== Cast ==
- Clara Kimball Young as Magda
- Alice Gale as The Mother
- Valda Valkyrien as Marie Schwartz
- Kitty Baldwin as Franiska
- Maude George as Theresa
- Thomas Holding as Pastor
- Edward Fielding as Kellner
- George Merlo as Max

== Bibliography ==
- Donald W. McCaffrey & Christopher P. Jacobs. Guide to the Silent Years of American Cinema. Greenwood Publishing, 1999. ISBN 0-313-30345-2
