= Brennan of the Moor =

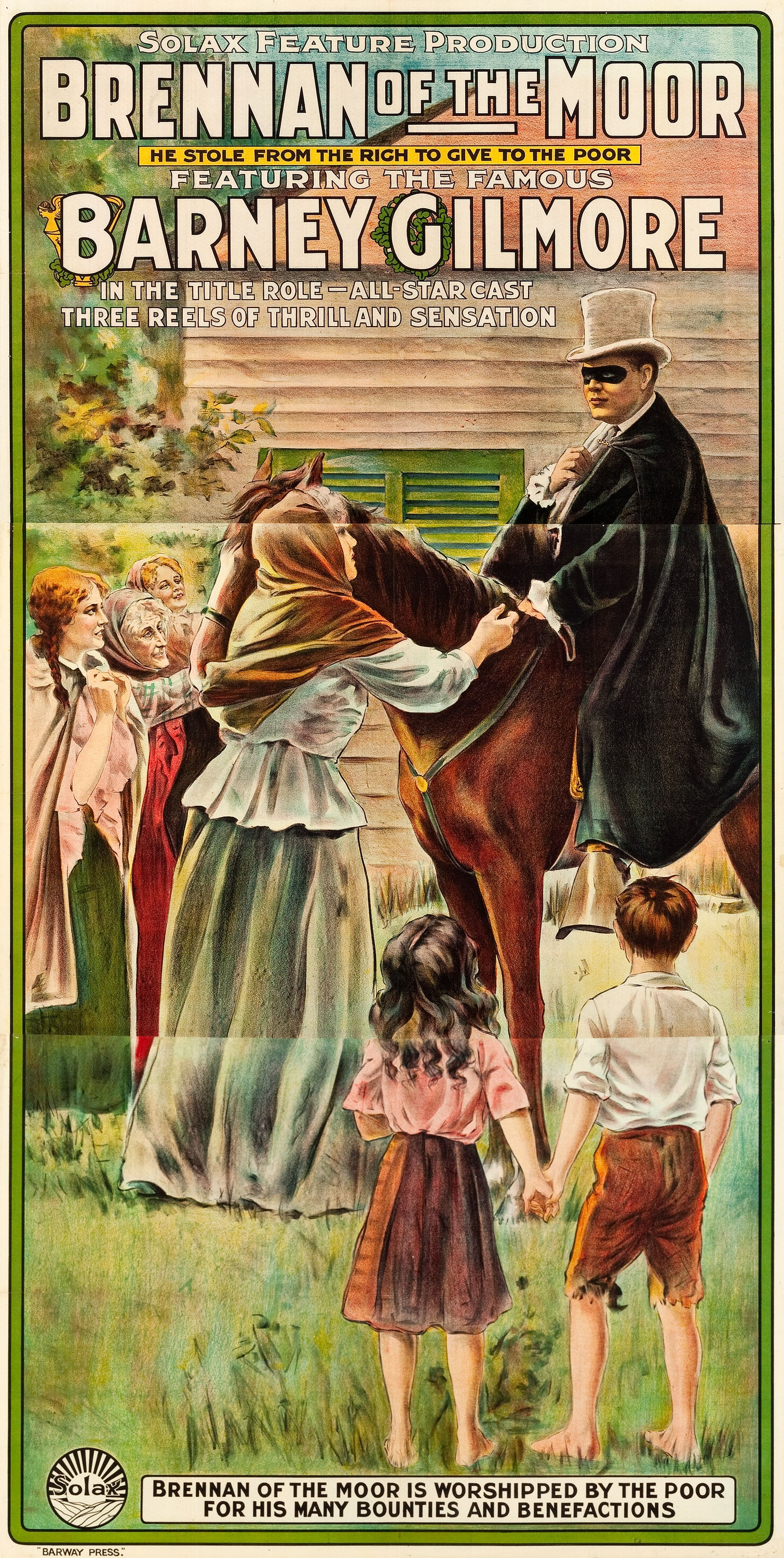
- Film poster
- Directed by: Edward Warren
- Produced by: Solax Studios
- Starring: Barney Gilmore; Marian Swayne
- Distributed by: Exclusive Supply Corporation
- Release date: August 1913
- Running time: 3 reels
- Country: United States
- Language: Silent (English intertitles)

Brennan of the Moor is a 1913 American silent short drama film on the life of the Irish highwayman Willy Brennan, directed by Edward Warren and produced by the Solax Studios. It was distributed by Exclusive Supply Corporation.

Print held by the Library of Congress.

== Cast ==
- Barney Gilmore as Brennan of the Moor
- Marian Swayne as Lady Betty
- Joseph Levering as Lt. Hume
