= Derwent Hall Caine =

British actor, publisher, politician (1891–1971)

Sir Derwent Hall Caine Bt
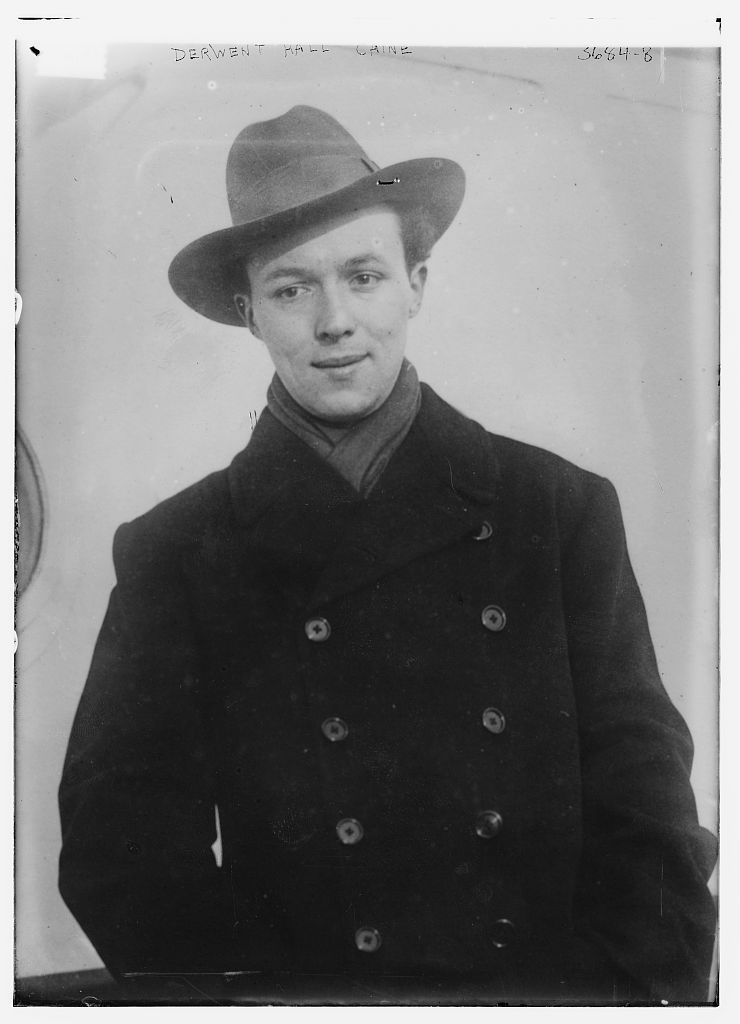
- Hall Caine, 1915

Member of Parliament for Liverpool Everton
- In office 30 May 1929 – 27 October 1931
- Preceded by: Herbert Charles Woodcock
- Succeeded by: Frank Hornby

Personal details
- Born: 12 August 1891 Keswick, Cumberland, England
- Died: 2 December 1971 (aged 80) Miami, Florida, U.S.
- Party: Labour; National Labour (after 1931)
- Children: 3
- Parents: Hall Caine (father); Mary Chandler (mother)
- Relatives: Gordon Hall Caine (brother)
- Profession: Actor, filmmaker, publisher, businessperson

Sir Derwent Hall Caine, 1st Baronet (12 September 1891 – 2 December 1971) was a British actor, publisher and Labour then National Labour politician.

== Biography ==
Caine was the younger son of British novelist Hall Caine and his wife, Mary Chandler. He was born at Keswick in Cumberland, and so derived his name from nearby Derwent Water. He was a sensitive child with asthma, and attended St Cyprian's School in Eastbourne for his health. He became an actor, making his stage debut in 1906 in his father's adaptation of his novel, The Bondman.

His father went to the United States to encourage American involvement in World War I and had dramatic interests there. In 1915, Derwent Caine sailed to America to look after those interests. Although declared unfit for active service, he was nearly prevented from travelling because of a change of rules.

In America, he starred in The Crusher (1917) with Danish actress Valda Valkyrien at the Wharton Studios in Ithaca, New York, as well as three films made by the Arrow Film Corporation. These were The Deemster (which had been written by his father), a version of Crime and Punishment by Dostoyevsky, and the propaganda film Huns Within Our Gates.

Back in England, with his brother Gordon, he founded the publishing firm named The Readers Library Publishing Company Ltd. The firm was "arguably the first in Britain to specialise in novelizations of films".

In 1929, he stood for parliament as Labour candidate for Liverpool, Everton and was returned as Member of Parliament. In January 1931, he was charged with dangerous driving after colliding with a taxi in the early hours of the morning in Trafalgar Square, injuring the four taxi passengers (an army Major in the Scots Guards, his wife and two friends). Caine was subsequently acquitted.

When the Labour government collapsed in 1931, he carried on supporting Ramsay MacDonald as a National Labour MP. Hall Caine was the only sitting National Labour MP to be opposed by the Conservatives at the 1931 general election. He lost his seat to Frank Hornby, and finished bottom of the poll. At the same election, his elder brother, Gordon, was elected Conservative member for East Dorset.

He was knighted in 1935 and made a baronet in 1937.

Caine was reportedly engaged to the racing driver and actress Paddy Naismith. He sired at least three children out of wedlock, and one of them, Elin, was adopted by Caine's parents as their own daughter in 1912. He died in Miami, Florida, aged 80.

=== Hall Caine Airport ===
In 1935, Gordon and Derwent established the Hall Caine Airport on the Isle of Man. Both were particularly keen on the development of an aerodrome in the north of the Isle of Man, as they saw it as another bit of the Island as being associated with their late father. They were said to be extremely interested in the progress of the Isle of Man and in particular its transport infrastructure. They also wished to include Ramsey's municipal authority in the project, as they were both of the opinion that the aerodrome would bring immense benefit to the town.

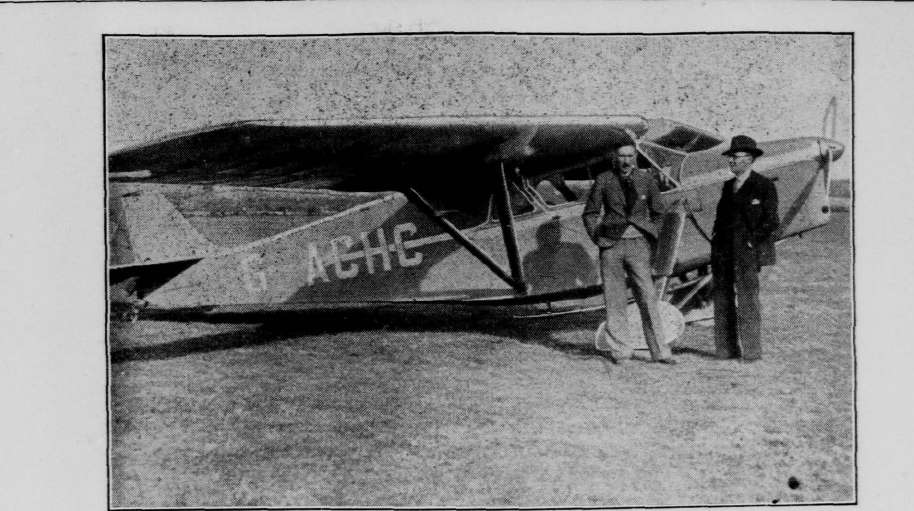
Derwent Hall Caine pictured with his Leopard Moth at Close Lake Airfield, April 1935.

Amongst the ambitious plans envisaged by Derwent Hall Caine was the inclusion of the airfield as part of an air network running the length of the country from Jersey and staging through numerous destinations including Hall Caine Airport, terminating at Campbeltown.

In an interview with the Ramsey Courier, Derwent Hall Caine stated that from the introduction of air services, the site was to be known as Hall Caine Manx Airport. This was subsequently changed to the Hall Caine Airport, Ramsey. With all parties duly satisfied, Hall Caine Airport officially came into being on 30 April 1935.

Hall Caine Airport flourished from 1935 until it ceased commercial operations in 1937.

== Filmography ==
- The Christian (1915) as John Storm
- The Deemster (1917) as Daniel Mylrea
- The Crusher (1917) as Arthur Morgan
- Crime and Punishment (1917) as Rodion Raskolnikoff
- Huns Within Our Gates (1918) as Arthur Morgan
- Darby and Joan (1920) as Patrick Gorry

Parliament of the United Kingdom
Preceded by Herbert Charles Woodcock	Member of Parliament for Liverpool, Everton; 1929 – 1931	Succeeded by Frank Hornby
Baronetage of the United Kingdom
New creation	Baronet (of Greeba Castle); 1937–1971	Extinct
