= Howell Hansel =

American film director

- Born: 1860; Indiana, USA
- Died: November 5, 1917 (aged 56–57); Manhattan, New York, USA
- Occupation(s): Actor, film director

Howell Hansel (1860 – 1917), was an American film director. He directed 26 films between 1913 and 1917.

== Biography ==
Hansel was born in Indiana, and began his career as a stage actor on the East Coast. Eventually he gave up his acting career to join Thanhauser as a film director; he'd also direct films for Famous Players–Lasky.

His output slowed toward the end of his life as he struggled with a prolonged illness. He died in Manhattan in 1917, leaving behind a wife and a daughter.

== Selected filmography ==
- The Long Trail (1917)
- The Deemster (1917)
- The Goad of Jealousy (1916) (short)
- Weighed in the Balance (1916) (short)
- The Lost Paradise (1916) (short)
- A Trial of Souls (1916) (short)
- Beyond Recall (1916) (short)
- Truth Crushed to Earth (1916) (short)
- Sold Out (1916) (short)
- The Tight Rein (1916) (short)
- Tillie's Tomato Surprise (1916)
- Horrible Hyde (1915) (short)
- Colonel Carter of Cartersville (1915)
- The Road o' Strife (1915)
- A Man of Iron (1915) (short)
- A Hatful of Trouble (1914) (short)
- Zudora (1914)
- The Million Dollar Mystery (1914)
- A Dog of Flanders (1914)
- A Woman's Loyalty (1914)
- Ben Bolt (1913)
