= Birds of Prey (1927 film) =

1927 film

- Directed by: William James Craft
- Written by: Dorothy Howell
- Produced by: Harry Cohn
- Starring: Priscilla Dean; Hugh Allan; Gustav von Seyffertitz
- Cinematography: J.O. Taylor
- Production company: Columbia Pictures
- Distributed by: Columbia Pictures
- Release date: March 20, 1927
- Running time: 56 minutes
- Country: United States
- Languages: Silent; English intertitles

Birds of Prey is a 1927 American silent drama film directed by William James Craft and starring Priscilla Dean, Hugh Allan and Gustav von Seyffertitz.

== Premise ==
Two pickpockets attempt to blackmail a banker over his former prison record. However, the female of the pair falls in love with the banker's son.

== Cast ==
- Priscilla Dean as Helen Wayne
- Hugh Allan as Hamilton Smith Jr.
- Gustav von Seyffertitz as Foxy
- Ben Hendricks Jr. as Archie Crossley
- Sidney Bracey as Gaston
- William H. Tooker as J. Hamilton Smith
- Fritz Becker as The runt

== Preservation and status ==
A complete copy of the film is held at the Cinematheque Royale de Belgique.

== Bibliography ==
- Munden, Kenneth White. The American Film Institute Catalog of Motion Pictures Produced in the United States, Part 1. University of California Press, 1997.
