= The Outsider (1917 film) =

1917 silent film directed by William C. Dowlan

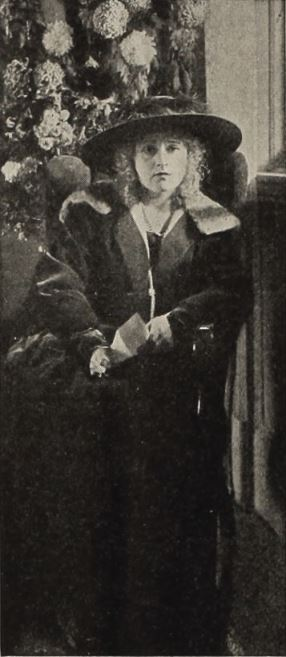
- Still with Wehlen from a magazine
- Directed by: William C. Dowlan
- Written by: Charles A. Taylor (scenario)
- Based on: the novel, Nobody by Louis Joseph Vance
- Produced by: B. A. Rolfe
- Starring: Emmy Wehlen; Herbert Heyes; Florence Short
- Cinematography: John M. Bauman
- Production company: Metro Pictures
- Release date: November 5, 1917 (U.S.)
- Running time: 6 reels
- Country: United States
- Language: Silent (English intertitles)

The Outsider is a 1917 American silent drama film directed by William C. Dowlan. It stars Emmy Wehlen, Herbert Heyes, and Florence Short, and was released on November 5, 1917.

== Cast ==
- Emmy Wehlen as Sally Manvers
- Herbert Heyes as Trego
- Florence Short as Mrs. Standish
- Virginia Palmer as Mrs. Gosnold
- Jules Raucourt as Walter Arden Savage
- Harry Benham as Donald Lyttleton
- Ilean Hume as Lucy Spode
- Gladys Fairbanks as Miss Pride

== Preservation status ==
Prints of The Outsider are held by the Museum of Modern Art (MOMA) and Cinemateket-Svenska Filminstitutet, Stockholm.
