= Modern Mothers =

1928 silent film directed by Phil Rosen

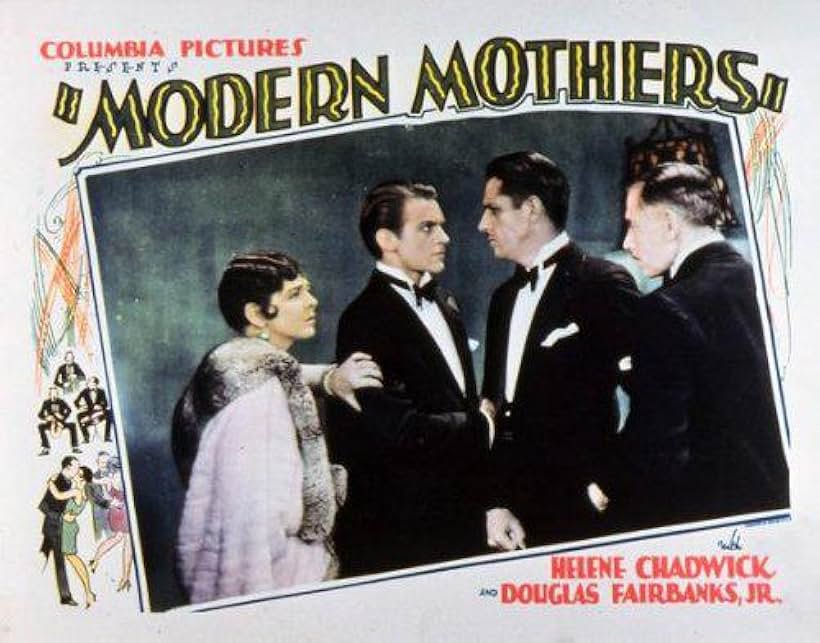
- Directed by: Phil Rosen
- Written by: Peter Milne
- Produced by: Harry Cohn
- Starring: Helene Chadwick; Douglas Fairbanks Jr. Ethel Grey Terry
- Cinematography: Joe Walker
- Edited by: [Ben Pivar
- Production company: Columbia Pictures
- Release date: May 13, 1928 (US)
- Running time: 60 minutes
- Country: United States
- Language: Silent (English intertitles)

Modern Mothers is a lost 1928 American silent drama film, directed by Phil Rosen. It stars Helene Chadwick, Douglas Fairbanks Jr., and Ethel Grey Terry, and was released on May 13, 1928.

== Cast list ==
- Helene Chadwick as Adele Dayton
- Douglas Fairbanks Jr. as David Starke
- Ethel Grey Terry as Mazie
- Barbara Kent as Mildred
- Alan Roscoe as John
- Gene Stone as Gilbert
- George Irving as Theater manager
