= Good Time Charley =

1927 film by Michael Curtiz

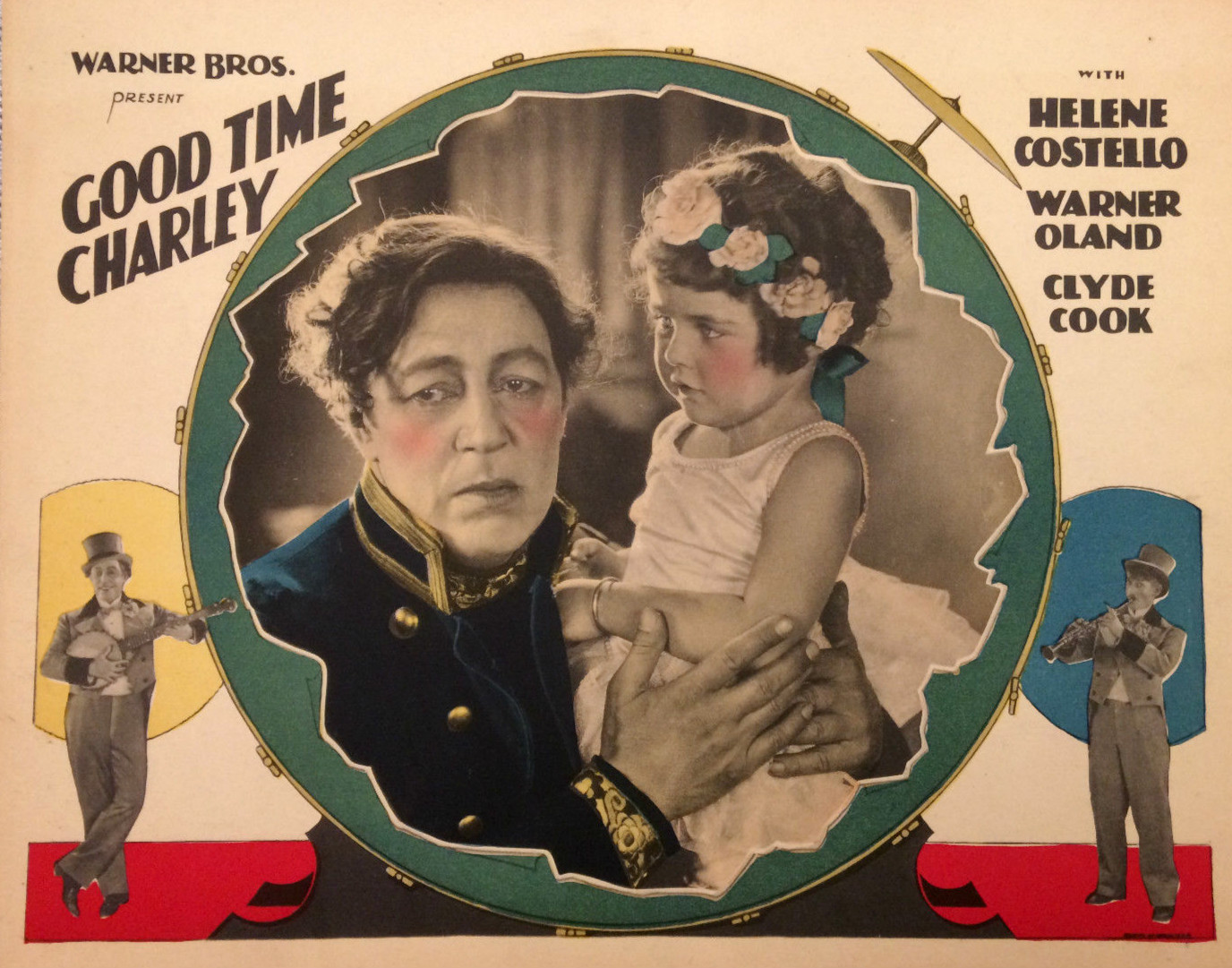
- Lobby card
- Directed by: Michael Curtiz
- Written by: Illona Fülöp (scenario); Anthony Coldeway (adaptation); Owen Francis (adaptation); Jack Jarmuth (titles)
- Story by: Daryl Zanuck
- Starring: Helene Costello; Warner Oland
- Cinematography: Barney McGill
- Production company: Warner Bros.
- Distributed by: Warner Bros.
- Release date: November 5, 1927 (U.S.)
- Running time: 70 minutes
- Country: United States
- Languages: Sound (Synchronized) (English intertitles)

Good Time Charley is a 1927 American synchronized sound drama film produced and distributed by Warner Bros. and directed by Michael Curtiz. While the film has no audible dialog, it was released with a synchronized musical score with sound effects using the Vitaphone sound-on-disc process. It was considered to be a lost film. However, as of January 2021, the film is listed as extant at the Library of Congress.

== Plot ==
Charles Edwin Keene, known as “Good Time Charley”, is a song-and-dance man of the old stock company circuit. He has a wife, Elaine, and a daughter, Rosita.

Elaine is killed by John Hartwell, who had made unwanted advances.Bill Collins, the loyal props man, suspects foul play but says nothing, fearing Charley's grief would turn deadly.

Years pass. Rosita, now a young woman, performs with her aging father in a Greenwich Village cabaret act. Faithful Bill still props the act. One night, Rosita catches the eye of Jack Hartwell, the son of John Hartwell. Jack urges his father to attend the show.

At the club, Hartwell sneers at Charley as a relic of vaudeville's past, but he grants Rosita a part in his latest revue. Overnight, she becomes New York's newest stage sensation. On her behalf, Rosita pleads for a small role for her father. Hartwell agrees but insists she pay her father's salary, never telling Charley the truth.

Rosita and Jack elope, inciting Hartwell to evict Charley from the theater and reveals that Rosita has been supporting him. Jobless, Charley's health declines and his eyesight fails. A doctor tells him that only an expensive operation can save his vision. Faithful Bill mortgages enough money..

Rosita plans to sail to Europe. Charley, still pretending to be thriving, gives her the $1,000 for the journey and hides his medical crisis. Jack plans to abandon Rosita. He puts her on the ship, makes an excuse to leave, and runs off with most of her funds.

When Bill learns that Charley gave away the life-saving money, he finally reveals that Jack is the son of the man responsible for Elaine's death. Charley attempts to kill John Hartwell but in his near-blindness, he fires at a mirror. Hartwell escapes unharmed.

Charley, believing himself a murderer, turns himself in but Hartwell lies to authorities and calls him a "harmless lunatic". Charley and Bill take refuge at The Actors’ Haven, a shelter for old stage troupers. Rosita, now a European sensation, writes often, but Charley refuses to answer her letters out of pride. Rosita returns to America, hoping to find him.

On Christmas Eve, Rosita joins a troupe of celebrated performers visiting the Haven and sees her father. They reunite, along with Bill. “Good Time Charley” and Bill take a final bow.

== Cast ==
- Helene Costello as Rosita Keene
- Warner Oland as Good Time Charley
- Clyde Cook as Bill Collins
- Montagu Love as John Hartwell
- Hugh Allan as John Hartwell Jr.
- Julanne Johnston as Elaine Keene
- Robert Dudley as Optometrist (uncredited)
- Gus Leonard as Card Player (uncredited)
- Johnnie Walker as Charles Garrick (uncredited)

== See also ==
- List of early sound feature films (1926–1929)
