= Valda Valkyrien =

American actress

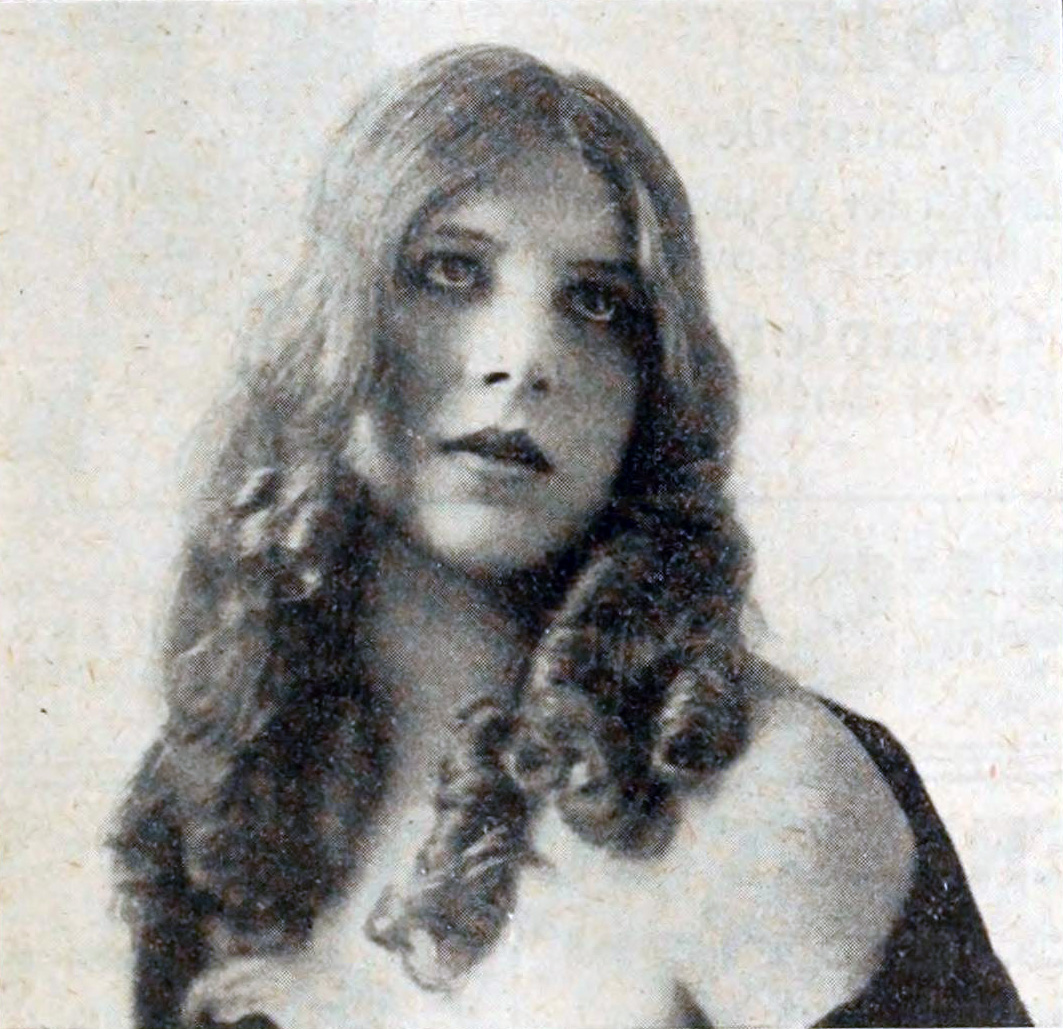
- Valda Valkyrien, c.1916
- Born: Adele Eleonore Freed; September 30, 1895; Reykjavík, Iceland
- Died: October 22, 1956 (aged 61); Los Angeles, California, U.S.
- Occupations: Actress, Ballerina
- Years active: 1912–1919
- Spouse(s): Baron Hrolf Von DeWitz (1912 - 19??); Robert Stuart Otto (19?? - 19??)

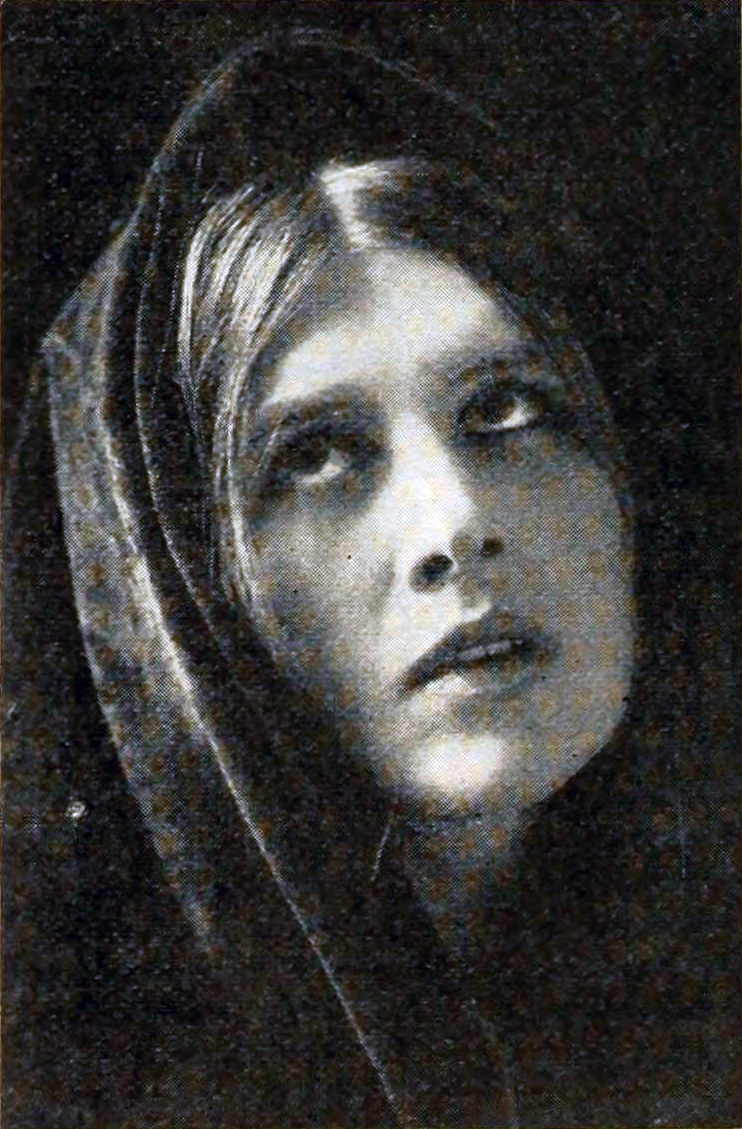
Valda Valkyrien (1916)

Valda Valkyrien (born Adele Eleonore Frede; September 30, 1895 – October 22, 1956) was a Danish silent film actress.

== Early life and career ==
Born in Reykjavík, Iceland, Valkyrien was born Adele Frede; although she may have been a student at the Royal Danish Ballet, she was neither a prima ballerina nor premiere danseuse, as she later claimed. She married Danish nobleman and author, Baron Hrolf von Dewitz, and in 1912 began appearing in motion pictures for Nordisk Film productions of Copenhagen, where she was a bit part player or, at best, a supporting cast member in at least six silent films, including one feature-length production, but not a star. Of these films at least one, Den Stærkeste (Vanquished), was released in the United States by the Great Northern Film Company, the Nordisk Film subsidiary in New York City. Gathering war clouds in Europe obliged Valkyrien and Dewitz to relocate to the United States in 1914. While the Baron found himself consumed by his work as a military expert for the New York Daily, Baroness Dewitz was left languishing “alone in a strange land,” but she apparently entered a beauty contest in 1914 where she won the title "Valkyrien". Studio owner David Horsley noticed her and signed her to make the "Baroness Film Series" for Horsley's Centaur Film Company in Bayonne, New Jersey, which were billed in trade papers as “a special brand of refined comedy”.

With World War I raging in Europe, in 1915 a New York City publisher released her husband's book titled War's New Weapons which received considerable publicity. That same year, the Thanhouser Company capitalized on her husband's success and her aristocratic title, billing her as Baroness von Dewitz in a three-reel film about Norse mythology titled The Valkyrie. She then made single films for the Vitagraph Company of America (Youth [1915]) and the little-known Pluragraph Company (Diana) in succession.

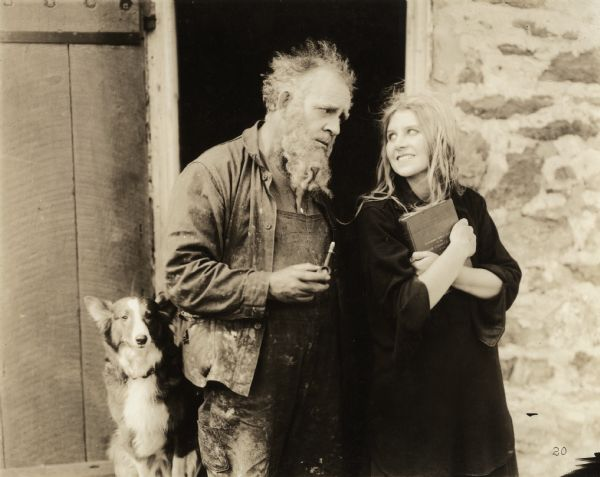
Valda Valkyrien playing a young girl, probably in the 1916 Thanhouser production "Silas Marner." If so, the older actor is Frederick Warde.

== Further film career ==
Valkyrien's success at Thanhouser brought her an offer from the Fox Film Corporation and in 1916 she signed on to make feature-length productions at Fox's East Coast facilities in New Jersey. However, the contractual relationship soured after one film, The Unwelcome Mother; she was supposed to be billed above the title, and when Fox reneged by placing her name both below the title and that of her co-star, she sued Fox for $25,000. Valkyrien then left Fox and returned to Thanhouser at New Rochelle, New York to work successfully in feature-length films during the company's last two years of production (1916–17) and then acted in single films: first in Magda (1917) with Clara Kimball Young's own company for Lewis J. Selznick's Select Pictures, then The Crusher (1917) with Derwent Hall Caine at the Wharton Studios in Ithaca, New York, T'Other Dear Charmer (1918) with John Bowers and directed by former Vitagraph director William P. S. Earle for the World Film Corporation, and the sensationalist independent production Huns Within Our Gates (1918, also starring Derwent Hall Caine), ironically filmed at the dormant Thanhouser studios for the Arrow Film Corporation.

Valkyrien's last film (and her only film shot in Los Angeles) is probably her most remembered, although she had only a secondary role. Bolshevism on Trial (1919, directed by Harley Knoles and released by Lewis Selznick) was an anti-Marxist melodrama based upon a novel by Thomas Dixon, Jr. (author of The Clansman, the source for The Birth of a Nation) about a wealthy father who purchases an island off the coast of Florida and establishes a commune for his son in order to prove to the idealistic young man that communism can't work.

It has been suggested that Valkyrien's suit against Fox might have led to the downfall of her career. Although her subsequent work for Thanhouser was well-received, it was done at a time when the company - which had always been something of a family concern under the then-rapidly-tiring Edwin Thanhouser - was declining in the film industry, most film production was shifting to the West Coast, and Valkyrien's troubles with Fox might have labeled her as a potential trouble-maker.

== Later life ==
Before they divorced in 1919, Valkyrien's marriage to Hrolf von Dewitz had produced a son, Arden von Dewitz (1915–2004), who went on to become a successful painter in southern California. She married a second time to the New York industrialist Robert Stuart Otto with whom she had another child, Jean Otto.

Valda Valkyrien moved to the West Coast where she lived until her death in Los Angeles in 1956 after a lengthy illness. She was interred in the Forest Lawn Memorial Park Cemetery in Glendale, California.

== Filmography ==
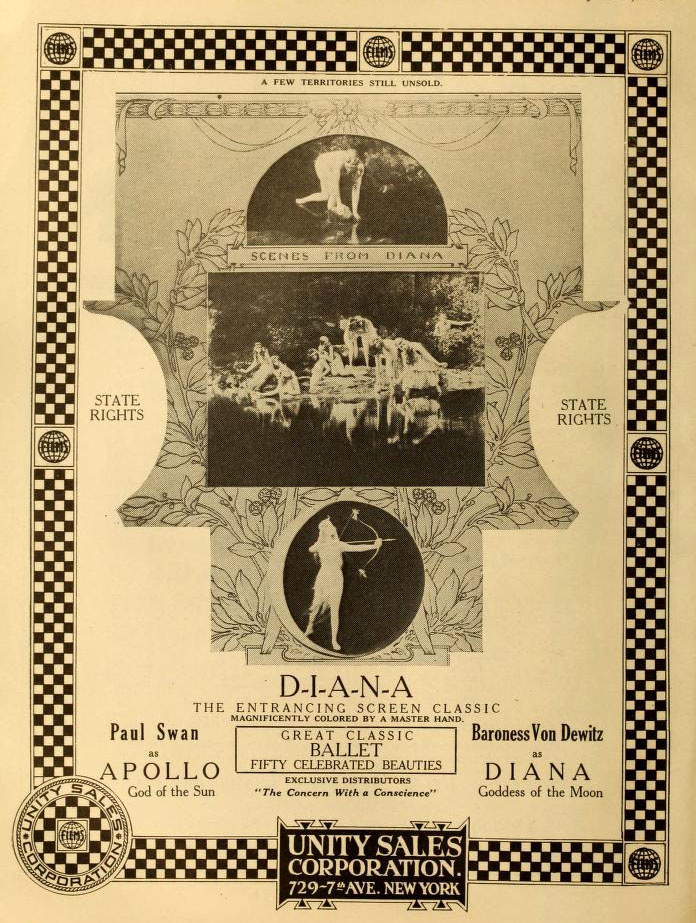
Diana (1916)

- De Uheldige friere (1912)
- En Moders kaerlighed (1912)
- Frederik Buch som skopudser (1912)
- En Staerkere magt (1912)
- Dødsspring til hest fra cirkuskuplen (1912)
- Den nye skopudser (1912)
- Den Stærkeste (Vanquished) (1912)
- Baroness Film Series (1914)
- Youth (1915)
- The Valkyrie (1915)
- Diana - The Huntress (1916)
- Silas Marner (1916)
- The Hidden Valley (1916)
- The Cruise of Fate (1916)
- The Unwelcome Mother (1916)
- Magda (1917)
- The Crusher (1917)
- The Image Maker (1917)
- Huns Within Our Gates (1918)
- T'Other Dear Charmer (1918)
- Bolshevism on Trial (1919)
