= Paddy Naismith =

English actress, pilot and racing driver

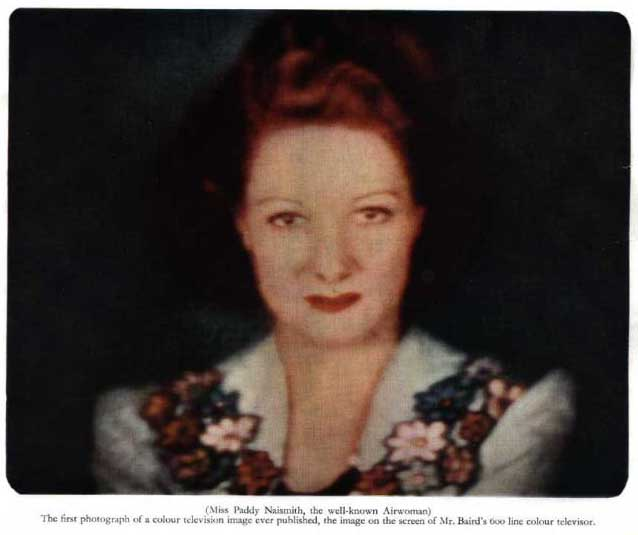
- Born: 16 May 1903
- Died: 28 November 1963 (aged 60); London, England
- Education: Italia Conti Academy of Theatre Arts
- Occupation: Actress
- Political party: Labour
- Spouse: John Towers Mynors (m. 1941)

Paddy Naismith or Eirane Redmond Naismith (16 May 1903 – 28 November 1963) was a British actress, pilot and racing driver. She appeared in an early live colour TV demonstration.

== Life ==
She was born in 1908 to parents John Naismith and Mary Francis (née Redmond) Naismith. Her father sold car tyres and her mother was a well-known clairvoyant. Her sisters, Jill and Sheila, were also actresses.

She trained at the Italia Conti Academy of Theatre Arts.

In 1928 she was working with the Welsh Person Elder Company, who were making silent films based on the novels by the English writer W. W. Jacobs, with Jacobs involved in the creation of the films. The first film made was titled The Bravo. Fifty actresses were auditioned and Jacobs was said to have been impressed by Naismith, who was chosen to play Lucy, the lead role.

Naismith became a friend of Derwent Hall Caine, who was an actor who went on to be a Member of Parliament. In 1929 they were reported to be engaged but this was later retracted. He was notorious for having a number of illegitimate children, but through him she met Ishbel MacDonald who served as hostess to her father Ramsay MacDonald, who was Prime Minister.

A live image of Naismith was used to demonstrate John Logie Baird's first all-electronic colour television system named Telechrome. In the same month she was competing with her own car in a concours.

Her first motorsport experiences were in rallies and she often drove Standard cars for these events. She entered the RAC Rally in 1932 and 1933.

She raced at Brooklands between 1931 and 1934, often in a supercharged Salmson belonging to Derwent Hall-Caine. Her debut at the track was in Barbara Cartland's 1931 "Society Ladies' Private Handicap", a pretend race held for the benefit of a film crew. All of the Society Ladies used MGs. She won a genuine Ladies' Handicap in 1933 against nine other women, including Fay Taylour and Elsie Wisdom.

In 1934, she entered the BARC First Long Handicap in July and the First Kingston Junior Long Handicap in October. She finished third in both races. The second of these was her last race at the circuit and she was fined for exceeding track limits.

In 1934 she was photographed by the Bassano company, and a photo is in the National Portrait Gallery.

== Private life ==
She married John Towers Mynors, an RAF officer, in 1941.
