= The Crusher (1917 film) =

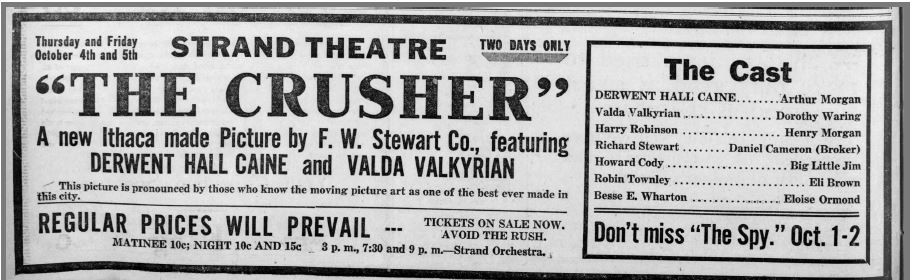
- Advert for The Crusher; Ithaca Journal Sep 28, 1917
- Directed by: John K. Holbrook
- Produced by: Leopold Wharton; Theodore Wharton
- Starring: Derwent Hall Caine; Valda Valkyrien
- Production company: F.W.Stewart Film Company
- Distributed by: The Wharton Studio
- Release date: October 4, 1917
- Running time: 5 Reels
- Country: United States
- Languages: Silent film English intertitles

The Crusher (1917) is a silent film, starring Derwent Hall Caine and Valda Valkyrien. Produced by the F. W. Stewart Co., at The Wharton Studio, under the directorship of J. K. Holbrook.

== Plot ==
Arthur Morgan, an impulsive, reckless young Southerner, has invented an engine for submarine or airship. He gets in trouble in his old home and goes to New York to perfect his invention. He falls in love with a woman who is head of a foreign spy system. Her agent steals the formula and escapes to Europe. Arthur is crushed in spirit and in desperation tries to take his own life. The story is a parallel to the operations of extracting gold from the quartz. Morgan being the quartz, and New York City the crusher, and Dorothy Waring the amalogan which collects the grain of gold from the worthless crystal and makes it of value. In the picture is shown a battle between a submarine and a great trans-Atlantic liner, in which the submarine is sunk by a shot from the liner, but before sinking torpedoes the great ship.

== Cast ==
- Derwent Hall Caine as Arthur Morgan
- Valda Valkyrien as Dorothy Waring
- Harry Robinson as Henry Morgan
- Richard Stewart as Daniel Cameron
- Howard Cody as Big Little Jim
- Robin Townley as Eli Brown
- Bessie Wharton as Eloise Ormond

== Production ==
The Crusher was started as a six-reel feature on September 10, 1917, the first film of the F.W. Stewart Company, a new film company in Ithaca, New York, managed by F.W Stewart, J.K. Holbrook and J.J. Hennessy. They used the plant of the Wharton Company at Renwick.

The location scenes were filmed in the vicinity of Ithaca, Trumansburg and New York City. The interiors were made at Wharton Studio. Many locals were used in the filming of the ballroom scene.

== Release ==
The five reel feature opened at The Strand October 4, 1917 for two days. It was described as “one of the best pictures produced in Ithaca” and that” Derwent Hall Caine is at his best as Arthur Morgan, the reckless young Southerner who invented the submarine engine”.
