= Sin Town (1929 film) =

1929 film

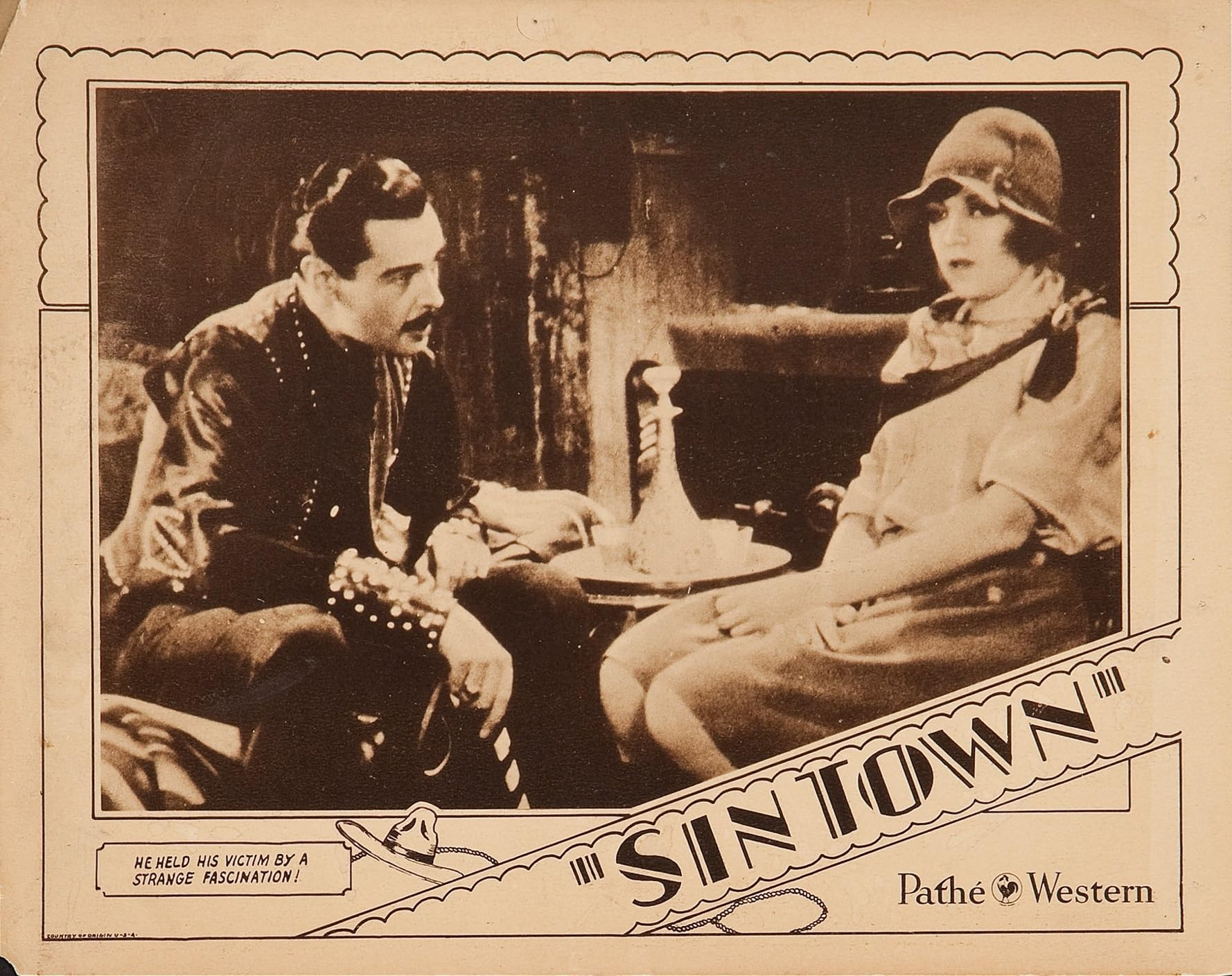
- Lobby card
- Directed by: J. Gordon Cooper; William K. Howard
- Written by: J. Gordon Cooper; William K. Howard
- Starring: Elinor Fair; Ivan Lebedeff; Hugh Allan; Jack Oakie
- Cinematography: Harold Stein
- Production company: DeMille Pictures Corporation
- Distributed by: Pathé Exchange
- Release date: January 20, 1929
- Country: United States
- Languages: Silent; English intertitles

Sin Town is a 1929 American silent Western film directed by J. Gordon Cooper and William K. Howard and starring Elinor Fair, Ivan Lebedeff and Hugh Allan. It is a contemporary-set Western, in which two World War I veterans are wrongly accused of killing a rancher and arrested for murder. With the help of the rancher's daughter they escape and capture the real culprit.

== Plot ==
"Silk" Merrick and "Chicken" O'Toole are two World War I veterans who head West. The two friends find themselves accused of murdering a local rancher. Merrick escapes from jail and helps another rancher burn down Sin Town. Merrick frees O'Toole from jail, captures the real murderer, and the two of them settle down with Mary Barton, the murdered rancher's daughter.

== Cast ==
- Elinor Fair as Mary Barton
- Ivan Lebedeff as Pete Laguerro
- Hugh Allan as "Silk" Merrick
- Jack Oakie as "Chicken" O'Toole
- Bob Perry as "Slippery" Simpson

== Production ==
In the scenes of burning Sin Town, the buildings that were burned were part of the Harold Lloyd studios, which was being cleared to make room for University of California, Los Angeles (UCLA).
