= The Little Samaritan =

- Directed by: Joseph Levering
- Written by: Clarence J. Harris
- Produced by: Ludwig G.B. Erb
- Starring: Marian Swayne; Carl Gerard; Lucile Dorrington
- Production company: Erbograph Company
- Distributed by: Art Dramas
- Release date: August 27, 1917
- Running time: 50 minutes
- Country: United States
- Languages: Silent; English intertitles

The Little Samaritan is a 1917 American silent drama film directed by Joseph Levering and starring Marian Swayne, Carl Gerard and Lucile Dorrington.

== Cast ==
- Marian Swayne as Lindy Gray
- Carl Gerard as Reverend
- Sam Robinson as Noah
- Lucile Dorrington

== Bibliography ==
- Hans J. Wollstein. Strangers in Hollywood: the History of Scandinavian Actors in American Films from 1910 to World War II. Scarecrow Press, 1994.
