= Little Miss Fortune =

- Directed by: Joseph Levering
- Written by: Clarence J. Harris
- Produced by: Ludwig G.B. Erb
- Starring: Marian Swayne; Lucile Dorrington; Hugh Thompson; Anna Day-Perry
- Cinematography: James Robertson
- Production company: Erbograph Company
- Distributed by: Art Dramas
- Release date: May 10, 1917
- Running time: 50 minutes
- Country: United States
- Languages: Silent; English intertitles

Little Miss Fortune is a 1917 American silent comedy drama film directed by Joseph Levering and starring Marian Swayne, Lucile Dorrington and Hugh Thompson.

== Cast ==
- Marian Swayne as Sis
- Lucile Dorrington as Flossie
- Hugh Thompson as Jim
- Bradley Barker as Ned
- Anna Day-Perry

== Bibliography ==
- Robert B. Connelly. The Silents: Silent Feature Films, 1910-36, Volume 40, Issue 2. December Press, 1998.
