= The Road Between =

- Directed by: Joseph Levering
- Written by: J. Fred Sanford
- Produced by: Ludwig G.B. Erb
- Starring: Marian Swayne; Bradley Barker; Armand Cortes
- Cinematography: James Robertson
- Production company: Erbograph Company
- Distributed by: Art Dramas
- Release date: June 25, 1917
- Running time: 50 minutes
- Country: United States
- Languages: Silent; English intertitles

The Road Between is a 1917 American silent drama film directed by Joseph Levering and starring Marian Swayne, Bradley Barker and Armand Cortes.

== Cast ==
- Marian Swayne as Polly Abbott
- Bradley Barker as Davey
- Armand Cortes as Al Dayton
- Gladys Fairbanks as Sarah Abbott
- Frank Andrews as Martin Abbott
- Kirke Brown as J. Foster Dobbs
- Sallie Tyscher as Flo

== Bibliography ==
- Langman, Larry. American Film Cycles: The Silent Era. Greenwood Publishing, 1998.
