= Wild Beauty (1927 film) =

1927 film

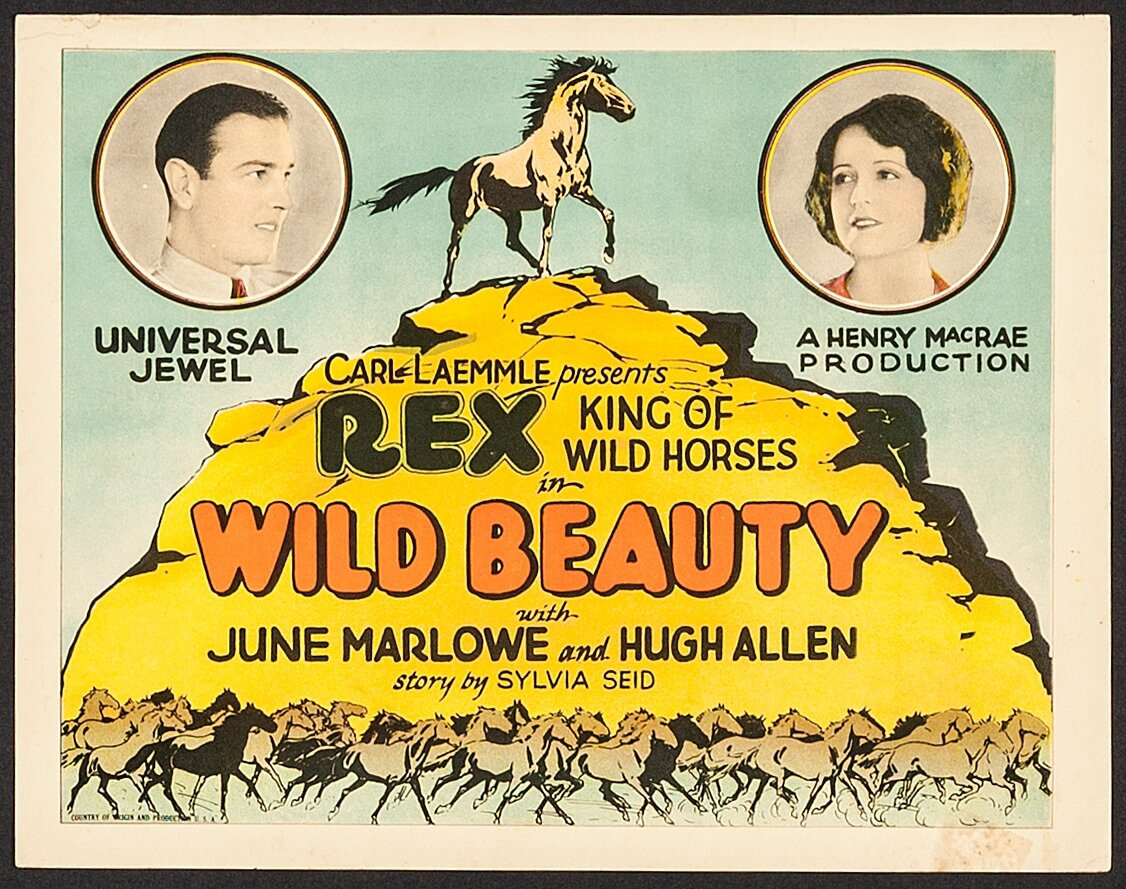
- Lobby card
- Directed by: Henry MacRae
- Written by: Sylvia Bernstein; Edward J. Meagher; Tom Reed
- Produced by: Carl Laemmle
- Starring: Hugh Allan; June Marlowe; Scott Seaton
- Cinematography: John Stumar
- Production company: Universal Pictures
- Distributed by: Universal Pictures
- Release date: November 27, 1927
- Running time: 65 minutes
- Country: United States
- Language: Silent (Englishintertitles)

Wild Beauty is a 1927 American silent Western film directed by Henry MacRae and starring Hugh Allan, June Marlowe, and Scott Seaton.Prints exist in a private film collection and in the Library of Congress film archive.

== Plot ==
As described in a film magazine, Bill Moran, a young American soldier, brings Valerie, a young filly he had saved from shell fire, to his California ranch after the war. He falls in love with Helen Cunningham whose father maintains a famous racing stable. Colonel Cunningham is in financial difficulty but hopes to retrieve his fortunes by having his horse, Starlight, win the Steeplechase. Jim Kennedy, hearing of the wild horse Thunderhoof, plans to capture and use him to defeat the Colonel. He tricks the Colonel into making a heavy bet on the race and then has his men capture the wild horse. However, the horse escapes and Thunderhoof tries to lure Valerie away. Starlight objects and, after a fierce fight, is incapacitated by Thunderhoof. Kennedy recaptures Thunderhoof and Bill rides Valerie against him as the Cunningham entry. The race begins, and Thunderhoof throws off his rider and escapes. Valerie wins the race and Bill gains the affections of Helen. Winning his bet, the Colonel pays off his mortgage.

== Cast ==
- Rex as Thunderhoof
- Hugh Allan as Bill Moran
- June Marlowe as Helen Cunningham
- Scott Seaton as Colonel Cunningham
- Hayes E. Robertson as Washington, a stableman
- William Bailey as Jim Kennedy
- Jack Pratt as Davis
- J. Gordon Russell

== Bibliography ==
- Pitts, Michael R. Western Movies: A Guide to 5,105 Feature Films. McFarland, 2012.
