= Madame a des envies =

1906 French silent short film

Madame's cravings
- French: Madame a des envies
- Directed by: Alice Guy-Blaché
- Production company: Gaumont
- Distributed by: Gaumont
- Release date: 1906
- Running time: 5 minutes
- Country: France

Madame's cravings (French: Madame a des envies) is a 1906 French silent short film produced by Gaumont and directed by Alice Guy-Blaché.

== Plot summary ==
Madame a des envies (1906)

The film features a pregnant woman who experiencing cravings related to her pregnancy. We see her, in wide shots, stealing things she wants to swallow and, in close-ups, the heroine inserting objects into her mouth: the lollipop she stole from a little girl, the glass of absinthe she swallows, the fillet of herring she smells and eats, and finally a pipe she smokes while choking and pulling on it as if she can't help herself. Each of these close-ups her facial expression indicates pleasure on her face, as if this oral pleasure fulfills her perfectly.

== Production and release ==
The film, directed by Alice Guy-Blaché and produced by Gaumont, was released in 1906.

== Analysis ==
The film is composed of five scenes, comprising 15 shots, linked by continuity editing. Each of the scenes combines full shots with a medium close-up of the woman, played by Alice Guy, taking into her mouth and enjoying what she has just stolen.

Richard Abel notes that this film shows "an early dramatic use of the close-up", and Alison McMahan conjectures that it may be the fact that Alice Guy had used medium close-ups in her "phonoscènes" (forerunners of sound film) that led her to such use of the close-up in this film.

Iris Brey qualifies this film as the "first female gaze film". She notes that the use of close-ups "underlines and creates the emotion felt by the heroine. [...] Madame a des envies marks the beginning of an aesthetic that focuses on the sharing of an experience: desire."

This film remains in her eyes Guy's "most provocative film because it bases its plot on the sexual desires of a pregnant woman, which - still today - remains more than taboo. Alice Guy understands that she must twist the body and the camera to capture this female desire. She explores the filmic form to reach her goal: that the spectators feel the pleasure of the pregnant woman. She is therefore the first to use the close-up to intensify the drama of the scene."

The film ends with the heroine finding a baby in a cabbage patch, a reference to her first film, La Fée aux Choux, which, as stressed by Iris Brey, shows the continuation of Guy's will "to tell stories related to the female condition and the construction of the female gender."

Karen Ward Mahar says that "the focus of this film is a woman who is satisfying her own desire, not unconsciously providing visual pleasure for men in the audience as was true for so many early peep-show-style films." She concludes that "for Americans reformers, such a film would undoubtedly underscore the moral depravity of moving pictures, and of French films in general."
