= Alice (2026 TV series) =

Upcoming historial drama series

- Also known as: Alice: Pioneer of Cinema
- Genre: Biographical drama
- Created by: Claire Lemaréchal; Tim Loane
- Written by: Claire Lemaréchal; Tim Loane; André Gulluni
- Directed by: Virginie Verrier; Guillaume Lonergan
- Starring: Bérénice Bejo
- Music by: Guillaume Ferran
- Countries of origin: France; Canada; Belgium
- Original languages: French; English
- No. of episodes: 6

Production
- Production companies: HBO Max; France Télévisions; Wild Bunch; Palermo Production; Panache Productions; La Compagnie Cinématographique; Sphere Media

Original release
- Network: HBO Max; France Télévision; Crave

Alice or Alice: Pioneer of Cinema is a 2026 historical drama miniseries about the journey of the world's first female filmmaker, created by Claire Lemaréchal and Tim Loane. Virginie Verrier and Guillaume Lonergan served as directors. The series is a co-production between France, Belgium and Quebec will be available on HBO Max, France Télévisions, and Crave. It premiered at the Toronto International Film Festival 2026 in the Primetime section.

== Plot ==
The series chronicles the life and career of French filmmaker Alice Guy-Blaché, spanning her time in France and her subsequent relocation to the United States. It portrays her roles as a pioneer in early cinema, an entrepreneur, and an independent director, while exploring her personal life, marriage, and professional challenges within the developing film industry. It delves into her struggles, her thwarted loves, and her quest for freedom and recognition.

== Cast ==
- Bérénice Bejo as Alice Guy-Blaché
- Thibaut Evrard as Léon Gaumont
- Oscar Lesage as Herbert Blaché
- François Arnaud as Mitchell
- Félix Vannoorenberghe : Anatole Thiberville
- Yannick Choirat as Charles Pathé
- Irène Jacob as Marie
- Sophie Nélisse as Catherine Calvert
- Vincent Leclerc as Garvey
- Marc Barbé as Gustave Eiffel
- Steve Driesen as René Decaux

== Production ==
The 6 episodes miniseries is co-produced by HBO Max and France Télévisions, with Wild Bunch, Palermo Production, Panache Productions & La Compagnie Cinématographique (Belgium) and Sphere Media (Canada).

Filming began between September and December 2025 in Paris and across Belgium and Canada.

== Release ==
Alice is set to debut on HBO Max from 4 December 2026, with the first three episodes, followed by the final three episodes on 11 December, before its premiere on France Télévisions in 2027. The series will also premiere on Crave in Canada, and Movistar Plus+ in Spain. SND, who is a part of French media group M6, is handling its worldwide distribution.
