= Anne Terrier Laffaille =

French composer

Anne Terrier Laffaille (22 July 1904 – 22 December 1971) was a French composer and founding member of Groupe Melos.

Terrier Laffaille was born in Laval. She studied music with Vincent d'Indy at the Schola Cantorum de Paris. In 1950, Terrier Laffaille joined Robert Caby and Marcel Despard to form Groupe Melos. The group adopted Erik Satie's motto "our music is guaranteed playable." Its manifesto stated "enough intellectual esthetics, enough scholarly [pedanticism], down with modern music, down with music for technique's sake, long live music for the people!" Supported by composers Francis Poulenc and Henri Sauguet, Groupe Melos presented one concert, then faded away.

Terrier Laffaille's music was published by Charles Mayol, Éditions Alphonse Leduc, and Gauthier. Her compositions include:

== Orchestra ==
- Prelude pour la Mort de la Terre

== Piano ==
- Derniers Murmures du Soir
- Et Comment (polka-march)
- Italie en Deuil
- Marche des Insoouciants
- Menuet Bleu
- Mogador (march)
- Sonata

== Vocal ==
- "C'est la Femme"
- "Ca r'vient Cher"
- "Comprendre"
- "Convoi"
- "Filial Amour"
- "Je suis Marcheuse"
- "Ou Donc Tu Vas?"
- "Tres Content!"
