= Fraunie Fraunholz =

Canadian actor

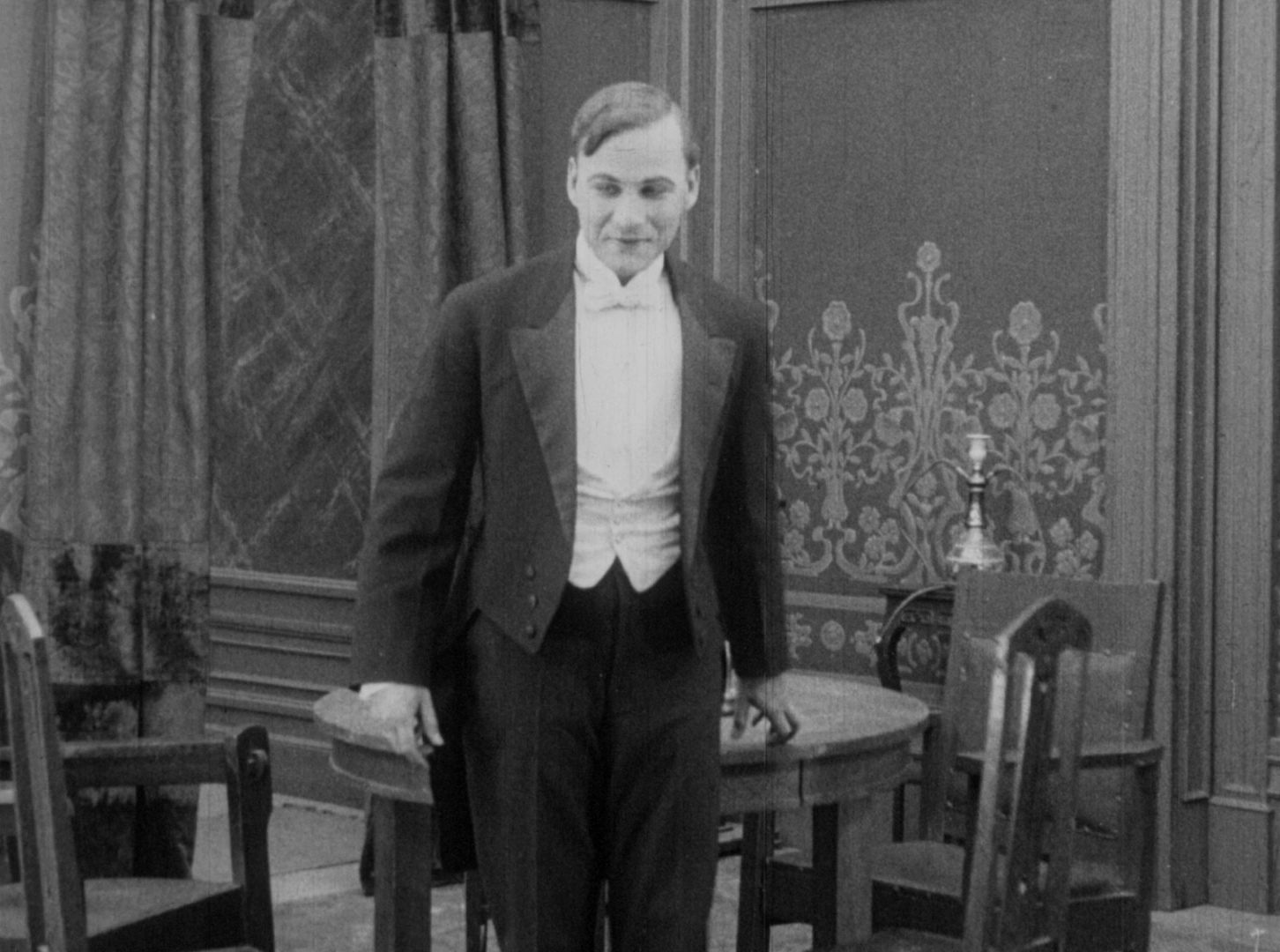
- Born: December 30, 1876; Alberta, Canada
- Died: March 2, 1938 (aged 61); California, United States
- Occupation: Actor
- Years active: 1912–1919 (film)

Fraunie Fraunholz (1876–1938) was a Canadian film actor active during the silent era. He starred in a number of films directed by the pioneer Alice Guy.

== Selected filmography ==
- Matrimony's Speed Limit (1913)
- The Pit and the Pendulum (1913)
- A House Divided (1913)
- Shadows of the Moulin Rouge (1913)
- The Lure (1914)
- The Temptations of Satan (1914)
- Her Own Way (1915)
- The Soul Market (1916)
- What Will People Say? (1916)
- The Thirteenth Chair (1919)

== Bibliography ==
- Alison McMahan. Alice Guy Blaché: Lost Visionary of the Cinema. Bloomsbury Publishing, 2014.
