= Making an American Citizen =

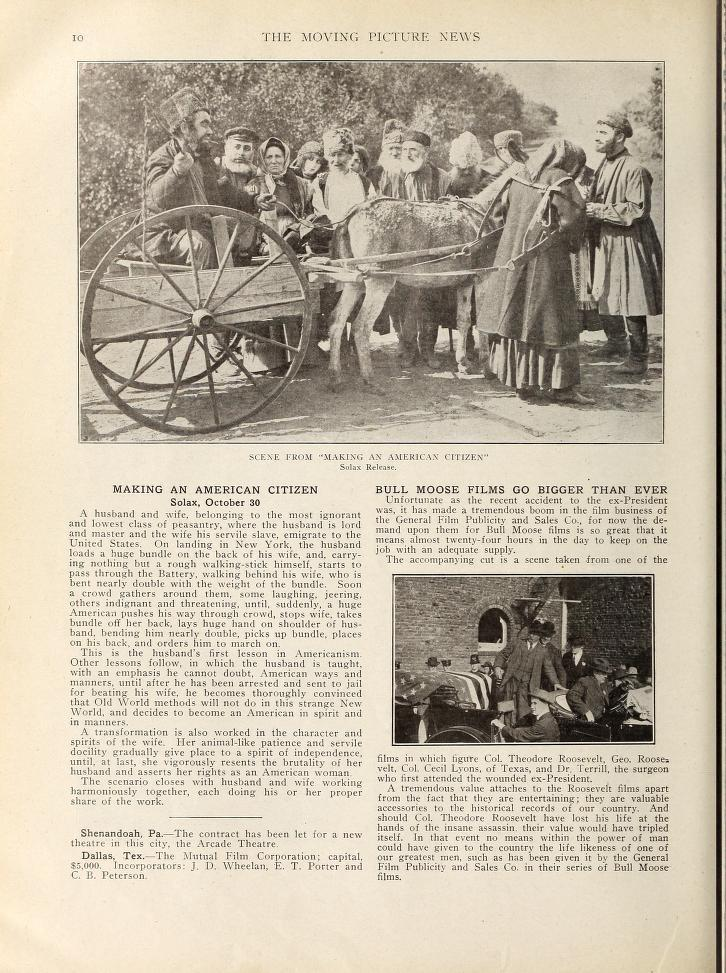
- Promotion of Making an American Citizen in Moving Picture News, October 19, 1912
- Directed by: Alice Guy-Blaché
- Produced by: Alice Guy-Blaché
- Starring: Blanche Cornwall, Lee Beggs
- Production company: Solax Studios
- Release date: October 30, 1912
- Running time: 16 min
- Country: United States
- Language: Silent

Making an American Citizen is a 1912 silent comedy short film by the pioneering French woman filmmaker Alice Guy-Blaché, produced at Solax Studios. Originally advertised as "educational drama" or "educational subject," it grapples with the theme of immigration, assimilation, and of becoming a "good American." The film carries an explicit feminist message: the lopsided power dynamics in an immigrant couple becomes increasingly equalized, as the couple spends more time in America. The wife learns to stand up to her husband's abuses, while the husband is repeatedly coerced by other American citizens into treating his wife as his equal, until he is able to internalize the ethos of the Progressive Era. The film works to allay anxieties over Eastern European immigrant men bringing "Old World" patriarchal values and practices to the "New World."

== Plot ==
Making an American Citizen (1912)

Ivan Orloff (Lee Beggs) and his unnamed wife (Blanche Cornwall) are poor peasants, presumably living in the Russian Empire. Ivan is shown sitting on a cart while his wife walks alongside their horse, helping to pull the cart. The husband whips both the horse and his wife indiscriminately. The wife is represented as completely subordinated, as just another beast. On their way, they meet a group of emigrants who invite Ivan to join them. When Ivan, together with his wife, arrives in America, "the land of freedom," he learns four "lesson[s] in Americanism" that turn him into a respectful husband with regard to his wife.

The first lesson takes place upon landing. Ivan has his wife carry a huge bundle on her back. When she succumbs under the weight of the bundle, Ivan starts prodding her with a stick, threatening to beat her. A gentleman approaches them, picks up the bundle and puts it on Ivan's back. The gentleman takes the stick from Ivan, hands it to the wife and shows her how to prod Ivan.

The second "lesson in Americanism" takes place in the couple's new home at Odessa Inn. Threatening his wife, Ivan asks her to take off his shoes. He beats her and knocks her to the floor. A man comes in and asks Ivan to put the wife in bed. After Ivan reluctantly does that, the man knocks him down to the floor the way Ivan did to his wife.

The third lesson takes place in the countryside. The couple no longer lives at the inn but owns a house and some land. The wife no longer wears a scarf. She toils in the garden, while Ivan sits in a chair smoking a pipe. When she protests, Ivan goes to beat her, but a passer-by stops him and punches him several times, forcing him to tend to his wife who has fainted and work instead of her.

Ivan's wife begins to live in an increasingly "American way." She learns to stand up to his abuse. They have another feud, this time while having dinner in their house. While they are scuffling with each other, two men come in and break them up. For Ivan's fourth and final "lesson in Americanism," he gets sentenced to hard labor for six months. In prison, he cracks and becomes "completely Americanized." The ending shows Ivan in the garden and his wife calling him for dinner. As they sit down to the table, they both seem happy and equal.
