= A House Divided (1913 film) =

- Directed by: Alice Guy
- Produced by: Alice Guy
- Production company: Solax Film Company
- Release date: May 2, 1913 (USA)
- Running time: 13 min

A House Divided is a 1913 American comedy short silent black and white film directed and produced by Alice Guy.

It was released in January 1985 by Channel 4 Television, devoted to the work of woman directors; and on 29 March 2019 at Diputación de Málaga for the International Women's Day.

== Plot ==
A House Divided (1913)

A husband and wife each come to suspect mistakenly that the other has been unfaithful. Following a lawyer's advice, they agree to continue to live in the same house but without speaking to each other. Eventually, the situation becomes unworkable and the couple reconcile.

== Cast ==
- Fraunie Fraunholz as Gerald Hutton
- Marian Swayne as Diana Hutton

== Reception ==
The Moving Picture World gave the film a brief review, concluding that the film "will make some fun in some houses". The publication also summarized the plot prior to its release. Similarly, the plot was detailed by Moving Picture News in April, 1913.
