= La valse de l'adieu =

La valse de l'adieu may refer to:

- Waltz in A-flat major, Op. 69, No. 1 by Frédéric Chopin
- The Farewell Waltz (1928 film), a 1928 French film by Henry Roussel
