= Shadows of the Moulin Rouge =

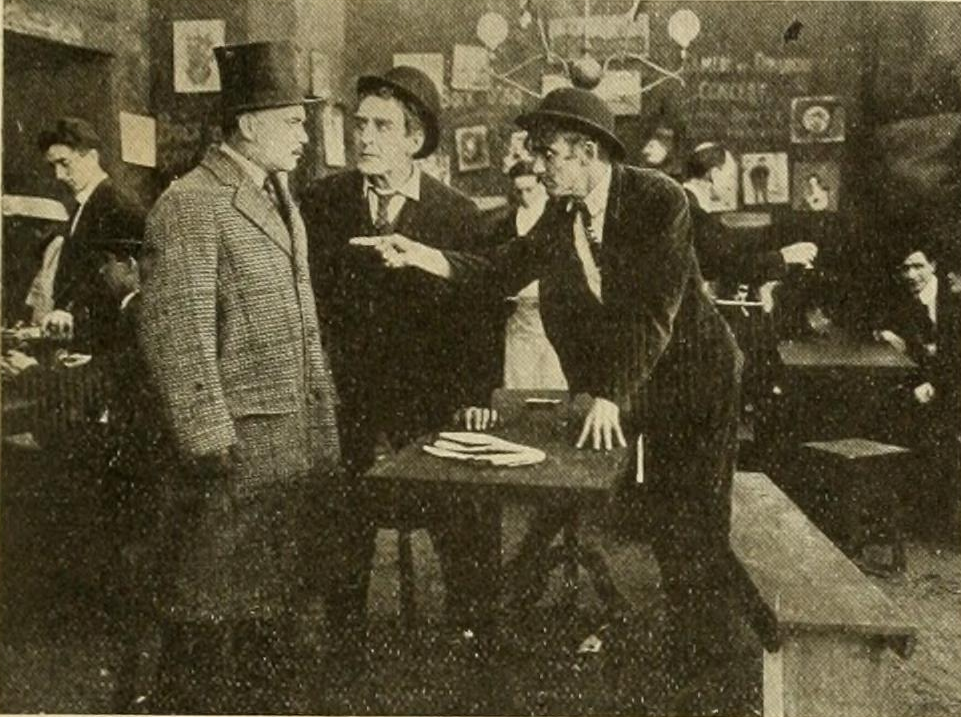
- Directed by: Alice Guy
- Written by: Alice Guy
- Produced by: Alice Guy
- Starring: Fraunie Fraunholz; Claire Whitney; Joseph Levering
- Production company: Solax Film Company
- Distributed by: Box Office Attractions Company
- Release dates: December 26, 1913; February 25, 1914 (full release)
- Running time: 4 reels
- Country: United States
- Languages: Silent; English intertitles

Shadows of the Moulin Rouge is a lost 1913 American silent drama film directed by Alice Guy and starring Fraunie Fraunholz, Claire Whitney and Joseph Levering. It was produced by Solax Studios at Fort Lee, then picked up for release by William Fox's Box Office Attractions, a forerunner of Fox Film.

== Cast ==
- Fraunie Fraunholz as Dr. Chevrele
- Claire Whitney as Mrs. Dupont
- Joseph Levering as Mr. Dupont
- John Scott
- George Paxton

== Preservation ==
With no holdings located in archives, Shadows of the Moulin Rouge is considered a lost film.

== Bibliography ==
- St. Pierre, Paul Matthew. E.A. Dupont and his Contribution to British Film: Varieté, Moulin Rouge, Piccadilly, Atlantic, Two Worlds, Cape Forlorn. Fairleigh Dickinson University Press, 2010.
