= The Pawnshop (1910 film) =

- Directed by: Alice Guy-Blaché
- Production company: Solax Company
- Release date: December 23, 1910
- Country: United States
- Language: Silent

The Pawnshop is a 1910 American silent film directed by Alice Guy-Blaché and produced by the Solax Company. Released on December 23, 1910, the film depicts a young Italian organ grinder named Tony who becomes a gambler and, after losing his money, attempts to pawn his organ and his monkey Joco. When the pawnbroker refuses them, Tony's sweetheart Marietta remains at the pawnshop as security for a $100 loan..

== Plot ==
Tony is a young Italian organ grinder who supports his mother and his sweetheart Marietta, whom he hopes to marry, with the money he earns accompanied by his monkey Joco. One day he encounters an old friend who appears to have become prosperous. When Tony asks how he acquired his money, the man explains that he has become a gambler. Hoping to achieve similar success, Tony decides to try gambling himself.

He takes the family's modest savings and initially succeeds, returning home with a large amount of money. Tony continues gambling, however, and eventually loses everything. His mother reproaches him, while Marietta comforts him and reminds him that he can still earn a living with his organ and Joco.

Instead, Tony decides to pawn his organ and Joco in order to obtain enough money to gamble again. Accompanied by Marietta, he goes to a pawnshop, but the pawnbroker refuses to accept the organ and monkey as security. Marietta pleads with him, and the pawnbroker agrees to lend Tony $100 on condition that Marietta remain as the pledge. She stays at the pawnshop, where she performs housework for the pawnbroker and his mother until Tony can repay the loan.

Tony returns to gambling and loses the money again. He resumes working in the streets with Joco, hoping to earn enough to secure Marietta's release, but his earnings are insufficient.

While leaning against a fence, Tony overhears two men from the gambling den discussing plans for a burglary. He follows them and, with Joco's assistance, succeeds in frustrating the robbery. As a reward, Tony receives $100. He immediately returns to the pawnshop, repays the loan and is reunited with Marietta.

== Production and release ==
The Pawnshop was produced by the Solax Company and directed by Alice Guy-Blaché.

Solax advertised the film in the December 10, 1910, issue of The Moving Picture World, announcing its release for Friday, December 23. The advertisement described Tony as an honest organ grinder who becomes possessed by the gambling spirit and emphasized the importance of his monkey Joco, which it described as taking a leading part in the story.

== Reception ==
A review published in The Moving Picture World singles out Joco's performance, predicting that the monkey's acting would be one of the film's most attractive features. It also regarded the idea of pawning a young woman as novel and praised the film's natural action and the convincing manner in which the story was told.
