= Félix Mayol =

French singer and entertainer (1872–1941)

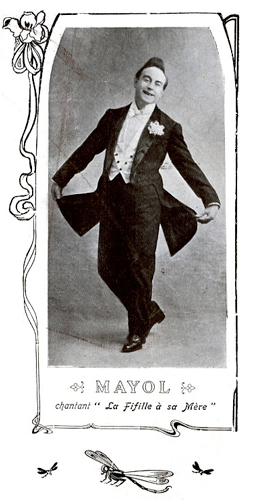
Mayol sporting his trademark quiff.

Félix Mayol (18 November 1872 – 26 October 1941) was a French singer and entertainer.

== Career ==
Mayol was born in Toulon, France. His parents, amateur singers and actors, arranged for Felix to make his debut stage at six years of age. In 1895, he went to the Montparnasse Quarter of Paris where he began a career in entertainment that spanned more than forty years. He adopted a campy effeminate manner on stage as part of his theatrical persona.

He sang the famous song "Viens poupoule, viens poupoule, viens...", and performed many songs by Théodore Botrel.

A phonoscène of Mayol's "Questions indiscrètes"

In the early years of the 20th century some of Mayol's performances were captured on the Gaumont Chronophone sound film system. He would first record his voice, then the motion picture camera would film him as he lip-synced to the record. Several of his Phonoscènes exist.

== Other activities ==
The teenaged Maurice Chevalier took a risk by impersonating Mayol in small-time cafe entertainments, Mayol reportedly recognised the young man's talent and gave him his blessing, which led Chevalier to the Casino de Paris and the Folies Bergère.

Shortly after World War I, he purchased a plot of land in Toulon and donated it to the local sports club, RC Toulonnais, for the building of a stadium. The facility, named Stade Mayol in his honor, remains in use today (after several renovations) as the home ground for the Toulon rugby team.

== Personal life ==
Mayol never married, and many stories circulated of his homosexual liaisons, including an attempt to seduce Chevalier. His brother, Charles Mayol, founded a music publishing company to print his works.

== Selected filmography ==
- To the Polls, Citizens (1932)
- La dame de chez Maxim's (1933)
