= Narrative film =

Tells a fictional or fictionalized story, event or narrative

Narrative film, fictional film or fiction film is a motion picture that tells a fictional or fictionalized story, event or narrative. Commercial narrative films with running times of over an hour are often referred to as feature films, or feature-length films. The earliest narrative films, around the turn of the 20th century, were essentially filmed stage plays and for the first three or four decades these commercial productions drew heavily upon the centuries-old theatrical tradition.

In this style of film, believable narratives and characters help convince the audience that the unfolding fiction is real. Lighting and camera movement, among other cinematic elements, have become increasingly important in these films. Great detail goes into the screenplays of narratives, as these films rarely deviate from the predetermined behaviours and lines of the classical style of screenplay writing to maintain a sense of realism. Actors must deliver dialogue and action in a believable way, so as to persuade the audience that the film is real life.

== General ==
Probably the first fictional film ever made was the Lumières' The Waterer Watered (L'Arroseur Arrosé), which was first screened at the Grand Café Capucines on December 28, 1895. A year later in 1896, Alice Guy-Blaché directed the fictional film The Fairy of the Cabbages (La Fée aux Choux). Perhaps the best known of early fictional films is Georges Méliès’s A Trip to the Moon from 1902. Most films previous to this had been merely moving images of everyday occurrences, such as The Arrival of a Train at The City Station (L'Arrivée d'un train en gare de La Ciotat) by Auguste and Louis Lumière. Méliès was one of the first directors to progress cinematic technology, which paved the way for narratives as style of film. Narrative films have come so far since their introduction that film genres such as comedy or Western films, were, and continue to be introduced as a way to further categorize these films.

Narrative cinema is usually contrasted to films that present information, such as a nature documentary, as well as to some experimental films (works such as Wavelength by Michael Snow, Man with a Movie Camera by Dziga Vertov, or films by Chantal Akerman). In some instances pure documentary films, while nonfiction, may nonetheless recount a story. As genres evolve, from fiction film and documentary a hybrid one emerged, docufiction.

Many films are based on real occurrences, however these too fall under the category of a "narrative film" rather than a documentary. This is because films based on real occurrences are not simply footage of the occurrence, but rather hired actors portraying an adjusted, often more dramatic, retelling of the occurrence (such as 21 by Robert Luketic).

Unlike literary fiction, which is typically based on characters, situations and events that are entirely imaginary/fictional/hypothetical, cinema always has a real referent, called the "pro-filmic", which encompasses everything existing and done in front of the camera.

Since the emergence of classical Hollywood style in the early 20th century, during which films were selected to be made based on the popularity of the genre, stars, producers, and directors involved, narrative, usually in the form of the feature film, has held dominance in commercial cinema and has become popularly synonymous with "the movies." Classical, invisible film making (what is often called realist fiction) is central to this popular definition. This key element of this invisible film making lies in continuity editing.

== See also ==
- Actuality film
- Cinematography
- Film genre
- Non-narrative film
- Drama, which deals mainly with film.
