= The Great Adventure (1918 film) =

1918 silent film by Alice Guy-Blaché

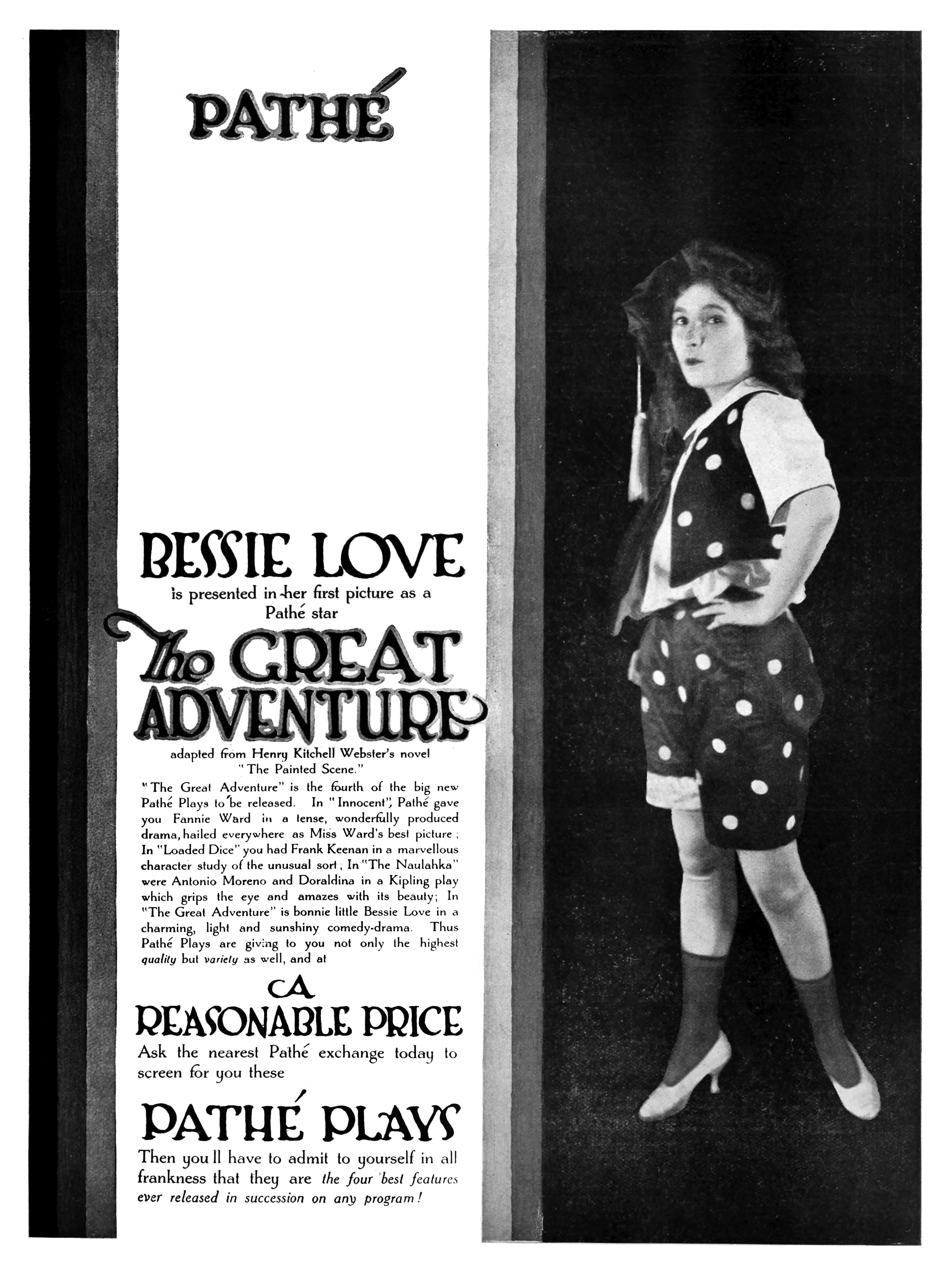
- Magazine advertisement
- Directed by: Alice Guy-Blaché
- Screenplay by: Agnes Christine Johnston
- Based on: "The Painted Scene" (short story) by Henry Kitchell Webster
- Starring: Bessie Love
- Cinematography: George K. Hollister; John G. Haas
- Production company: Pathé Exchange
- Distributed by: Pathé Exchange
- Release dates: March 10, 1918 (U.S.); August 6, 1922 (U.S. re-release)
- Running time: 5 reels (approx. 50 mins; original release); 3 reels (re-release)
- Country: United States
- Language: Silent (English intertitles)

The Great Adventure, also known as Her Great Adventure and Spring of the Year is a 1918 American silent comedy-drama film directed by Alice Guy-Blaché, and starring Bessie Love.

The film is preserved at the BFI National Archive.

== Production ==
The film was made at Solax Studios in Fort Lee, New Jersey.

== Plot ==
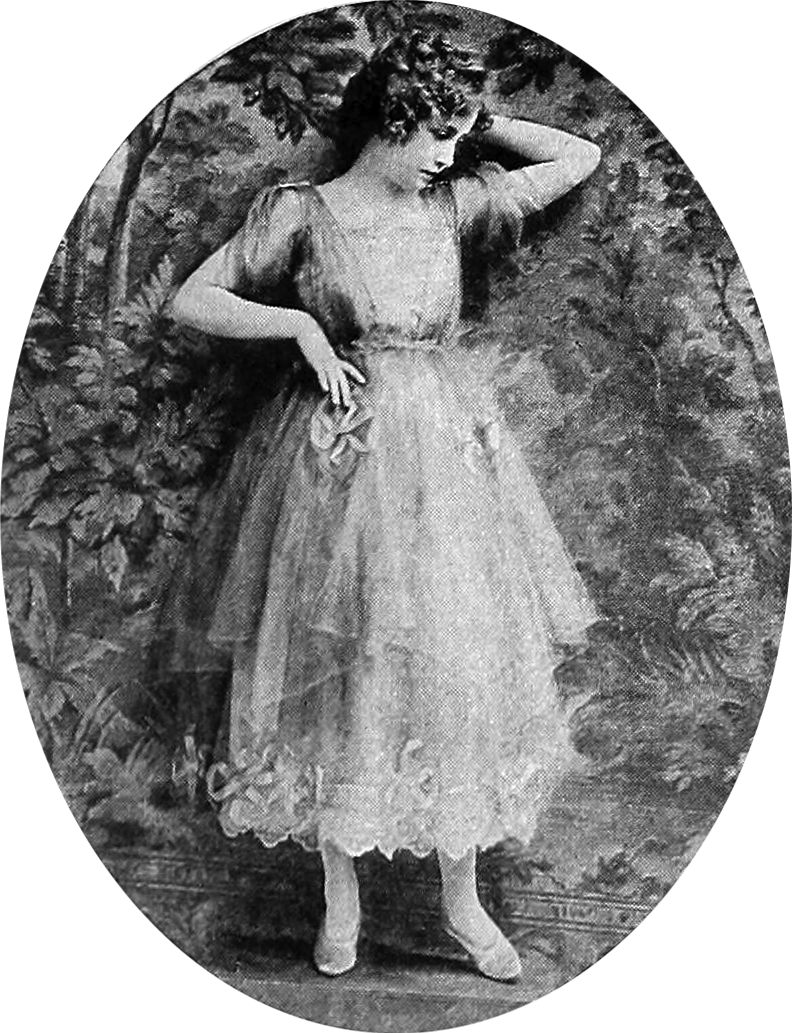
Bessie Love as Rags

Rags has found local success and acclaim in her small town as an actress, but dreams of stardom on Broadway. She and her aunt go to New York, where she unsuccessfully looks for work in a Broadway chorus. On the advice of Billy Blake, she holds up the producer of a Broadway show to get a job. The lead actor in the show, Sheen, likes Rags, but when they go on a date together, he struggles to ride a horse, paddle a canoe, or swim. Embarrassed, he leaves the Broadway show, allowing Billy to take over the male lead and Rags to take over the female lead.

== Cast ==
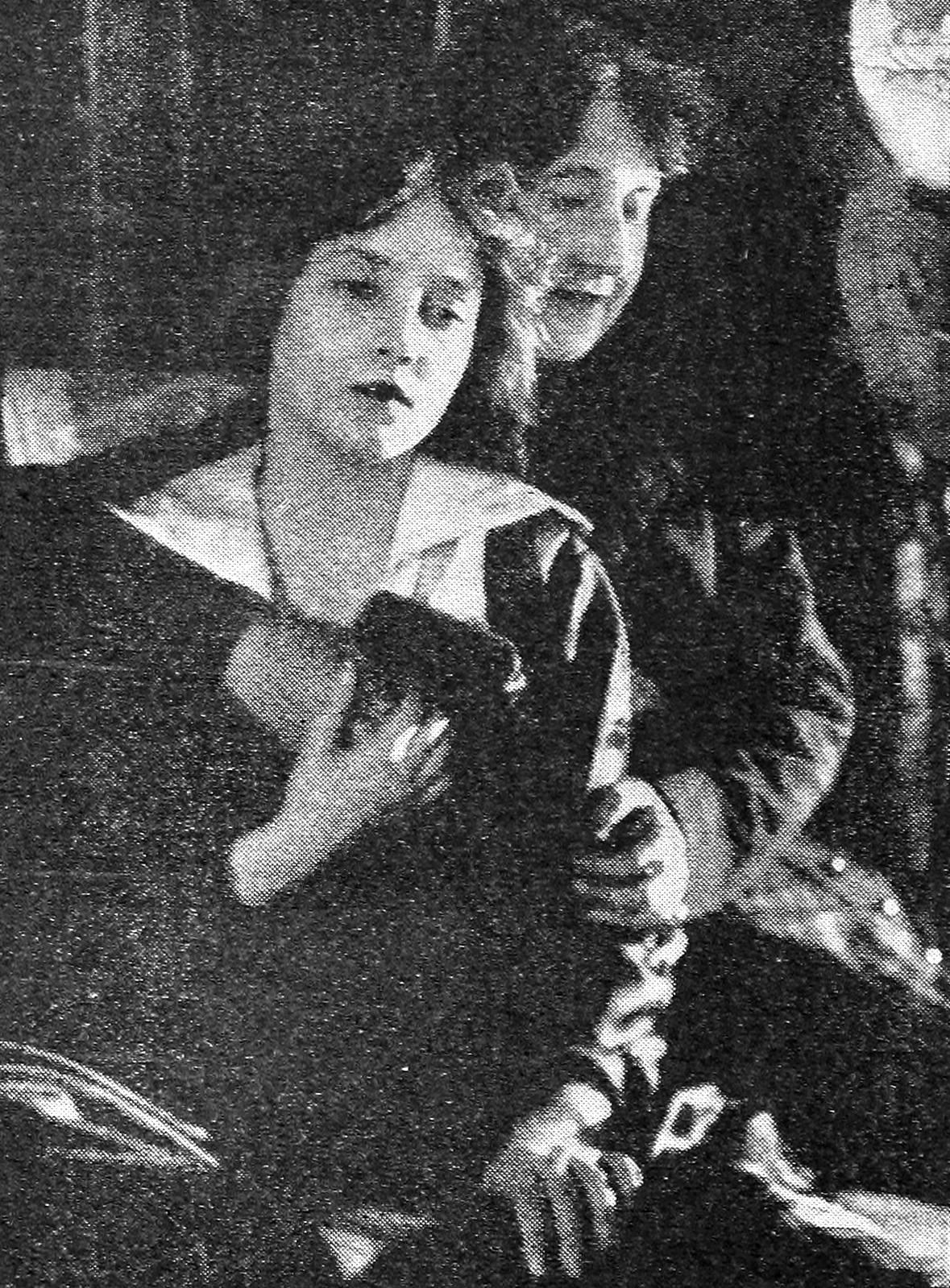
Bessie Love and Flora Finch

- Bessie Love as Ragna "Rags" Jansen
- Flora Finch as Aunt
- Chester Barnett as Billy Blake
- Donald Hall as Sheen
- Florence Short as Hazel Lee
- Walter Craven
- Jack Dunn

== Reception ==
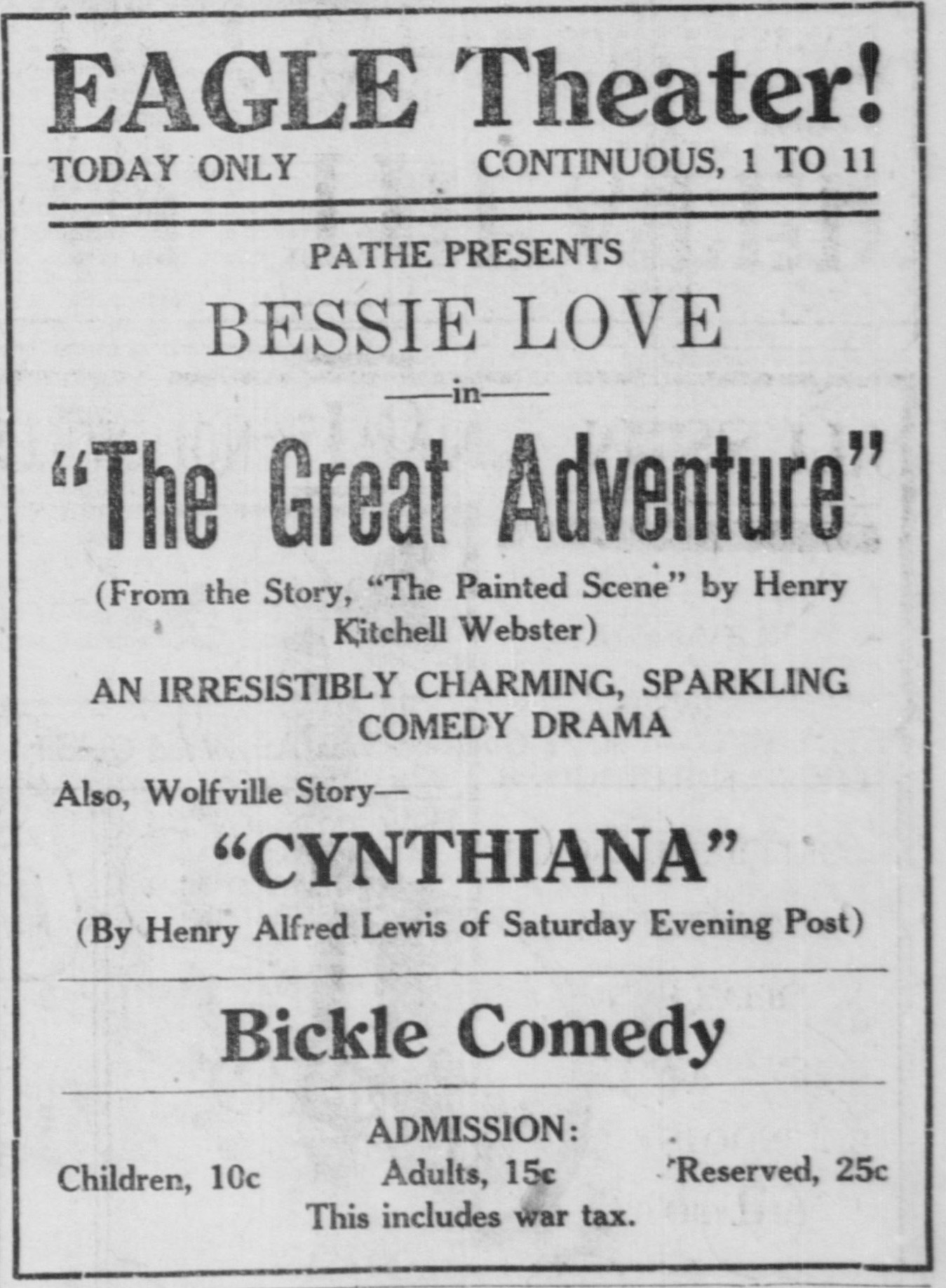
Newspaper advertisement

Love received good reviews for her performance, called "likable", but the film itself did not. It was said that the plot "stretches the imagination of the spectator," with another blaming director Guy-Blaché directly for poorly adapting the source material. Despite the film's critical reception, it was commercially successful.

== Re-release ==
In 1922, the film was edited down to 3 reels, and released as a "Pathé Playlet".
