= A Fool and His Money =

A Fool and His Money may refer to:

- A Fool and His Money (1912 film), a 1912 American silent film
- A Fool and His Money (1920 film), a lost 1920 American silent film
- A Fool and His Money (1925 film), a 1925 silent film
- A Fool and His Money (1989 film), a 1989 American comedy film
