= Matrimony's Speed Limit =

- Directed by: Alice Guy-Blaché
- Produced by: Alice Guy-Blaché
- Starring: Fraunie Fraunholz; Marian Swayne
- Production company: Solax Film Company
- Distributed by: Exclusive Supply Corporation
- Release date: 1913
- Running time: 14 minutes
- Country: United States

Matrimony's Speed Limit is a 1913 silent short film produced and directed by pioneering female film maker Alice Guy-Blaché. It was produced by Solax Studios when it and many other early film studios in America's first motion picture industry were based in Fort Lee, New Jersey, at the beginning of the 20th century. It is one of only about 150 films surviving out of the more than one thousand produced and/or directed by Guy-Blaché.

The film's preservation, along with a few others by Guy-Blaché, was initially financed by the Women's Film Preservation Fund upon its inauguration in 1995. It was selected for preservation in the National Film Registry by the Library of Congress in 2003.

In December 2018, Kino Lorber released a six-disc box, Pioneers: First Women Filmmakers, made in cooperation with the Library of Congress, the British Film Institute and others. The first disc of the set is devoted to the films of Guy-Blaché and includes Matrimony's Speed Limit (1913).

== Plot ==
Matrimony's Speed Limit (1913)

The story concerns a young man (Fraunie Fraunholz) who refuses to accept financial assistance from his wealthy girlfriend (Marian Swayne) in favor of earning his fortune on the stock market. She concocts a plan to convince him that he will collect an inheritance from a wealthy aunt if he marries before noon. While he desperately proposes to every female he meets, she is trying to reach him before he finds a girl who will say yes. One veiled woman seems willing to accept his proposal, but she turns out to be African American (a white actress in blackface). With only minutes to go before the deadline expires, he gives up his search and intends to commit suicide under the wheels of the next passing car. However, the vehicle contains both his fiancée and a minister who marries them on the spot.

== Cast ==
- Fraunie Fraunholz as Fraunie
- Marian Swayne as Marian

== Commentary ==
In a brief essay written for a program at the Library of Congress, Professor Margaret Hennefeld remarks that the protagonist's encounter with the Black woman reveals that "the speed limit of matrimony is, in fact, racial miscegenation (in 1913 American culture)," and that the film "represents a crucial historical text that comically meditates upon the gendered, class, and racial fantasies and anxieties of early twentieth century American culture."
