= The Game-Keeper's Son =

1906 French silent short film

- French: Le fils du garde-chasse
- Directed by: Alice Guy-Blaché
- Production company: Gaumont
- Distributed by: Gaumont
- Release date: 1906
- Running time: 5 minutes
- Country: France

The Game-Keeper's Son (French: Le fils du garde-chasse), is a 1906 French silent short film directed by Alice Guy-Blaché.

== Plot ==
When two poachers kill a game-keeper in the performance of his duties, his young son tracks them down. Despite their almost killing him, he leads the police in pursuit of the one who flees and eventually avenges his father.

== Production and release ==
The film was entirely shot on location in and near the Fontainebleau forest. It was directed by Alice Guy-Blaché and produced by Gaumont.

It was released in France between April and August 1906.

== Analysis ==
The film is composed of five scenes, comprising 10 shots, linked by continuity editing.

The fist scene consists of an establishing shot showing the game-keeper saying good bye to his wife and two sons in front of his house. Once he has left, the older boy, who was forbidden by his father to follow him, leaves nevertheless behind him after making his little brother promise not to betray him.

The four following shots cover the chase of two poachers by the game-keeper after he caught them shooting rabbits. Filmed in the rocky landscape of the Fontainebleau forest, it ends tragically when one of the poachers precipitates the game-keeper into a ravine. The scene is witnessed by the son who was following at a distance.

The next scene shows the boy, back at home announcing the news to his mother and his brother. The three of them are crying when the boy notices the poachers passing in the distance. He rushes after them and the camera pans to follow him.

The following scene shows the poachers arriving at an inn. They sit down, order some wine and sell theirs rabbits to the waitress. The boy picks up a knife on a table and tries to stab the poacher who had killed his father. The poachers easily overpower him but the waitress calls for help. Three policemen arrive and one of them gets hold of one of the poachers. The other poacher escapes, followed by the boy and the other policemen.

The final scene consists of three shots showing a second chase in the forest. The poacher is finally cornered at the very place where he had killed the game-keeper. The boy stabs him and the poacher falls into the ravine. The policemen join the boy and congratulate him.

Regarding the cinematography of this film, Alison McMahan notes that "The deep-focus (...) is characteristic of Guy's visual aesthetic, also apparent in La Passion." She also places the film in a wider context by explaining that "hunters and gamekeepers were (...) recurring characters in early Gaumont films, with the gamekeepers representing honor and order."

Joan Simon considers that "in treating the archetypal French conflict between gamekeepers and poachers, [Guy] sides with authority and not rebellion." This would be confirmed by the ending of the film where the policemen shake hand with the boy who has just stabbed his father's murderer. One is left to wonder whether the young boy is really siding with authority when killing the murderer rather than letting the police arrest him. The Gaumont archive indeed describes the film as "a realistic illustration of the lex talionis".
