= Alice Guy-Blaché =

French film director (1873–1968)

Alice Guy
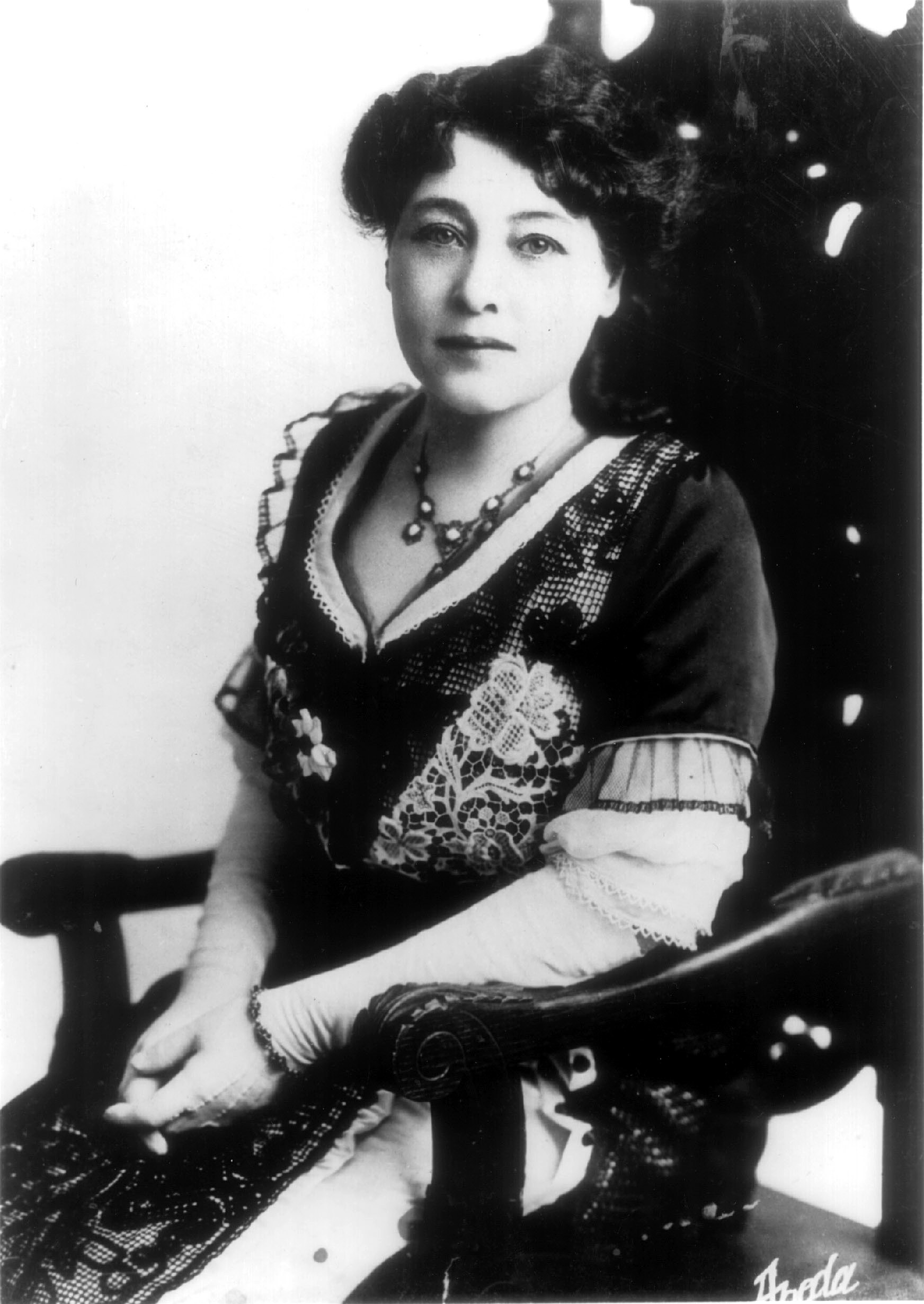
- Alice Guy-Blaché in 1896
- Born: Alice Ida Antoinette Guy; 1 July 1873; Saint-Mandé, France
- Died: 24 March 1968 (aged 94); Wayne, New Jersey, U.S.
- Resting place: Maryrest Cemetery, Mahwah, New Jersey, U.S.
- Occupations: Film director; screenwriter; producer
- Years active: 1894–1922
- Spouse: Herbert Blaché (m. 1907; div. 1922)
- Children: 2

Signature
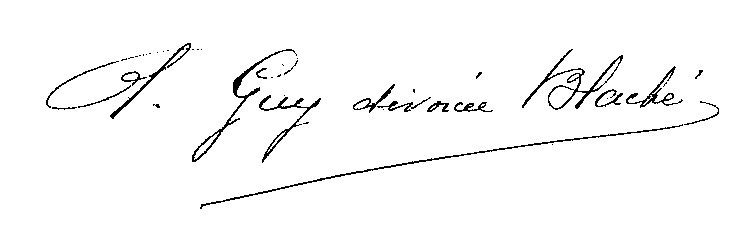

Alice Ida Antoinette Guy-Blaché (French: [alis gi blɑʃe]; née Guy; 1 July 1873 – 24 March 1968) was a French pioneer film director. She was the first filmmaker to make a narrative fiction film, as well as the first woman to direct a film. From 1896 to 1906, she was probably the only female filmmaker in the world. Her first film was La Fée aux Choux (The Fairy of the Cabbages; 1896), and her last was Tarnished Reputations (1920). She experimented with Gaumont's Chronophone sync-sound system, and with color-tinting, interracial casting, and special effects. She was artistic director and a co-founder of Solax Studios in Flushing, New York. In 1912, Solax invested $100,000 ($3.34 million in 2025) for a new studio in Fort Lee, New Jersey, the center of American filmmaking prior to the establishment of Hollywood. That year, she made the film A Fool and His Money, probably the first to have an all-African-American cast.

== Early life and education ==
In 1865, Guy's father, Émile Guy, an owner of a bookstore and publishing company in Santiago, Chile and Valparaíso, Chile, married Marie Clotilde Franceline Aubert. Both were French, but lived in Santiago, where Émile ran a bookstore. The couple returned to Santiago after the wedding in Paris. There was a devastating smallpox epidemic in Chile in 1872 and 1873. Émile and Marie Guy brought all four of their children to Paris, where Alice was born. In her autobiography, Alice refers to this as her mother's attempt to make sure "her fifth child should be truly French". Alice Ida Antoinette Guy was born on 1 July 1873 in Saint-Mandé, near Paris, France. Her father returned to Chile soon after her birth, and her mother followed a few months later. Alice was left in the care of her grandmother in Carouge, Switzerland. When Alice was three or four, her mother took her to South America.

At the age of six, Guy was taken back to France by her father to attend the Faithful Companions of Jesus boarding school. It was sometimes referred to as Sacred Heart after it was relocated to France- The Sacred Heart is associated with the Jesuits who were banned in Switzerland, whereas The Faithful Companions of Jesus was a separate order. The school where Alice Guy lived was in Veyrier-sous-Saleve in France. The building still exists 100 meters from the Swiss border, but had only been running for two years when Alice arrived. (Note: The mother superior, Emilie Guers, was close to the foundress, Marie-Madeleine de Bengy, for 25 years (1833-1858). They lived together in the Mother House in Carouge for 15 years (1833-1848). When Sophie Barat's Sacred Heart convents were expelled from Switzerland in 1847, the foundress Marie-Madeleine and Emilie Guers went to Veyrier-sous-Saleve in France to purchase a property just in case the Faithful Companions were also expelled from Switzerland. The foundress moved to Paris in 1848 to give the boarding school a lower profile. After that, Emilie Guers managed to stay in Carouge for another 28 years, until 1875. Other religious groups left voluntarily under pressure, but Mother Emilie made the government of Geneva kick her out. When the school was finally expelled in 1875, Mother Emilie moved the school to Viry for two years while the school was being built in Veyrier-sous-Saleve. The school moved from Viry to Veyrier-sous-Saleve in 1877, two years before Alice arrived.) Her sisters were already there. The mother superior, Emilie Guers, a native of Geneva, expelled from her own country on short notice, regularly told the story of her expulsion. (Note: Vie de Emilie Guers, Therese de Rancé, fcj, Paris, 2000, p.23.) Alice heard the story repeatedly and mentioned it in her memoirs. Alice called the Mother Superior "a very great lady who wanted to make us strong, accomplished women." (Note: The Famous Boarding School at Veyrier, Janelle Dietrick, 2022.)

Alice's older brother died on 16 May 1880 at age 13. Guy and her sister Louise were moved to a convent in Ferney a few years later and then brought back to Paris.

Guy's father died on 5 January 1891 of unknown causes. Following his death, Guy's mother got a job with Mutualité maternelle which was founded on 20 May 1891. Her mother was unable to keep that job and thereafter Guy trained as a typist and stenographer, a new field at the time, to support herself and her mother. She landed her first stenography-typist job at a varnish factory. In March 1894, she began working at the 'Comptoir général de la photographie' owned by Félix-Max Richard. Léon Gaumont later took over and headed the company.

== Career ==
=== Secretary to Léon Gaumont ===
In 1894, Alice Guy was hired by Félix-Max Richard to work as a secretary for a camera manufacturing and photography supply company. The company changed hands in 1895 due to a court decision against Félix-Max Richard, who sold the company to four men: Gustave Eiffel, Joseph Vallot, Alfred Besnier, and Léon Gaumont. Gustave Eiffel was president of the company, and Léon Gaumont, thirty years Eiffel's junior, was the manager. The company was named after Gaumont because Eiffel was the subject of a national scandal regarding the Panama Canal. L. Gaumont et C^{ie} became a major force in the fledgling motion-picture industry in France. Alice continued to work at Gaumont et C^{ie}, a decision that led to a pioneering career in filmmaking that spanned more than 25 years and involved her directing, producing, writing and/or overseeing more than 700 films.

Although she initially began working for Léon Gaumont as his secretary, Guy became familiar with his clients, relevant marketing strategies, and the company's stock of cameras. She also met a handful of pioneering film engineers such as Georges Demenÿ and Auguste and Louis Lumière.

Guy and Gaumont attended the "surprise" Lumière event on March 22, 1895. It was the first demonstration of film projection, an obstacle that Gaumont, the Lumières, and Edison were all racing to solve. They screened one of their early films Workers Leaving the Lumière Factory, which consisted of a simple scene of workmen leaving the Lumière plant in Lyon. Bored with the idea of captured film only being used for the scientific and/or promotional purpose of selling cameras in the form of "demonstration films," Guy was confident that she could incorporate fictional story-telling elements into film. She asked Gaumont for permission to make her own film, and he granted it.

=== Early filmmaking at Gaumont ===
La Fée aux Choux (1900)

Guy made her first film in 1896. Its original title may have been La Fée aux Choux (The Fairy of the Cabbages) or The Birth of Children, or it may have had no title at first. The scene Alice described as her debut effort does not match either the 1900 version of La Fée aux choux or the 1902 version, retitled Sage-femme de première classe which has been found in film archives. By comparing Alice's descriptions of her debut effort with the two films that are available for us to view, we discover differences that indicate there was a third film that came first. The 1896 film seems to be lost. However, multiple points of confirmation indicate that there were three different La Fée aux choux. A 30 July 1896 newspaper describes a "chaste fiction of children born under the cabbages in a wonderfully framed chromo landscape," and provides other details that confirm Alice Guy's description of her first film. "Before very long," Alice Guy reported in 1912, "every moving picture house in the country was turning out stories instead of spectacles and plots instead of panoramas."

A serpentine dance performed by Bob Walter

From 1896 to 1906, Alice Guy was Gaumont's head of production and is generally considered the first filmmaker to systematically develop narrative filmmaking. She was probably the only female director from 1896 to 1906. Her earlier films share many characteristics and themes with her contemporary competitors, such as the Lumières and Méliès. She explored dance and travel films, often combining the two, such as Le Boléro performed by Saharet (1905) and Tango (1905). Many of Guy's early dance films were popular in music-hall attractions such as the serpentine dance films – also a staple of the Lumières and Thomas Edison film catalogs.

She experimented with Gaumont's Chronophone sync-sound system, and with color-tinting, interracial casting, and special effects. In 1906, Guy made The Life of Christ, a big-budget production for the time, which included 300 extras. She used the illustrated James Tissot New Testament as reference material for the film, which featured 25 episodes and was her largest production at Gaumont to date. In addition to this, she was one of the pioneers in the use of audio recordings in conjunction with the images on screen in Gaumont's "Chronophone" system, which used a vertical-cut disc synchronized to the film. She employed some of the first special effects, including using double exposure, masking techniques, and running a film backward. During her tenure at Gaumont, Guy hired and trained Louis Feuillade and Étienne Arnaud as writers and directors and hired set designer Henri Ménessier and art director Ben Carré.

=== Later works at The Solax Company ===
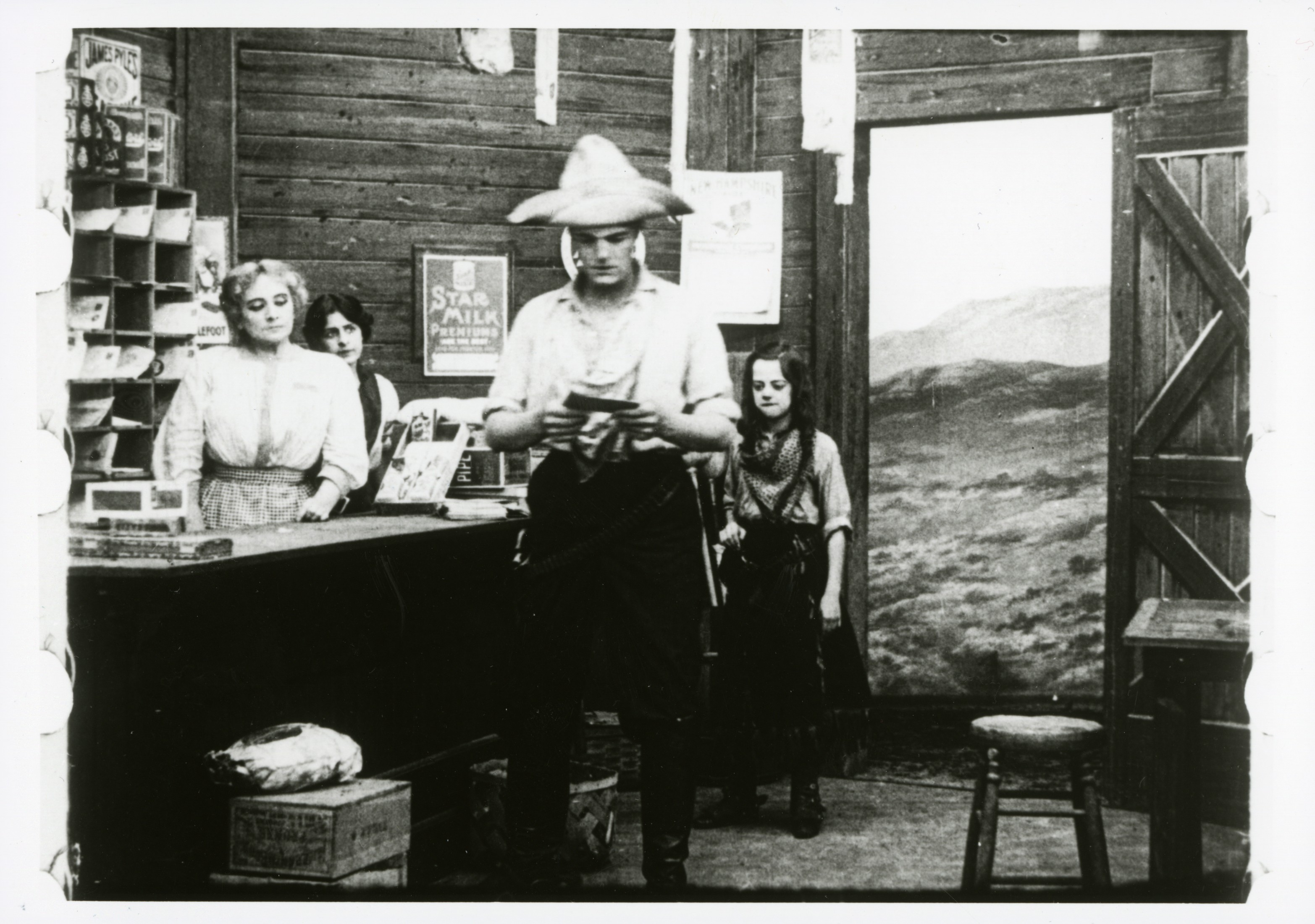
Still from Two Little Rangers (1912)

In 1907, Alice Guy married Herbert Blaché, who was soon appointed the production manager for Gaumont's operations in the United States. After working with her husband for Gaumont in the U.S., the two established their own business in 1910, partnering with George A. Magie in the formation of The Solax Company in Flushing, New York, the largest pre-Hollywood studio in America.

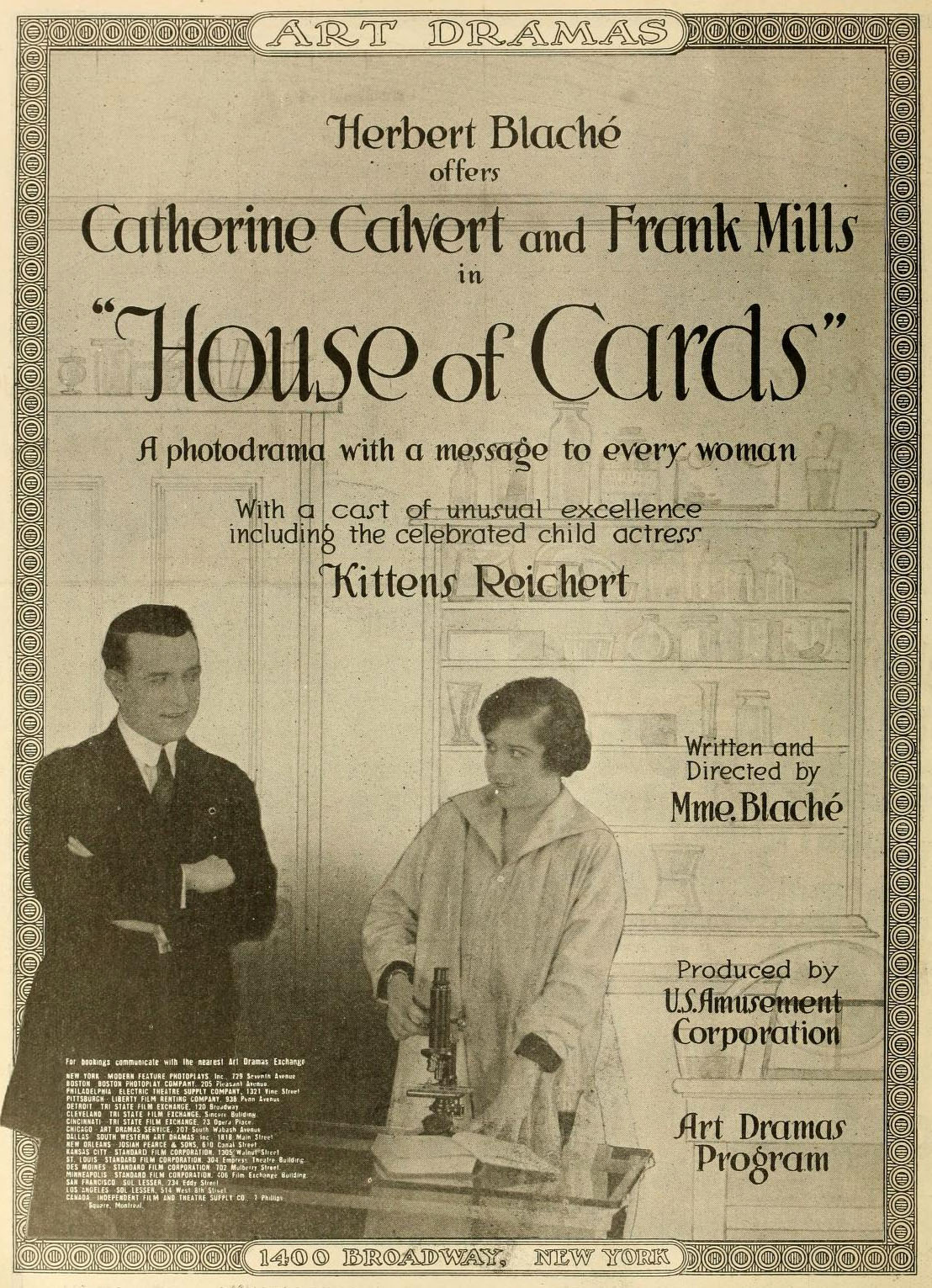
Catherine Calvert in House of Cards (1917)

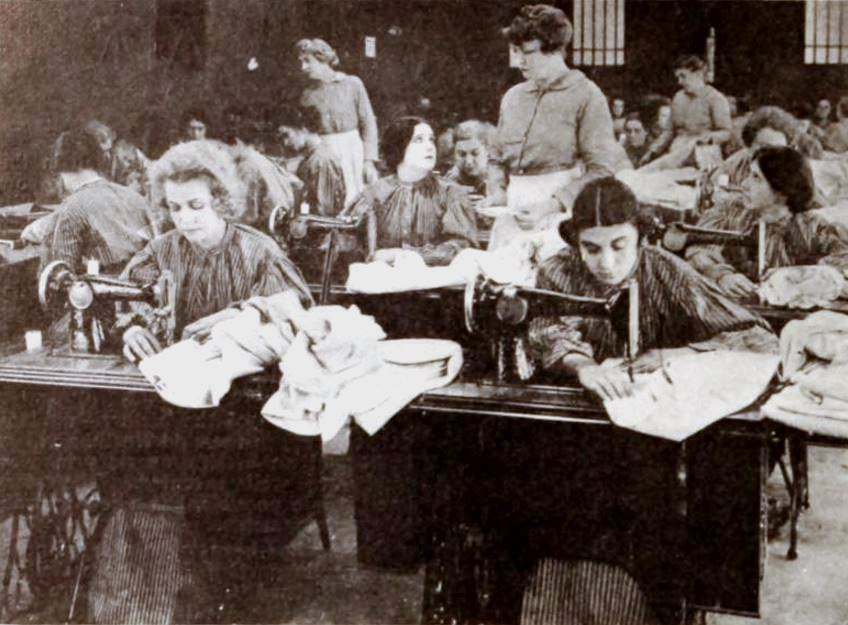
Still from Tarnished Reputations (1920)

With production facilities for their new company in Flushing, New York, her husband served as production manager and cinematographer. Guy-Blaché worked as the artistic director and directed many of its releases. Within two years, they had become so successful that they invested more than $100,000 ($3.34 million in 2025) into new and technologically advanced production facilities in Fort Lee, New Jersey, in 1912. Many early film studios were based in Fort Lee at the beginning of the 20th century. This made her the first woman to own her own studio and studio plant. It was mentioned in publications of the era that Guy-Blaché placed a large sign in her studio that read: "Be Natural".

In 1912, she made the film A Fool and His Money, probably the first to have an all-African-American cast. The film is now preserved at the National Center for Film and Video Preservation at the American Film Institute for its historical and aesthetic significance.

In 1913, Guy-Blaché directed The Thief, the first script sold by future Wonder Woman creator William Moulton Marston.

Guy-Blaché and her husband divorced in 1922, and with the rise of the more hospitable and cost-effective climate in Hollywood, their film partnership also ended.

== Personal life and death ==
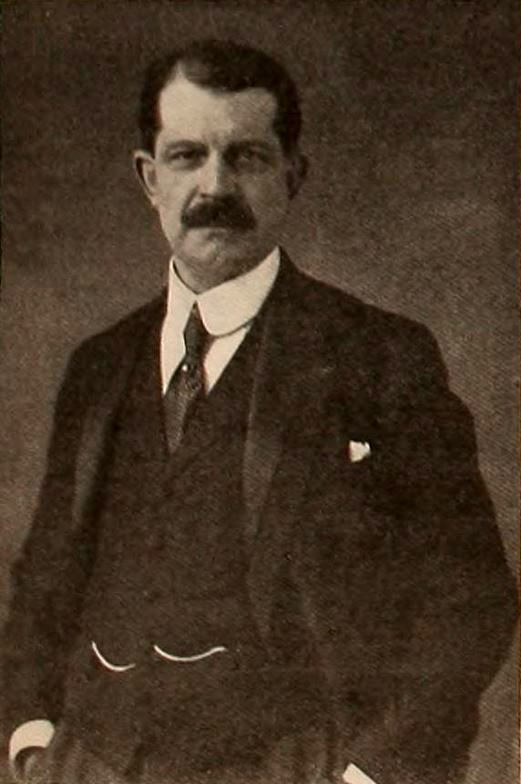
Léon Gaumont

Guy-Blaché's marriage meant that she had to resign from her position working with Gaumont. The couple was sent by the Gaumont company to Cleveland to facilitate the franchise of Gaumont equipment. Early in 1908, the couple went to New York City where Guy-Blaché gave birth to her daughter, Simone, in September 1908. Two years later, Guy-Blaché became the first woman to run her own studio when she created Solax in Gaumont's Flushing studio. In 1912, when she was pregnant with her second child, she built a studio in Fort Lee, New Jersey, and continued to complete one to three films a week. On 27 June 1912, Reginald, her son, was born. To focus on writing and directing, Guy-Blaché took her husband into Solax in 1913 "for feature production and executive direction".

Shortly after taking the position, Herbert Blaché started a film company named Blaché Features, Inc. The couple maintained a personal and business partnership for the next few years, working together on many projects. In 1918, Herbert Blaché left his wife and children to pursue a career in Hollywood. Guy-Blaché almost died from the Spanish flu pandemic in October 1918 while filming her final film Tarnished Reputations. Following her illness, she joined Herbert in Hollywood in 1919 but they lived separately. She worked as Herbert's directing assistant on his two films starring Alla Nazimova.

Guy-Blaché directed her last film in 1919. In 1921, she was forced to auction her film studio and other possessions in bankruptcy. Alice and Herbert were officially divorced in 1922. She returned to France in 1922 and never made another film.

Guy-Blaché never remarried, and in 1964 she returned to the United States to live in Wayne, New Jersey, with her older child, her daughter, Simone. On 24 March 1968, at 94, Alice Guy-Blaché died in a nursing home in Wayne. She is interred at Maryrest Cemetery.

== Legacy ==
"There is nothing connected with the staging of a motion picture that a woman cannot do as easily as a man, and there is no reason she cannot master every technicality of the art...In the arts of acting, painting, music, and literature women have long held their place among the most successful workers, and when it is considered how vitally these arts enter into the production of motion pictures one wonders why the names of scores of women are not found among the most successful creators of photodrama offerings."—Alice Guy-Blaché in The Moving Picture World, July 11, 1914.

Guy-Blaché was one of the first filmmakers to make a narrative fiction film, as well as the first woman to direct a film. From 1896 to 1906, she was probably the only female filmmaker in the world. Between 1896 and 1920, she directed over 1,000 films, some 150 of which survive, and 22 of which are feature-length. She was one of the first women, along with Lois Weber, to manage and own her own studio: The Solax Company. Few of her films survive in an easily viewable format. Matrimony's Speed Limit (1913) was selected for preservation in the National Film Registry of the Library of Congress in 2003.

In the late 1940s, Alice Guy-Blaché wrote an autobiography. It was published, in French, in 1976 and was translated into English a decade later with the help of her daughter Simone, daughter-in-law Roberta Blaché, and the film writer Anthony Slide. Guy-Blaché was concerned with her unexplained absence from the historical record of the film industry. She regularly communicated with colleagues and film historians, correcting previously made and supposedly factual statements about her life. She crafted lengthy lists of her films as she remembered them, with the hope of being able to assume creative ownership and receive legitimate credit for them.

Guy-Blaché was an early influence on both Alfred Hitchcock and Sergei Eisenstein. Hitchcock remarked, "I'd be over the moon with the Frenchman George Méliès. I was thrilled by the movies of D.W. Griffith and the early French director Alice Guy."

In his Memoirs, Eisenstein described an unnamed film he had seen as a child that continued to be very important to him. This film was identified as Alice Guy-Blaché's The Consequences of Feminism (1906) during the making of the documentary Be Natural: The Untold Story of Alice Guy-Blaché.

Because of Be Natural: The Untold Story of Alice Guy-Blaché, many of Guy-Blaché's films were restored and preserved, and a pillar in her name is featured at the Academy Museum of Motion Pictures.

In September 2019, Guy-Blaché was included in The New York Times series "Overlooked No More".

=== In film and TV ===
Guy-Blaché was the subject of a National Film Board of Canada documentary The Lost Garden: The Life and Cinema of Alice Guy-Blaché by director Marquise Lepage in 2012, which received Quebec's Gémeaux Award for Best Documentary. In 2002, film scholar Alison McMahan published Alice Guy Blaché: Lost Visionary of the Cinema.

The 2018 documentary film Be Natural: The Untold Story of Alice Guy-Blaché, directed by Pamela B. Green and narrated by Jodie Foster, which opened at the Cannes Film Festival (Cannes Classics), deals with Guy-Blaché's life, career, and legacy.

In December 2018, Kino Lorber released a six-disc box, Pioneers: First Women Filmmakers, in cooperation with the Library of Congress, the British Film Institute, and others. The first disc of the set is devoted to the films of Guy-Blaché. It includes Matrimony's Speed Limit (1913), which was selected for preservation in the National Film Registry of the Library of Congress in 2003.

As reported by Deadline in 2021, Pamela B. Green was developing a feature biopic about Guy-Blaché.

In 2021, French-German TV channel Arte produced a documentary on Alice Guy-Blaché titled Alice Guy, the unknown lady of the 7th art, directed by Valérie Urréa and Nathalie Masduraud, voiced by Agnès Jaoui and Maud Wyler.

The upcoming six-part Wild Bunch TV / HBO/ France Télévisions series Alice stars Bérénice Bejo as Guy-Blaché. Irish playwright Tim Loane and Claire Lemaréchal co-created and wrote the series.

== Accolades and tributes ==
On December 12, 1958, Guy-Blaché was awarded the Légion d'honneur, the highest non-military award France offers. On 16 March 1957, she was honored in a Cinémathèque française ceremony that went almost unnoticed by the press.

In 2002, Circle X Theatre in Los Angeles produced Laura Comstock's Bag-punching Dog, a musical about the invention of cinema, and Alice Guy-Blaché was the lead character. The musical was written by Jillian Armenante, Alice Dodd, and Chris Jeffries. In 2011, an off-Broadway production of Flight premiered at the Connelly Theatre, featuring a fictionalized portrayal of Guy-Blaché as a 1913 documentary filmmaker.

In 2004, the Fort Lee Film Commission unveiled a historical marker dedicated to Alice Guy-Blaché at the location of Solax Studio. In 2012, for the centennial of the founding and building of the studio, the Commission raised funds to replace her grave marker in Maryrest Cemetery in Mahwah, New Jersey. The new marker notes Guy-Blaché's role as a cinema pioneer.

In 2010, the Academy Film Archive preserved Alice Guy-Blaché's short film The Girl in the Arm-Chair. In 2011, the Fort Lee Film Commission successfully lobbied the Directors Guild of America to accept Alice Guy-Blaché as a member. She was subsequently awarded a posthumous "Special Directorial Award for Lifetime Achievement" at the 2011 DGA Honors. In 2013, Guy-Blaché was inducted into the New Jersey Hall of Fame.

In 2018, film journalist Véronique Le Bris founded the Alice Guy Prize, granted yearly to highlight the woman film-maker of the year.

A square in the 14th arrondissement of Paris is named the Place Alice-Guy in her honor.

In 2019, the re-edited and expanded version of Eisenstein's memoirs, Yo. Memoirs by Sergei Eisenstein mention Alice's The Consequences of Feminism and its influence on Eisenstein.

In 2021, Yale University opened its new state-of-the-art screening room, named the Alice Cinema, after Alice Guy-Blaché.

In 2022, Rowman & Littlefield published a new edition of The Memoirs of Alice Guy Blaché, edited by Anthony Slide and translated by Simone Blaché and Roberta Blaché. This memoir contains a new introduction by Slide.

The Golden Door Film Festival gives an award named in her honor.

On the occasion of the 150th anniversary of her birth, around July 1, 2023, several French institutions celebrated Alice Guy and her legacy:

- The Cinémathèque Française held a special day of hommage with the showing of 8 of her films. It also uploaded a 2K resolution digitization of the very first known making-of in the history of cinéma, Alice Guy tourne une phonoscène (Alice Guy shoots a phonoscene - [the ancestor of the music video], 1907, by anonym) on its online film portal, Henri.
- French postal service La Poste launched a special edition stamp at her effigy which was presented by her great-grandson Thierry Peeters at philately center Carré d'Encre on July 3, 2023.
- Newly re-opened Paris museum of history of immigration Cité nationale de l'histoire de l'immigration shares within its new permanent exhibition several of Alice Guy's films, amongst which L'Américanisé (1912), to illustrate the experience of immigrants to the United States (like Alice Guy herself).

== Selected filmography ==
These films were produced by Gaumont (1896–1907), Solax (1910–1913), or others (1914–1920).

- La Fée aux Choux (The Fairy of the Cabbages; 1896)
- Le pêcheur dans le torrent (The fisherman in the stream; 1897)
- Le chiffonnier (1898)
- Danse serpentine (1900)
- Les Fredaines de Pierrette (1900)
- Miss Dundee et ses chiens savants (1902)
- Esméralda (1905) (based on the 1831 Victor Hugo novel The Hunchback of Notre-Dame)
- La Statue (1905)
- Une histoire roulante (1906)
- The Birth, the Life and the Death of Christ (1906)
- Les Résultats du féminisme (1906)
- The Game-Keeper's Son (1906)
- Madame a des envies (1906)
- 'L'Enfant sur la barricade (1907)
- Fanfan la Tulipe (1907)
- One Touch of Nature (1910)
- The Sergeant's Daughter (1910)
- The Pawnshop (1910)
- Greater Love Hath No Man (1911)
- Algie the Miner (1912)
- Falling Leaves (1912)
- A Fool and His Money (1912)
- Making an American Citizen (1912)
- The Girl in the Arm-Chair (1912)
- Two Little Rangers (1912)
- The Pit and the Pendulum (1913)
- Matrimony's Speed Limit (1913)
- A House Divided (1913)
- Shadows of the Moulin Rouge (1913)
- The Lure (1914)
- The Shooting of Dan McGrew (1915)
- The Vampire (1915)
- The Ocean Waif (1916)
- What Will People Say? (1916)
- The Adventurer (1917)
- The Empress (1917)
- The Great Adventure (1918)
- Tarnished Reputations (1920)

== See also ==
- Women's cinema
