= Greater Love Hath No Man =

- Directed by: Alice Guy-Blaché
- Produced by: Solax Studios
- Distributed by: General Film Company
- Release date: June 30, 1911
- Country: USA
- Language: Silent..English titles

Greater Love Hath No Man is a 1911 silent film short directed by Alice Guy and produced by the Solax Company.

It is preserved in the Library of Congress.

This film was one of several films by Alice Guy Blache digitally restored for the Alice Guy Blache Retrospective at the Whitney Museum of American Art that ran from November 6, 2009 to January 24, 2010.
