= Les Résultats du féminisme =

1906 film by Alice Guy-Blaché

- English: The Consequences of Feminism
- Directed by: Alice Guy
- Distributed by: Gaumont
- Release date: 1906
- Running time: 7 minutes
- Country: France
- Language: Silent film

Les Résultats du féminisme (The Consequences of Feminism) is a 1906 French silent comedy film directed by Alice Guy. It was remade in 1912 as In the Year 2000.

== Plot ==
A society where the roles of men and women have been inverted. Effeminate men sew, iron and take care of the children, while macho women drink and read newspapers in cafés, and court men.
