= Be Natural: The Untold Story of Alice Guy-Blaché =

Be Natural: The Untold Story of Alice Guy−Blaché
- Directed by: Pamela B. Green
- Written by: Pamela B. Green; Joan Simon
- Produced by: Pamela B. Green
- Narrated by: Jodie Foster
- Cinematography: Boubkar Benzabat
- Edited by: Pamela B. Green
- Music by: Peter G. Adams
- Production company: Be Natural Productions
- Distributed by: Zeitgeist Films
- Release dates: May 11, 2018 (Cannes); April 19, 2019 (Theatrical release)
- Running time: 120 minutes, (original cut); 103 minutes (final cut)
- Country: United States
- Language: English
- Box office: $206,903

Be Natural: The Untold Story of Alice Guy-Blaché is a 2018 documentary about the first female filmmaker Alice Guy-Blaché, directed by Pamela B. Green. It was screened out of competition at the 2018 Cannes Film Festival in the Cannes Classics category. It was nominated for the festival's L'Œil d'or documentary prize. Be Natural went on to screen at Telluride, Deauville American Film Festival, New York Film Festival, and London BFI Film Festival.

== Synopsis ==
Narrated by Jodie Foster, Be Natural: The Untold Story of Alice Guy-Blaché is a two-hour feature documentary investigating the full scope of the life and work of cinema's first female director, screenwriter, producer, and studio owner Alice Guy-Blaché.

== Production ==
The project was launched with a successful Kickstarter campaign, which prompted other crowdfunding opportunities.

== Critical response ==
Reviews for the version of the film screened at Cannes were generally positive, with Deadline's Pete Hammond claiming it to be perhaps "The Best (And Least-Seen) Film in Cannes." Overall, critics positively reviewed the film. On review aggregator Rotten Tomatoes, the film holds a 96% approval rating based on 92 reviews. The site's critical consensus reads, "Be Natural: The Untold Story of Alice Guy-Blaché aims an overdue spotlight on a cinematic innovator's career, with the added benefit of absorbing historical context." Reviewing for The Hollywood Reporter, Leslie Felperin considered that Be Natural "represents a timely contribution to the international conversation about the challenges facing women filmmakers while also boosting the reputation of someone who really should be better known by now as a role model. As a teaching and consciousness-raising tool, it will be an indispensable resource." A. O. Scott for The New York Times wrote, "Be Natural is inspiring because it is also appalling."

In a less positive review, Jay Weissberg wrote in Variety: "there's that title, The Untold Story, which ignores a number of earlier documentaries not to mention the significant amount of scholarship on pioneering filmmaker Alice Guy-Blaché. ... These are what can be called inconvenient truths, for Pamela B. Green, director of Be Natural, is on a mission to discover why—supposedly—no one has ever heard of Alice Guy-Blaché."

Be Natural premiered in the UK on January 17, 2020. Peter Bradshaw of The Guardian gave the film a 4 out of 5 star rating, calling it a "fascinating documentary." He also picked Be Natural as one of his 10 best documentaries of 2020. Gaby Wood of The Telegraph gave a positive review, calling it "gripping and poetic." Danny Leigh of The Financial Times also gave the film 4 out of 5 stars, stating: "With timing both flawless and bleak, few films arrive feeling so vital as Be Natural: The Untold Story of Alice Guy-Blaché." In December, the film was named one of the 50 Best Films of 2020 in the UK by The Guardian.

Be Natural premiered in France on June 22, 2020. Véronique Cauhapé of Le Monde gave the film 4 out of 5 stars.

== Awards and nominations ==
Year	Award	Category	Result	Ref.
2018	Cannes Film Festival L'Oeil D'Or	Documentary	Nominated	
2018	ADC Merit Award	Motion / Film Craft	Won	
2019	Clio Entertainment Award Silver Prize	Best Audio-Visual Technique in Motion Graphics	Won	
2019	Clio Entertainment Award Grand Prize	Best Audio/Visual Technique in Motion Graphics	Nominated	
2019	Critics' Choice Award	Best First Documentary Feature for Be Natural	Nominated	
2020	Bangkok International Documentary Awards	Best Feature Documentary	Won	
2020	AEAF Awards	Best Title / Opener	Nominated	
2020	Monadnock International Film Festival	Best Documentary Feature	Won	
2020	FOCAL International Film Festival	Best Use of Footage in a Cinematic Feature for Be Natural Jane Mercer Researcher of the Year Award for Be Natural	Won	
2020	FOCAL International Film Festival	Best Use of Footage in an Arts Production for Be Natural Best Use of Footage in a History Feature for Be Natural Student Jury Award for Be Natural	Nominated	
2020	International Filmmor Women's Film Festival	Audience Award Best Documentary	Nominated	
2020	Vancouver International Women in Film Festival	Best Documentary	Won	
2020	Split International Festival of New Film	Best Documentary	Nominated	
2021	News and Documentary Emmy Awards	Outstanding Research: Documentary	Nominated	
2021	Peabody Awards	Arts	Nominated	
