= Phonoscène =

Early version of sound film

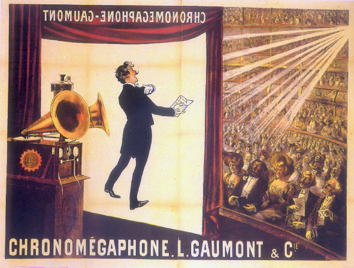
1902 poster advertising Gaumont's sound films

The Phonoscène was an antecedent of music video and was regarded by Michel Chion, Noël Burch and Richard Abel as a forerunner of sound film. The first Phonoscènes were presented by Léon Gaumont in 1902 in France. The first official presentation in the United Kingdom took place at Buckingham Palace in 1907. The last phonoscène was presented in 1917.

== Technology ==
The Phonoscène was a forerunner of sound film. It combined a chronophone sound recording with a chronograph film shot with actors lip-synching to the sound recording. The recording and film were synchronized by a mechanism patented by Léon Gaumont in 1902.

Phonoscènes were played on an apparatus known as a Chronophone or a later development of it known as a Chronomegaphone. Both variants typically had two turntables and two speaker horns, and both used compressed air to amplify the sound.

Phonoscènes were typically the duration of one gramophone record, including only one song, but longer sound-on-disc films were made of operas. Faust (1907) ran for 1 hour and 6 minutes, with 22 scenes, presumably with the audio content on 22 separate discs. The method of production, because it involved lip-synching, was only well-suited to recording singing, not spoken drama. Most Phonoscènes were in French language, but some were in English, German, or Italian.

The sound recordings were mostly issued on 16 inch discs, but also some 12 or 10 inch discs, based on a collection of around 100 such recordings in the Motion Picture, Broadcasting and Recorded Sound Division of the Library of Congress.

== History ==
The first Phonoscènes were presented by Gaumont in 1902 in France.

=== Introduction in London ===
"The Flowers that Bloom in the Spring", 1907

Phonoscènes were presented at Buckingham Palace on 4 April 1907 before Alexandra of Denmark, the Dowager Empress of Russia, the Prince and Princess of Wales and their children, The Princess Victoria, The Hon. Charlotte Knollys, General Sir Dighton Probyn, V.C., Mdlle. Ozeroff, The Hon. Sidney Greville (Royal Household of the United Kingdom), Colonel Blocklehurst and Colonel Frederick. The "singing pictures", as the British press called them, were projected on a screen over a bank of palms. The programme was a selection of phonoscènes previously presented at the London Hippodrome, as follows:

- The Miserere scene from Il Trovatore,
- The Captain's song and chorus from H.M.S. Pinafore,
- Tit-Willow from The Mikado,
- This little Girl and That, a song and dance from The Little Michus, and
- The Serenade from Charles Gounod's opera Faust.

=== Belle Époque ===
A phonoscène of Félix Mayol by Alice Guy-Blaché

The three major French Belle Époque celebrities, Félix Mayol, Dranem and Polin were recorded by Alice Guy-Blaché using the Chronophone Sound-on-disc system to make phonoscènes.

=== Last phonoscène to be projected and heard ===
J'ai du Cinéma was the last presented phonoscène at the Gaumont Palace ("Greatest Cinema Theatre of the world") on 29 June 1917.
