= Georges Deneubourg =

French actor (1860–1936)

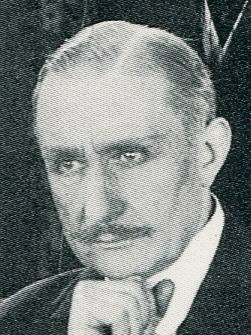
- Born: 23 November 1860; Paris, France
- Died: 23 March 1936 (aged 75); Couilly-Pont-aux-Dames, Seine-et-Marne, France
- Other name: Georges Félix François Léon Deneubourg
- Occupation: Actor
- Years active: 1912-1934 (film )

Georges Deneubourg (1860–1936) was a French stage and film actor.

== Selected filmography ==
- La Tosca (1908)
- Les Amours de la reine Élisabeth (1912)
- Mothers of France (1917)
- The Fall of the Romanoffs (1917)
- The Thirteenth Chair (1919)
- Tarnished Reputations (1920)
- Vidocq (1923)
- La gitanilla (1924)
- The Thruster (1924)
- I Have Killed (1924)
- The Abbot Constantine (1925)
- Prince Jean (1928)
- In Old Stamboul (1928)
- The Farewell Waltz (1928)
- The Crime of Sylvestre Bonnard (1929)
- The Ladies in the Green Hats (1929)
- Cagliostro (1929)
- The Eaglet (1931)
- Ronny (1931)
- Make a Living (1931)
- Tossing Ship (1932)
- The Beautiful Adventure (1932)
- Broken Wings (1933)
- Madame Bovary (1934)

== Bibliography ==
- Goble, Alan. The Complete Index to Literary Sources in Film. Walter de Gruyter, 1999.
