= Tarnished Reputations =

1920 film

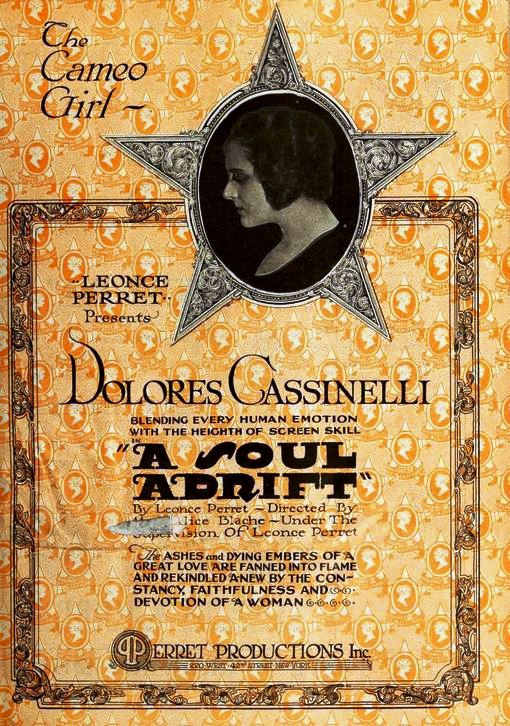
- Advertisement using the film's working title
- Directed by: Alice Guy-Blaché
- Written by: Jean Durand (scenario); Léonce Perret (screenplay)
- Starring: Dolores Cassinelli; Alan Roscoe; Georges Deneubourg
- Cinematography: Harry D. Harde
- Production company: Perret Productions Inc.
- Distributed by: Pathé Exchange
- Release date: March 14, 1920
- Running time: 5 reels
- Country: United States
- Language: Silent (English intertitles)

Tarnished Reputations is a 1920 American silent drama film directed by Alice Guy-Blaché (which is her last), supervised by Léonce Perret and starring Dolores Cassinelli, Alan Roscoe, and Georges Deneubourg. It is presumed to be a lost film.

== Plot ==
As described in a film magazine, Helen Sanderson has become infatuated with Robert Williams, a painter who has come to her small village. While painting The Saint Among the Lillies in which Helen is the model, their friendship develops into love. Helen receives a rude awakening when Robert suddenly departs, leaving only a letter to say goodbye. After the death of her aunt, Helen goes to New York to see her sweetheart after he has found fame with his painting, but finds that he has departed for Europe to paint a portrait of the Pope. In financial straits, Helen goes to a garment shop to make a living. One night she is wrongly accused of accosting a man, and is sentenced to jail for thirty days. After her release, she visits Judge Princeton from her case. There she meets author George de Wendbourg, who offers aid. He takes her home and develops her into a great actress in his play. Robert then returns from Europe and her love for him returns.

== Cast ==
- Dolores Cassinelli as Helen Sanderson
- Alan Roscoe as Robert Williams (credited as Albert Roscoe)
- Georges Deneubourg as George de Wendbourg
- Ned Burton as Judge Princeton

== Production ==
The film began production in November 1918 at Metro Studios, with no title selected for the film. Alice Guy-Blache said that all the titles that she had applied for had been taken already, only gaining the working title A Soul Adrift upon completion in January 1919.

== Preservation ==
With no holdings located in archives, Tarnished Reputations is considered a lost film.
