= Pamela B. Green =

American film director and producer

Pamela Green
- Occupations: Film director, film producer, motion graphics producer
- Notable work: Be Natural: The Untold Story of Alice Guy-Blaché

Pamela B. Green is a two-time Emmy-nominated, award-winning American film director and producer known for her work in feature film titles and motion graphics. She is the director, writer, editor, and producer of the 2018 documentary Be Natural: The Untold Story of Alice Guy-Blaché. In 2020, she was awarded the Jane Mercer Researcher of the Year award at the FOCAL International awards for her work on Be Natural.

== PIC Collective ==
In 2005, Green co-founded PIC Collective, an audiovisual communications studio focused on entertainment and motion design. PIC Collective designs and produces content for motion pictures, television, and commercials, and has done main title sequences for over 100 feature films and for every major Hollywood studio. Since PIC Collective's founding, Green has creative-directed and produced main titles and marketing campaigns for The Kingdom, Twilight, The Cabin in the Woods, The Muppets, 42, and numerous others, as well as TV show packages for the Academy Awards, the Billboard Awards, the Critics’ Choice Awards, and the mini-documentary sequences for VH1ʼs Soul Divas: History of Soul Music.

The title sequence for The Kingdom was honored with a place on the Independent Film Channel's list “The 50 Greatest Opening Title Sequences of All Time”. PIC Collective was also awarded a 2013 Key Art Award in Audio/Visual Technique for the titles of The Wolverine.

On November 21, 2019, PIC Collective won Silver for a Clio Award in the category best Audio Visual Technique in Motion Graphics.

== Be Natural ==
In 2012, Green began working on Be Natural: The Untold Story of Alice Guy-Blaché, a feature-length documentary about the first female film director. Green produced, directed, wrote, and edited the documentary with executive producer Robert Redford. In 2013, Green and her team raised over $200,000 via Kickstarter to further fund the documentary.

In addition, Green was a recipient of the Sundance Institute Documentary Fund. The film premiered in the Official Selection of Cannes Classics 2018 and then had its North American premiere at the Telluride Film Festival, followed by the Deauville American Film Festival, New York Film Festival, and the BFI London film Festival. It was acquired by Zeitgeist Films in association with Kino Lorber and was released in theaters in April 2019. The film was well-received by most critics, with Deadline's Pete Hammond calling it "the Best Film In Cannes" and Katie Walsh for the Los Angeles Times calling it "illuminating". Be Natural was nominated by the Critics Choice Documentary Awards in the Best First Documentary Category. Be Natural was also awarded Best Documentary at the 2020 Vancouver International Women in Film Festival. On November 17, 2019, after a screening of the film at the Barrymore Film Center, the Fort Lee Film Commission awarded director Pamela B. Green with the Barrymore Film Center Alice Guy-Blaché Award and narrator Jodie Foster with the Barrymore Film Center Award.

Be Natural was nominated for five awards at the 2020 FOCAL International Awards and took home the prize for Best Use of Footage in a Cinematic Feature and the Jane Mercer Researcher of the Year Award.

In December, the film was named one of the 50 Best Films of 2020 in the UK by The Guardian.

Later in December, the film was named one of the 10 Best Documentaries in Peter Bradshaw's film picks of 2020.

In 2021, Be Natural was nominated for a Peabody Award.

== Legwork Collective ==
In 2018, Green founded Legwork Collective, a media company that focuses on telling inspiring and moving scripted and unscripted stories that bring overlooked figures to the forefront via film, television, and audio.

In 2020, Legwork Collective received a grant from The Redford Center to direct a nonpartisan Public Service Announcement encouraging young people to Take Action and Vote!

== Filmmaker ==
Green directed the 2008 short Compact Only, which was nominated for Best Short at the Milan International Film Festival, for the Audience Award in the Fresno Film Festival, Best Short at the Beverly Hills Shorts Festival, and for the Best Short at The Int'l Fest of Cinema and Technology. The film won Best Short at the Tallahassee Film Festival, Best Short at the Treasure Coast International Film Festival, Accolade Film Award Winner, Best Comedy Short at the Gone With the Film Festival, Winner Aloha Accolade Award Honolulu, and much more.

Green was a co-producer on the 2010 documentary Bhutto about the 11th Prime Minister of Pakistan, Benazir Bhutto.

In 2011, Green directed the music video for The Click Five's song “Don’t Let Me Go”, which was created in partnership with MTV EXIT and featured a message to raise awareness about human trafficking.

In 2012, Green directed a commercial for Super-Max Razors which starred actor Gerard Butler.

In 2012, Bhutto was nominated for an Emmy for Outstanding Continuing Coverage of a News Story – Long Form.

In 2014, Green was included in Saul Bass's book Anatomy of Film Design, listing her as being part of a "wholly digitally trained generation of title designers."

In 2014, Green was selected to serve as a juror for Excellence in Title Design category at the 2014 South by Southwest Film Festival.

In 2016, Green directed an Audi commercial.

In 2016, Green was selected to serve as a judge for The Motion Awards for motionographer.com.

In 2018, Green's documentary Be Natural: The Untold Story of Alice Guy-Blaché premiered at Cannes.

In 2020, Green directed the nonpartisan PSA, Take Action and Vote! for the Redford Center.

In 2021, Green's documentary Be Natural: The Untold Story of Alice Guy-Blaché was nominated for a Peabody Award.

In 2021, Be Natural was nominated for an Emmy for Outstanding Research: Documentary.

Green is currently working on a feature biopic script about the mother of cinema, Alice Guy-Blaché, which will feature new material not seen in the documentary Be Natural.

Green has also developed Aces Never Sleep, a female-driven detective series, with Jamie Wolf's Foothill Productions and former CAA agent John Ptak, and they are in talks with different financiers. The series takes place during a pandemic, social unrest, economic crisis, racism and a polarized America. Kate Warn and her team of lady operatives are behind the true origins of the Pinkerton Detective Agency, founded by fervent abolitionist Allan Pinkerton. Historical figures appear throughout the series, including Frederick Douglass and Abraham Lincoln, notably when the agency's most valued Ace Kate Warn and fellow detectives thwart an assassination attempt on the President-Elect.

In 2022, Green did a kickstarter campaign for Ask The Question, a biopic about Ben A Barres.

In 2025, Be Natural was on the New York Times list of " The Movies we've loved since 2000" https://www.nytimes.com/interactive/2025/movies/best-movies-since-2000.html?smid=nytcore-ios-share&referringSource=articleShare

== Awards and accolades ==
Year	Award	Category	Role	Result
2021	News and Documentary Emmy Awards	Outstanding Research: Documentary	Director, Researcher	Nominated
2021	Peabody Awards	Arts	Director, producer	Nominated
2020	Bangkok International Documentary Awards	Best Feature Documentary	Director, producer	Won
2020	Monadnock International Film Festival	Best Documentary Feature	Director, producer	Won
2020	FOCAL International Film Festival	Best Use of Footage in a Cinematic Feature for Be Natural Jane Mercer Researcher of the Year Award for Be Natural	Director, Researcher	Won
2020	FOCAL International Film Festival	Best Use of Footage in an Arts Production for Be Natural Best Use of Footage in a History Feature for Be Natural Student Jury Award for Be Natural	Director, Researcher	Nominated
2020	Vancouver International Women in Film Festival	Best Documentary for Be Natural	Director, producer	Won
2020	Filmmor Film Festival Audience Award	Best Documentary for Be Natural	Director, producer	Nominated
2020	International Filmmor Women's Film Festival	Best Documentary Feature for Be Natural	Director, producer	Nominated
2019	Clio Entertainment Award Silver Prize	Best Audio-Visual Technique in Motion Graphics for Be Natural	Director, producer	Won
2019	Critics' Choice Award	Best First Documentary Feature for Be Natural	Director, producer	Nominated
2018	Cannes Film Festival L'Oeil D'Or	Documentary for Be Natural	Director, producer	Nominated
2018	ADC Merit Award	Motion / Film Craft for Be Natural	Director, producer	Won
2013	Key Art Award	Audio Visual Technique for the titles of The Wolverine		Won
2012	Emmy	Outstanding Continuing Coverage of a News Story for Bhutto	Producer	Nominated
2012	Peabody Awards	Area of Excellence	Co-producer	Won
2009	Milano International Film Festival Awards	Best Narrative Short for Compact Only	Director, producer	Nominated
2009	Best of Fest Treasure Coast International Film Festival	Best Editing for Compact Only	Director, producer, editor	Won

== Selected filmography ==
Year	Film/Television Show	Role
2023	Creepers	Opening Sequence and Internal Book Sequences
2023	On Sacred Ground	Creative Director, Titles and Internal Sequences
2023	Quasi	Title Design
2023	Wolf Pack	Creative Director, Titles
2022	Easter Sunday	Title Design
2022	Inheritance	Creative Director, Titles
2022	Love & Gelato	Title Design
2022	Heartland	Creative Director, Titles and Graphics
2021	Missing and Murdered in Montana	Creative Director, Titles and Graphics
2021	Mission Joy	Creative Director, Titles and Graphics
2021	Painkiller	Creative Director, Titles
2021	The Good House	Creative Director, Titles
2020	Big Sky	Creative Director, Show Open
2020	Take Action and Vote PSA	Director/Producer, editor
2020	Kiss the Ground	Creative Director, Graphics & co-Producer
2020	Let's Scare Julie	Creative Director, Titles
2020	Madame CJ Walker	Title Design
2020	Don't Look Deeper	Title Design
2019	Black Lightning	Title Design
2019	Live PD Wanted	Title Design
2019	Animal ER Live	Title Design
2019	The Buddy Games	Creative Director/Producer, Titles
2018	Be Natural: The Untold Story of Alice Guy-Blaché	Director, co-writer, producer, editor
2018	Elseworlds: Supergirl	Creative Director/Producer, Titles
2018	Elseworlds: The Flash	Creative Director/Producer, Titles
2018	All American	Title Design
2018	Saint Judy	Creative Director/Producer, Titles
2018	I Feel Bad	Title Design
2018	You	Title Design
2018	God Friended Me	Title Design
2018	Quantico	Title Design
2018	Live PD Presents PD Cam	Creative Director, Graphics
2018	Benji	Creative Director, Title
2018	Blindspotting	Title Design
2017	Geostorm	Creative Director/Producer, Titles
2017	Rings	Creative Director/Producer, Titles
2017	Crown Heights	Title Design
2016	A Cinderella Story: If The Shoe Fits	Creative Director, Titles
2016	Jason Bourne	Creative Director, Titles
2016	The Crossroads of History	Creative Director, Title Design
2015	Victor Frankenstein	Titles, Graphics
2015	Soaked in Bleach	Creative Director/Producer, Titles
2015	Hot Tub Time Machine 2	Creative Director/Producer, Titles
2014	The Oscars Red Carpet Live	Creative Director/Producer
2014	Mozart in the Jungle	Title Design
2014	Klondike	Title Design
2013	Homefront	Creative Director/Producer, Titles
2013	American Mustang	Opening Sequence
2013	Last Vegas	Creative Director/Producer, Titles
2013	2013 MTV Movie Awards	Creative Director, Trailblazer, Generation Award Package
2013	42	Title Design
2012	2012 MTV Movie Awards	Creative Director/Producer, Generation Award Package
2012	The Cabin in the Woods	Co-Creative Director, Titles
2012	Safe House	Co-Creative Director/Producer, Titles
2011	The Muppets	Creative Director/Producer, Main/End Titles
2011	The 2011 Billboard Music Awards	Graphics
2011	Red Riding Hood	Creative Director, Main/End Titles
2011	The 83rd Annual Academy Awards	Creative Director/Producer, Show Graphics
2010	Let Me In	Producer, Titles
2010	Killers	Co-Creative Director, Titles
2010	Bhutto	Co-Producer
2009	G.I. Joe: Rise of the Cobra	Producer, Main Titles/Visual Effects/Graphic Effects
2009	Push	Producer, Main Titles
2008	Twilight	Producer, Titles
2008	Sex and the City	Producer, Main Titles
2007	Lions for Lambs	Producer, Main/End Titles
2007	The Kingdom	Producer, Main Titles
2006	The Illusionist	Title Designer, Main Titles
2006	Madea's Family Reunion	Producer, Main Titles
2005	Serenity	Producer, Main Titles
2005	The Perfect Man	Producer, Main Titles
2004	The Bourne Supremacy	Producer, Main/End Titles
2004	Under the Tuscan Sun	Producer, Main/End Titles

== See also ==
- Alice Guy-Blaché
