= What Will People Say? =

1916 silent film by Alice Guy

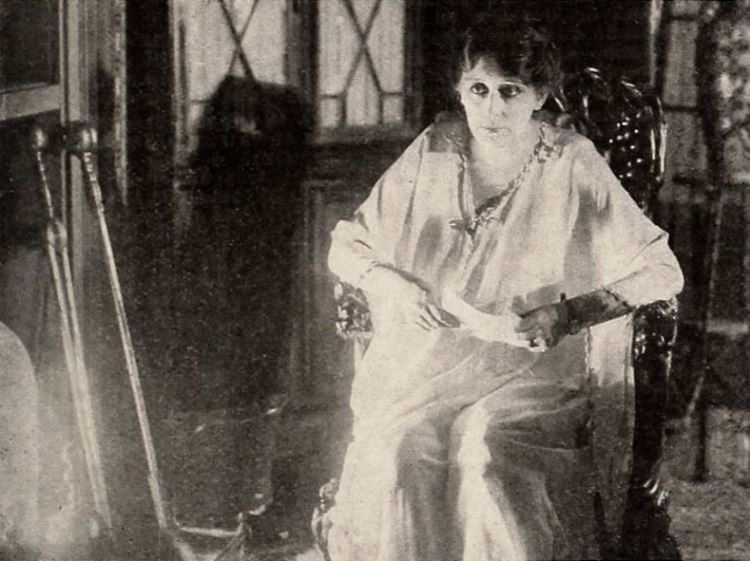
- Olga Petrova in What Will People Say?
- Directed by: Alice Guy
- Based on: Novel by Rupert Hughes
- Produced by: Herbert Blaché; Alice Guy
- Production companies: Popular Plays and Players Inc.
- Distributed by: Metro Pictures Corporation
- Release date: January 3, 1916 (U.S.)
- Running time: 5 reels
- Country: United States
- Language: Silent (English intertitles)

What Will People Say? is a 1916 American silent, black-and-white film directed by film pioneer Alice Guy, produced by Herbert Blaché, and starring Olga Petrova.

== Cast ==
- Olga Petrova as Persis Cabot
- Fritz De Lint as Harvey Forbes
- Fraunie Fraunholz as Willie Enslee
- Jean Thomas as Zoe Potter
- Charles Dungan as Senator Tate
- Zadee Burbank as Mrs. Neff
- Marilyn Reid as Alice Neff
- Elenore Sutter as Michette
- William A. Morse as Murray Ten Eycke
- John Dudley as James Cabot
