= The Farewell Waltz (1928 film) =

1928 film

- German poster
- Directed by: Henry Roussel
- Starring: Pierre Blanchar; Marie Bell; Georges Deneubourg
- Production company: Société des Films Historiques
- Distributed by: Exclusivités Jean de Merly
- Release date: 22 December 1928
- Country: France
- Languages: Silent; French intertitles

The Farewell Waltz (French: La valse de l'adieu) is a 1928 French silent biographical film directed by Henry Roussel and starring Pierre Blanchar, Marie Bell and Georges Deneubourg. The film's sets were designed by the art director Lucien Jaquelux.

== Main cast ==
- Pierre Blanchar as Frédéric Chopin
- Marie Bell as Maria Wodzińska
- Georges Deneubourg as Józef Elsner
- René Maupré as le comte Józef Skarbek
- Germaine Laugier as George Sand
- Jane Irys as Marie d'Agoult
- Georgette Sorelle as la comtesse Wodzińska
- Serge Chatsky as le comte Antoine Wodziński
- Jacques Maury as Franz Liszt
- Zofia Zajączkowska as Delfina Potocka

== Bibliography ==
- Charles Timbrell. Prince of Virtuosos: A Life of Walter Rummel, American Pianist. Scarecrow Press, 2005.
