= National Center for Film and Video Preservation =

The National Center for Film and Video Preservation was established in 1984 by the American Film Institute and the National Endowment for the Arts to

- coordinate American moving image preservation activities on a national scale serving as Secretariat for the Association of Moving Image Archivists and The Film Foundation.
- implement the National Moving Image Database.
- research and publish the AFI Catalog of Feature Films.
- locate and acquire films and television programs for inclusion in the AFI Collection to be preserved at the Library of Congress and other archives.
- establish ongoing relationships between the public archives and the film and television industry.
- create broader public awareness of preservation needs.

The center has a list of wanted films believed to be lost. Some of the films on that list are

- Cleopatra (1917)
- The Divine Woman (1928)
- Camille (1927)

== See also ==
- List of lost films
- List of incomplete or partially lost films
