= François Arnaud =

François Arnaud may refer to:

- François Arnaud (actor) (born 1985), Canadian actor
- François Arnaud (ecclesiastic) (1721–1784), French ecclesiastic and academician
