= The Birth, the Life and the Death of Christ =

1906 French silent short film

- French: La vie du Christ
- Directed by: Alice Guy-Blaché
- Cinematography: Anatole Thiberville
- Production company: Gaumont
- Distributed by: Gaumont
- Release date: 1906
- Running time: 33 minutes
- Country: France

The Birth, the Life and the Death of Christ (French: La vie du Christ) is a 1906 French silent short film directed by Alice Guy-Blaché. The film is based on the traditional story of Jesus Christ as related in the Bible.

== Plot ==
The Birth, the Life and the Death of Christ (1906)

The film tells the life of Jesus Christ in 25 tableaux based on the canonical gospels:

1. Arrival in Bethlehem
2. Nativity and arrival of the Magi
3. The sleep of Jesus
4. The Samaritan
5. The miracle of Jairus's daughter
6. Mary Magdalene washes the feet of Jesus
7. Palm Sunday
8. The last supper
9. The olive garden
10. The night watch
11. Judas's betrayal
12. Jesus before Caiphus
13. The denial of St. Peter
14. Jesus before Pontius Pilatus
15. The torment
16. Ecce homo
17. The bearing of the cross
18. Jesus fall the first time
19. Saint Veronica
20. Climbing Golgotha
21. The crucifixion
22. The agony
23. Descending from the cross
24. Committed to the tomb
25. The resurrection

== Production and release ==
The film, shot partly in the Gaumont studios in the Buttes-Chaumont, and partly in the Fontainebleau forest near Paris, was directed by Alice Guy-Blaché, with sets and costumes designed by Victorin Jasset and Henri Menessier, inspired by engravings by James Tissot. As was the case with many films directed by Alice Guy, the film was for a long time wrongly attributed to Victorin Jasset, who was her assistant in charge of directing exterior scenes and managing the extras.

It was released in January 1906 in France and in the United States. The film was sold to the distributors either in individual scenes or as a full-length film.

== Analysis ==
Richard Abel notes that the principal distinction of the film is "its unique combination of realist and melodramatic elements", what he calls its "masculine" and "feminine" discourse. As example of the first characteristic, he mentions "the deliberate effort to achieve some measure of verisimilitude - through both shooting on location and using authentic props", while the second one results from the fact that the film "repeatedly insists on privileging women in relation to Jesus". Abel also stresses the cinematic techniques used by Guy, notably the use of cut-in medium shot in scene 19, Saint Veronica, or the ninety-degree pan in scene 20, Climbing Golgotha.

Carol A. Hebron concurs with Abel's opinion that Guy privileged women's relation to Jesus. She notes in particular that "The attendance of a large group of women around the foot of the cross implies their faithfulness in contrast to the male disciples' absence and lack of fidelity." She stresses that the use of outdoor location scenes "draw the audience into the experience, rather than being onlookers of a staged performance." She also appreciates the effective use of the dissolve technique, notably in scene 8, The Last Supper, to show how a terrified Judas has a vision of Jesus "half-naked (...) wearing a crown of thorns, holding a red scepter, and (bearing) the marks of crucifixion" with three angels behind him.

Gwendolyn Audrey Foster considers this film one of Guy's major accomplishments, "an ambitious spectacle that used lavish budgets, large crews, and hundred of extras". Guy "skillfully managed to incorporate scores of extras to give added depth to her work, the same way that (...) D.W. Griffith did a decade later in The Birth of a Nation and Intolerance." For her, the film highlights Guy's "role in the development of a hybrid cinema that questions notions of 'realism' and 'artifice' in gendered performativity". She finds that Guy took "a slightly feminist, though dominantly white and racist perspective" blending "spectacle and realism in an unprecedented manner. (...) the extreme stylisation of her vision (...) effectively creates an alternative universe in which the protagonists (...) seem enshrined by each of the carefully framed compositions." She also finds striking that in this film all blacks, with the exception of one of the three Magi, are negative figures: "blacks beat Jesus during the scourging and two black figures hold the cross that Jesus is to be nailed to." She concludes that "To the late-twentiest-century feminist, (Guy-Blaché's) feminism may seem to be a hybrid form of early white, middle-class feminism."

== See also ==
- List of Easter films
