= La Fée aux Choux =

1896 French lost film by Alice Guy-Blaché

- The 1900 version
- Directed by: Alice Guy
- Written by: Alice Guy
- Release dates: 1896; 1900; 1902
- Running time: 51 seconds (1896 and 1900)
- Country: France
- Language: Silent film

The 1896 version of La Fée aux Choux (The Fairy of the Cabbages) is a lost short fantasy film directed by Alice Guy-Blaché (then known as Alice Guy) that, according to her, featured a honeymoon couple, a farmer, pictures of babies glued to cardboard, and one live baby. The 1900 La Fée aux Choux and the 1902 Sage-Femme de Première Classe (originally titled La Fée aux Choux) are frequently confused with the original lost film, which is the first film directed by a woman.

Alice Guy-Blaché reported that she had to remake the film at least twice and this accounts for the two films dated 1900 and 1902 that are available to view online. Guy-Blaché's 1900 version employed one actress (the fairy), two live babies, and a number of dolls. Her 1902 version, later retitled Sage-femme de première classe (Midwife First Class), employed a honeymoon couple and a female baby merchant along with numerous babies and dolls. In a still photograph from the 1902 version, Guy-Blaché appears, wearing a "costume of Normandy". She does not play the husband in the film, but said that she "for fun" pulled on the peasant clothes for the photograph.

In the evidence that has been coming in piecemeal for over a century, there are multiple points of confirmation that there were three La Fée aux Choux and that the first was filmed in the spring and early summer of 1896.

== Original scenario ==
The scenario Alice Guy wrote for her first film begins with "a pair of newlyweds" walking in the fields during their honeymoon. "They come upon a field of cabbages where a farmer is working." Then "the young man leans into the ear of his young wife and asks if she would like a baby. She agrees, lowering her eyes…the young man asks permission of the farmer," who gives the couple permission to search his field. The young husband discovers a baby made of cardboard, but both he and his bride are disappointed in it. Then the young bride "hears a cooing behind a more distant cabbage. She runs and discovers a beautiful, live baby and brings it in triumph to her husband." After compensating the farmer, the newlyweds "leave excitedly" while the farmer returns to his field with a shrug.

This scenario has no fairy which has caused some confusion. Alice Guy explained in her memoirs: "As actors: my friends, a screaming baby, an anxious mother leaping to and fro into the camera focus, and my first film, La Fée aux Choux, was born." Since that one-minute length of film cost as much as Alice's salary for a week, she apparently decided not to reshoot after the mother jumped in. Since fairies do not like to be seen by mortal eyes, the leaping mother was a happy accident. Those in the audience who saw the 1896 original were charmed by the leaping mother who had appeared only for a few seconds at the end. Following this, the 1900 version is all about the fairy, dovetailing perfectly with the 1896 version and carrying forward the pleasant fantasy.

== Visit to baby incubator exposition ==
In February 1896, on the boulevard Poissonnière leading to the cabarets of Montmartre, Dr. Alexandre Lion opened an exposition, a "boutique fully operational," of baby incubators, filled with live, premature infants. The baby incubator was a new invention, modeled after chicken incubators, serving to keep the babies warm. An art nouveau poster was designed by Adolfo Hohenstein to advertise the Paris Couveuses d'Enfants. A nurse holding three babies is framed by a vine sprouting baby's heads in place of flowers. Faint white lines—drawings of babies growing on vines—fill in the background. Alice Guy went to this exposition and saw the babies in their enclosures. She later told her granddaughter, Regine Blaché-Bolton, that she was inspired to create La Fée aux Choux because she had seen the babies in the glass and metal boxes at an exposition.

== Photograph ==
There is a photo of Alice Guy standing between Yvonne and Germaine Sérand. "In the photo of La Fée aux Choux," Alice writes, "are my friends, Germaine and Yvonne Sérand…and myself." Yvonne played the fairy in the 1900 version; both Yvonne and Germaine played in the 1902 Sage-femme. Since Alice Guy called this photo La Fée aux Choux, there has been some confusion because the painted scene behind the three women is from Sage-femme.

Alice Guy claimed that she would never even have used the words Sage-femme. The newspapers of 1902 and 1903 support her claim. Sage-femme was titled La Fée aux Choux when it was released in December 1902. The title change came later in the September 1903 catalogue. Before the 1900 version of La Fée aux Choux was discovered by Alison McMahan in a Swedish archive in 1996, this photo was the basis for the theory that the 1902 Sage-femme was Alice Guy's debut film. The 1900 La Fée aux Choux, with a single character, challenged this assumption. It is also hard to argue that the 1900 La Fée aux Choux is a copy of Alice Guy's first film because it doesn't match her description either. It has no cardboard babies, no farmer, and its backdrop, which Alice Guy said "shivered in the wind," is secured by the fence standing on its lower edge.

Since Alice Guy reported that her 1896 La Fée aux Choux had to be remade at least twice, the most straight-forward explanation is that there was a third film that came first, and that the 1900 and 1902 versions are the remakes.

== Later events ==
Alice Guy repeatedly recounted that she was put in charge of production in 1897 after the success of the 1896 La Fée aux Choux. She writes that Léon Gaumont remodeled a residence for her on his property in Belleville to induce her to move six miles away from her delightful apartment on Quai Malaquais, about a mile from the Gaumont office. The City of Paris records Alice Guy's residence at Quai Malaquais from 1896 to 1898. She said she moved from there to Belleville. In February 1897, Léon Gaumont obtained a permit to remodel 14, rue Alouettes, "pavilion pour concierge," for an employee or caretaker of the property. Thus, two government records support Alice Guy's accounts.

== Sage-femme de Première Classe ==
Sage-femme de première classe (1902), a similarly-themed film by Alice Guy

Sage-femme de Première Classe is pointed to by some archivists and historians as Alice Guy's first film, but Sage-femme doesn't correspond to her descriptions. There are three characters in Sage-femme, but four characters in Alice's descriptions of the 1896 La Fée aux Choux, including a couple, a male farmer, children in costume, and a mother who "leaped into the field of focus." Alice Guy said she couldn't "remember the name of the man who played the farmer" in the 1896 La Fée aux Choux. But there are no male players in either Sage-femme or the 1900 La Fée aux Choux.

== Fan painting ==
Alice Guy reported that the backdrop for her 1896 original La Fée aux Choux was painted by a ladies' fan-painter. Pamela Green's research for Be Natural, The Untold Story of Alice Guy-Blaché, turned up a hand-painted ladies' fan that was given to Alice Guy as a gift. It was signed by René Sérand (Yvonne Mugnier-Sérand's older brother). The painting on the fan looks like René Sérand painted it to commemorate the 1896 La Fée aux Choux. A woman, her arms in the air, is surrounded by little ones. A young woman approaches her from the right. This painting fits the descriptions Alice Guy gave for her first film: "We got the kids all dressed up," "the mother leaped into the field of focus," and the bride "ran to a distant part of the cabbage field."

== Use of 58-millimeter film ==
Neither the 1900 nor the 1902 version has a bride running to a "distant part of the cabbage field" or a woman jumping into the field of focus. The words "running" and "distant" suggest the 1896 version was shot on a larger format film, such as the 58-millimeter which allowed for a scene in wide-screen.

== Catalogue entries ==
There are three Gaumont catalogue entries that correspond to 1) Alice Guy's 1896 descriptions, 2) the 1900 version of La Fée aux Choux, and 3) the 1902 Sage-Femme. The first entry Alice Guy supplied to Victor Bachy and fits the 1896 version, but doesn't fit either the 1900 or 1902 remake:

"A loving couple walks through a vegetable garden in search of a baby. A fairy deposits live babies which she then removes from the cabbages to the delight of the young couple who are overjoyed."

This catalogue that Alice Guy had in her possession appears to be lost because the earliest description we have is from the 1901 Gaumont catalogue which carries the following description and fits the 1900 version:

"A fairy deposits live babies which she then removes from the cabbages. Very big success." The text of this description appears to have been abbreviated from the previous text that Alice Guy gave to Victor Bachy. It uses the exact same words, but the phrases about the young couple are deleted. Sage-femme, released in December 1902, got a much more detailed description, two paragraphs long, in the September 1903 Gaumont catalogue.

== Georges Sadoul and Henry Gallet ==
Henry Gallet, when he was interviewed in the mid-1940s, told Georges Sadoul that La Fée aux Choux was "his first film." Georges Sadoul misinterpreted this to mean that Henry Gallet directed La Fée aux Choux. Henry Gallet, on seeing Sadoul's error, contacted him to correct it. In a later edition, Sadoul added a footnote to the text that said Henry Gallet "was content to be the actor of the films made by Alice Guy, who claims all the Gaumont production in the early years." Since neither the 1900 La Fée aux Choux nor the 1902 Sage-femme had any male actors, only the 1896 version can fulfill this specific detail. Henry Gallet lived near the Gaumont property at his parents' house until at least 1900, and was only 19 in 1896. He most likely played the young husband.

== Subtitle ==
There are only two or three films before 1900 in the Gaumont catalogue that have a subtitle. La Fee aux Choux ou La Naissance des Enfants in 1900 is one of them. The Lumière films that were shown on December 28, 1895, and in the months that followed, took their titles from the action in the film: Arrival of a Train at La Ciotat, Workers Leaving the Lumière Factory, etc. These titles were purely descriptive. There was no artistic consideration given to the titles of the earliest films. Alice Guy likely followed this pattern, giving her first film a descriptive title such as La Naissance des Enfants, and then she added an artistic title for the 1900 version, and kept the earlier title as a subtitle because it referred to the first version.

== Newspaper reference ==
There is a reference in the July 30, 1896 edition of the newspaper Gil Blas, that refers to a "chaste fiction of children born under the cabbages in a wonderfully framed chromo landscape" that requires explanation.

== Backdrop ==
Photographic evidence of the 1896 La Fée aux Choux can be found in seven extant Gaumont films. When the painted panels from these films are put together, the size of the backdrop, at least 40 feet long, indicates it was painted for a larger format film such as the 58-millimeter that was used at Gaumont only in 1896 and the first half of 1897. Portions from the 1896 backdrop appear in both the 1900 La Fée aux Choux and behind the door in Sage-femme.

Some of the panels connect along their edges and some are connected by specifics in the painting. One of the witnesses of the painted backdrop said it was used for Les Mefaits d'une Tête de Veau. Based on the figures of the Normandy wedding in the painting, it was used for La Fée aux Choux first.
