= Charles Mayol =

French music publisher

- Born: Charles-Félix-Eustache Mayol; 21 September 1863; Toulon
- Died: 16 March 1910 (aged 46); Paris
- Other name: Music publisher

Charles Mayol (21 September 1863 – 16 March 1910) was a French music publisher.

The elder brother of the singer Félix Mayol, Charles-Félix-Eustache Mayol established the éditions Mayol, originally created to publish the songs of his brother and those performed by the artists of the Concert Mayol, entertainment venue Felix Mayol bought in 1909. Charles Mayol requested accession to the SACEM 18 September 1908.

The publishing company had two addresses in Paris:

1. 4, rue Martel, 10th arrondissement of Paris
2. 18, rue du Faubourg-Saint-Martin, 10th arrondissement

== Bibliography ==
- Anik Devriès and François Lesure, Dictionnaire des éditeurs de musique français. Vol. II 1820 à 1914 (published with the help of the SACEM, éd. Monkoff (Geneva), 1988 1st éd. 1979) ISBN 2-8266-0461-9
