= Léon Gaumont =

French inventor, engineer and industrialist (1864–1946)

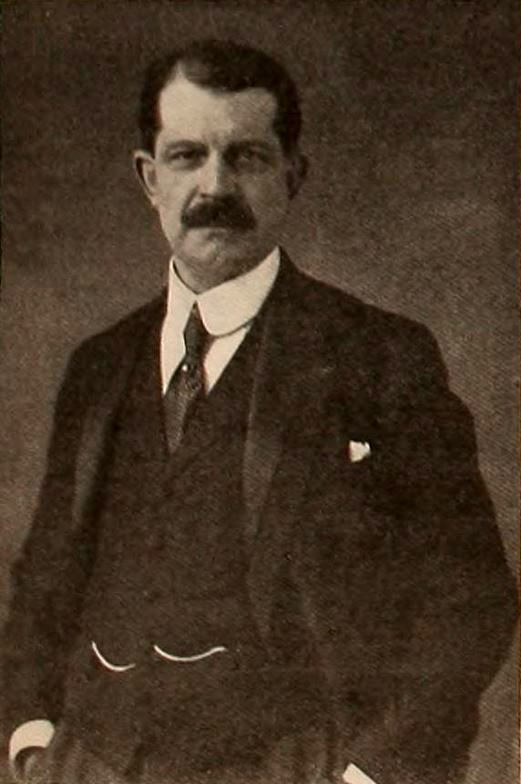
- Gaumont in June 1920
- Born: Léon Ernest Gaumont; 10 May 1864; Paris, France
- Died: 10 August 1946 (aged 82); Sainte-Maxime, France
- Resting place: Cimetière de Belleville
- Occupations: Engineer, inventor, film maker
- Years active: 1893–1945
- Spouse: Camille Louise Maillard

Léon Ernest Gaumont (French: [leɔ̃ ɡomɔ̃]; 10 May 1864 – 10 August 1946) was a French inventor, engineer, and industrialist who was a pioneer of the motion picture industry. He founded the world's oldest operating film studio, Gaumont, and worked in partnership with Solax Studios.

== Biography ==
Léon Ernest Gaumont, born in Paris was gifted with a mechanical mind which led him to employment manufacturing precision instruments. From early childhood, he was fascinated by the technique of photography. When he was offered a job at the Comptoir géneral de photographie in 1893, he jumped at the opportunity. His decision proved fortunate when two years later he was given the chance to acquire the business. In August 1895, he partnered with the astronomer Joseph Vallot, the famous engineer Gustave Eiffel, and the financier Alfred Besnier to make the purchase. Their business entity, called L. Gaumont et Cie, has survived in one form or another to become the world's oldest surviving film company extant. The company logo was the distinctive "Marguerite" (named after his mother), a type of flower similar to the daisy. The company had extensive studios (Cité Elgé) in the Buttes-Chaumont District of Paris, and a smaller operation in Nice, France.

Leon Gaumont was married to Camille Louise Maillard (1860-1933) on 4 June 1888. They had five children: Charles, Jeanne, Raymond, Helene, and Louis.

Léon Gaumont's company sold camera equipment and film, but in 1897 inaugurated a motion picture production business. Initially, Gaumont made films for the picture arcade business such as those operated by the Lumière brothers, but it was under the direction of Alice Guy (Gaumont's secretary - First Woman Film Director), that they began making short films based on narrative scripts. Louis Feuillade (Judex, Les Vampires, Fantômas) was to follow as the Studio Director when Guy left for Fort, Lee, New Jersey in 1912, where she subsequently opened her own production company—Solax Studios— and it was then that Gaumont rapidly expanded the business into cinematographic equipment for amateurs. Within a few years, Gaumont's company ranked second only to Pathé Frères in the field of French Cinema. In 1903, Gaumont was granted patents for his Chronophonographe and loudspeaker system designed to work with his sound-on-disc talking pictures: the chronophone. The Etablissements Gaumont was founded in 1906 to handle film production and distribution, plus to operate a chain of movie theaters, including the giant Gaumont Palace (1912) (Place Clichy - former "Hippodrome") in Paris (largest in the world at the time - 6,000 seats). By 1910 Léon Gaumont had improved his synchronous sound invention to the point where he was able to provide enough volume to be heard by up to 4000 people in a theater. In 1912, Gaumont developed a color process for film.

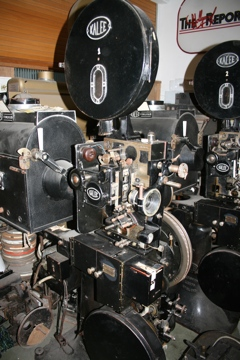
1930's Gaumont Kalee film Projector, Cinema Museum London

As one of the two dominant forces in film in all of Europe (the other being Charles Pathé), World War I profoundly affected Leon Gaumont's business fortunes. He hired over 300 additional employees, in spite of the fact that Nitrate Emulsion film stocks dwindled because of the need for nitro-cellulose in the munitions industry. Nevertheless, before retiring in 1930, he had built one of the most important film companies in cinema history.

Upon his retirement to Provence, a restructuring of corporate ownership took place through financing provided by the Banque Nationale de Crédit and with a capital stock issue in the name of a new company called Gaumont-Franco-Film-Aubert. Four years later, a scandal erupted following the collapse of the Banque Nationale de Crédit, and Gaumont-Franco-Film-Aubert was forced to file for bankruptcy protection.

== Death and legacy ==
Léon Gaumont died on 10 August 1946 in Sainte-Maxime-sur-Mèr, in the Provence-Alpes-Côte d'Azur region of France, and was buried in the Cimetière de Belleville in Paris. In 1995, on the 100th anniversary of French film, a commemorative silver 100 Franc coin was issued with Léon Gaumont's image.
