= A Fool and His Money (1912 film) =

- Directed by: Alice Guy-Blaché
- Release date: October 11, 1912
- Country: United States
- Language: Silent

A Fool and His Money is an American silent comedy film from 1912. It is either the first film or one of the earliest films with an all African-American cast. It was directed by Alice Guy-Blaché, who is widely considered the first female film director. The plot involves a man who becomes suddenly wealthy, takes on an aristocratic lifestyle, and becomes engaged to a woman, Lindy, who had scorned him when he was poor. He soon loses his money to a card shark who immediately wins the affection of his fiancée.

Sam Jones, the film's main character, is played by James Russell. No other actors are credited for their roles.

The film was rediscovered by California engineer David Navone, who found four reels of early 1910s films in a trunk he purchased at an estate sale. He gave them to the American Film Institute (AFI). It was preserved by the AFI's National Center for Film and Video Preservation at the Library of Congress Motion Picture Conservation Center. It was shown publicly on July 29, 2018, at Grauman's Egyptian Theatre in Los Angeles.
