= Chronophone =

Early sound-on-disc cinema sound system

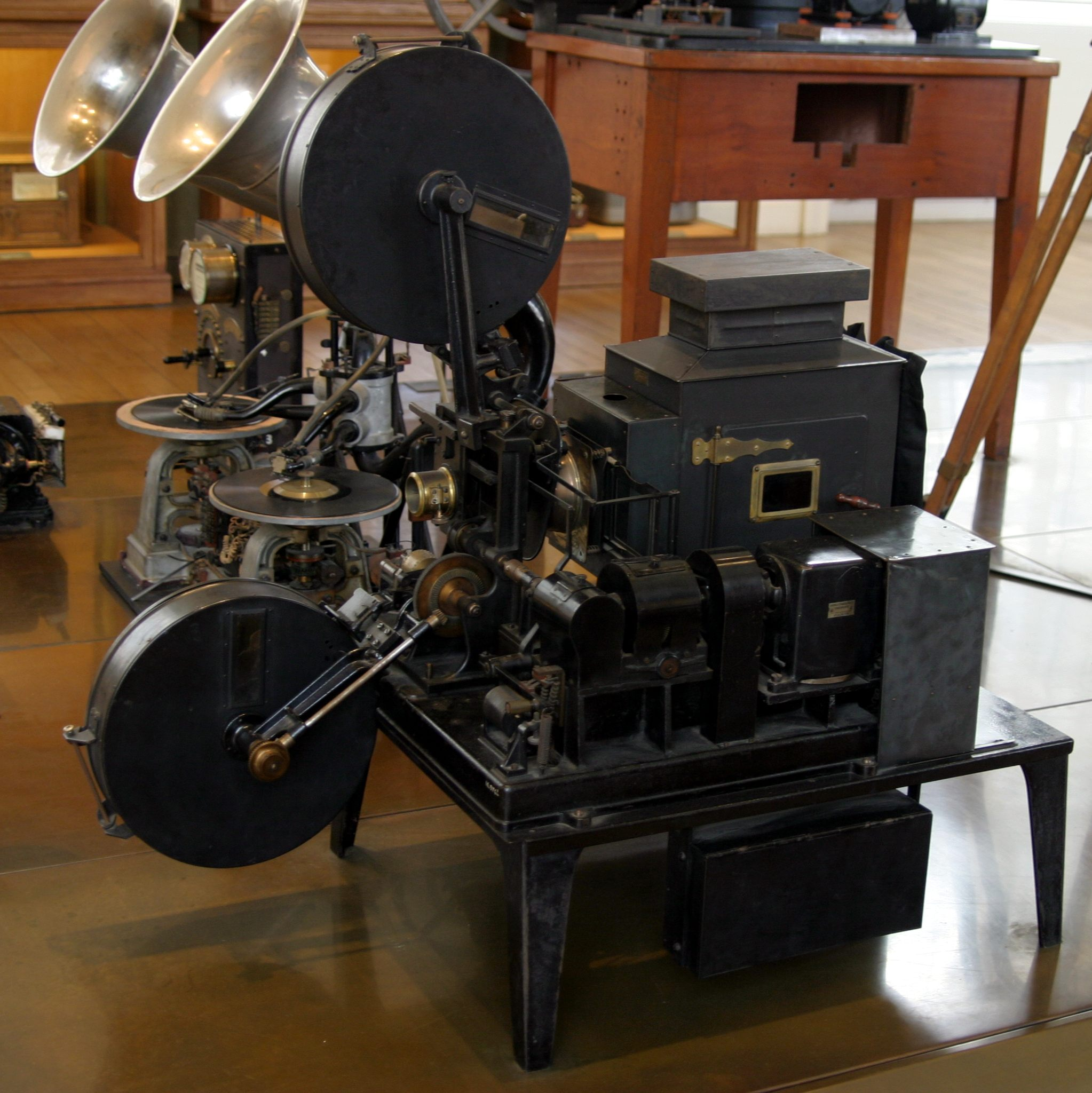
Gaumont 35mm projector with audio section in background.

The Chronophone is an apparatus patented by Léon Gaumont in 1902 to synchronise the Cinématographe (Chrono-Bioscope) with a disc Phonograph (Cyclophone) using a "Conductor" or "Switchboard". This sound-on-disc display was used as an experiment from 1902 to 1910. In January 1911, the industrial exploitation started at the Olympia. Chronophone would show Phonoscènes (an early forerunner of music videos) and films parlants ("Talking Films") almost every week from 1911 until 1917 at the Gaumont Palace, "the Greatest Cinema Theatre in the World", previously known as the Paris Hippodrome.

A later version of the Chonophone was known as a Chronomegaphone.

A Chronophone is preserved in the collection of the Musée des Arts et Métiers, another is in the collection of the George Eastman Museum, and a Chromomegaphone is owned by Gaumont.

In the United States, the early rival of the Chronophone was the Cameraphone, which included a Graphophone with a type of mechanical sound amplifier known as a Higham-A-Phone reproducer.

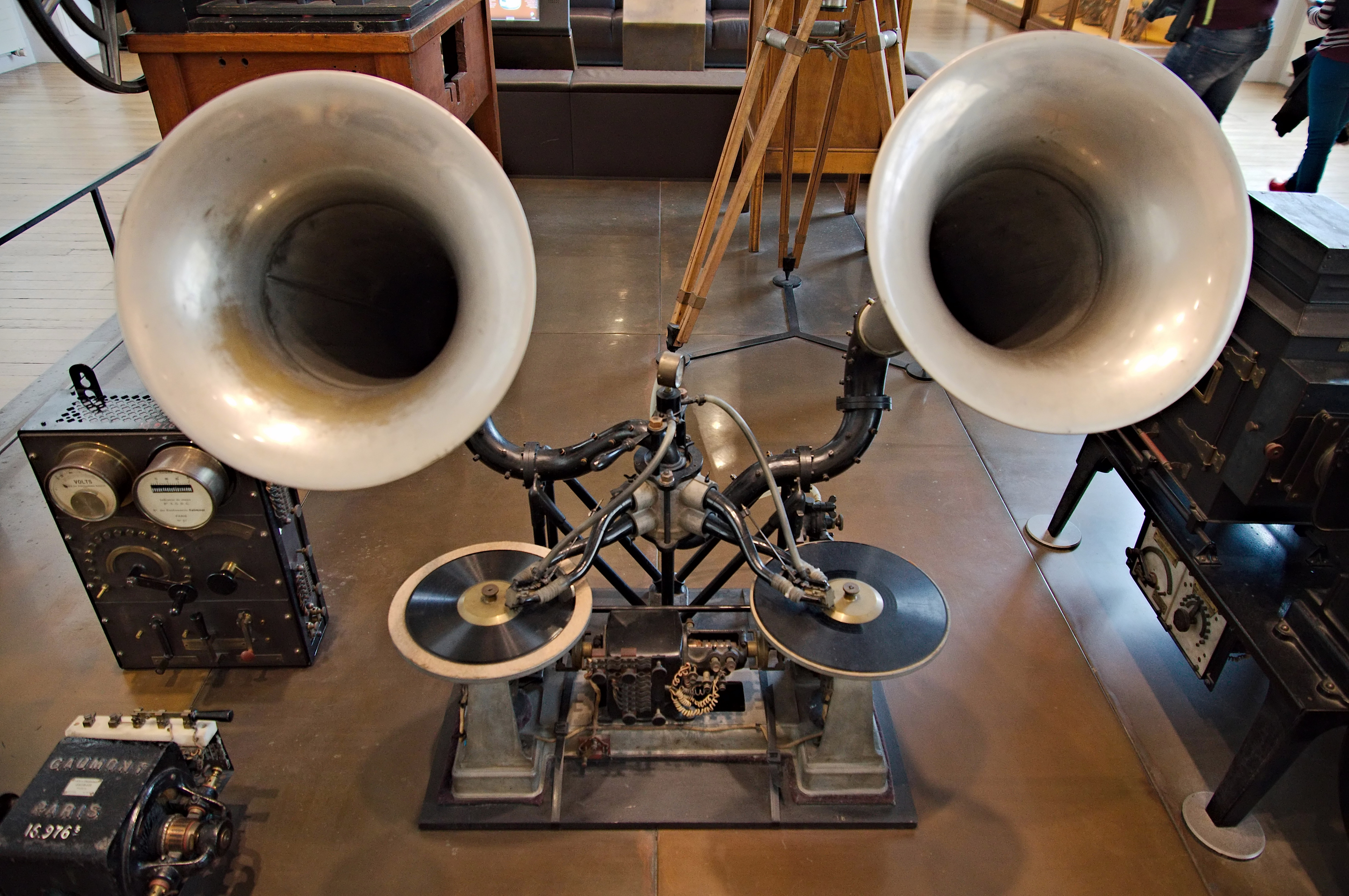
Audio equipment of a Chronophone.
