= Solax Studios =

American motion-picture studio

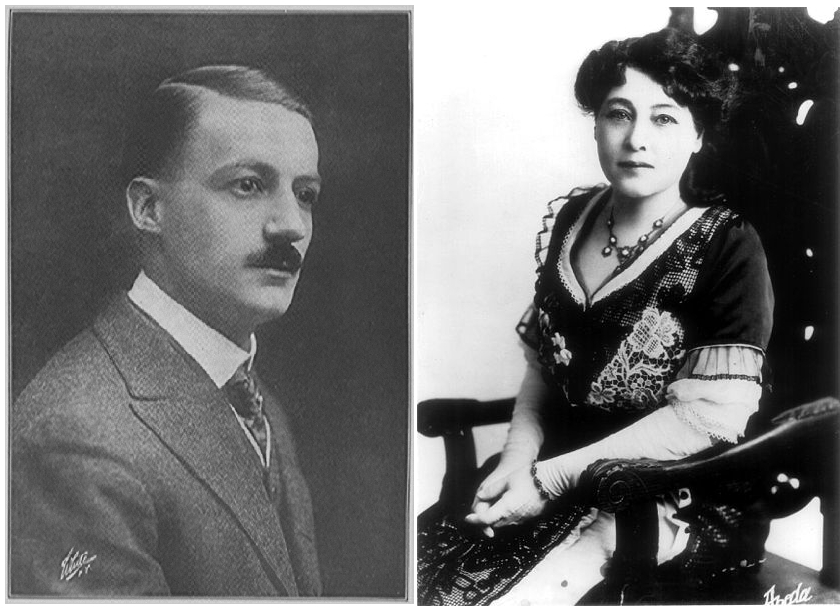
Herbert and Alice Guy-Blaché

Solax Studios was an American motion-picture studio founded in 1910 by executives from Gaumont of France: Alice Guy-Blaché, her husband Herbert, and a third partner, George A. Magie. It was established as the Solax Company.

Guy-Blaché was artistic director and the director for many of the studio's films, while her husband Herbert managed production for the new company. They took over the studio Gaumont had built in Flushing, New York, in 1908 for the production of Chronophone sound films, a venture which proved unsuccessful for Gaumont. Solax produced silent films in Flushing from October 1910 to the summer of 1912. Prospering, Solax invested more than $100,000 in a modern production plant in 1912 in Fort Lee, New Jersey, which had become the center of America's first motion picture industry.

This was a time when the American film industry was rapidly changing from little more than a scientific curiosity to an important sector of the economic engine driving the economy. In this environment, Solax was conceived as an all-in-one operation with its own film processing laboratory and state of the art stages built under a glass roof. In addition to administrative offices, production facilities included dressing rooms, a set-fabrication workshop, and a costume-design department with a sewing room.

In 1912, the studio made a short film titled A Fool and His Money, directed by Guy-Blaché. It is believed to be the first film ever made with an all–African-American cast. The film is now at the National Center for Film and Video Preservation at the American Film Institute.

Metro Pictures (now MGM) began its business life in 1916 primarily as a distributor of successful Solax films. Several emerging stars appeared in Solax films including Lionel and Ethel Barrymore, Claire Whitney, Olga Petrova, and Billy Quirk.

In between their own productions, the Blachés leased the studios to other production companies such as the Goldwyn Picture Corporation and Selznick International Pictures. Inadequate firefighting methods resulted in the destruction of Solax Film Laboratories in Fort Lee, New Jersey, in 1919.

Solax and the rest of the East Coast film industry rapidly declined throughout the 1920s as a result of the phenomenal growth of motion-picture facilities in Hollywood, California, that offered lower costs and a climate that accommodated year-round filming.

== Filmography ==
- Brennan of the Moor (1913)
