= The Road to Reno =

The Road to Reno is the title of two films:

- The Road to Reno (1931 film), a drama
- The Road to Reno (1938 film), a screwball comedy
