= The Unfair Sex =

1926 film by Henri Diamant-Berger

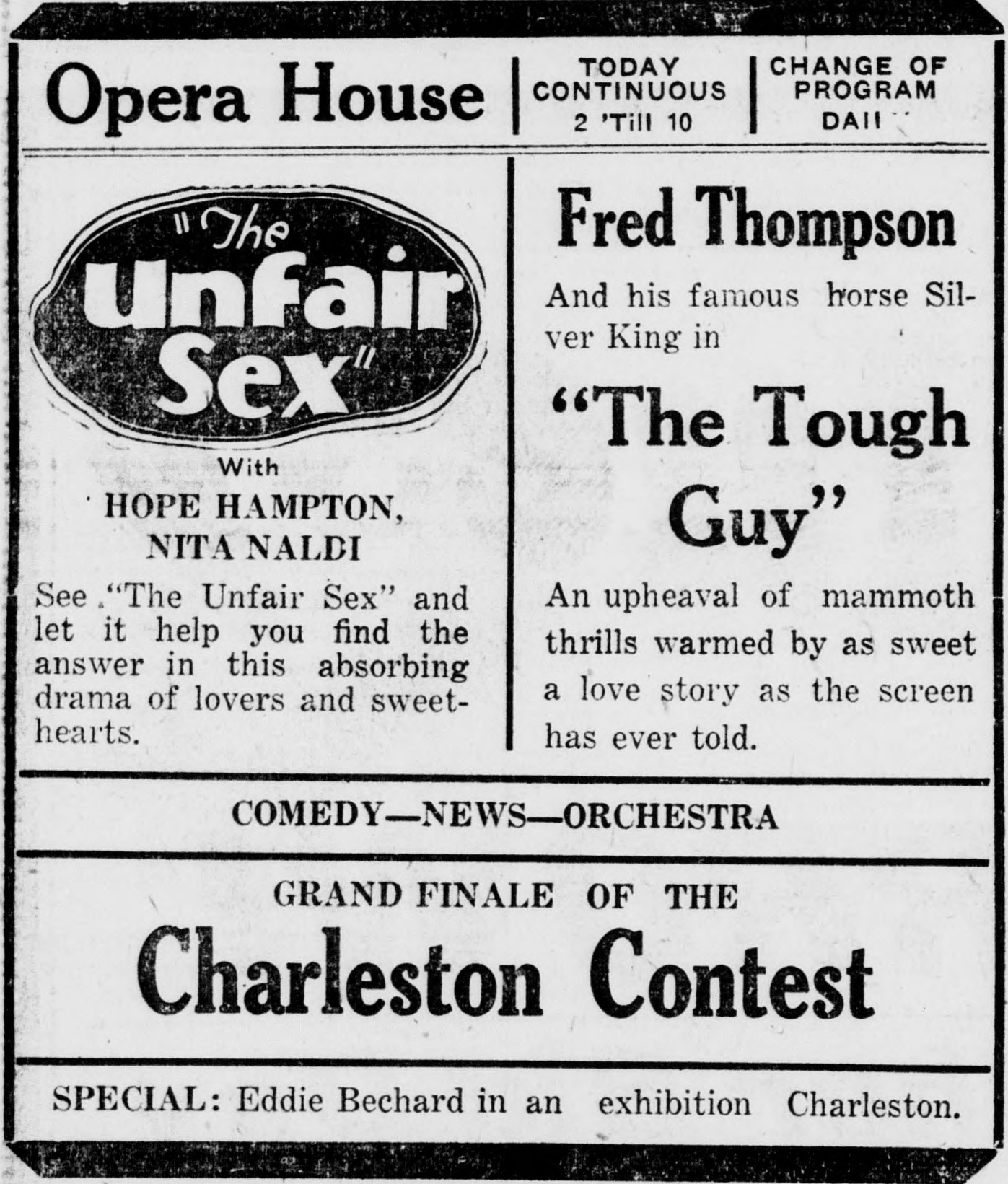
- Contemporary advertisement
- Directed by: Henri Diamant-Berger
- Written by: Arthur Hoerl; Eugene Walter
- Starring: Hope Hampton; Holbrook Blinn; Nita Naldi
- Cinematography: Alfred Ortlieb
- Production company: Diamant Film Company of America
- Distributed by: Associated Exhibitors
- Release date: April 17, 1926
- Country: United States
- Languages: Silent; English intertitles

The Unfair Sex is a 1926 American silent drama film directed by Henri Diamant-Berger and starring Hope Hampton, Holbrook Blinn and Nita Naldi.

== Cast ==
- Hope Hampton as Shirley Chamberlain
- Holbrook Blinn as Don Calvert
- Nita Naldi as Blanchita D'Acosta
- Walter Miller as William Emerson

== Bibliography ==
- Munden, Kenneth White. The American Film Institute Catalog of Motion Pictures Produced in the United States, Part 1. University of California Press, 1997.
