= Alfred Ortlieb =

French cinematographer

- Born: Alfred C. Ortlieb; May 22, 1888; Ivry-sur-Seine, France
- Died: ??? ???
- Occupation: Cinematographer
- Spouse: Marie Messannat (m. 1914)

Alfred Ortlieb was a French cinematographer who worked in the American film industry during the 1910s and 1920s.

== Biography ==
Alfred was born in Ivry-sur-Seine, France, to Adolphe Ortlieb. After being educated in Paris, he began his career as a salesman before working as a cinematographer at Gaumont, Selig, and Metro. He often collaborated with director René Plaissetty, and supposedly shot all of Plaissetty's early films.

== Selected filmography ==
- The Unfair Sex (1926)
- Lover's Island (1925)
- The Fair Cheat (1923)
- None So Blind (1923)
- The Streets of New York (1922)
- Love's Penalty (1921)
- The Black Panther's Cub (1921)
- The Bait (1921)
- Deep Waters (1920)
- The White Circle (1920)
- The Empire of Diamonds (1920)
- Lifting Shadows (1920)
- A Modern Salome (1920)
- Tarnished Reputations (1920)
- The A.B.C. of Love (1919)
- The Thirteenth Chair (1919)
- The Twin Pawns (1919)
- Lafayette, We Come (1918)
- Waifs (1918)
- Greater Love Hath No Man (1915)
- The Shooting of Dan McGrew (1915)
