= Dorothy Gibson =

American actress (1889–1946)

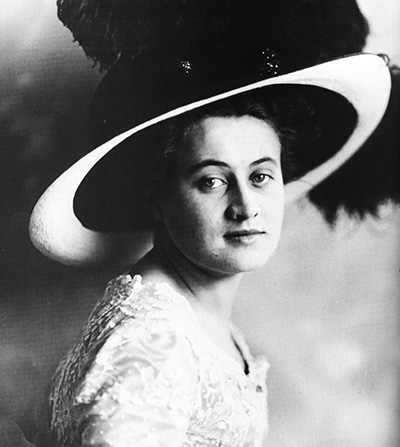
- Gibson in a publicity photo
- Born: Dorothy Winifred Brown; May 17, 1889; Hoboken, New Jersey, U.S.
- Died: February 17, 1946 (aged 56); Paris, France
- Occupations: Model, actress and singer
- Years active: 1906–1917
- Spouses: George Henry Battier, Jr. (m. 1910; div. 1913); Jules Brulatour (m. 1917; div. 1919)

Dorothy Gibson (born Dorothy Winifred Brown; May 17, 1889 – February 17, 1946) was an American actress, socialite and artist's model, active in the early 20th century. She survived the sinking of the Titanic and starred in the first motion picture based on the disaster.

== Early life and career ==
Dorothy Gibson was born on May 17, 1889, to John A. Brown and Pauline Caroline Boesen (1866–1961; Danish, and German immigrant father, and mother, respectively) as Dorothy Winifred Brown in Hoboken, New Jersey. Her father died when she was three years old, and her mother married John Leonard Gibson. Between 1906 and 1911, she appeared on stage as a singer and dancer in a number of theatre and vaudeville productions, the most important being on Broadway in Charles Frohman's musical The Dairymaids (1907). She was also a regular chorus member in shows produced by the Shubert Brothers at the Hippodrome Theatre.

In 1909, the year before she married George Henry Battier Jr., Dorothy Gibson began posing for famous commercial artist Harrison Fisher, becoming one of his favorite models. Dorothy's image appeared regularly on posters, postcards, various merchandising products and in book illustrations over the next three years.

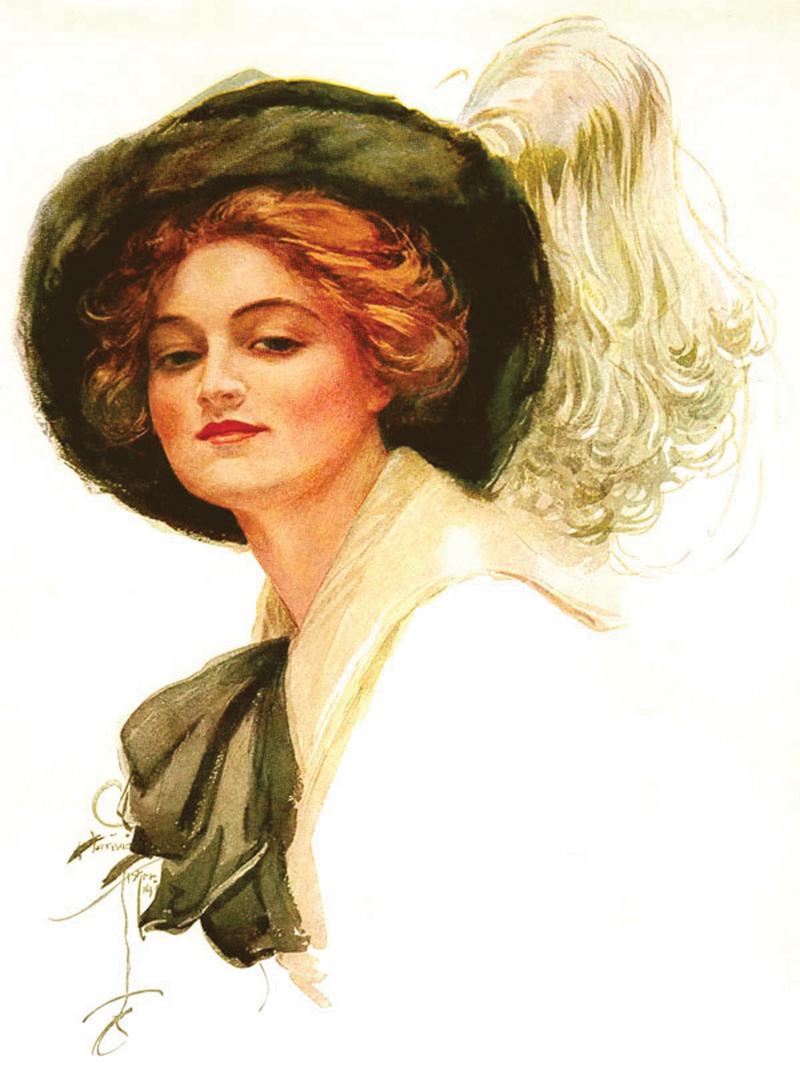
Dorothy Gibson as illustrated by Harrison Fisher, 1911

Fisher also often chose her likeness for the covers of best-selling magazines such as Cosmopolitan, Ladies Home Journal, and the Saturday Evening Post. Dorothy was widely publicized during this time as "The Original Harrison Fisher Girl".

Dorothy soon separated from Battier, though the two were not divorced until 1913.

== Film career ==
Represented by top theatrical agent Pat Casey, Dorothy entered movies in early 1911, joining the Independent Moving Pictures Company (IMP) as an extra and later the Lubin Studios as a stock player. She was hired as leading lady by the new U.S. branch of Paris-based Éclair Studios in July 1911. She was an instant hit with audiences, becoming one of the first actresses in the new medium of film to be promoted as a "star" in her own right. Praised for a natural, subtle acting style, she was particularly effective as a comedian in such popular one-reelers as Miss Masquerader (1911) and Love Finds a Way (1912), all of which were produced at Fort Lee, New Jersey, then the center of the burgeoning American motion picture industry.

Dorothy Gibson and Lamar Johnstone in a scene from the comedy, A Lucky Holdup (1912). The film was released April 11, 1912, while Gibson was on the RMS Titanic

Despite her popularity in comedies, one of Dorothy's most important parts was that of Molly Pitcher in the historical drama Hands Across the Sea (1911), Eclair Studios' debut vehicle and Gibson's first star turn.

== Titanic disaster and first film based on it ==
Dorothy Gibson's most famous screen role was that of herself in Saved from the Titanic (1912), based on her experiences in the legendary disaster. Saved From the Titanic, released a month after the sinking, was the first of many films about the event.

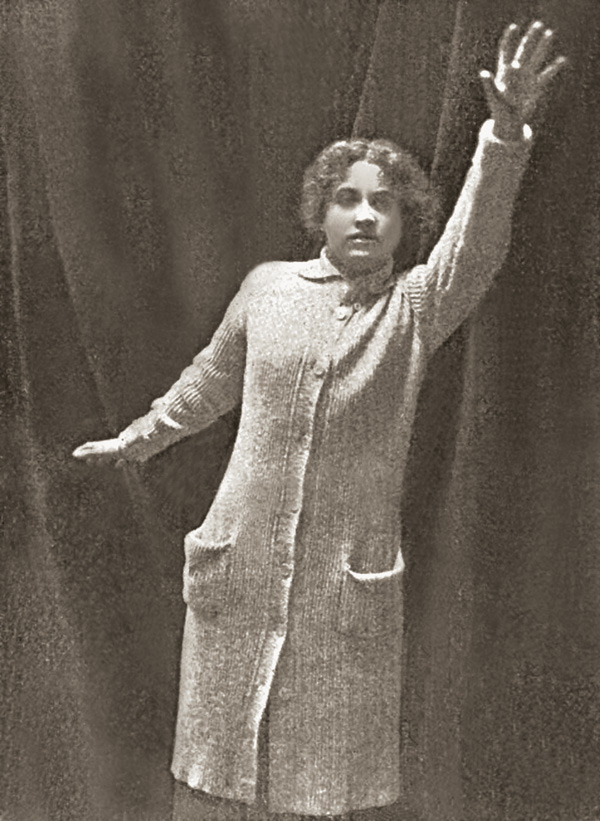
Dorothy Gibson in a promotional photo for Saved From the Titanic (1912), dressed in the same sweater she wore the night of the sinking

The Titanic is the best known aspect of Dorothy's life. After a six-week vacation in Italy with her mother, she was returning on the Titanic to make a new series of motion pictures for Eclair at Fort Lee. The women had been playing bridge with friends in the lounge on the night of the ship's fatal collision with the iceberg. With two of their game partners, they escaped in Lifeboat #7, the first lifeboat launched. After arriving in New York on the rescue ship Carpathia, Dorothy was persuaded by her manager to appear in a film based on the sinking. She not only starred in the one-reel drama but also wrote the screenplay. She appeared in the same clothing she had worn aboard the Titanic that night—a white silk evening dress topped with a cardigan and polo coat.

Although Saved From the Titanic was a tremendous success in America, Britain, and France, the only known prints were destroyed in a 1914 fire at the Eclair Studios in New Jersey. The loss of the film is considered by film historians to be one of the greatest casualties of the silent era. Dorothy Gibson's other accomplishments in early cinema included starring in one of the first feature films made in the United States (Hands Across the Sea, 1911), co-starring in the first American-produced serial or chapter play (The Revenge of the Silk Masks, 1912), and making one of the first-ever public appearances by a movie personality (January 1912).

With contemporary Mary Pickford, Dorothy was the highest paid movie actress in the world at the time of her premature retirement in May 1912. In a brief but eventful cinematic career, she appeared in an estimated 22 Eclair films and in an unspecified number while at Lubin and IMP studios. Dorothy left film to pursue a choral career, her most notable appearance in that venue being at the Metropolitan Opera House in Madame Sans-Gene (1915).

== Personal life ==
Dorothy Gibson

In 1911, Dorothy Gibson began a six-year love affair with married movie tycoon Jules Brulatour, head of distribution for Eastman Kodak and co-founder of Universal Pictures. Brulatour was also an advisor and producer for Eclair; he backed several of Gibson's films, including her 1912 hit Saved From the Titanic. A year later, while driving Brulatour's sports car in New York, Dorothy struck and killed a pedestrian. During the resulting court case, it was revealed in the press that she was his mistress. Although Brulatour was already separated from his wife, the humiliation of the scandal motivated her to sue him for divorce, which was finalized in 1915. Brulatour's rising fame and political power forced him to legitimize his relationship with Dorothy Gibson, and the pair were finally married in 1917.

Its legality challenged, the union was dissolved two years later as an invalid contract. To escape gossip and start a new life, Dorothy left New York for Paris, where she remained, except for the four years she spent in Italy during World War II. Brulatour married film actress Hope Hampton in 1923.

== Later life ==
A Nazi sympathizer and alleged intelligence operative, Dorothy renounced her involvement by 1944. She was arrested as an anti-Fascist agitator and imprisoned in the Milan prison of San Vittore, from which she escaped with two other prisoners, journalist Indro Montanelli and General Bortolo Zambon. The trio was aided through the intervention of Cardinal Ildefonso Schuster, Archbishop of Milan, and by a young chaplain of the Milanese resistance group Fiamme Verdi, Father Giovanni Barbareschi.

Living in France, in 1946, Dorothy died of a stroke in her apartment at the Hôtel Ritz Paris at the age of 56. She is buried at Saint Germain-en-Laye Cemetery. Gibson's estate was divided between her lover, Emilio Antonio Ramos, press attaché for the Spanish Embassy in Paris, and her mother, who lived until 1961 when she too was found dead in a Paris hotel room.

Dorthy Gibson in the 1912 film A Lucky Holdup

== Legacy ==
Dorothy Gibson's only surviving film is the adventure-comedy A Lucky Holdup (1912). Salvaged by collectors David and Margo Navone in 2001, it was preserved by the American Film Institute and is now archived at the Library of Congress.

The character of Susan Alexander in Orson Welles’ Citizen Kane (1941) may have been partly based on Dorothy, along with other real-life figures Marion Davies, Hope Hampton, and Ganna Walska. She was also the inspiration for a character in her friend Indro Montanelli’s novel General della Rovere, which was turned into an award-winning film by director Roberto Rossellini in 1959.

Sophie Winkleman portrayed Dorothy in the 2012 Julian Fellowes-written TV miniseries Titanic that commemorated the centenary of the disaster.

Authors Don Lynch and John P. Eaton were the first contemporary historians to rediscover Dorothy Gibson, writing and lecturing about her as early as the 1980s. The first in-depth study of Dorothy's mysterious later life was conducted by Phillip Gowan and published in the journal of the British Titanic Society in 2002.

== Filmography ==
Year	Title	Role	Notes
1911	A Show Girl's Stratagem		
1911	The Angel of the Slums		
1911	Good For Evil		
1911	Hands Across the Sea in '76	Grace Deane	
1911	Miss Masquerader	Heiress	
1911	The Musician's Daughter	Prima Donna	
1911	The Wrong Bottle	The Bride	
1912	Divorçons	The Wife	
1912	Mamie Bolton		
1912	Love Finds a Way	Helen	
1912	The Awakening	The Sweetheart	
1912	The Guardian Angel	The Wife	
1912	Getting Dad Married	Ellen	
1912	Bridge		
1912	The Kodak Contest	The Wife	
1912	It Pays to Be Kind	The Sister	
1912	A Living Memory	Her Memory	
1912	Brooms and Dustpans	Kissing Cousin	
1912	The White Aprons		
1912	A Lucky Holdup	Miss Barton	
1912	The Legend of Sleepy Hollow		
1912	The Easter Bonnet	Dora	
1912	Revenge of the Silk Masks	Society Girl	
1912	Saved from the Titanic	Miss Dorothy	Alternative title: A Survivor of the Titanic; Screenwriter
1912	Roses and Thorns		

== See also ==
- Rita Jolivet, American actress and Lusitania survivor
