= Lover's Island (film) =

1925 film by Henri Diamant-Berger

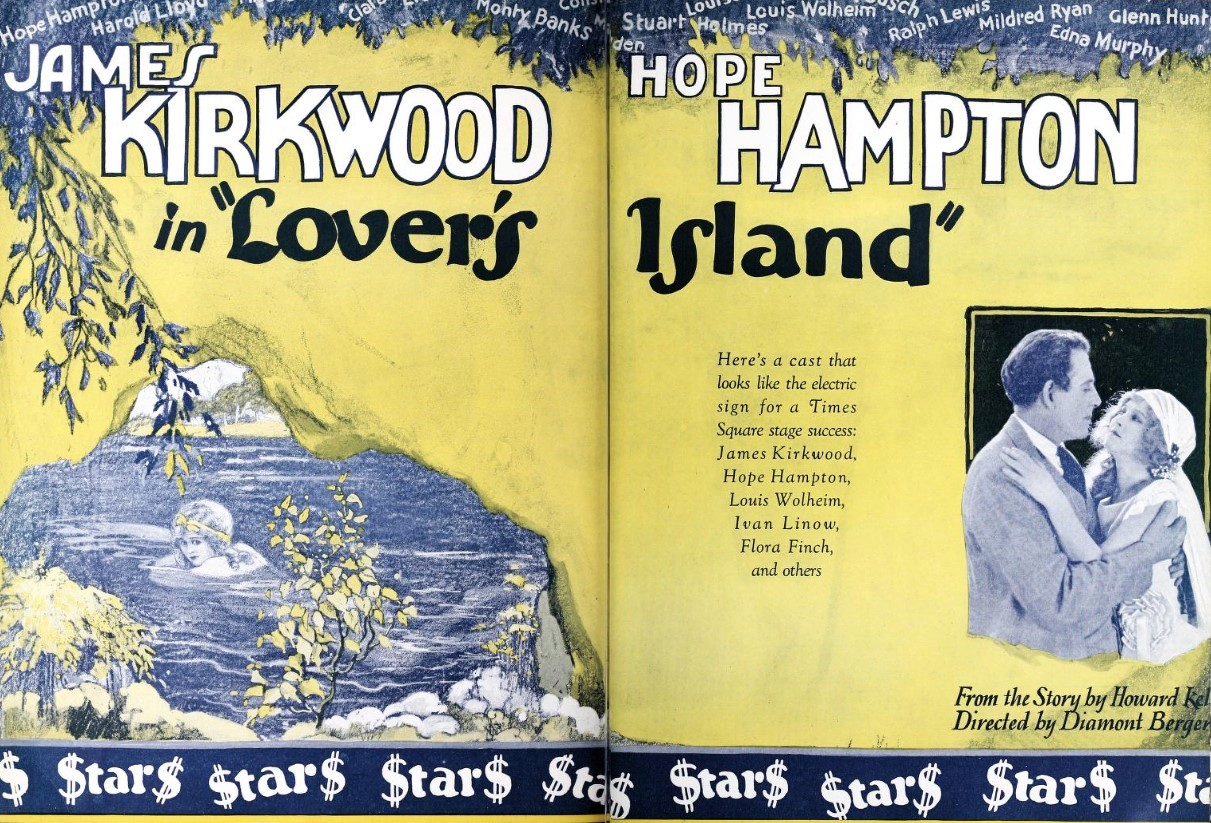
- Trade advertisement
- Directed by: Henri Diamant-Berger
- Written by: Arthur Hoerl; T. Howard Kelly
- Produced by: Henri Diamant-Berger
- Starring: Hope Hampton; James Kirkwood; Louis Wolheim
- Cinematography: Alfred Ortlieb
- Edited by: Marie St. Clair
- Production company: Encore Pictures
- Distributed by: Pathé Exchange; Ideal Films (UK)
- Release date: December 30, 1925
- Running time: 68 minutes
- Country: United States
- Language: Silent (English intertitles)

Lover's Island is a 1925 American silent drama film directed by Henri Diamant-Berger and starring Hope Hampton, James Kirkwood, and Louis Wolheim.

== Plot ==
As described in a film magazine review, the traditions of a small fishing town command that only couples who are to be married may go to Lover’s Island. However, Clemmy Dawson, the niece of a fisherman, goes there alone. A villainous townsman follows her, but her uncle arrives in time to frighten him off. A young male visitor later arrives at the island, and the young woman’s uncle, believing him to be the man he has once chased away, attempts to force him to marry his niece. The young woman objects, and declares she will marry the villain. This the visitor, who himself loves the woman, prevents by winning her love.

== Cast ==
- Hope Hampton as Clemmy Dawson
- James Kirkwood as Jack Avery
- Louis Wolheim as Capt. Joshua Dawson
- Ivan Linow as Sam Johnson
- Flora Finch as Amanda Dawson
- Flora le Breton as Julia Daw
- John Raymond as Randy Phelps

== Bibliography ==
- Munden, Kenneth White. The American Film Institute Catalog of Motion Pictures Produced in the United States, Part 1. University of California Press, 1997.
