= Hope Hampton =

American actress (1897–1982)

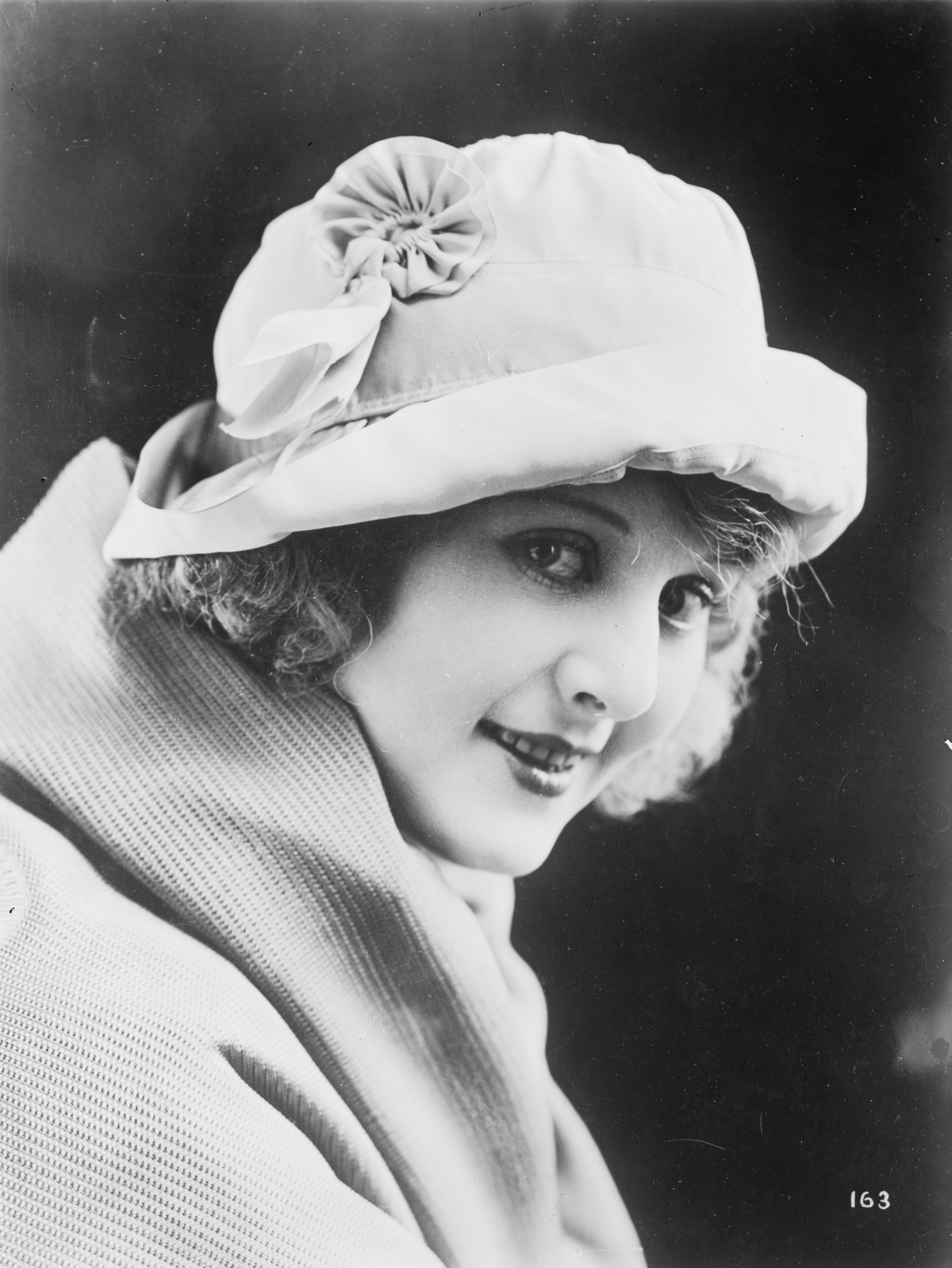
- Born: Mae Elizabeth Hampton; February 19, 1897; Houston, Texas, U.S.
- Died: January 23, 1982 (aged 84); New York City, U.S.
- Occupations: Actress, Producer
- Years active: 1918–1938
- Spouse: Jules Brulatour (m.1924-1946; his death)
- Children: 1

Mae Elizabeth Hampton (February 19, 1897 – January 23, 1982), known professionally as Hope Hampton, was an American actress and soprano. She was a silent motion picture actress and producer noted for her seemingly effortless incarnation of siren and flapper types in silent-picture roles during the 1920s. She was also an opera singer.

== Early life and silent movie career ==
The daughter of Ellsworth Kraft Hampton and his wife Evelyn Grace Hampton, Hope Hampton was born in Houston, Texas on February 19, 1897. She was raised in Philadelphia, Pennsylvania. She attended H. Sophie Newcomb Memorial College in New Orleans. There she participated in student productions of plays. Wishing to pursue a career as an actress, she studied drama at the American Academy of Dramatic Arts (then known as the Sargent Dramatic School) in New York City.

Hampton won a newspaper beauty contest in Dallas after one of her friends submitted her photograph to a local paper. The attention from this led to an offer to work in silent films. She first worked for director Maurice Tourneur in a minor uncredited part in Woman (1918). Through Tourneur she met American silent cinema pioneer Jules Brulatour. Brulatour, who was then married to Dorothy Gibson, began an affair with Hope and his marriage to Gibson ended in divorce in 1919. Brulatour was determined to make Hope a star, and founded Hope Hampton Productions to make films with her as his leading actress. Her first leading role in a film with this company was in the title part of A Modern Salome (1920).

She went on to feature prominently in several Brulatour-financed films. In 1923, Hampton and Brulatour wed. They remained married until his death in 1946.

== Soprano ==
A lyric soprano, Hampton was trained as an opera singer by voice teachers Pietro Cimini and Estelle Liebling; the latter also the teacher of Beverly Sills. She began her career in light operas while still performing as a film actress. In 1924 she portrayed the title role in the United States premiere of Leo Fall's operetta Madame Pompadour at the Forrest Theatre in Philadelphia. In 1927 she starred in the title role (aka Minnie Johnson) of Alfred E. Aarons's operetta My Princess at Broadway's Shubert Theatre. She made her grand opera debut with the Philadelphia Grand Opera Company (PGOC) on December 21, 1928 in the title role of Jules Massenet's Manon at the Academy of Music; a role which she partially recorded in a 1929 short film made by Vitaphone. She returned to the PGOC in 1929 as Mimì in La bohème with Dimitri Onofrei as Rodolfo, Mary Mellish as Musetta, and Artur Rodziński conducting.

Hampton had critical triumphs as both Manon and Mimì at the Opéra-Comique in Paris in the summer of 1929; making her European debut at that theatre on June 21, 1929. In 1930 she appeared as Marguerite in Faust for her first appearance at the Théâtre du Casino Grand-Cercle in Aix-les-Bains, and portrayed Manon at the Opéra Royal de Wallonie in Liege, the Opéra de Vichy, and at the Shrine Auditorium in Los Angeles. On September 25, 1930 she sang the role of Marguerite for her debut at the San Francisco Opera. She also performed several roles at the Opéra de Monte-Carlo in 1930, and appeared at the Paris Opera in December of that year.

In 1931 Hampton's mother, who had earlier divorced Hope's father and was now married to Harry C. Kennedy, died in Pittsburgh, Pennsylvania. In 1933 she performed the title role in Thaïs with the Montreal Grand Opera Company, and appeared as Manon at La Fenice in Venice. She sang Manon at the Boston Opera House in February 1934 with Mario Chamlee as Des Grieux and Mario Valle as Lescaut; repeating the role with the Chicago Grand Opera Company the following December.

== Brief return to film and later life ==
She returned to the screen in The Road to Reno (1938), a film directed by her husband which co-starred Randolph Scott and Glenda Farrell.

Later she was known as 'The Duchess of Park Avenue', a leading member of New York's social set. She was a prolific 'first-nighter', telling a reporter in 1977: "I'm a supporter of everything. Especially myself."

In 1978, she was crowned Queen of the Beaux Arts Ball. She presided with King Arthur Tracy.

She died of a heart attack on January 23, 1982 in New York City. She was 84 years old.

== Personal life ==
Hampton and Brulatour took a honeymoon trip to Egypt, there a Sheikh offered Brulatour £10,000 British pounds to buy his wife. Brulatour smiled at the Sheikh and told him that Mrs. Brulatour's jewels were worth more than that.

Brulatour also gave Hope Hampton a 5-story home on Park Avenue (built in 1885 and redesigned in 1921 by Emery Roth). She lived there for almost 60 years. The house was listed for $9 million in 2016.

== Complete filmography ==
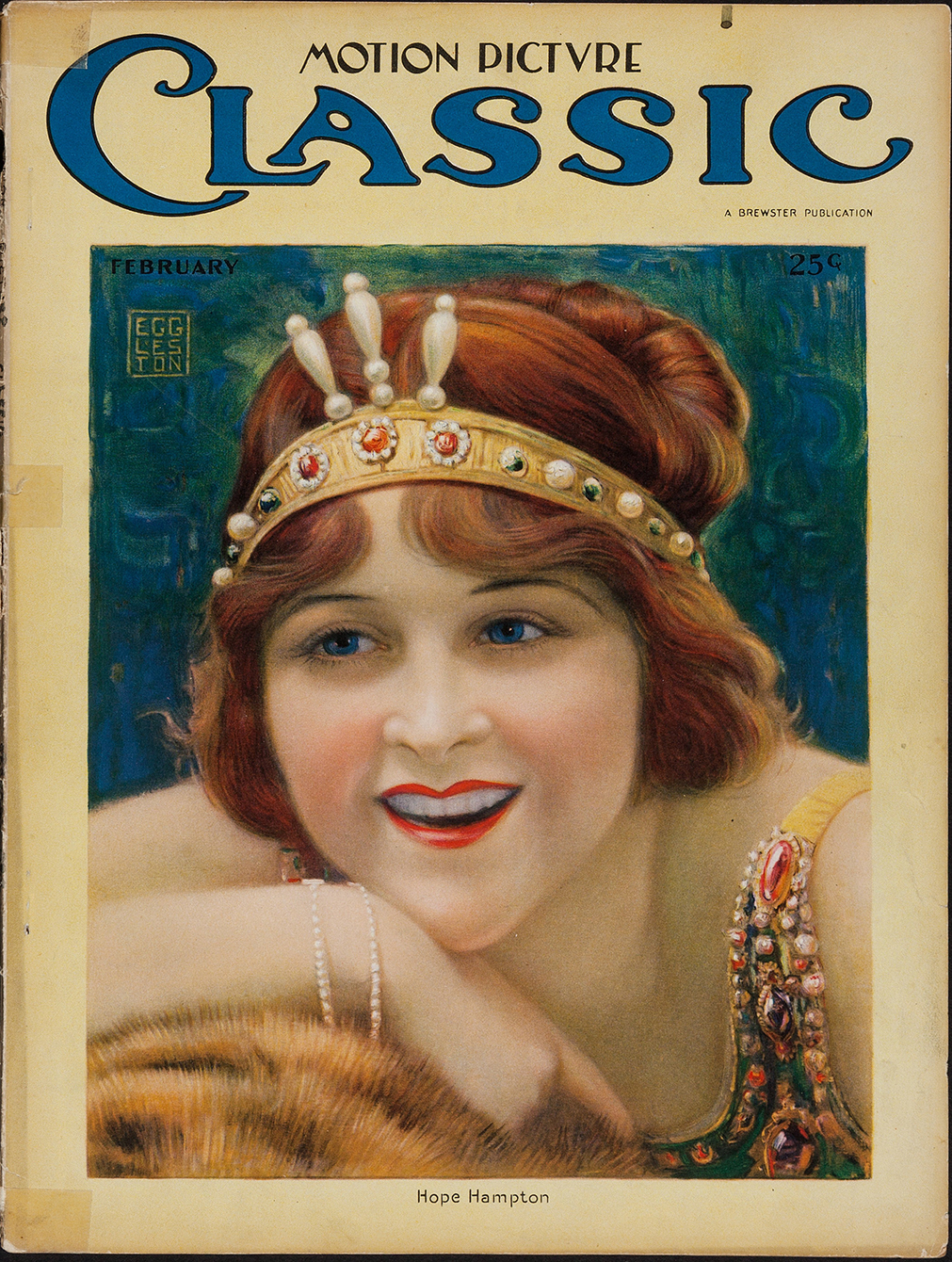
Hope Hampton on the cover of Motion Picture Classic magazine, Feb 1922, cover art by Benjamin Eggleston (1867-1937).

Year	Title	Role	Notes
1918	Woman		
1920	A Modern Salome	Virginia Hastings	Lost film
1921	The Bait	Joan Grainger	Lost film
1921	Love's Penalty	Janis Clayton	Lost film
1922	Stardust	Lily Becker	
1922	The Light in the Dark	Bessie MacGregor	A condensed 33 minute version survives, the original is lost
1923	Lawful Larceny	Marion Dorsey	Lost film
1923	Hollywood	Herself	Lost film
1923	The Gold Diggers	Jerry La Mar	An incomplete copy exists, with reels 2 and 3 missing
1923	Does It Pay?	Doris Clark	Lost film
1924	The Truth About Women	Hilda Carr	Lost film
1924	The Price of a Party	Grace Barrows	Incomplete
1925	Fifty-Fifty	Ginette	Lost film
1925	Marionettes		Short subject
1925	Lover's Island	Clemmy Dawson	
1926	The Unfair Sex	Shirley Chamberlain	
1927	Springtime of Love		Short subject
1927	The Call of the Sea		Short Subject
1938	The Road to Reno	Hope Hampton	
1961	Hey, Let's Twist!	Herself	Cameo
