= Does It Pay? =

1923 film by Charles Horan

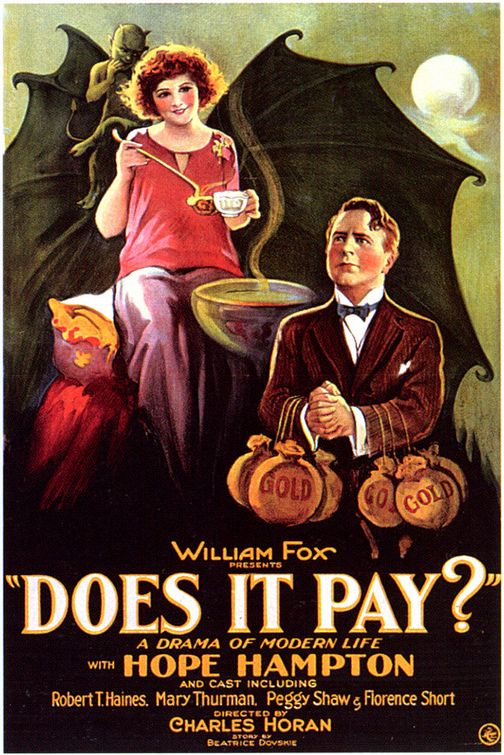
- Film poster
- Directed by: Charles Horan
- Written by: Howard Irving Young; Julius Steger
- Story by: Bernice Dovskie
- Produced by: William Fox
- Starring: Hope Hampton
- Cinematography: Joseph Ruttenberg
- Distributed by: Fox Film Corporation
- Release date: October 7, 1923
- Running time: 7 reels
- Country: United States
- Language: Silent (English intertitles)

Does It Pay? is a lost 1923 American silent society drama film directed by Charles Horan and starring Hope Hampton. It was produced and distributed by Fox Film Corporation.

== Cast ==
- Hope Hampton as Doris Clark
- Robert T. Haines as John Weston
- Florence Short as Martha Weston
- Walter Petri as Jack Weston
- Peggy Shaw as Alice Weston
- Charles Wellesley as Senator Delafield
- Mary Thurman as Marion
- Claude Brooke as Attorney Alden
- Pierre Gendron as Harold Reed
- Roland Bottomley as Francois Chavelle
- Marie Shotwell as Mrs. Clark
- Ben Grauer as The Boy
