= Love's Penalty =

1921 film directed by John Gilbert

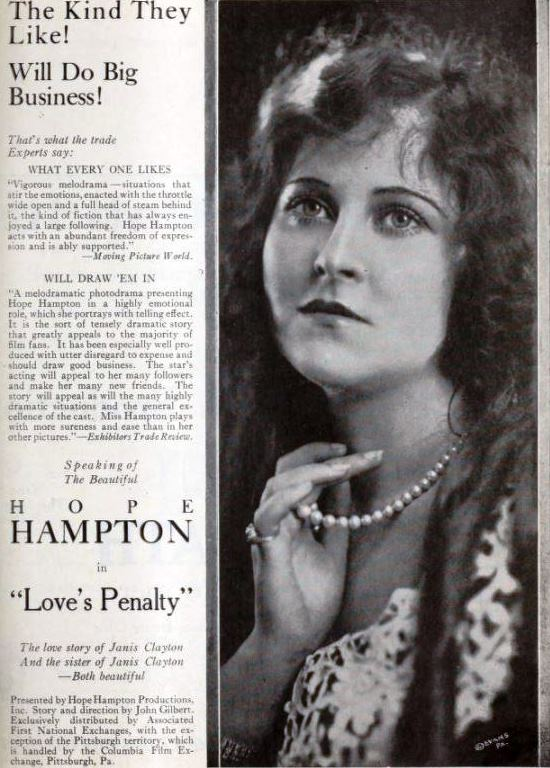
- Advertisement
- Directed by: John Gilbert
- Screenplay by: John Gilbert
- Starring: Hope Hampton; Irma Harrison; Mrs. Phillip Landau; Percy Marmont; John B. O'Brien; Virginia Valli
- Cinematography: Alfred Ortlieb
- Edited by: John Gilbert
- Production company: Hope Hampton Productions
- Distributed by: Associated First National Pictures
- Release date: June 1921
- Running time: 50 minutes
- Country: United States
- Language: Silent (English intertitles)

Love's Penalty is a 1921 American drama film written and directed by John Gilbert. The film stars Hope Hampton, Irma Harrison, Mrs. Phillip Landau, Percy Marmont, John B. O'Brien, and Virginia Valli. The film was released in June 1921, by Associated First National Pictures.

== Plot ==
In this melodramatic silent film, Janis Clayton seeks revenge for the death of her sister Sally and mother Martha. To accomplish this, Janis becomes the personal secretary of Steven Saunders, the man responsible for their deaths, and seduces him. She then convinces Saunders to murder his wife by sending her to Europe on a ship destined for dangerous waters. After the ship sinks, Janis reveals her plan to ruin him. Saunders is furious and attempts to kill her, but he is shot by a Bohemian artist whose wife and child also died in the shipwreck. After all is done, Janis lives as an outcast and eventually finds sanctuary in the home of a friendly minister named Reverend John Kirchway. The film ends when Janis is reunited with her former lover, Bud.

== Cast ==
- Hope Hampton as Janis Clayton
- Irma Harrison as Sally Clayton
- Mrs. Phillip Landau as Martha Clayton
- Percy Marmont as Steven Saunders
- John B. O'Brien as Bud Gordon
- Virginia Valli as Mrs. Steven Saunders
- Douglas Redmond as 'Little Jack'
- Charles Lane as Rev. John Kirchway
- Mrs. L. Faure as Madame Natalie

== Production ==
A revised version of "Love's Penalty" was retitled and edited by Katherine Hilliker, one of Hollywood's first female film editors. Hilliker had a reputation for "rescuing problem-plagued film," and in a review of her revised version of "Love's Penalty" the Motion Picture News wrote, "Miss Hilliker, in remoulding the picture, has supplied logical reasons for previously shallow spots . . . and made the photoplay a most interesting drama."

== Preservation ==
With no prints of Love's Penalty located in any film archives, it is considered a lost film.
