= Jules Brulatour =

American film producer (1870–1946)

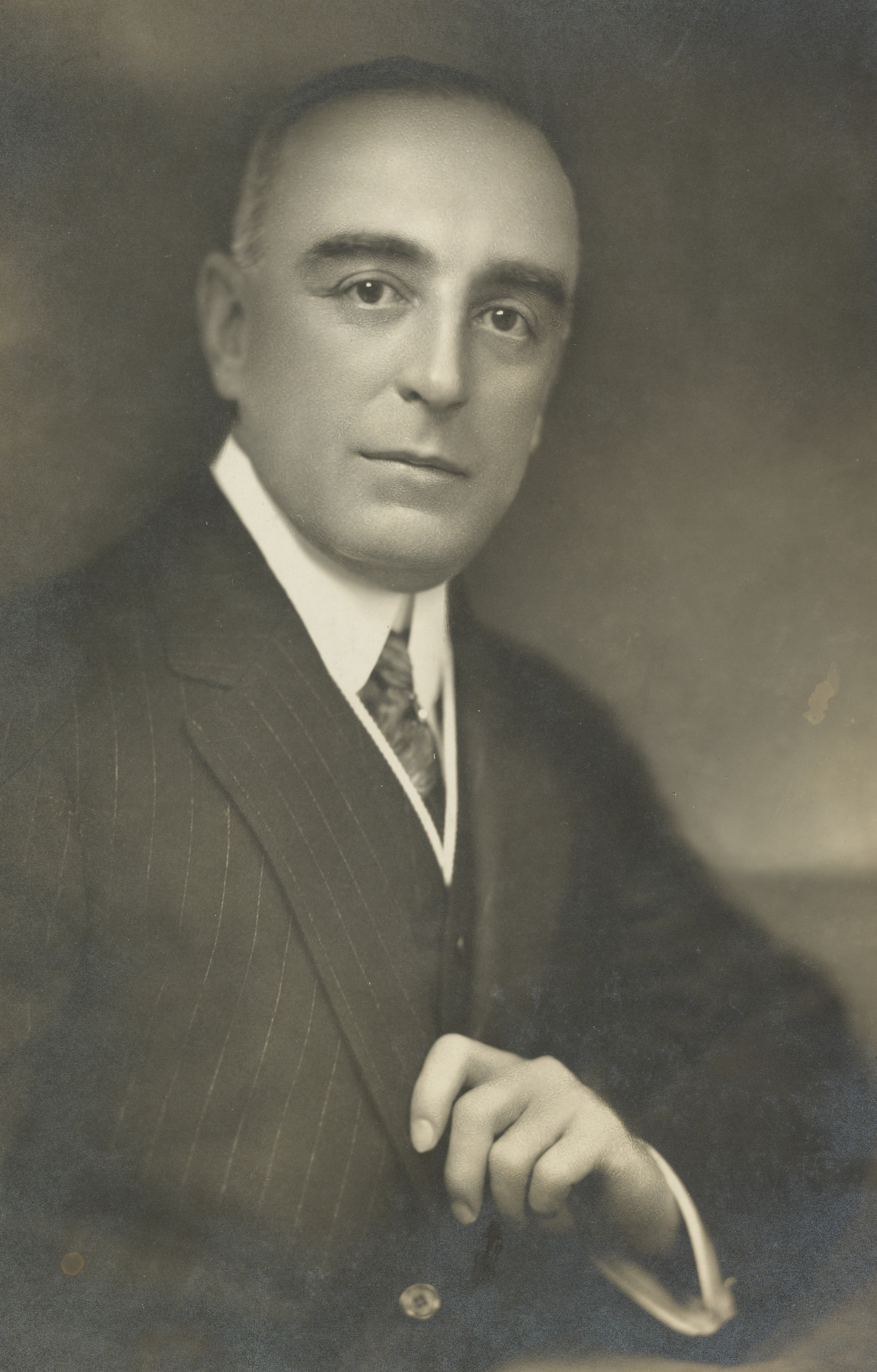
- Jules Brulatour
- Born: Pierre Ernest Jules Brulatour; April 7, 1870; New Orleans, Louisiana, U.S.
- Died: October 26, 1946 (aged 76); New York City, New York, U.S.
- Spouse(s): Clara Isabelle Blouin (m. 1894; div. 1915); Dorothy Gibson (m. 1917; div. 1919); Hope Hampton (m. 1923)
- Children: 3

Pierre Ernest Jules Brulatour (April 7, 1870 – October 26, 1946) was a pioneering executive figure in American silent cinema. Beginning as American distribution representative for Lumiere Brothers raw film stock in 1907, he joined producer Carl Laemmle in forming the Motion Picture Distributing and Sales Company in 1909, effectively weakening the stronghold of the Motion Picture Patents Company, headed by Thomas Edison, a large trust company that was then monopolizing the American film industry through contracts with hand-picked, established studios. By 1911 Brulatour was president of the Sales Company. He was a founder of the Universal Film Manufacturing Company, later known as Universal Pictures.

== Early life ==
Pierre Ernest Jules Brulatour was born in New Orleans on April 7, 1870 to Thomas and Marie Mossy Brulatour. His grandfather Pierre Ernest Brulatour was a wine importer from Bordeaux.

== Early career ==
Jules Brulatour moved to New York City in 1898 to work for the Manhattan Optical Co. based in Creskill as a sales representative of photographic paper, cameras and lenses. In 1907, he became sales chief for Lumiere North American Co.

Through the Sales Company, the growing number of independent filmmakers were able to obtain raw stock from Lumiere, for which Jules Brulatour remained sole US distributor, thereby cutting into profits for Kodak mogul George Eastman, whose film supply was exclusive to the Patents Company. Eastman soon realized he was on the losing side and approached Brulatour with a contract to sell his stock to the independents through the Sales Company. Brulatour accepted and his long association as head of distribution for Eastman Kodak began.

In addition to his position with Kodak and his presidency of the Sales Company, Jules Brulatour also launched the Animated Weekly newsreel series and co-founded Peerless Pictures. He was also an advisor and producer for the French-based Eclair Film Company, which opened in 1911 an extensive, state-of-the-art studio at Fort Lee, New Jersey, then the center of the burgeoning American movie industry. Eclair was a leader in technical and artistic advancements afoot in filmmaking at the time, and its American branch was hailed as a mecca for top talent, which Brulatour helped cultivate.

=== Dorothy Gibson ===
Dorothy Gibson, the second Mrs. Jules Brulatour

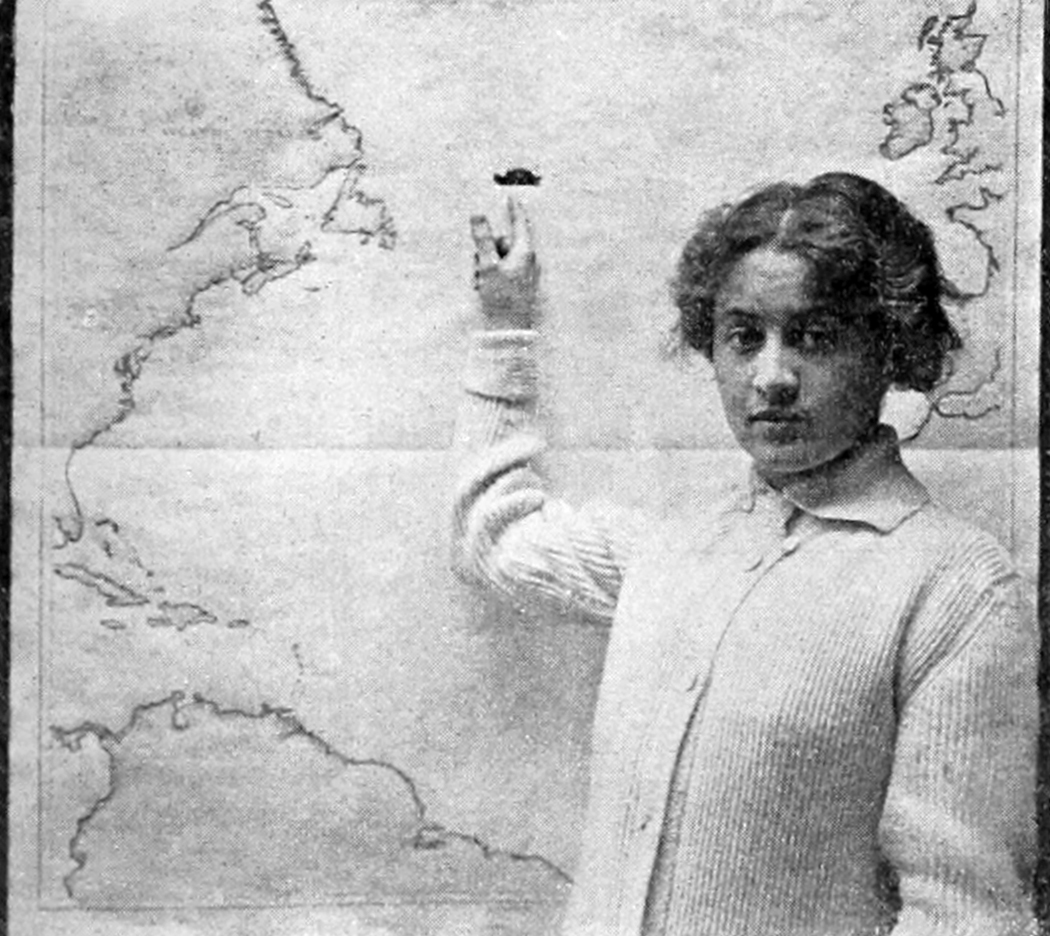
In this promotional photograph for Saved from the Titanic, Gibson wears the same cardigan in which she was rescued by the Carpathia.

In fact, its first leading lady, Dorothy Gibson, already well known as a model for leading illustrator Harrison Fisher, not only became a big star in Eclair vehicles but she landed the married Brulatour as a boyfriend. His mistress proved herself a marketable screen personality, especially as a comedian in such popular one-reelers as Miss Masquerader (1911) and Love Finds a Way (1912). But her best-known role was that of herself in the drama Saved From the Titanic (1912), based on her real-life experiences as a survivor of the famous maritime disaster. The movie, produced by Brulatour, was the first of many cinematic and theatrical productions about the sinking. It was released May 16, 1912, just over a month after the Titanic went down. Brulatour also produced the first newsreel about the Titanic disaster (Animated Weekly, issue No. 7, released April 22, 1912).

After the success of Saved From the Titanic, Dorothy Gibson retired from Eclair, choosing to study opera which Brulatour encouraged and financed. In 1913 her new career was interrupted when she was involved in a car accident in which a pedestrian was killed. The resulting lawsuit revealed that the car driven by Dorothy was owned by Jules Brulatour and that she was his lover. Although he was already separated from his wife, Clara Isabelle Blouin Brulatour, the court scandal prompted her to initiate a divorce which was finalized in 1915. With Clara he had three children, Claude, Yvonne, and Ruth.

=== Film production and Universal Film ===
Meantime, Brulatour had teamed up again with Carl Laemmle to form the Universal Film Manufacturing Company, later known as Universal Pictures. This corporation, begun in 1912, drew together competing studios in an unprecedented amalgamation of talent and resources. Serving as Universal's first president, Brulatour was accused of conflict of interest by George Eastman, and although he denied the charge, he resigned. Despite its unfortunate outcome for Brulatour personally, the consolidation of the leading independent filmmakers under the umbrella of Universal was a major turning point in the history of American motion pictures. The merger not only signaled the triumph of a free market in the industry but lead to the creation of the first major Hollywood studio –– Universal City, constructed in 1914–1915 in Los Angeles in an effort by Laemmle to centralize operations.

In 1914 Brulatour funded the construction of larger studios for Peerless Pictures at Fort Lee as well as the rebuilding of Eclair's processing laboratory, storage vault and offices, which had burned, destroying negatives for almost all the firm's films made over the last three years.

Throughout 1915–1916, while his girlfriend appeared with moderate success in Metropolitan Opera House productions, Brulatour was promoted to the presidency of the Eastman Kodak Company. He also helped form another studio at Fort Lee, Paragon Films, for which he built a large facility specifically for the on-site production of Eastman stock.

=== Political influence ===
Jules Brulatour in 1935

By 1917 Jules Brulatour was a very rich man, reportedly worth several million dollars, and he was increasingly powerful politically. That year he was appointed to the executive committee of the National Association of the Motion Picture Industry. Brulatour chiefly conferred with the group's War Cooperation Subcommittee, which networked with the US government for the promotion of public welfare and propaganda films.

It is believed that his sudden high profile in Washington, D.C. determined him to legitimize his relationship with Dorothy Gibson, whom he finally married on July 6, 1917, a week before his first conference with President Woodrow Wilson and United States Treasury Department Secretary McAdoo.

The next year Jules Brulatour was invited to join the film division of President Wilson's Committee on Public Information, but this appointment was less fruitful. Arguments and financial troubles arose almost immediately, and allegations flew of undue influence from media baron William Randolph Hearst and even of bribes from Brulatour; nothing was proven but he resigned under pressure.

Privately, Brulatour's life was also unraveling. His marriage to Dorothy infuriated his first wife, who started proceedings against him, claiming the union was illegal since he had obtained a divorce in Kentucky instead of New York, the state of his residency. This was a drawn-out, complicated affair, and the stress ruined his second marriage, which was finally dissolved as an invalid contract in 1919, a humiliated Dorothy Gibson leaving New York shortly thereafter to live in relative peace and anonymity in Paris. She was allotted alimony and permitted the use of the Brulatour name.

In 1926, after a three-year investigation of Kodak by the Federal Trade Commission, Brulatour was severely fined, along with George Eastman, for "conspiracy to hinder and restrain commercial competition."

=== Hope Hampton and declining career ===
Jules Brulatour married a third time in 1923. His new wife was starlet Hope Hampton, a Texas-born beauty queen who was just beginning in movies. Though still head of Kodak, Brulatour was increasingly interested in his new bride's career, which he personally managed. Like Dorothy before her, Hope's film work was short-lived, and she took another page from her predecessor's book when she decided to go into opera, urged on and funded by Brulatour.

The last 20 years of his life were largely uneventful. He and Hope were opening night regulars on Broadway; she especially was a magnet for press attention. Giving up acting and singing by the early-1940s, Hope devoted herself to the high-life –– entertaining lavishly, dressing extravagantly and delighting in being dubbed "Duchess of Park Avenue" in the society columns.

But there were a few odd episodes, such as an unsolved shooting incident in 1939, in which Brulatour was wounded by a would-be assassin whom he refused to identify. And in 1941, he was chagrined to learn that the boozy flop of an opera singer in Citizen Kane, the hit RKO film directed by and starring Orson Welles, was partly based on Hope and his ex-wife Dorothy.

Jules Brulatour died on 26 October 1946 in Mount Sinai Hospital after an illness that lasted several weeks.

== Distinctions ==
- 1930: French Legion of Honor for his services to the motion picture industry during World War I.

== Personal life ==
With his first wife Clara Isabelle, he had a son and two daughters.
