= The Road to Reno (1938 film) =

1938 film by S. Sylvan Simon

- Directed by: S. Sylvan Simon
- Written by: Roy Chanslor; Adele Comandini; F. Hugh Herbert (adaptation); Charles Kenyon (adaptation); Brian Marlow (add. dialogue)
- Based on: the story "The Road to Reno" by I. A. R. Wylie
- Produced by: Jules Brulatour (uncredited)
- Starring: Randolph Scott; Hope Hampton
- Cinematography: George Robinson
- Edited by: Paul Landres; Maurice Wright
- Music by: Score: Charles Henderson; Songs: Jimmy McHugh (music); Harold Adamson (lyrics)
- Production company: Universal Pictures
- Distributed by: Universal Pictures
- Release date: August 1938
- Running time: 68-72 minutes
- Country: United States
- Language: English

The Road to Reno is an American screwball comedy film starring Randolph Scott and Hope Hampton.

== Cast ==
- Randolph Scott as Steve Fortness
- Hope Hampton as Linda Halliday
- Glenda Farrell as Sylvia Shane
- Helen Broderick as Aunt Minerva
- Alan Marshal as Walter Crawford
- David Oliver as Salty
- Ted Osborne as Linda's Attorney
- Samuel S. Hinds as Sylvia's Attorney
- Charles Murphy as Mike
- Spencer Charters as The Judge
- Dot Farley as Mrs. Brumleigh (as Dorothy Farley)
- Mira McKinney as Hannah
- Renie Riano as Woman Bailiff
- Lita Chevret as Gladys
- Willie Fung as Lame Duck
- Jack Rube Clifford as Trucker
