= A Modern Salome =

1920 film by Léonce Perret

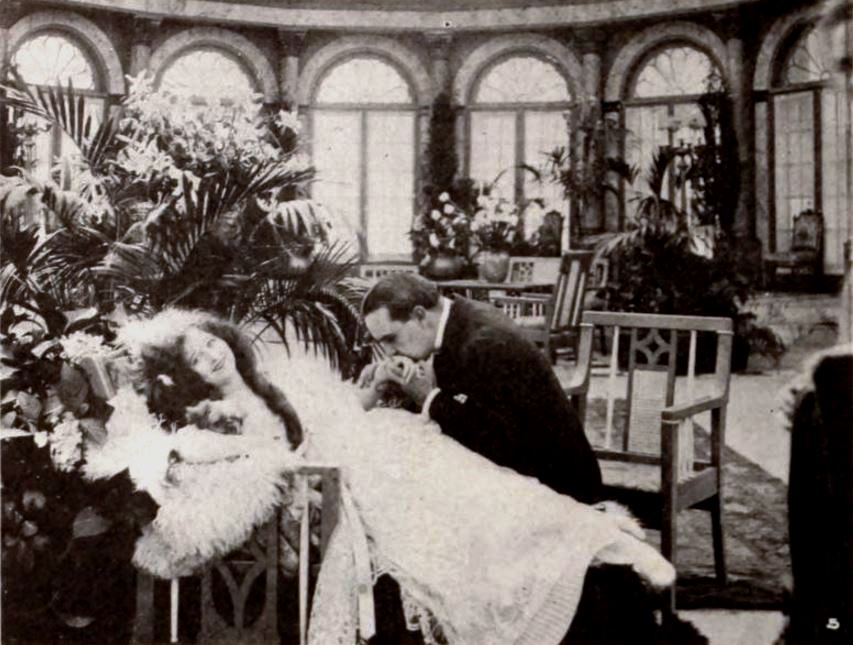
- Directed by: Leonce Perret
- Written by: Leonce Perret
- Based on: Salome by Oscar Wilde
- Produced by: Metro Pictures
- Starring: Hope Hampton
- Cinematography: Alfred Ortlieb; Harry D. Harde
- Production company: Hope Hampton Productions
- Distributed by: Metro Pictures
- Release date: March 1920
- Running time: 6 reels
- Country: United States
- Language: Silent (English intertitles)

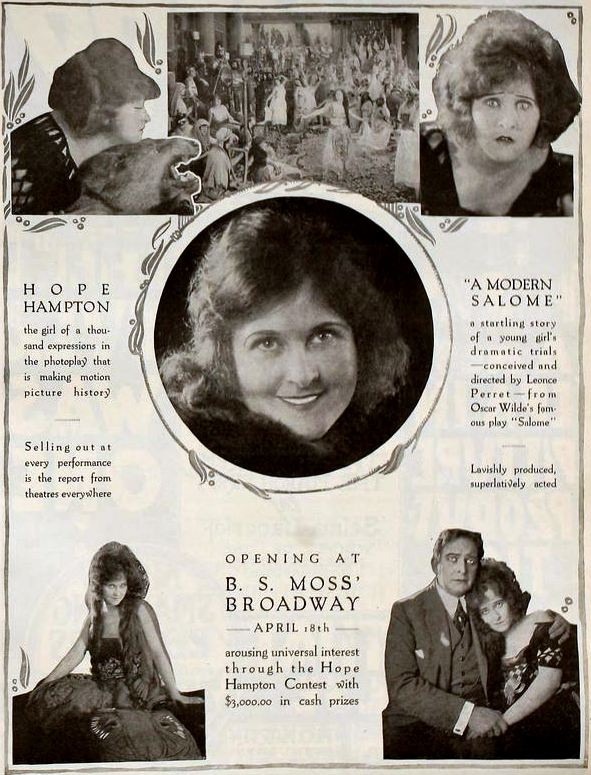
Period advert.

A Modern Salome is a lost 1920 American silent drama film directed by Leonce Perret and starring Hope Hampton. It was produced and distributed by Metro Pictures. The film is based on the 1891 Oscar Wilde play Salome.

== Plot ==
A display advert of the time states: "Her fancy swept her back through the ages, and she was dancing before king Herod for the head of John the Baptist. Yet she was a modern woman, a hot-house product of Twentieth Century Society."

== Cast ==
- Hope Hampton as Virginia Hastings
- Sidney Mason as Robert Monti
- Percy Standing as James Vandam
- Arthur Donaldson as Walter Greene
- Wyndham Standing as Harry Torrence
- Agnes Ayres as Helen Torrence
