= The Bait (1921 film) =

1921 film directed by Maurice Tourneur

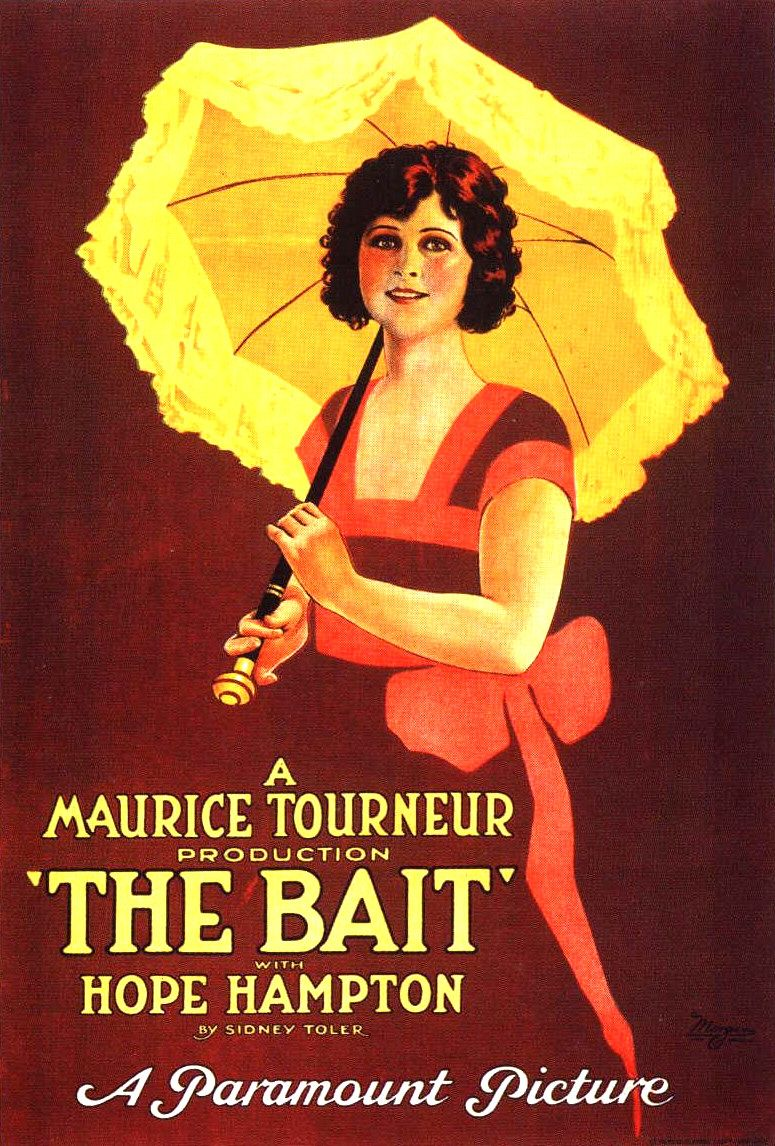
- Film poster
- Directed by: Maurice Tourneur
- Written by: John Gilbert (scenario)
- Based on: The Tiger Lady by Sidney Toler
- Produced by: Hope Hampton
- Starring: Hope Hampton
- Cinematography: Alfred Ortlieb
- Distributed by: Paramount Pictures
- Release date: January 2, 1921
- Running time: 50 minutes
- Language: Silent (English intertitles)

The Bait is a 1921 American silent crime drama film produced by and starring Hope Hampton, directed by Maurice Tourneur, and distributed by Paramount Pictures. John Gilbert, then working for Tourneur, wrote the scenario (silent film version of a screenplay) based on the stage play The Tiger Lady by Sidney Toler. Filmed in 1920, the picture was released a day after New Year's 1921. The Bait is now considered to be a lost film.

This 1921 release should not be confused with the 1916 film The Bait, which was directed by William J. Bowman and starred Betty Harte and William Clifford.

== Plot ==
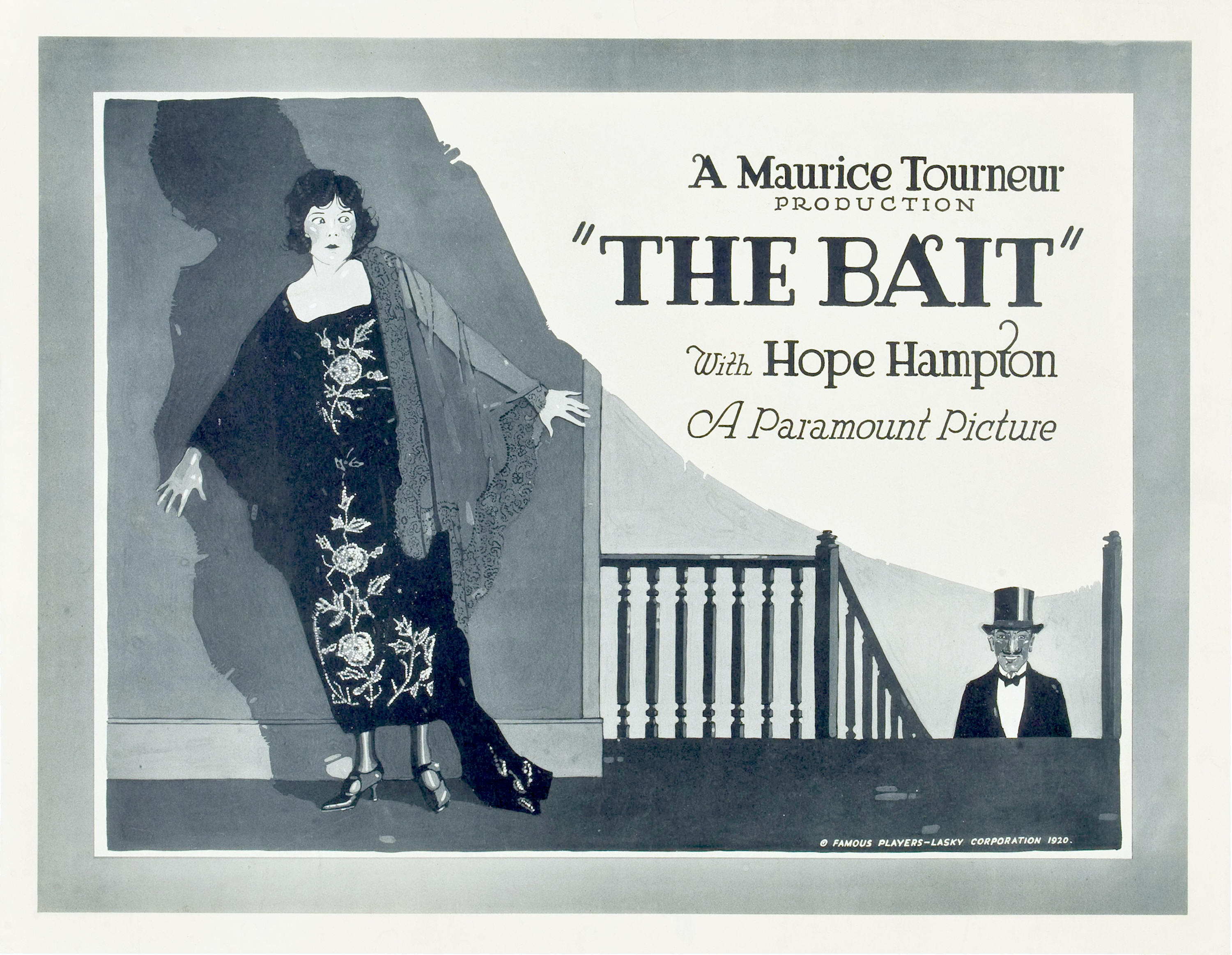
Lobby card

Joan Grainger is about to be "sent up" to prison after being falsely accused of stealing when she is kidnapped by Bennett Barton, mastermind of a band of crooks of which Simpson is a member. Joan accepts Bennett's assistance when he sends her to Europe and later joins her. They live in luxury when she meets John Warren, a wealthy American. Joan receives her first jar of suspicion when Bennett introduces her to John as being Bennett's daughter. Bennett later tells her the plan is for her to marry John so that they will have access to the money. The girl rebels but Bennett threatens to send her back to prison or, still worse, expose her to John, with whom she has now fallen in love. The entire party return to the United States where Bennett forces Joan to accept John's proposal of marriage. In the meantime some members of Bennett's gang have double-crossed him and tell Joan of the original theft frame-up. A signed confession is secured from the girl that did the framing. In the effort to secure the confession, Bennett is killed by Simpson, who had been after the "goods" on Bennett. John is willing to have Joan despite all of this and they are happy.

== Cast ==
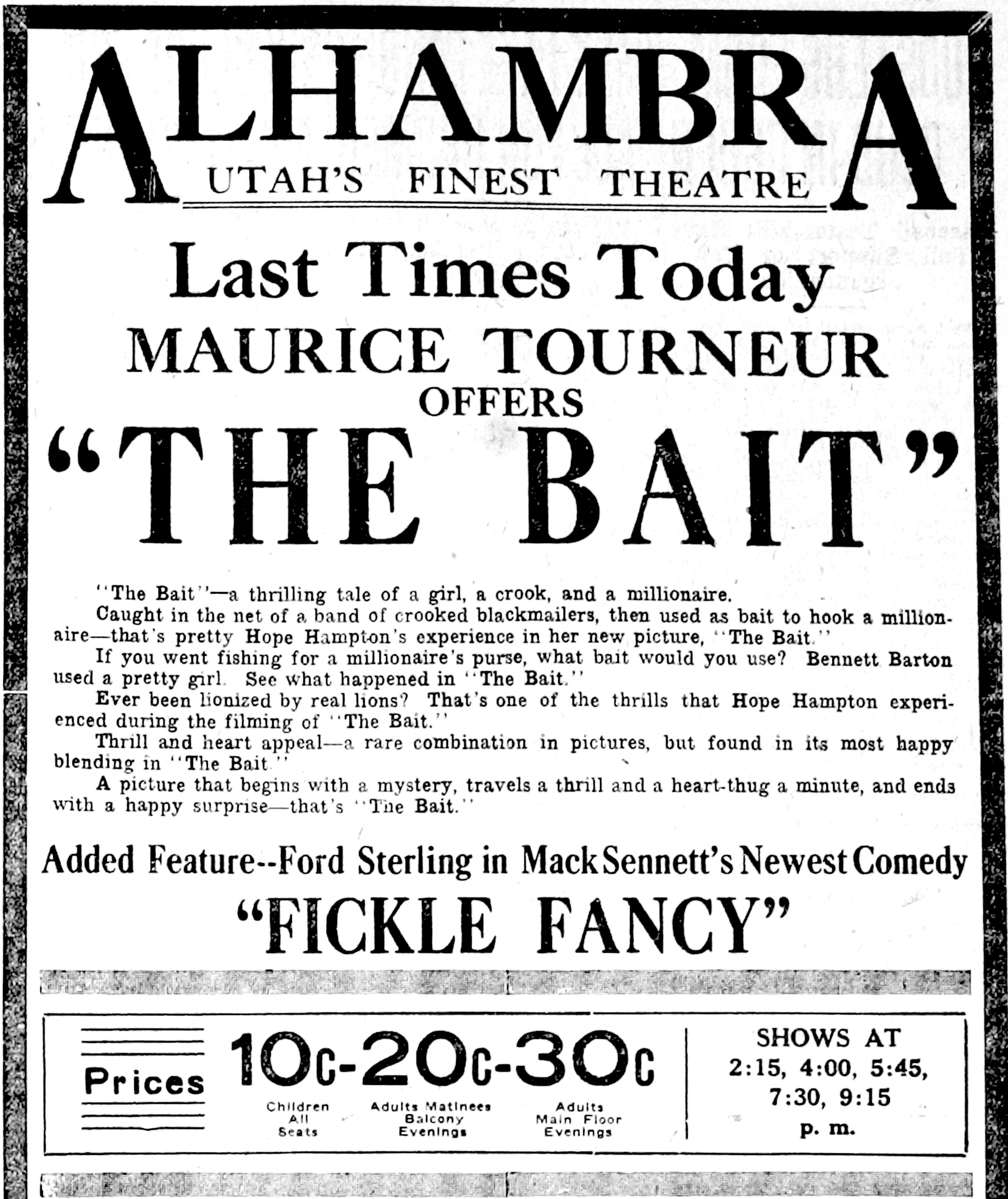
Contemporary newspaper advertisement

- Hope Hampton as Joan Grainger
- Harry Woodward as John Warren, 'The Fish'
- Jack McDonald as Bennett Barton, 'The Fisherman'
- James Gordon as John Garson, 'The Game Warden'
- Rae Ebberly as Dolly, 'The Hooked'
- Joe Singleton as Simpson, 'The Bait-Catcher'
- Poupee Andriot as Madeline, 'The Minnow'
- Dan Crimmins Jr. as Jimmy, 'The Bullfish'
