= Harrison Fisher =

American illustrator (c. 1875–1934)

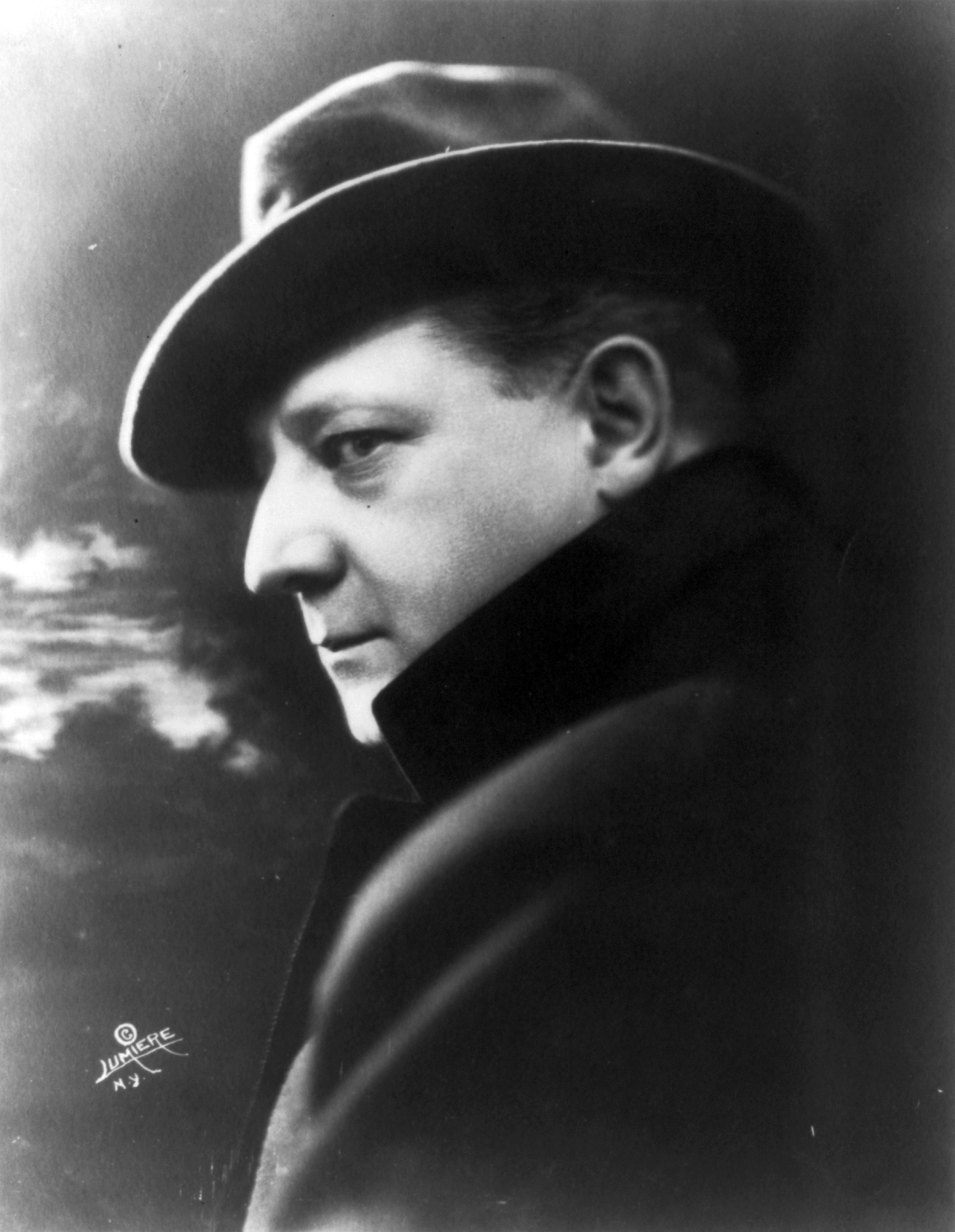
- Fisher in 1917
- Born: Harrison Fisher; July 27, 1875 or 1877; Brooklyn, New York City, New York, U.S.
- Died: January 19, 1934 (58–56); Manhattan, New York City, New York, U.S.
- Education: San Francisco Art Association
- Known for: Painting, Photography
- Notable work: discovered the It girl, Clara Bow

Harrison Fisher (July 27, 1875 or 1877 – January 19, 1934) was an American illustrator.

== Career ==
Fisher was born in Brooklyn, New York City and began to draw at an early age. Both his father and his grandfather were artists. Fisher spent much of his youth in San Francisco, and studied at the San Francisco Art Association.

In California he studied with Amédée Joullin.

In 1898, he moved back to New York and began his career as a newspaper and magazine illustrator, working for the San Francisco Call and the San Francisco Examiner, drawing sketches and decorative work. He became known particularly for his drawings of women, which won him acclaim as the successor of Charles Dana Gibson. Together with fellow artists Howard Chandler Christy and Neysa McMein, he constituted the Motion Picture Classic magazine's "Fame and Fortune" contest jury of 1921/1922, who discovered the It girl, Clara Bow. Fisher's work appeared regularly on the cover of Cosmopolitan magazine from the early 1900s until his death.

He also painted for books; his work included the cover for George Barr McCutcheon's Beverly of Graustark and Nedra, and illustrations for Harold Frederic's The Market Place and Jerome K. Jerome's Three Men on Wheels.

Artwork by Harrison Fisher
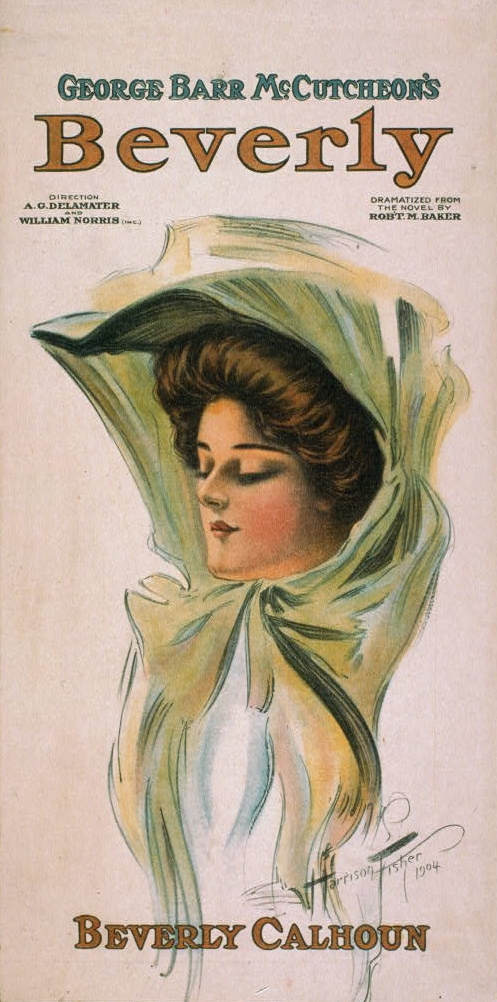
Theatre poster for Beverly by George Barr McCutcheon (1904)

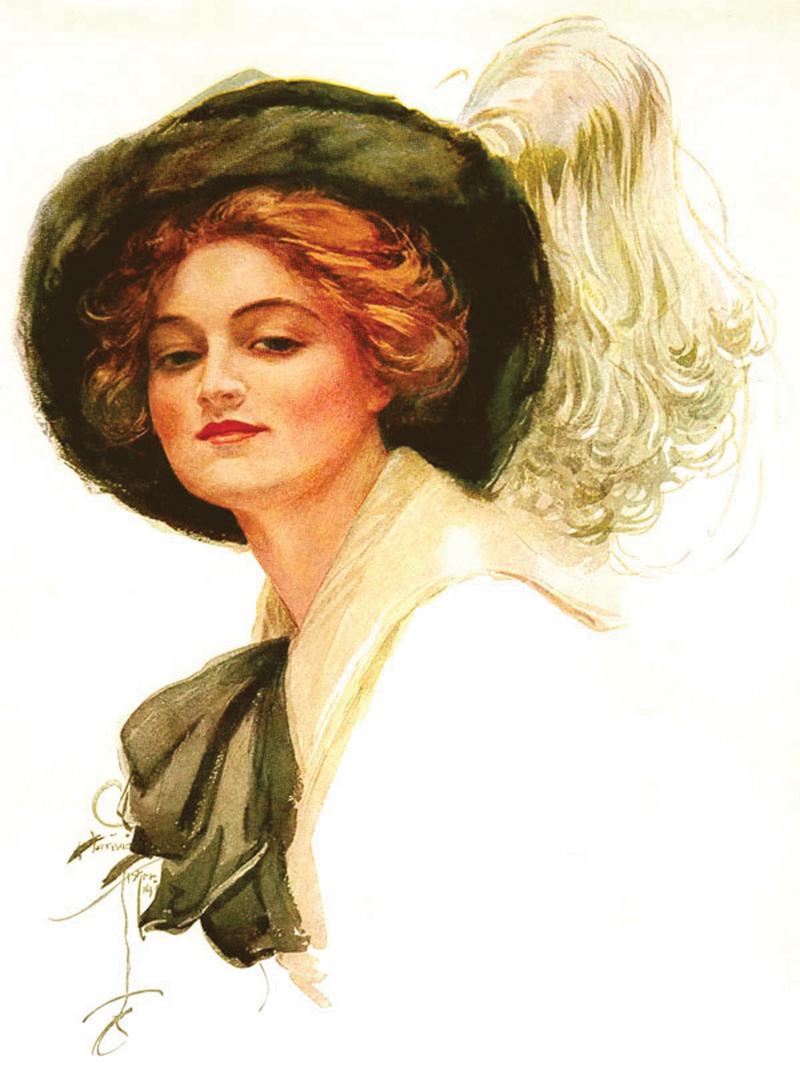
Drawing of Dorothy Gibson (1911)

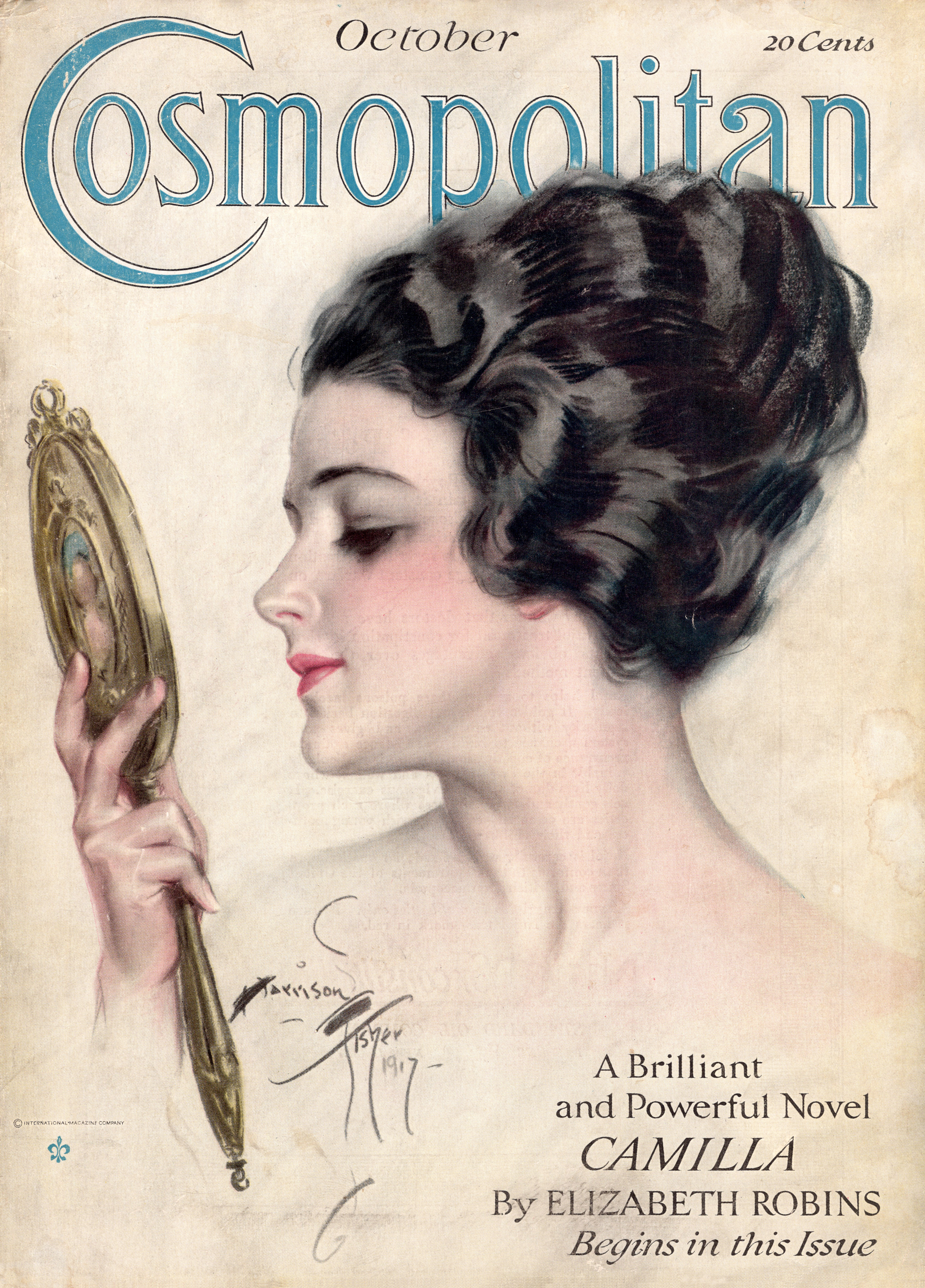
Cover illustration for Cosmopolitan (October 1917)

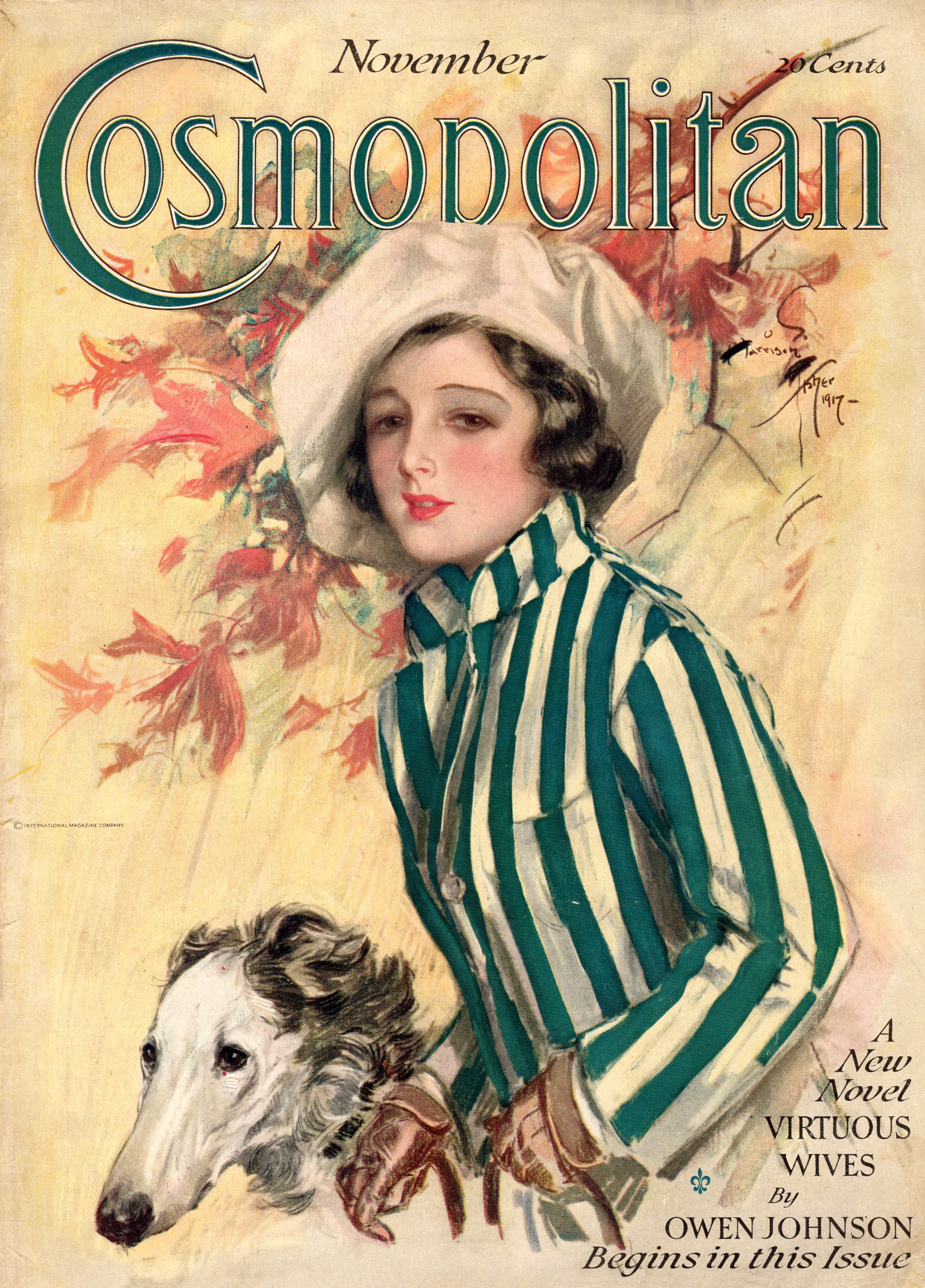
Cover illustration for Cosmopolitan (November 1917)

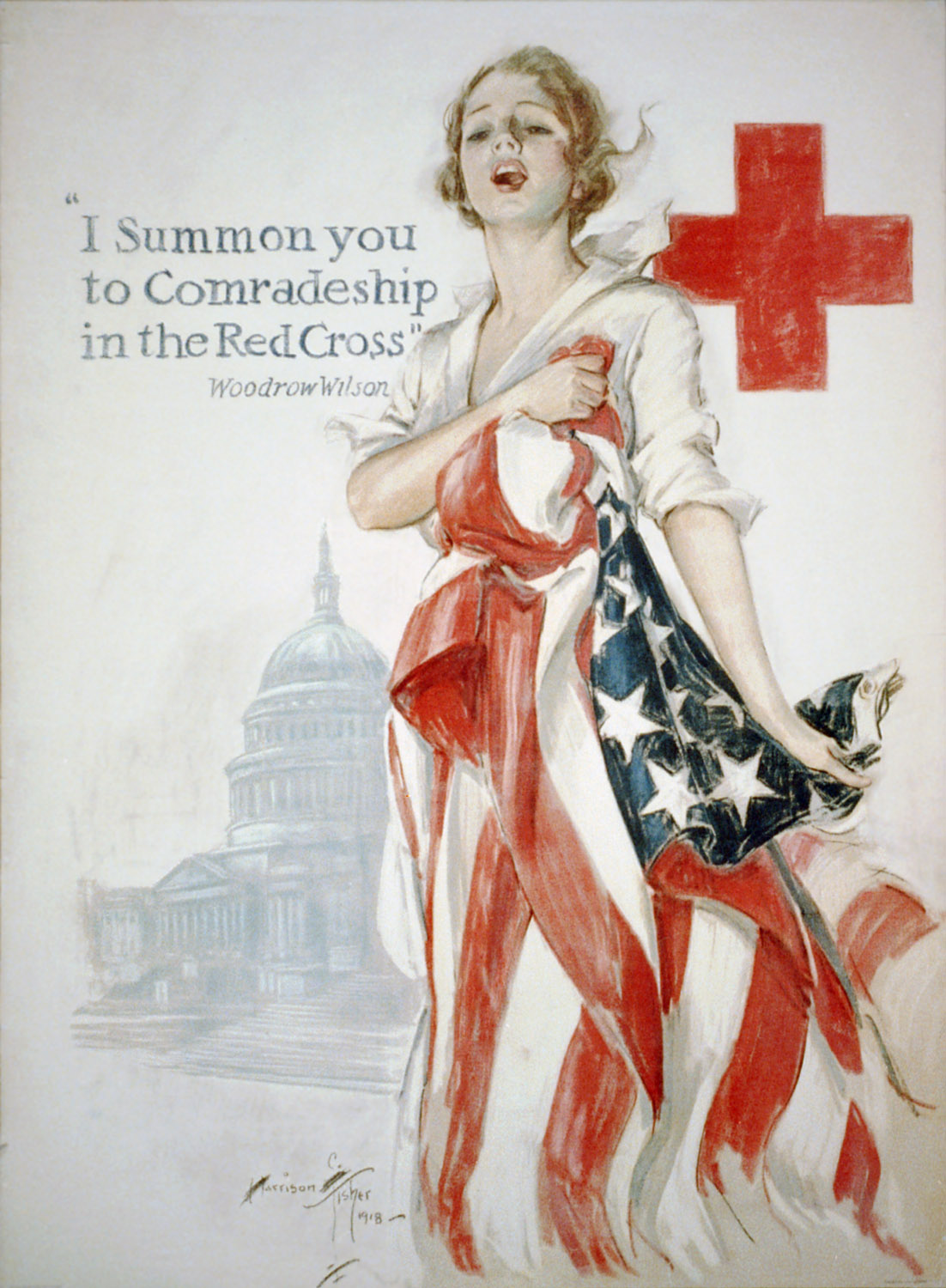
Poster for the American Red Cross (1918)
