= The Pit and the Pendulum (1913 film) =

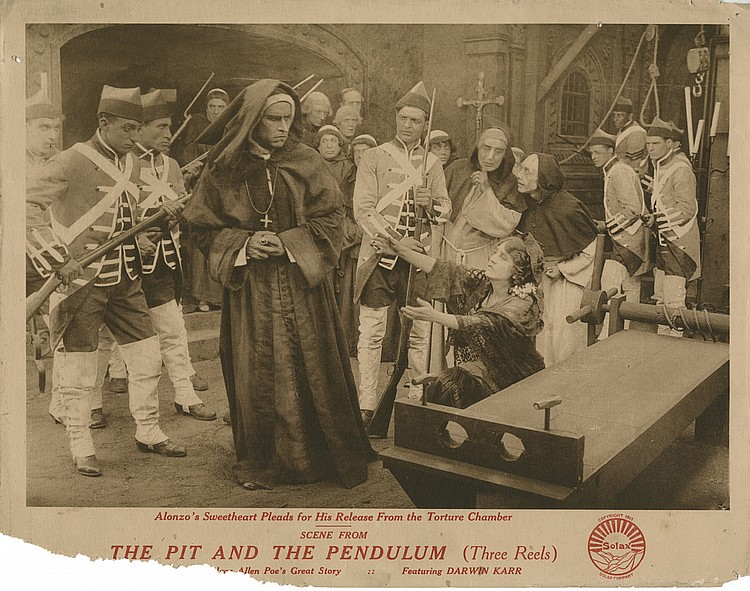
- Lobby card
- Directed by: Alice Guy-Blaché
- Written by: Edgar Allan Poe
- Based on: The Pit and the Pendulum; 1842 story by Edgar Allan Poe
- Produced by: Alice Guy-Blaché
- Starring: Darwin Karr; Fraunie Fraunholz; Blanche Cornwall
- Release date: 1913
- Running time: Unknown
- Country: United States
- Language: Silent

The Pit and the Pendulum is a three-reel film adapted from Edgar Allan Poe's 1842 short story of the same name, directed, and produced by pioneering French filmmaker Alice Guy-Blaché through her American company Solax Studios in 1913.

== Plot ==
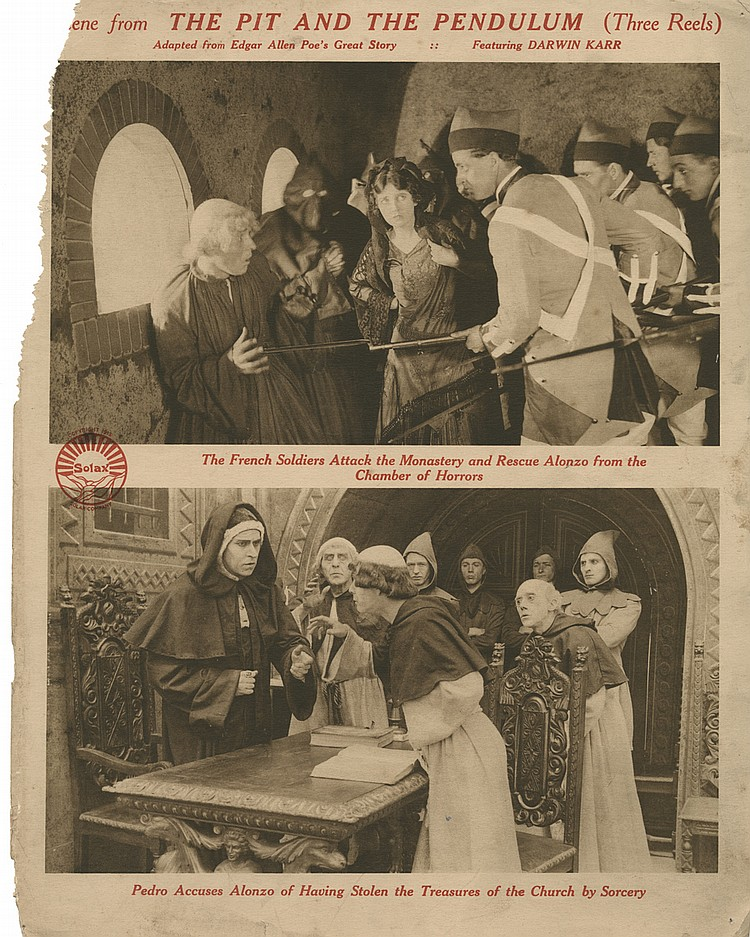
Lobby cards

Using Alice Guy-Blachè's adapted screenplay from the Edgar Allan Poe short story, Alice built upon the lucid and dream-like piece of fiction by adding a significant amount of narrative structure to her adapted screenplay. Rather than having unexplained pain and trauma inflicted upon the film's protagonist, Guy built a narrative surrounding the Spanish Inquisition and the film's protagonist fear. The first reel begins with a young and pretty girl named Isabelle (played by Blanche Cornwall) sitting upon a hill. It is then that she is attacked by Pedro (played by Fraunie Fraunholz). And following the common thematic trajectory of the time, Isabelle is then rescued by the kind and brave medical student who spends his time as a minister for the poor, Alonzo (played by Darwin Karr). Pedro is insistent on revenge and applies to the local monastery where Alonzo works in order to frame him. He hopes to frame him for the mysterious and sudden disappearance of the church's jewels. The frame ends immediately after Pedro plants the jewels in Alonzo's home and the monks are quick to punish Alonzo and Isabelle.

== Cast ==
- Darwin Karr as Alonzo
- Fraunie Fraunholz as Pedro - the Inquisator
- Blanche Cornwall
- Joseph Levering

== Production ==
The gruesome quality of the film proved to be a challenge for not only Guy-Blachè, but the entire cast and crew. There was a large number of rats used throughout filming and they proved to be an ongoing burden throughout the shoot. In Guy Blachè's memoir she recalls Darwin Karr's difficulty with working with the rats. In order to get the rats to chew on a rope that ties down Karr's character in the film's later reels, they smeared food on the ropes to hold the rats position for the camera. However, they quickly grew tired of the food smeared on the rope and began sniffing Karr. Once Guy-Blachè shouted "cut", Karr immediately quipped back in protest and would not agree to do another take.

Following the wrap of the film there was the discussion about what to do with the rats. They isolated the majority of the rats and threw a cat in that immediately jumped back out. They then decided the second best course of action was to throw in a bulldog. But the bulldog proved just as futile as he was attacked by the rats. The only way they were able to finally put in an end to the rats was through cudgeling them.

== Critical reception ==
A lot of critics had a difficult time with the film's gruesome qualities. The New York Dramatic Mirror was one of the many publications that took issue with the film: "There are terrible details in plenty, such as showing rats crawling over the body of a man strapped to a plank that should cause shudder quite as effectually as even's Poe's descriptions".

Moving Picture World said "the sets are remarkably realistic and this is especially true of the dungeon filled monastery, into which the luckless hero is dragged and in which, before he is released, he is tortured with fiendish ingenuity.

== Film recovery ==
The film was initially believed to be completely lost to time; however, there is one surviving reel at the Library of Congress.

== See also ==
- List of incomplete or partially lost films
