= The Mine with the Iron Door =

The Mine with the Iron Door may refer to:

- The Mine with the Iron Door, 1923 novel by Harold Bell Wright
  - The Mine with the Iron Door (1924 film), silent film based on the novel
    - The Mine with the Iron Door (1936 film), remake of the film
