= Falling Leaves (1912 film) =

1912 film by Alice Guy-Blaché

- Directed by: Alice Guy-Blaché
- Produced by: Alice Guy-Blaché
- Starring: See below
- Production company: Solax Studios
- Release date: March 15, 1912
- Running time: 12 minutes
- Country: United States
- Language: Silent (English intertitles)

Falling Leaves is a 1912 American silent drama short film by Alice Guy-Blaché, produced at Solax Studios. Starring Solax stock actors, the story concerns a child's earnest effort to keep her dying sister alive by naive means.

A print of the film is preserved in the Library of Congress.

== Plot ==
Falling Leaves (1912)

In the opening scene, Dr. Headley demonstrates the success of his cure for consumption. He is congratulated by his colleagues.

Meanwhile, it is autumn and Winifred is seriously ill with consumption. Her mother and younger sister, Trixie, are distraught. The family doctor tells Winifred's parents that she will die by the time the last leaf falls. Trixie takes these words literally; after the child is tucked into bed, she sneaks outside and starts tying fallen leaves back on branches with string. Passerby Dr. Headley sees her and learns from her what she is doing. He is led into the house where he administers an injection of his serum cure.

Three months later, Winifred is well on the way to recovery. The beginnings of romance between doctor and patient are depicted in the closing scene.

== Cast ==
- Mace Greenleaf as Dr. Earl Headley, a specialist
- Blanche Cornwall as Mrs. Griswold Thompson
- Marian Swayne as Winifred Thompson
- Magda Foy as Little Trixie Thompson
- Darwin Karr as Mr. Griswold Thompson

== Production ==
The plot of Falling Leaves owes elements to the O. Henry short story "The Last Leaf" (1907). The child hero is a recurring theme in Guy-Blaché films; the first film produced by Solax, A Child's Sacrifice (1910), which also starred Magda Foy, is another example.

When Falling Leaves was made in early 1912, Solax was still operating out of the Flushing studio it rented from Gaumont. The sets were designed by Henri Ménessier, who had worked with Guy-Blaché since 1904. All the primary roles were filled by members of the Solax stock company.

== Release ==
Falling Leaves was released March 15, 1912.

The review in The New York Dramatic Mirror commented on the cast's capability and complimented the production as "developed and played with a compelling naturalness". In a similar vein, Moving Picture News said of the film that the story unfolded "in an atmosphere of delicacy and charming naturalness".

== Preservation ==
A 35mm print of Falling Leaves is in the collection of the Library of Congress, transferred there in 1983 from the Library and Archives Canada where it was part of the Jerome House collection.

In 2004, the National Film Preservation Foundation included Falling Leaves on its second DVD set, a restored print that runs 12 minutes.

The Whitney Museum's 2009–2010 retrospective of Guy-Blaché included a print of Falling Leaves, restored by Dayton Digital Filmworks and with a new score composed by Tamar Muskal.
