= Between Men =

Between Men may refer to:

- Between Men (1935 film), an American Western film
- Between Men (1916 film), an American silent Western film
