= The Velvet Paw =

1916 film by Maurice Tourneur

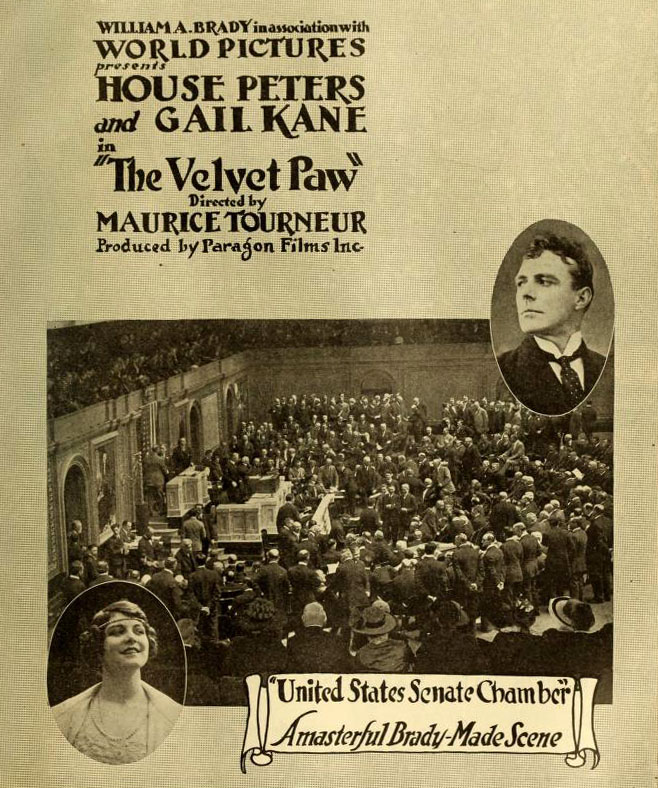
- Directed by: Maurice Tourneur
- Written by: Gardner Hunting; Paul West
- Starring: House Peters; Gail Kane; Ned Burton
- Cinematography: John van den Broek
- Edited by: Clarence Brown
- Production company: Paragon Films
- Distributed by: World Film
- Release date: September 11, 1916
- Country: United States
- Languages: Silent; English intertitles

The Velvet Paw is a lost 1916 American silent drama film directed by Maurice Tourneur and starring House Peters, Gail Kane and Ned Burton. The film offers a critical view of rampant corruption in American politics.

The film's sets were designed by the French-born art director Ben Carré.

== Cast ==
- House Peters as Robert Moorehead
- Gail Kane as Mary Dexter
- Ned Burton as Sen. Barring
- Frank Goldsmith as Congressman Drake
- Charles Mackay as Undetermined role
- Charles Edwards as Undetermined role
- Alex Shannon as Undetermined role

== Bibliography ==
- Waldman, Harry. Maurice Tourneur: The Life and Films. McFarland, 2001.
