= The Danger Game =

The Danger Game may refer to:

- The Danger Game (film), a 1918 American silent film, directed by Snub Pollard
- A 2011 novel written by Kalinda Ashton
