= Man's Woman =

Man's Woman may refer to:

- Man's Woman (1917 film), American silent film
- Man's Woman (1945 film), Swedish film
