= Paul West (playwright) =

American writer (1871–1918)

Paul West (26 January 1871 – 30 October 1918) was an American playwright, lyricist, newspaper editor, journalist, screenwriter, author, and talent agent. After working as a journalist in Massachusetts from 1888 to 1892, he began his career in the theatre as a press representative for Charles H. Hoyt; followed by a season as the business manager for the opera singer and actress Camille D'Arville and the comedian Frank Daniels. From 1898 to 1911 he worked on the editorial staff The New York Sunday World during which time be began a career as a prolific lyricist for both Broadway musicals and Tin Pan Alley publishers of popular song; publishing more the 500 songs during his lifetime. He also worked as a playwright, penning both plays and the books for several musicals. More than 15 of his stage works were mounted on Broadway between the years 1902–1913. In 1904 his children's book The Pearl and the Pumpkin was published; a work which he later adapted into a 1905 musical.

In the later years of his life, West was dedicated to writing screenplays for silent films; penning the stories for more than 100 films; sometimes under the pseudonym Bill Blunder. In 1918 he served in the American Red Cross at the Battle of Château-Thierry among other work at the Front, and later that year committed suicide in Paris.

== Life and career ==
Paul West was born on 26 January 1871 in Boston, Massachusetts. His early education was received at the Boston Latin School. This was followed by further education at the Peekskill Military Academy from which he graduated in 1888. Following graduation he began a career as a journalist, working for several different newspapers in the cities of Boston and Lawrence, Massachusetts from 1888 to 1892.

West's first foray into the theatre world was in the position of press representative for Charles H. Hoyt's theatrical enterprises in 1893–1894. He then worked for a year as the business manager for the opera singer and actress Camille D'Arville and the comedian Frank Daniels. In 1885 he married Miss Jane V. Carrigan of Cambridge, Massachusetts with whom he would have a son and a daughter.

In 1897 West moved with his family to New York City when he took a position as a journalist for the New York Evening Journal. He left that post in 1898 to join the editorial staff of The New York Sunday World; a position he remained in until 1911. Simultaneously, he worked as a prolific lyricist in New York, writing words to over 500 published songs; many of them made for Broadway musicals, but also for Tin Pan Alley publishers of popular music. He also wrote the books for multiple musicals and plays, many of which were staged on Broadway from 1902 to 1913. He was also a prolific screenwriter in the last years of his life, writing the stories for more than 100 silent films.

During the latter part of World War I, West served with the American Red Cross in France and was on the front line at the Battle of Château-Thierry in that capacity. Having left a note, he committed suicide in Paris by jumping off a bridge into the Seine on 30 October 1918.

== Partial list of works ==
=== Stage works ===
- Tommy Rot (1902, co-wrote book with Rupert Hughes, Joseph W. Herbert, and Kirke La Shelle; music and lyrics by Safford Waters)
- The White Hen, musical (1907, lyrics co-written by West and Roderic C. Penfield; music by Gustave Kerker)
- The Follies of 1907, musical revue, (1907, West was one of many contributing lyricists to the very first Ziegfeld Follies)
- The-Merry-Go-Round, musical, (1908, lyrics by West; book by Edgar Smith; music by Gus Edwards)
- The Red Petticoat, musical, (1912; book and lyrics co-authored by West and Rida Johnson Young; music by Jerome Kern)
- The Tik-Tok Man of Oz, musical, (1913, wrote lyrics for the song "One! Two! Three! All Over")

=== Films ===
- Crooky (1915)
- The Velvet Paw (1916)
- The American Consul (1917)
- On Record (1917)
- Great Expectations (1917)
- A Girl Like That (1917)
- A Mormon Maid (1917)
- The Safety Curtain (1918)

=== Short stories ===
- Short Letters of a Small Boy

=== Books ===
- The Pearl and the Pumpkin, children's book (1904)
