= Thunderbolts of Fate =

1919 silent film

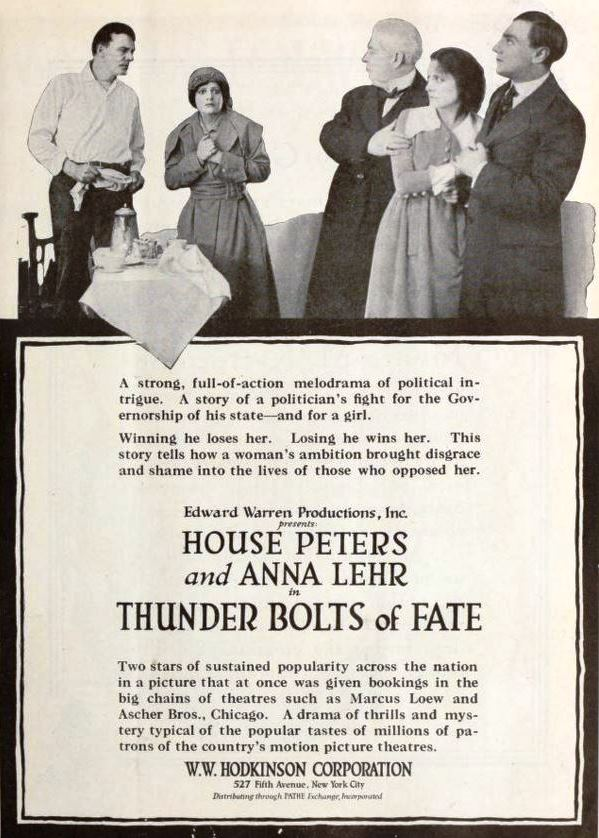
- Directed by: Edward Warren
- Written by: Winifred Dunn; H.S. Sheldon
- Produced by: Edward Warren
- Starring: House Peters; Anna Lehr; Ned Burton
- Cinematography: Edward Earle
- Production company: Edward Warren Productions
- Distributed by: Hodkinson Pictures; Pathe Exchange
- Release date: April 6, 1919
- Running time: 50 minutes
- Country: United States
- Languages: Silent; English intertitles

Thunderbolts of Fate is a 1919 American silent drama film directed by Edward Warren and starring House Peters, Anna Lehr and Ned Burton.The film opened in April of 1919 at Loew's New York Theatre.

== Cast ==
- House Peters as Robert Wingfield
- Anna Lehr as Eleanor Brewster
- Ned Burton as Sen. Brewster
- Wilfred Lytell as Clifford Brewster
- Ben Lewin as Edward Brewster
- Henry Sedley as Howard Lennox
- Corene Uzzell as Adele Hampton

== Bibliography ==
- Paul C. Spehr & Gunnar Lundquist. American Film Personnel and Company Credits, 1908-1920. McFarland, 1996.
