= The Combat (1926 film) =

1926 film

- Directed by: Lynn Reynolds
- Written by: J. G. Hawks; Edward J. Montagne
- Produced by: Carl Laemmle
- Starring: House Peters; Wanda Hawley; Walter McGrail
- Cinematography: Charles J. Stumar
- Production company: Universal Pictures
- Distributed by: Universal Pictures
- Release date: March 28, 1926
- Running time: 70 minutes
- Country: United States
- Language: Silent (English intertitles)

The Combat is a 1926 American silent Western film directed by Lynn Reynolds and starring House Peters, Wanda Hawley, and Walter McGrail. A print of The Combat exists in the UCLA Film & Television Archive.

== Plot ==
As described in a film magazine review, two-fisted lumberjack Blaze Burke is made boss of Jerry Flint's logging camp and proceeds to eliminate an opposition gang of huskies led by Red McLaughlin. Double-crossed by Milton Symmons, he takes the latter's prospective bride Alice Childers to a lonely cabin. Trailed by McLaughlin, they fight with McLaughlin falling over a cliff to his death. Blaze restores Alice to Milton. Subsequently, he saves Alice from a forest fire but Milton perishes in it. In the end, Blaze wins the affections of Alice.

== Cast ==
- House Peters as Blaze Burke
- Wanda Hawley as Alice Childers
- Walter McGrail as Milton Symmons
- C.E. Anderson as Red McLaughlin
- Charles Hill Mailes as Jeremiah 'Jerry' Flint
- Steve Clemente as Halfbreed
- Howard Truesdale as Sheriff
