= The Safety Curtain =

1918 film by Sidney Franklin

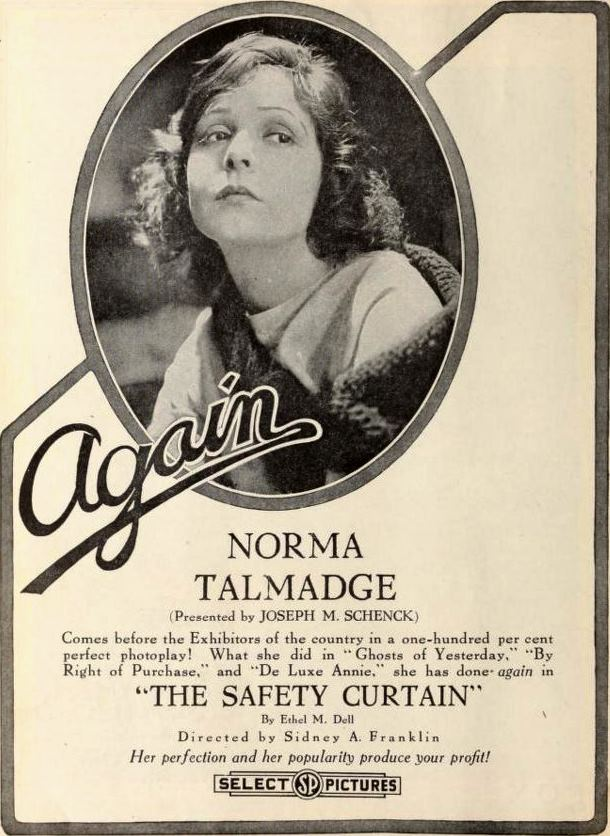
- Advertisement in the trade journal Exhibitors Herald
- Directed by: Sidney Franklin
- Written by: Sidney Franklin; Paul West
- Based on: "The Safety Curtain" by Ethel M. Dell
- Produced by: Norma Talmadge; Joseph M. Schenck
- Cinematography: Albert Moses; Ed Weynard
- Production company: Norma Talmadge Film Corporation
- Distributed by: Select Pictures
- Release date: July 10, 1918
- Running time: 6 reels
- Country: United States
- Language: Silent (English intertitles)

The Safety Curtain is a 1918 American silent melodrama film directed by Sidney Franklin and starring Norma Talmadge. Talmadge and her husband Joe Schenck produced the film and distributed through Select Pictures.

== Cast ==
- Norma Talmadge as Puck
- Eugene O'Brien as Captain Merryon
- Anders Randolf as Vulcan (credited as Anders Randolph)
- Gladden James as Sylvester
- Lillian Hall as Ballet Girl

== Preservation status ==
This film is preserved at EYE Institut, aka Filmmuseum in the Netherlands and at UCLA Film and Television Archive.
