= Crooky =

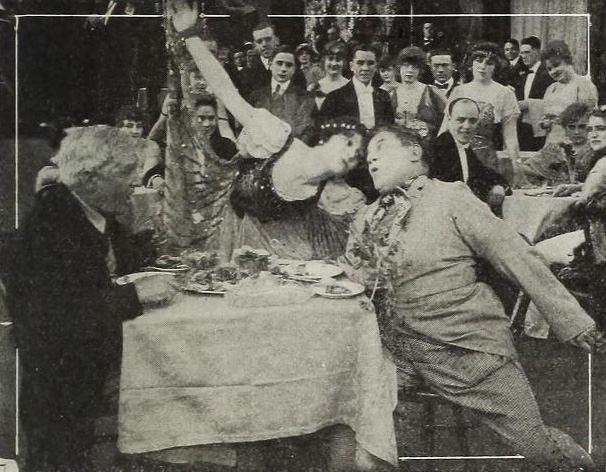
- Crooky (Frank Daniels), stage right, breaks into cafe life
- Directed by: C. Jay Williams
- Written by: Paul West
- Based on: the play, Crooky Scruggs by Paul West
- Produced by: Albert E. Smith; J. Stuart Blackton
- Starring: Frank Daniels; Charles Eldridge; Harry T. Morey
- Cinematography: William T. Stuart
- Production company: Vitagraph
- Distributed by: V-L-S-E, Inc.
- Release date: July 12, 1915 (US)
- Running time: 5 reels
- Country: United States
- Language: English

Crooky is a 1915 American silent film written by Paul West, directed by C. J. Williams, and starring Frank Daniels, Charles Eldridge and Harry T. Morey. It was Daniels screen debut. While initial reviews were polite, the film quickly disappeared from the trade press and Daniels' persona became critiqued in other feature comedies as overly broad or immoral. The original title was Crooky Scruggs, but during its theatrical run, the title was shortened to Crooky.

== Plot ==
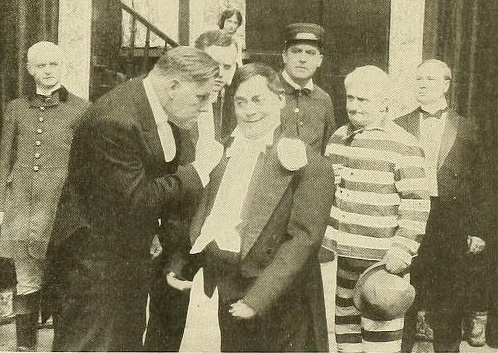
Screen shot from the film

Crooky Scruggs is a criminal, currently a guest of the state residing in Sing Sing Prison. He is planning to escape and then does so, through hiding in a barrel. After his escape, he steals a suit of clothes to cover his prison garb, and makes his way to New York City. Meanwhile, Colonel Bob Roberts is a wealthy rancher from America's west. He comes to New York with the intention of finding a good investment by which he can greatly increase his wealth. He is carrying a letter of introduction to John Dough, but when he arrives at Dough's office, his secretary, Jack Willis, refuses him an audience. He leaves the letter and heads to his hotel. On the way there, he runs into Crooky, and the two hit it off and become friendly. Eventually, the two go back to Roberts' hotel, where Crooky spends the night in Robert's room.

Waking first, Crooky takes Robert's clothes and money and leaves. Back at Dough's office, Willis reads Roberts' letter of introduction to Dough. In need of an infusion of cash to save a railroad deal he is working on, he tracks Roberts down to his hotel. Hopping in a car, he arrives at the hotel, just as Crooky is exiting. Mistaking Crooky for Roberts,

Exiting the hotel, he runs into Dough, who has tracked Roberts back to his hotel. He mistakes Crooky for Roberts and brings him back to his office. There, he gives Dough the check Roberts had brought with him to invest. While there, he meets Dough's sister, Susan, and his daughter, Dora. He begins to flirt with Susan, and gets invited back to their house, where there is a party being thrown.

Meanwhile, back at the hotel the police arrive, and believing Roberts is Crooky, take him into custody. As he attempts to prove his innocence, Crooky is at the party, where Susan has learned the truth about Crooky, but has decided to marry him and reform him. Crooky wants no part in marriage, and decides the time is right for him to slip away. Just before he makes his escape he can't taking Susan's jewels with him. Roberts has convinced the police of their case of mistaken identity. Taking the police with him, they head to arrest Crooky at Dough's house. However, Crooky has slipped away, and he returns to prison, before he can be arrested for stealing Susan's jewels.

== Cast list ==
- Frank Daniels as Crooky Scruggs
- Charles Eldridge as Colonel Bob Roberts
- Harry T. Morey as John W. Dough
- Edwina Robbins as Susan Dough
- Anna Laughlin as Dora Dough
- Evart Overton as Jack Willis

== Production ==
In April 1915 Crooky Scruggs (the original title of the film) began to be promoted by Vitagraph. C.J. Williams was announced as the director, with the star being Frank Daniels. It was Daniels' film debut. On May 1, Vitagraph published the release dates for its films from May through July. Crooky Scruggs was scheduled for release the week of July 12. A month before the film was released, Daniels admitted that he regretted not having appeared in films prior to this picture. The release date of July 12 was confirmed in early July when it was published that the film was to be added to Vitagraph's July lineup. By August, the film was being referred to as simply Crooky, and by September it was being advertised under that abbreviated name.

== Reception ==
Motion Picture News gave the film a positive review, saying "it surely is a comedy and a good one." They especially enjoyed Daniel's performance stating, "Anyone who doesn't laugh at his antics is joy-proof." They ended their review by saying, "'Crooky Scruggs' will live long in the hearts of those who care for good farce comedy." Motography also gave the film an excellent review, stating the performances of all the cast were exemplary, but giving particular accolades to Daniels, stating that he "deserves the laurels which he has won in comic opera." They also praised the direction of C. Jay Williams. Moving Picture World called the picture "excellent", extolling the performance by Daniels, who they felt the role was made for. They also complimented the rest of the cast, calling them "first rate".
