= Pay Your Dues =

1919 film

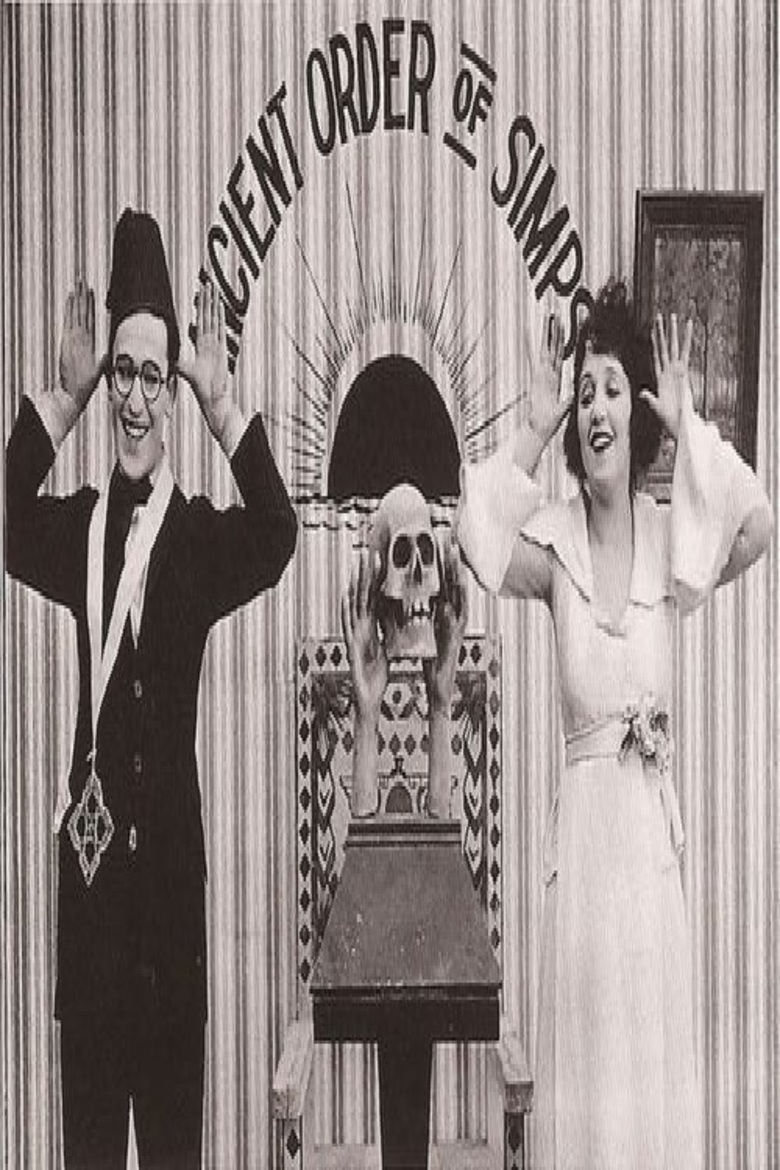
- Directed by: Vincent P. Bryan; Hal Roach
- Written by: H. M. Walker
- Produced by: Hal Roach
- Starring: Harold Lloyd
- Cinematography: Walter Lundin
- Release date: October 12, 1919
- Running time: 12 minutes
- Country: United States
- Languages: Silent; English intertitles

Pay Your Dues is a 1919 American silent short comedy film featuring Harold Lloyd. A print of the film survives in the UCLA Film & Television Archive.

== Plot ==
A chapter of the Ancient Order of Simps lodge is initiating three new members who each must undergo a rough hazing. All three candidates are blindfolded. Just before the third man is supposed to go through his initiation ritual, he takes advantage of his guard dozing off. He lifts his blindfold and, through a keyhole of a locked door, observes the second candidate, a tiny man, being thoroughly abused. Unwilling to endure such an ordeal, the third man decides to escape through a window. Still wearing a blindfold, he is hotly pursued by the lodge's members. The fleeing man runs through a park where The Boy has been enjoying the female company of Bebe and about a dozen of her friends. When the man encounters The Boy, by a remarkable coincidence, The Boy is also blindfolded as part of a game. The pursuing lodge members mistake The Boy for the escaped candidate and forcibly haul him back to the lodge for "his" initiation rites. With the aid of trickery, The Boy, blindfolded, is made to think he is climbing a tall building, walking on a ledge, and being attacked by a vicious dog. Bebe and her friends attempt to rescue The Boy, but by the time they arrive at the lodge and overpower Snub, The Boy has successfully endured his initiation ordeal and happily joins the Ancient Order of Simps.

== Cast ==
- Harold Lloyd as The Boy
- Snub Pollard
- Bebe Daniels
- Sammy Brooks
- Lige Conley (as Lige Cromley)
- Frank Daniels
- William Gillespie
- Charles Inslee
- Mark Jones
- Dee Lampton
- Gus Leonard
- Earl Mohan
- Marie Mosquini
- Fred C. Newmeyer (as Fred C. Newmeyer)
- H.L. O'Connor
- Robert Emmett O'Connor
- Charles Stevenson (as Charles E. Stevenson)
- Chase Thorne
- Noah Young

== See also ==
- Harold Lloyd filmography
