= House Peters =

American actor

House Peters Sr.
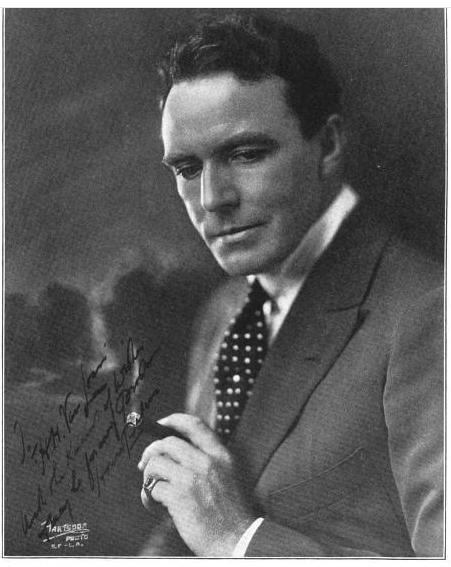
- Peters Sr., 1922
- Born: Robert House Peters; 12 March 1880; Bristol, England
- Died: 7 December 1967 (aged 87); Woodland Hills, California, US
- Burial place: Cremated at Forest Lawn Memorial Park, Glendale
- Occupation: Actor
- Years active: 1900s–1950s
- Spouse: Mae King (m. 1914)

Robert House Peters Sr. (12 March 1880 – 7 December 1967) was a British-born American silent film actor, known to filmgoers of the era as "The Star of a Thousand Emotions".

== Biography ==
Born in Bristol, Gloucestershire, England, Peters began his stage career in Australia, after working for several years in its mining industry. In the U.S., his film career began on a high note, playing the handsome leading man in In the Bishop's Carriage (1913), co-starring Mary Pickford. While The Bishop's Carriage was filmed in an East Coast studio, Peters was in Los Angeles by 1914, becoming one of the first screen stars to permanently settle there. Although he stated publicly that he preferred playing villains, Peters, curly haired and pleasantly dimpled, was from the outset typecast as the romantic hero.

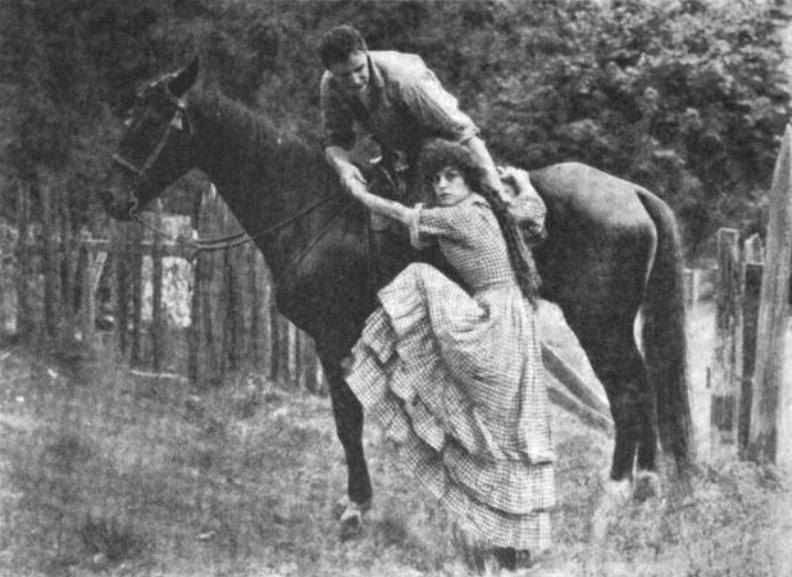
Peters lifts Beatriz Michelena onto his horse in Salomy Jane (1914)

After enjoying his greatest success as the good-bad hero of The Girl of the Golden West (1915), Peters' career peaked in the early 1920s. He signed with Universal Studios for six films in 1924, hoping for a comeback. The results, however, were mostly mediocre and he was soon demoted to supporting roles. Retired after 1928's Rose Marie, Peters returned for a guest appearance in The Old West, a 1952 Gene Autry film that also featured his son, House Peters Jr., who subsequently enjoyed a lengthy film career portraying villains as well as Procter and Gamble's Mr. Clean character in cleaning product commercials from the late 1950s into the '60s.

=== Personal life ===
Peters was married to actress Mae King in 1914 with whom he had three children, Gregg, Patricia and Robert Jr., who subsequently used the stage name House Peters Jr. Peters was 87 when he died of pneumonia at the Motion Picture Country House and Hospital in Woodland Hills, California.

== Filmography ==
Year	Title	Role	Notes
1913	In the Bishop's Carriage	Obermuller	
1913	Chelsea 7750	Prof. Grimble	
1913	An Hour Before Dawn	Kate's Father - the Ex-Detective	
1913	The Port of Doom	Kate's Father	
1913	Leah Kleschna	Paul Sylvain	
1913	A Lady of Quality	The Duke of Osmonde	
1914	The Pride of Jennico	Basil Jennico	
1914	Clothes	Arnold West	
1914	The Brute	Billy West	Short
1914	Salomy Jane	The Man	
1914	Mrs. Wiggs of the Cabbage Patch	Bob	
1915	The Girl of the Golden West	Ramerrez	
1915	Mignon	Wilhelm Meister	
1915	The Warrens of Virginia	Ned Burton	
1915	The Unafraid	Stefan Balsic	Short
1915	The Captive	Muhamud Hassan	
1915	Stolen Goods	Richard Carlton	
1915	Between Men	Gregg Lewiston	
1915	The Winged Idol	Jack Leonard	
1915	The Great Divide	Stephen Ghent	
1916	The Hand of Peril	James Kestner	
1916	The Closed Road	Frank Sargeant	
1916	The Rail Rider	Jim Lewis	
1916	The Velvet Paw	Robert Moorehead	
1917	Happiness of Three Women	Billy Craig	
1917	As Men Love	Paul Russell	
1917	The Lonesome Chap	Stuart Kirkwood	
1917	The Highway of Hope	Steve King	
1917	The Heir of the Ages	Hugh Payne	
1919	The Forfeit	Jeffrey Masters	
1919	Thunderbolts of Fate	Robert Wingfield	
1919	You Never Know Your Luck	J.G. Kerry	
1920	The Great Redeemer	Dan Malloy	
1920	The Leopard Woman	John Culbertson	
1920	Isobel or The Trail's End	Sgt. William MacVeigh	
1920	Silk Husbands and Calico Wives	Deane Kendall	
1921	Lying Lips	Blair Cornwall	
1921	The Invisible Power	Sid Chambers	
1921	The Man from Lost River	Barnes	
1922	The Storm	Burr Winton	
1922	Rich Men's Wives	John Masters	
1922	Human Hearts	Tom Logan	
1923	Lost and Found on a South Sea Island	Capt. Blackbird	
1923	Don't Marry for Money	Peter Smith	
1923	Held to Answer	John Hampstead	
1924	The Tornado	Tornado	
1925	Head Winds	Peter Rosslyn	
1925	Raffles, the Amateur Cracksman	Raffles, the Amateur Cracksman	
1925	The Storm Breaker	John Strong	
1925	Counsel for the Defense	Arnold Peters	
1926	The Combat	Blaze Burke	
1926	Prisoners of the Storm	'Bucky' Malone	
1928	Rose-Marie	Sergeant Malone	
1952	The Old West	Parson Jonathan Brooks	
1952	O. Henry's Full House	Dave Bascom	(segment "The Clarion Call"), Uncredited
1953	Treasure of the Golden Condor	Magistrate	Uncredited, (final film role)
