= Maude Fealy =

American actress (1883–1971)

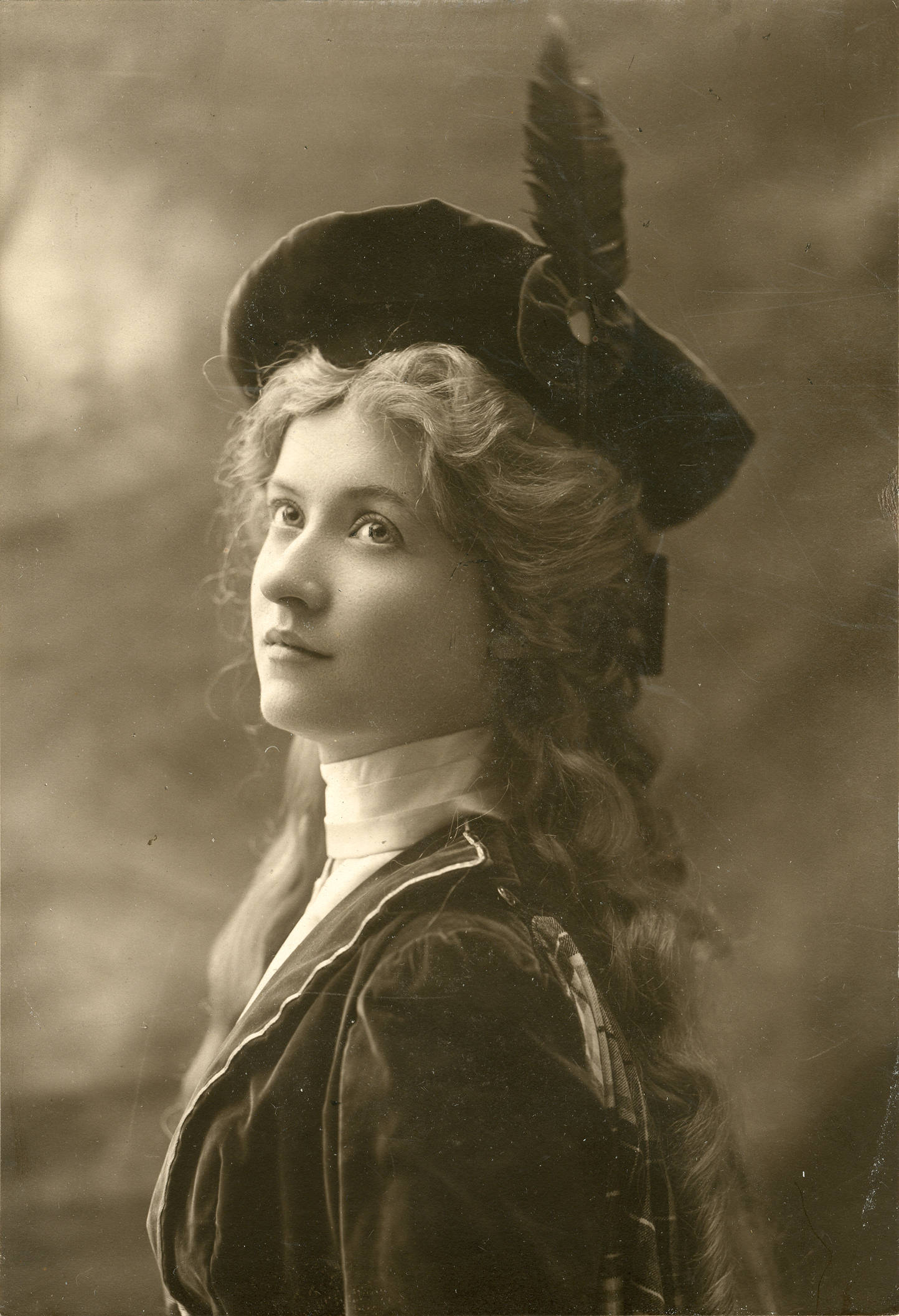
- Fealy in 1905
- Born: Maude Mary Hawk; March 4, 1883; Memphis, Tennessee, U.S.
- Died: November 9, 1971 (aged 88); Woodland Hills, California, U.S.
- Resting place: Hollywood Forever Cemetery
- Occupation: Actress
- Years active: 1886–1958
- Spouses: Louis Hugo Sherwin (m. 1907; div. 1909) James Durkin (m. 1909; div. 1917) John Cort, Jr. (m. 1920; ann. 1923)

Maude Fealy (born Maude Mary Hawk; March 4, 1883 – November 9, 1971) was an American stage and silent film actress whose career survived into the sound era.

== Early life ==
Maude Mary Hawk was born on March 4, 1883 in Memphis, Tennessee, the daughter of actress Margaret Fealey and James Hawk.

In 1896, she made her debut at the Elitch Theatre playing various children's roles. Her first appearance was during the week of July 19 in Henry Churchill de Mille's The Lost Paradise. In 1905, Churchill de Mille's son Cecil B. DeMille was hired as a stock player at Elitch Theatre, and Fealy appeared as the featured actress in several plays. Their friendship continued for decades, including when DeMille cast Fealy in his film The Ten Commandments.

Fealy made her Broadway debut in the 1900 production of Quo Vadis, again with her mother.

Fealy toured England with William Gillette in Sherlock Holmes from 1901 to 1902. Between 1902 and 1905, she frequently toured with Sir Henry Irving's company in the United Kingdom, and by 1907, she was the star in touring productions in the United States.

Fealy, c. 1900

== Career ==
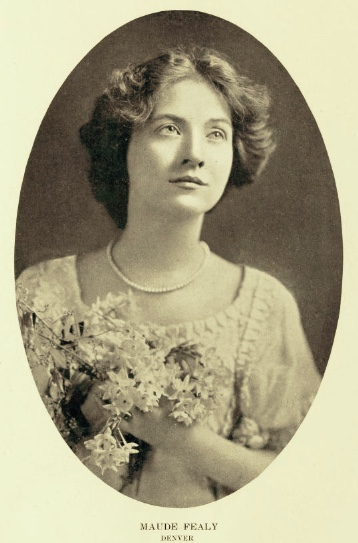
Fealy featured in Representative Women of Colorado, 1914

Fealy appeared in her first silent film in 1911 for Thanhouser Studios, making another 18 between then and 1917, after which she did not perform in film for another 14 years. During the summers of 1912 and 1913, she organized and starred with the Fealy-Durkin Company that put on performances at the Casino Theatre at Lakeside Amusement Park in Denver and the following year began touring the western half of the U.S.

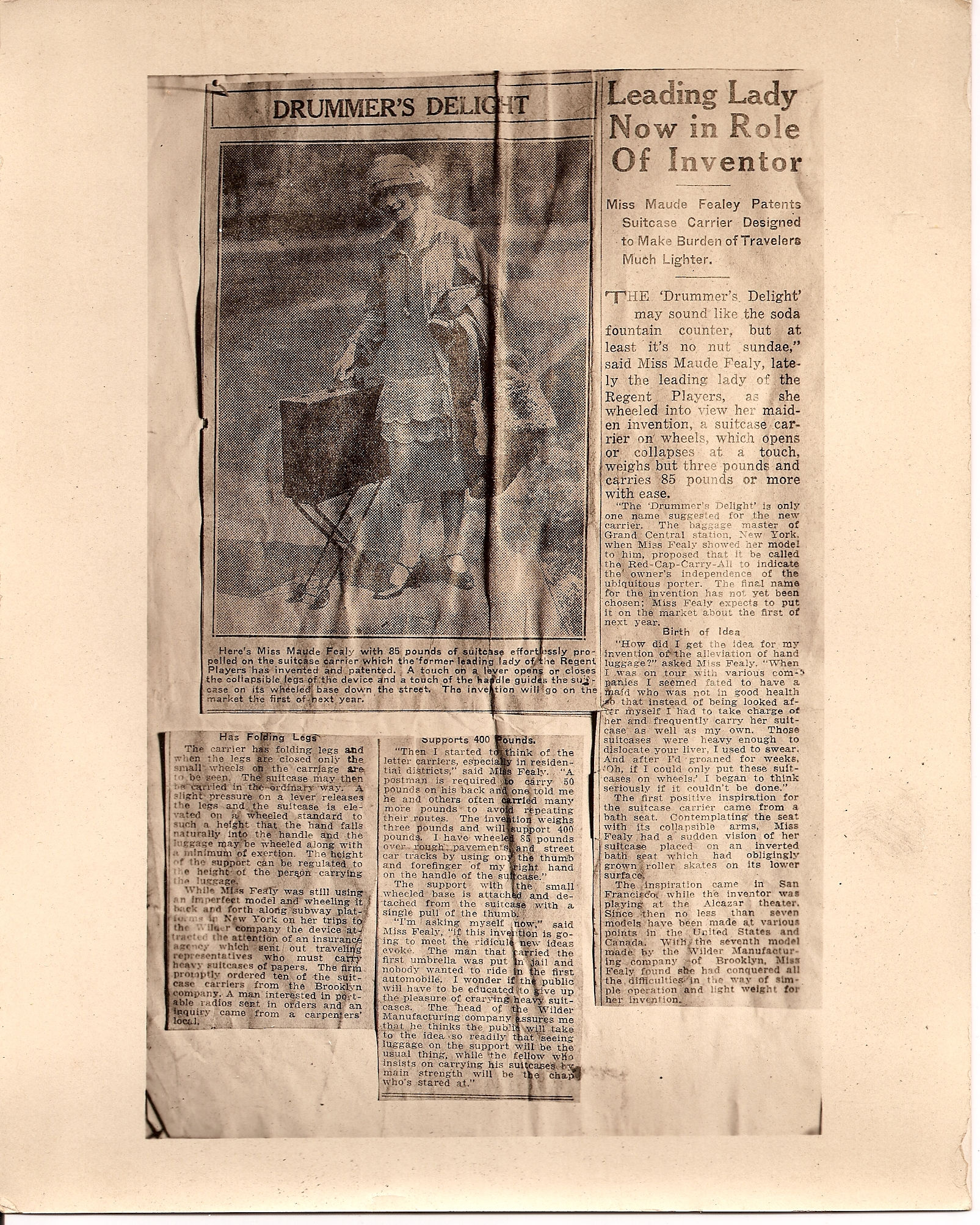
Article about Fealy's invention and play.

Fealy had some commercial success as a playwright-performer. She co-wrote The Red Cap with Grant Stewart (playwright), a noted New York playwright and performer, which ran at the National Theatre in Chicago in August 1928. Though she was not in the cast of that production, the play's plot revolves around the invention of a wheeled luggage carrier ostensibly invented by Fealy. A newspaper article reporting on the invention may be genuine, or may be a publicity stunt created to promote the play. Other plays written or co-written by Fealy include At Midnight, and with the highly regarded Chicago playwright Alice Gerstenberg, The Promise.

Throughout her career, Fealy taught acting in many cities where she lived; early with her mother, under names which included Maude Fealy Studio of Speech, Fealy School of Stage and Screen Acting, Fealy School of Dramatic Expression. She taught in Grand Rapids, Michigan; Burbank, California; and Denver, Colorado. By the 1930s, she was living in Los Angeles where she became involved in the Federal Theatre Project and at age 50 returned to secondary roles in film, including a credited appearance in The Ten Commandments (1956). Later in her career, she wrote and appeared in pageants, programs, and presented lectures for schools and community organizations.

== Personal life ==
In Denver, Colorado, Fealy met a drama critic from a local newspaper named Louis Hugo Sherwin (son of opera singer Amy Sherwin). The two married in secret on July 15, 1907, because, as they expected, her domineering mother did not approve. The couple soon separated and divorced in Denver in 1909. Fealy then married actor James Peter Durkin. He was a silent film director with Adolph Zukor's Famous Players Film Company. This marriage ended in divorce for non-support in 1917. Soon after this, Fealy married John Edward Cort. This third marriage ended in a 1923 annulment and was her last marriage. She bore no children in any of the marriages.

== Death ==
Fealy died on November 10, 1971, aged 88, at the Motion Picture & Television Country House and Hospital in Woodland Hills, California. She was interred in the Abbey of the Psalms Mausoleum at Hollywood Forever Cemetery.

== Filmography ==
(Per AFI database)

- King Rene's Daughter (1913) as Princess Iolante
- Moths (1913) as Vere
- The Legend of Provence (1913) as Sister Angela
- Frou Frou (1914) as Frou Frou
- Pamela Congreve (1914) as Pamela Congreve
- The Woman Pays (1914, scenario by Maude Fealy) as Margaret Watson
- Bondwomen (1915) as Norma Ellis
- The Immortal Flame (1916) as Ada Forbes
- Pamela's Past (1917) as Pamela Congreve
- The American Consul (1917) as Joan Kitwell
- Laugh and Get Rich (1931) as Miss Teasdale
- Smashing the Vice Trust (1937)
- Race Suicide (1938)
- The Buccaneer (1938) as Wife (uncredited)
- Bulldog Drummond's Peril (1938) as Spinster (uncredited)
- Union Pacific (1939) as Woman (uncredited)
- Emergency Squad (1940) as Mother (uncredited)
- Seventeen (1940) as Woman Driver (uncredited)
- Gaslight (1944) Bit Part (uncredited)
- The Unfaithful (1947) as Old Maid in Montage (uncredited)
- A Double Life (1947) as Woman (uncredited)
- The Ten Commandments (1956) as Slave Woman / Hebrew at Crag and Corridor
- The Buccaneer (1958) as Townswoman (uncredited)
