= The American Consul =

1917 drama silent film

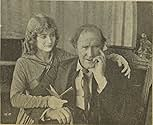
- Film still
- Directed by: Rollin S. Sturgeon
- Screenplay by: Thomas J. Geraghty; Harvey F. Thew; Paul West
- Produced by: Jesse L. Lasky
- Starring: Theodore Roberts; Ernest Joy; Maude Fealy; Charles West; Raymond Hatton; Tom Forman
- Cinematography: Harold Rosson
- Production company: Jesse L. Lasky Feature Play Company
- Distributed by: Paramount Pictures
- Release date: February 15, 1917
- Running time: 50 minutes
- Country: United States
- Language: Silent (English intertitles)

The American Consul is a 1917 American silent drama film directed by Rollin S. Sturgeon and written by Thomas J. Geraghty, Harvey F. Thew and Paul West. The film stars Theodore Roberts, Ernest Joy, Maude Fealy, Charles West, Raymond Hatton and Tom Forman. The film was released on February 15, 1917, by Paramount Pictures.

== Cast ==
- Theodore Roberts as Abel Manning
- Ernest Joy as Senator James Kitwell
- Maude Fealy as Joan Kitwell
- Charles West as Pedro Gonzales
- Raymond Hatton as President Cavillo
- Tom Forman as Geoffrey Daniels

== Preservation status ==
Copies are preserved in the Library of Congress collection Packard Campus for Audio-Visual Conservation and the British Film and Television Archive, London.
