= The Forfeit =

1919 film

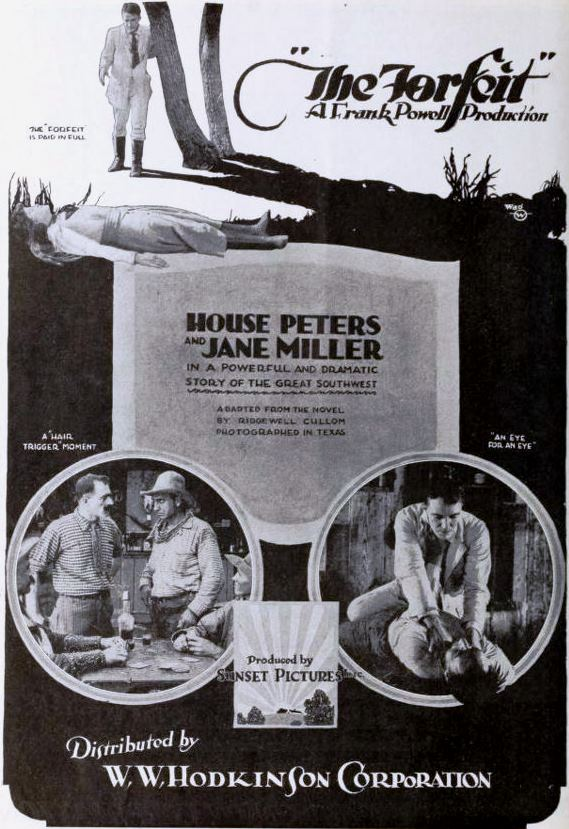
- Directed by: Frank Powell
- Written by: Ridgwell Cullum (novel); Frank Powell
- Based on: The Purchase Price by Ridgwell Cullum
- Starring: House Peters; Jane Miller; William Human
- Cinematography: Arthur Boeger; Percy Higginson
- Production company: Sunset Pictures
- Distributed by: Hodkinson Pictures; Pathé Exchange
- Release date: March 10, 1919
- Running time: 50 minutes
- Country: United States
- Languages: Silent; English intertitles

The Forfeit is a lost 1919 American silent Western film directed by Frank Powell and starring House Peters, Jane Miller and William Human.

== Cast ==
- House Peters as Jeffrey Masters
- Jane Miller as Elvine Van Blooren
- William Human as Bob Whitstone
- Hector V. Sarno as Sikem Bruce
- L.H. Welles as Bud Tristram
- Blanche Abbott as Nan Tristram
- George Murdock as Dug McFarlane

== Preservation ==
With no holdings located in archives, The Forfeit is considered a lost film.

== Bibliography ==
- Goble, Alan. The Complete Index to Literary Sources in Film. Walter de Gruyter, 1999.
