= Florence Bindley =

American vaudeville and music hall performer (1868–1951)

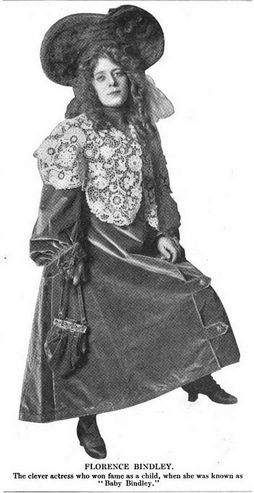
Florence Bindley, from a 1904 publication.

Florence Bindley (July 24, 1868 – May 14, 1951) was an American musical theatre, vaudeville, and music hall performer.

== Early life ==
Florence J. Elmer was from Newark, New Jersey, but was raised partly in England. She started on stage at age 3, as "Baby Bindley", dancing and playing novelty instruments made by her father. At age 6, she performed for Queen Victoria.

== Career ==
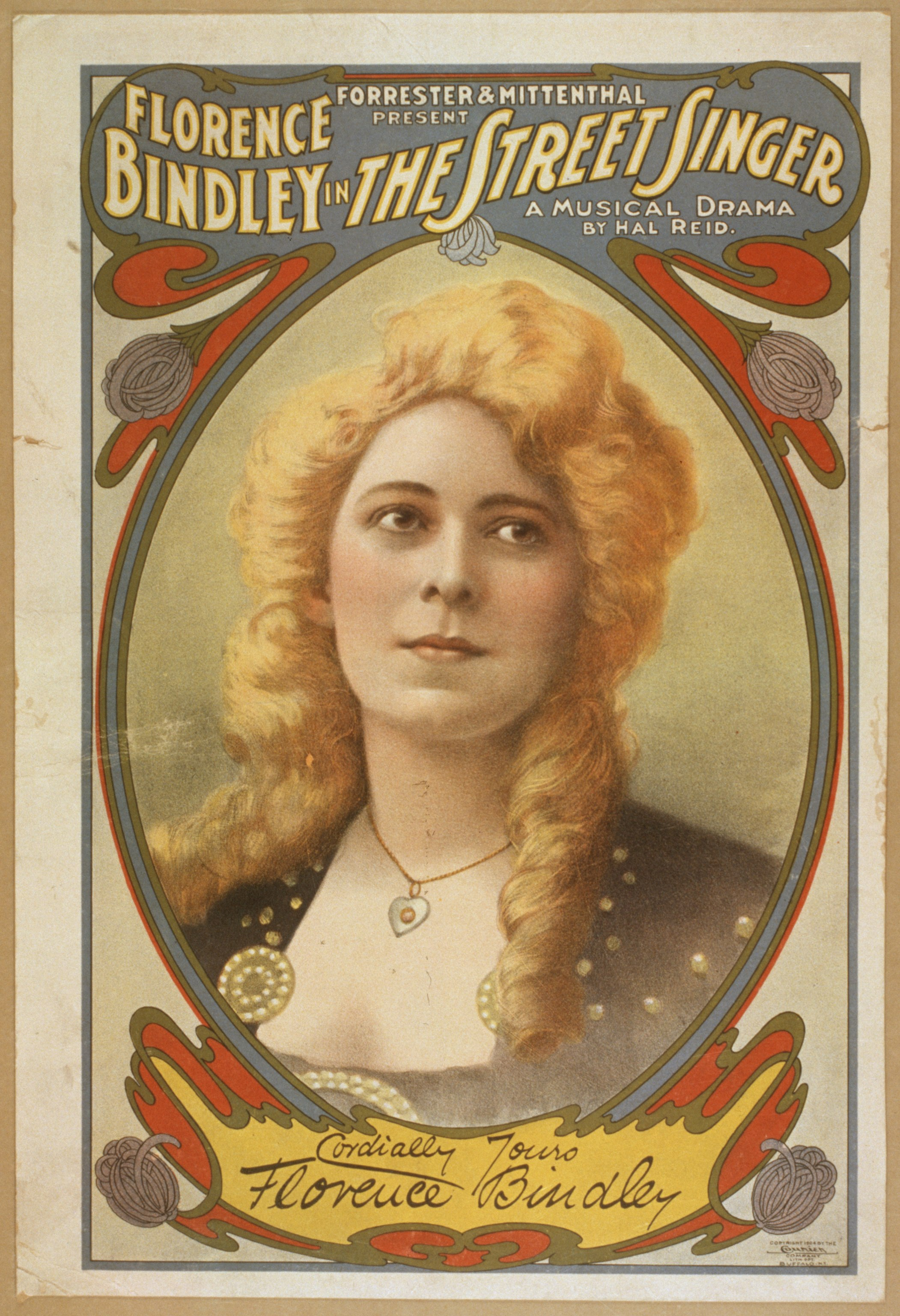
Poster for Florence Bindley in the Broadway production of The Street Singer by Hal Reid (1904)

Bindley appeared on Broadway and in variety shows, including Heroine in Rags (1887), The Pay Train (1892), Captain's Mate (1894), A Midnight Marriage (1904), The Street Singer (1904), The Belle of the West (1905), The Girl and the Gambler (1906), In the Nick of Time (1908), and Major Meg (1916), which included a display of "her famous zylophone specialty." "She is at all times charming, magnetic, and possesses a beautiful singing voice," commented the Pittsburgh Press in 1904, "together with marked emotional and comedy ability." She was billed as "The Girl with the Diamond Dress," for an unusual costume she wore, first on the vaudeville stage and later in The Street Singer. A later vaudeville act of Bindley's, "An Afternoon at Home" (1909), featured musical monologues, singing and dancing.

== Personal life ==
Florence Elmer married twice. Her first marriage, to her cousin Edward Everett Bindley, ended in divorce in 1890. She remarried to silent film actor Darwin Karr by 1910. She was widowed when he died in 1945. Florence Bindley died in 1951, aged 82 years, in Los Angeles, California.
