= Ned Burton =

American actor

- Born: c. 1850
- Died: December 11, 1922; New York, New York; United States
- Occupation: Actor
- Years active: 1913-1922 (film)

Ned Burton (c. 1850–1922) was an American stage and film actor of the silent era.

== Selected filmography ==
- The Man of the Hour (1914)
- The Fat Man's Burden (1914)
- Hogan's Alley (1914)
- The Velvet Paw (1916)
- Man's Woman (1917)
- The Danger Game (1918)
- Ruler of the Road (1918)
- Thunderbolts of Fate (1919)
- Thou Shalt Not (1919)
- A Daughter of Two Worlds (1920)
- Tarnished Reputations (1920)

== Bibliography ==
- Waldman, Harry. Maurice Tourneur: The Life and Films. McFarland, 2001.
