= The Storm (1922 film) =

1922 film by Reginald Barker

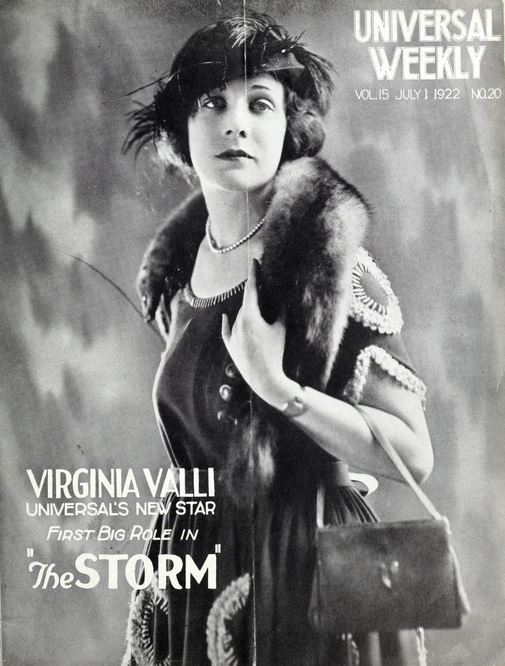
- Valli on the cover of Universal Weekly
- Directed by: Reginald Barker
- Written by: J. G. Hawks; Darryl F. Zanuck
- Based on: Men Without Skirts by Langdon McCormick
- Produced by: Carl Laemmle
- Cinematography: Percy Hilburn (French)
- Distributed by: Universal Pictures
- Release date: June 18, 1922; (AFI September 4, 1922)
- Running time: 8 reels
- Country: United States
- Language: Silent (English intertitles)

The Storm is a 1922 American silent northwoods melodrama film directed by Reginald Barker and starring Virginia Valli, Matt Moore, and House Peters. It was produced and distributed by Universal Pictures.

== Plot ==
As described in a film magazine review, two men and a woman are snowed in together in a cabin in the Northwoods. One is a city man away for his health, the other a trapper. The young woman is the daughter of a French Canadian whose father had been killed by the North-West Mounted Police. Through the winter a silent bitter struggle develops between the men for the hand of the young woman which ends in the treachery of the city man being exposed and the trapper winning the affections of the young woman after a thrilling forest fire.

== Cast ==
- Matt Moore as Dave Stewart
- House Peters as Burr Winton
- Josef Swickard as Jacques Fachard
- Virginia Valli as Manette Fachard
- Frank Lanning as Manteeka
- Gordon Magee as Northwest Mounted Police Sergeant (credited as Gordon McGee)

== Preservation ==
Prints of The Storm are held at EYE Institut Filmmuseum and UCLA Film & Television Archive.
