= Ben Carré =

French painter

- Born: Benjamin Jules Carré; 5 December 1883; Paris, France
- Died: 28 May 1978 (aged 94); Santa Monica, California; United States
- Other name: Benjamin S. Carré
- Occupation: Art director
- Years active: 1915–1936 (film)

Ben Carré (1883–1978) was a French art director and painter who settled in the United States. He designed sets for dozens of Hollywood films including The Blue Bird, The Phantom of the Opera, Don Juan, The Jazz Singer, and A Night at the Opera. He was a founding member of the Academy of Motion Picture Arts and Sciences.

== Career ==
Ben Carré was born in Paris, France in 1883. His father, a professional painter and decorator, died when Carré was six-years-old. At thirteen, Carré left school to become an apprentice house-painting estimator. Finding his talent lay in painting rather than arithmetic, he took a job as an assistant scene painter at Atelier Amable, at the time one of the most important scenic art studios in Paris. One of his first jobs was painting a large-scale reproduction of the Paris World's Fair for London's Earl Court Exhibition Hall. Within two years he was designing and painting backgrounds for the Opera, the Comédie-Française, and Covent Garden in London.

Like many stage designers of the era, Carré was attracted to the burgeoning film industry. At 22, he joined Gaumont as a scenic artist where he designed and painted sets and special effects. Shortly after his arrival at Gaumont, he overturned previous practice by insisting on painting his sets in color. Soon after, the rest of Gaumont's scenic artists followed suit, and other studios followed soon after.

After seven years as a scenic artist in Paris, Carré moved to the United States in 1912 to work for the Eclair Film Company, based in New York. Carré was unimpressed by the quality of American production and was "miserable until [Maurice] Tourneur came along." After Tourneur emigrated from France in 1914, the pair worked on thirty-one films together. Their productions included The Wishing Ring, The Man of the Hour, The Ivory Snuffbox, and the Mary Pickford films The Pride of the Clan and The Poor Little Rich Girl. The peak of their work together was The Blue Bird, a fantasy film that combined colored silhouettes and constructed sets to create backgrounds.

In 1919, Carré accompanied Tourneur to Hollywood to work for Samuel Goldwyn. After a disagreement, Carré left Goldwyn to work for Marshall Neilan where he was loaned to Metro Pictures in 1920 to design the Alla Nazimova film Stronger than Death. In the 1920s, Carré worked as a freelance art director designing sets for The Red Lily, directed by Fred Niblo and starring Ramon Novarro and designing the catacombs for The Phantom of the Opera. Carré worked on a string of films for the newly formed Metro-Goldwyn-Mayer, starting with The Masked Bird and including La Bohème, directed by King Vidor. He produced key sketches for the film but received no screen credit because he left MGM mid production to join Warner Bros, and work on the John Barrymore vehicle Don Juan, the first film to feature a synchronized musical score.

Though Carré designed the sets for The Jazz Singer, the first partially talking picture, he did not consider it an important project. He wrote of the experience, "I saw that I would have to avoid the bouncing of the voices on hard surfaces and leave openings in my set to prevent the sound from echoing... If The Jazz Singer was a big step in moving pictures, it was a very simple job for me."

From the late 1920s on Carré moved from studio to studio, typically designing specific sequences for other art directors. He designed the Golgotha sequence in Cecil B. DeMille's The King of Kings and worked on other big budget films such as Noah's Ark and The Iron Mask. His solo credits from the period include the first all-talking western, Riders of the Purple Sage, the first Charlie Chan film, The Black Camel, and F.W. Murnau's last Hollywood film, City Girl.

Carré also designed the inferno sequences for Dante's Inferno, which required complex glass shots. He made only a small number of other films as solo art director in the 1930s, including the Marx Bros. film A Night at the Opera, before taking a permanent job in MGM's scenic art department where he stayed for thirty years painting backgrounds until his retirement in 1965 at the age of 82. During that time he painted backgrounds for many of MGM's classic films including Marie Antoinette, An American in Paris, Meet Me in St. Louis, Julius Caesar, North by Northwest, Singing in the Rain, and The Wizard of Oz.

After retiring, Carré remained in Los Angeles with his wife Anne, a former dancer-actress, and continued to paint for pleasure. He died of a heart attack on May 28, 1978 at the age of 94.

== Selected filmography ==
- Trilby (1915)
- Barbary Sheep (1917)
- The Poor Little Rich Girl (1917)
- The Blue Bird (1918)
- In Old Kentucky (1919)
- The River's End (1920)
- The Last of the Mohicans (1920)
- The Light in the Dark (1922)
- The Phantom of the Opera (1925)
- Soft Cushions (1927)
- The Jazz Singer (1927)
- The Red Dance (1928)
- Hot for Paris (1929)
- The Iron Mask (1929)
- City Girl
- The Black Camel (1931)
- A Night at the Opera (1935)
- Dante's Inferno (1935)
- The Mine with the Iron Door (1936)
- Pluck of the Irish (1936)

== Bibliography ==
- Langman, Larry. Destination Hollywood: The Influence of Europeans on American Filmmaking. McFarland, 2000.
- Hambley, John; Downing, Patrick. Thames Television's The Art of Hollywood: Fifty Years of Art Direction. Thames Television Ltd., 1979.
