= Ruler of the Road =

- Directed by: Ernest C. Warde
- Written by: Gilson Willetts
- Based on: novel Simeon Tetlow's Shadow by Jennette Barbour Perry Lee c.1909
- Produced by: Pathé Exchange
- Starring: Frank Keenan
- Distributed by: Pathé Exchange
- Release date: April 21, 1918
- Running time: 5 reels
- Country: USA
- Language: Silent..English titles

Ruler of the Road is a 1918 silent film drama directed by Ernest C. Warde and starring Frank Keenan. It was produced and released by the Pathé Exchange company.

== Cast ==
- Frank Keenan - Simeon Tetlow
- Kathryn Lean - Edith Burton
- Thomas Jackson - John Bennett
- Frank Sheridan - Hugh Tomlinson
- Ned Burton - J. Montgomery Nixon
- John Charles - Gus Harrington

== Preservation status ==
- The film is preserved in the Cinematheque Francais, Paris.
