= Thou Shalt Not (film) =

1919 silent film

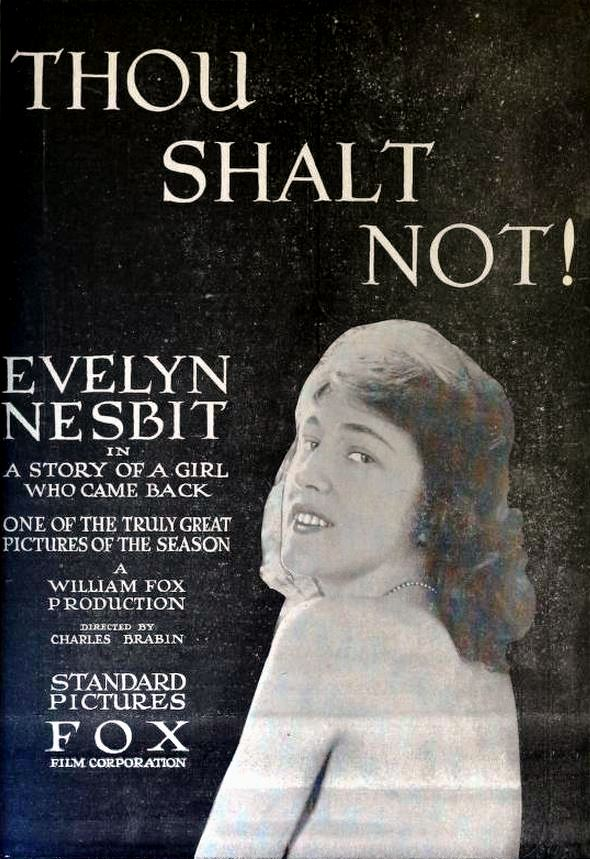
- Directed by: Charles Brabin
- Written by: Charles Brabin
- Starring: Evelyn Nesbit; Ned Burton; Crauford Kent
- Production company: Fox Film
- Distributed by: Fox Film
- Release date: March 23, 1919
- Running time: 50 minutes
- Country: United States
- Languages: Silent; English intertitles

Thou Shalt Not is a lost 1919 American silent drama film directed by Charles Brabin and starring Evelyn Nesbit, Ned Burton and Crauford Kent.

== Cast ==
- Evelyn Nesbit as Ruth
- Ned Burton as Ruth's Father
- Florida Kingsley as Ruth's Mother
- Gladden James as Alec Peters
- Crauford Kent as The Minister

== Preservation ==
With no holdings located in archives, Thou Shalt Not is considered a lost film.

== Bibliography ==
- Parish, James Robert & Pitts, Michael R. . Film Directors: A Guide to their American Films. Scarecrow Press, 1974.
