= Magda Foy =

American actress

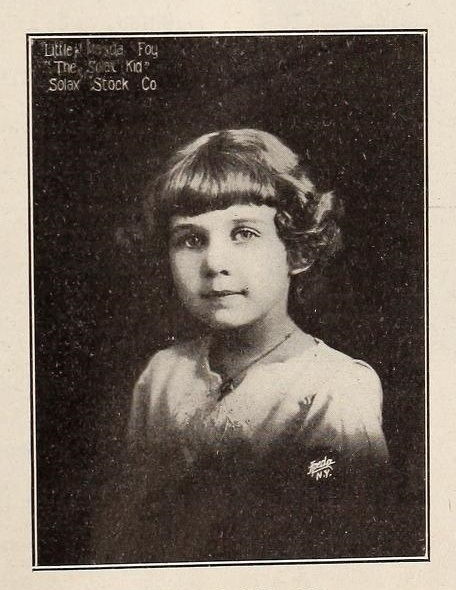
- Foy in 1911
- Born: Magdelena Patricia Foy; July 13, 1905; Manhattan, New York, United States
- Died: February 2, 2000 (aged 94); Port Jefferson, New York, United States
- Spouse: Arthur J. Edwards (m. 1924; died 1950)

Magda Foy (July 13, 1905 – February 2, 2000), also known and often credited as "The Solax Kid", was a child actor in the silent film era who worked for Solax Studio, the largest pre-Hollywood studio in the United States from 1910 to 1913.

== Biographical information ==
Magda Foy was born on July 13, 1905, in Manhattan, New York to Mary and Patrick Foy as Magdelena Patricia Foy. She died on February 2, 2000, in Port Jefferson, New York.

== Career ==
Foy, along with her parents, was a member of the Solax stock company and she appeared in 23 of the studio's films. She often was directed by Alice Guy-Blaché, the founder of Solax and its artistic director. Foy played the lead in A Child's Sacrifice (1910), the first film produced by Solax. She was cast in leading and minor roles, and portrayed both girls and boys. Her last film, Man's Woman (1917), made independent of Solax Studios, was directed by Travers Vale.

One of Foy's better known roles was that of Little Trixie Thompson, the lead character in Falling Leaves. The film cast Magda as a young girl who, overhearing the doctor say that her elder sister will die of tuberculosis before the last leaf falls, determines to save her by tying the leaves onto the trees outside their home.

== Filmography ==
- A Child's Sacrifice (1910)
- Grandmother's Love (1911): Little Girl
- Only a Squaw (1911): Little Mary
- The Will of Providence (1911): The Waif
- The Little Kiddie Mine (1911): Toots
- Baby’s Choice (1911): Baby
- Christmas Presents (1911): Widow Johnston's Daughter
- God Disposes (1912): Little Gladys Knight
- Sealed Lips (1912): The Smiths' Child
- Falling Leaves (1912): Trixie Thompson
- Child of the Tenements (1912): The Martins' Child
- The Detective's Dog (1912): Kitty Harper
- The Sewer (1912): Oliver
- Fra Diavolo (1912): Uncredited
- The Glory of Light (1912): Blind Man's Daughter
- Just a Boy (1912): Shorty
- The Reformation of Mary (1912): Frances Van Brunt
- The Strike (1912): The Little Girl
- Treasures on the Wing (1912): The Browns' Daughter
- The Love of the Flag (1912): The Draftsman's Son
- The Coming Sunbeam (1913): Sunbeam
- Blood and Water (1913): The Granddaughter
- A Child's Intuition (1913): Louise Wade
- Man's Woman (1917): Young Girl
