= Darwin Karr =

American actor

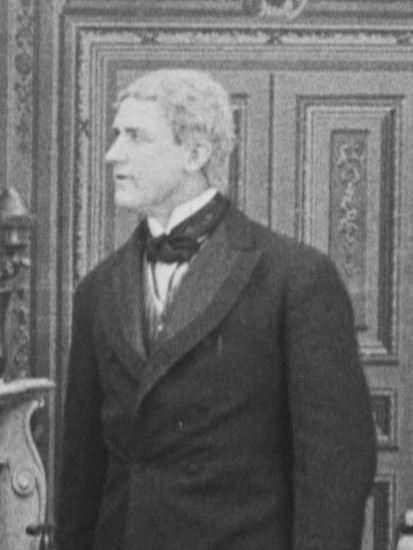
- Darwin Karr in Falling Leaves (1912)
- Born: July 25, 1875; Almond, New York, U.S.
- Died: December 31, 1945 (age 70); Los Angeles, California, U.S.
- Resting place: Forest Lawn Memorial Park (Glendale), Glendale, California (Los Angeles County)
- Occupation: actor
- Years active: 1911–1922
- Spouse: Florence Bindley

Darwin S. Karr (1875–1945) was an American stage and silent film actor. He appeared in over 140 films up to 1922. He began appearing in films by the Vitagraph company. He was married to Florence Bindley.

== Personal life and death ==
Karr was married to Florence Bindley. On December 31, 1945, Karr died of complications due to cardiovascular disease following a heart attack. His body was cremated at Forest Lawn Memorial Park, Glendale, California, U.S (Los Angeles Country).

== Selected filmography ==
- That Winsome Winnie Smile (1911)*short
- Eugene Wrayburn (1911)*short
- The Girl and the Motor Boat (1911)*short
- A Modern Cinderella (1911)*short
- Willie Wise and His Motor Boat (1911)*short
- The Ghosts Warning (1911)*short
- The Story of the Indian Ledge (1911)*short
- Hands Across the Sea in '76 (1911)*short
- A Solax Celebration (1912)*short
- Mignon (1912)*short
- Mrs. Cranston's Jewels (1912)*short
- Lend Me Your Wife (1912)*short
- A Terrible Lesson (1912)*short
- Falling Leaves (1912)*short
- The Sewer (1912)*short
- Mr. Barnes of New York (1914)*feature
- Hearts and the Highway (1915)
- West Wind (1915)*short
- The Call of the Sea (1915)*short
- The Village Homestead (1915)
- The Lighthouse by the Sea (1915)*short
- A Bit of Lace (1915)*short
- The Losing Game (1915)*short
- The Prisoner at the Bar (1916)*short
- Britton of the Seventh (1916)
- Folly (1916)*short
- The Despoiler (1916)*short
- Joyce's Strategy (1916)*short
- Milestones (1916)*short
- Her Naked Soul (1916)*short
- The Condemnation (1916)*short
- The Little Girl Next Door (1916)
- Fool's Gold (1916)*short
- The Way of Patience (1916)*short
- The Unbeliever (1918)
- Suds (1920)
- The Sin Flood (1922)
