= Man's Woman (1917 film) =

1917 silent drama film

- Directed by: Travers Vale
- Written by: William Addison Lathrop (story)
- Produced by: William A. Brady
- Starring: Ethel Clayton; Rockliffe Fellowes; Edward Kimball
- Cinematography: Max Schneider
- Production company: World Film
- Distributed by: World Film
- Release date: April 2, 1917
- Running time: 50 minutes
- Country: United States
- Languages: Silent; English intertitles

Man's Woman is a 1917 American silent drama film directed by Travers Vale and starring Ethel Clayton, Rockliffe Fellowes and Edward Kimball.

== Cast ==
- Ethel Clayton as Violet Galloway
- Rockliffe Fellowes as Roger Kendall
- Frank Goldsmith as George W. Graham
- Justine Cutting as Lucretia Kendall
- Eugenie Woodward as Harriet Kendall
- Johnny Hines as Dopey Louis
- Ned Burton as Steve Barnett
- Edward Kimball as Jimmy Regan
- Magda Foy as Young girl

== Bibliography ==
- George A. Katchmer. Eighty Silent Film Stars: Biographies and Filmographies of the Obscure to the Well Known. McFarland, 1991.
