= Frank Daniels =

American actor

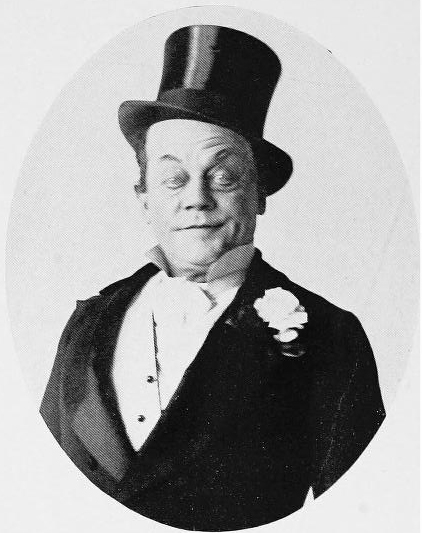
- Born: Frank Albert Daniels; August 15, 1856; Dayton, Ohio; United States
- Died: January 12, 1935 (aged 78); West Palm Beach, Florida; United States
- Education: New England Conservatory of Music
- Occupation: Film actor
- Years active: 1915–1921
- Spouse: Elizabeth Sanson

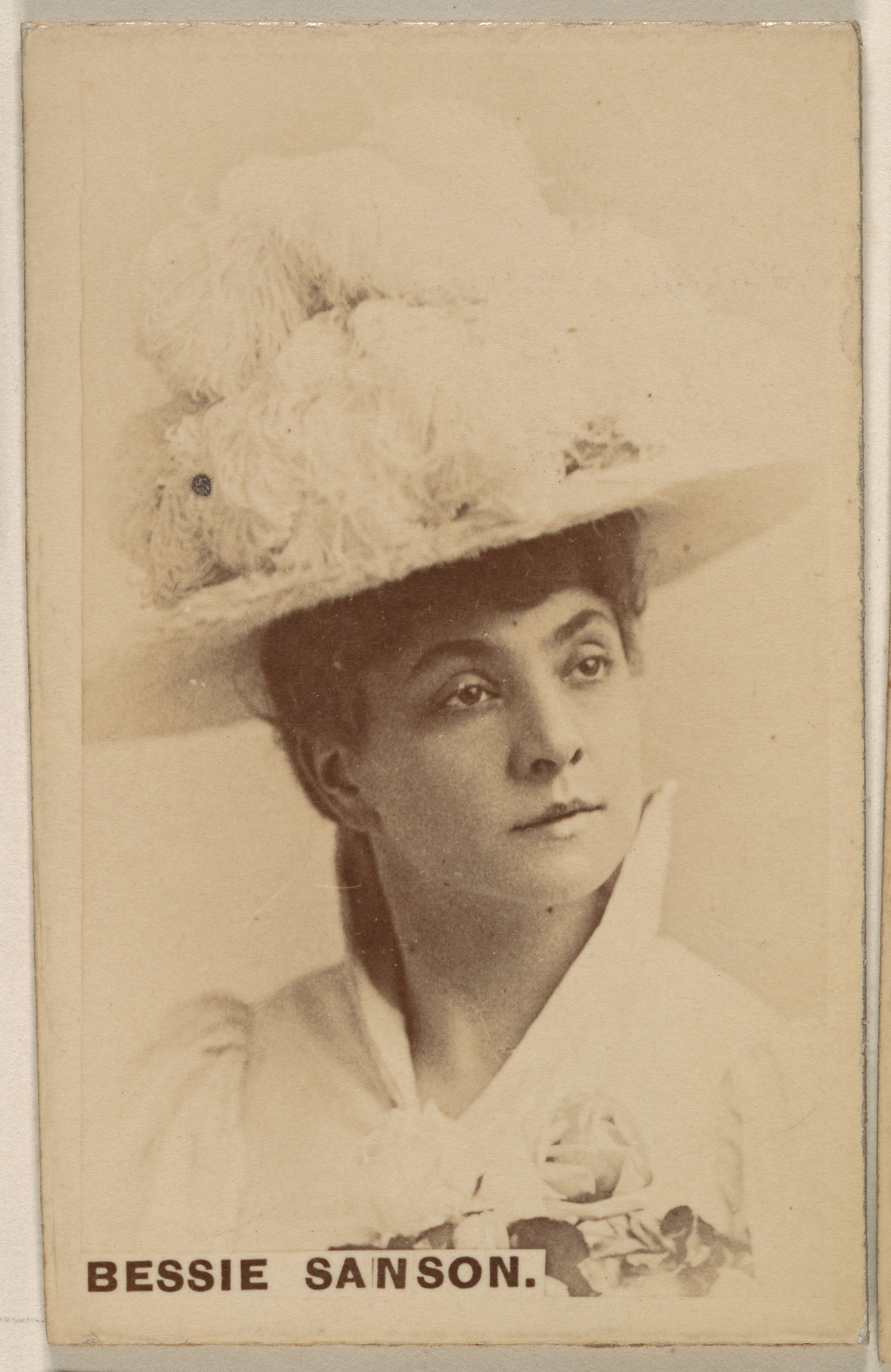
Bessie Sanson, wife of Frank Daniels c.1890

Frank Albert Daniels (August 15, 1856 – January 12, 1935) was a comedian, an actor on stage, early black-and-white silent films, and a singer.

Daniels was born on August 15, 1856, in Dayton, Ohio, to Balinda and Henry Daniels, and was raised in Boston. He attended business school and the New England Conservatory of Music. His first stage appearance was a in production of Trial by Jury at the old Gaiety Theatre. He appeared in The Chimes of Normandy in 1879, and then worked with the McCaull Comic Opera Company and other light opera companies.

In New York, Daniels played Old Sport in A Rag Baby (1884); Packingham Giltedge in Little Puck (1888) (which was based on F. Anstey's novel Vice Versa); Shrimps in Princess Bonnie (1895); and the title role in Victor Herbert's The Wizard of the Nile (1895). Herbert was impressed, and created two roles for Daniels in his plays The Idol's Eye (1897) and The Ameer (1899). Later roles included The Tattooed Man (1907) by Herbert, The Belle of Brittany (1909), and The Pink Lady (1911). He retired in 1912.

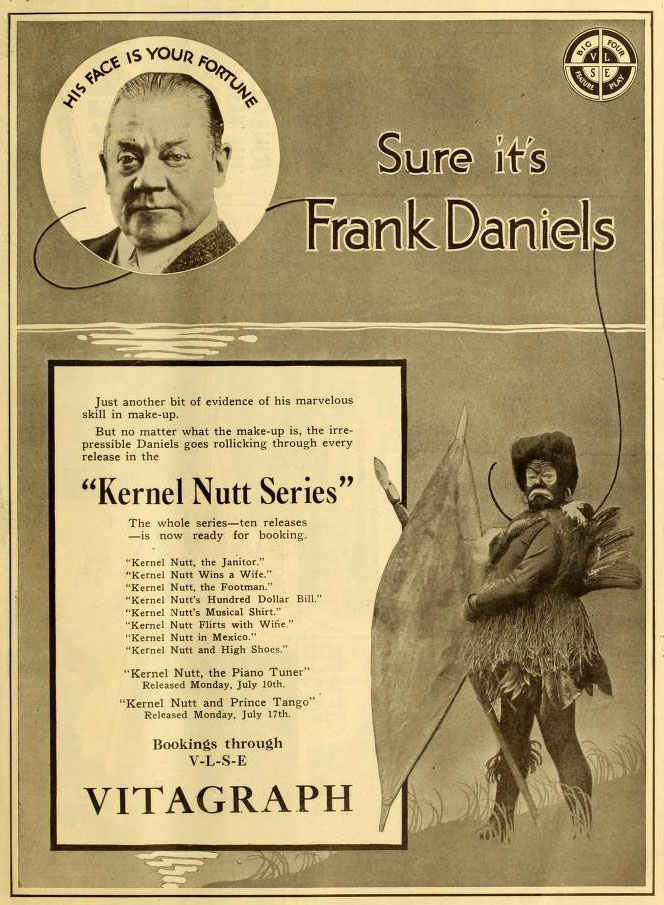
Kernel Nutt Series (1916)

He was a major star for Vitagraph Studios, for whom he developed popular characters such as Captain Jinks, Kernel Nutt, and Mr. Jack. He appeared in three films with Harold Lloyd in 1919: Count the Votes, Pay Your Dues, and His Only Father. His last film was Among Those Present, in 1921.

He died on January 12, 1935, in West Palm Beach, Florida, at the age of 78. He was survived by three children.

== Selected filmography ==
- The Whole Dam Family and the Dam Dog (1905)
- Crooky (1915)
- Flare-Up Sal (1918)
- Pay Your Dues (1919)
- Among Those Present (1921)
