= Mildred Holland =

American actress (1869–1944)

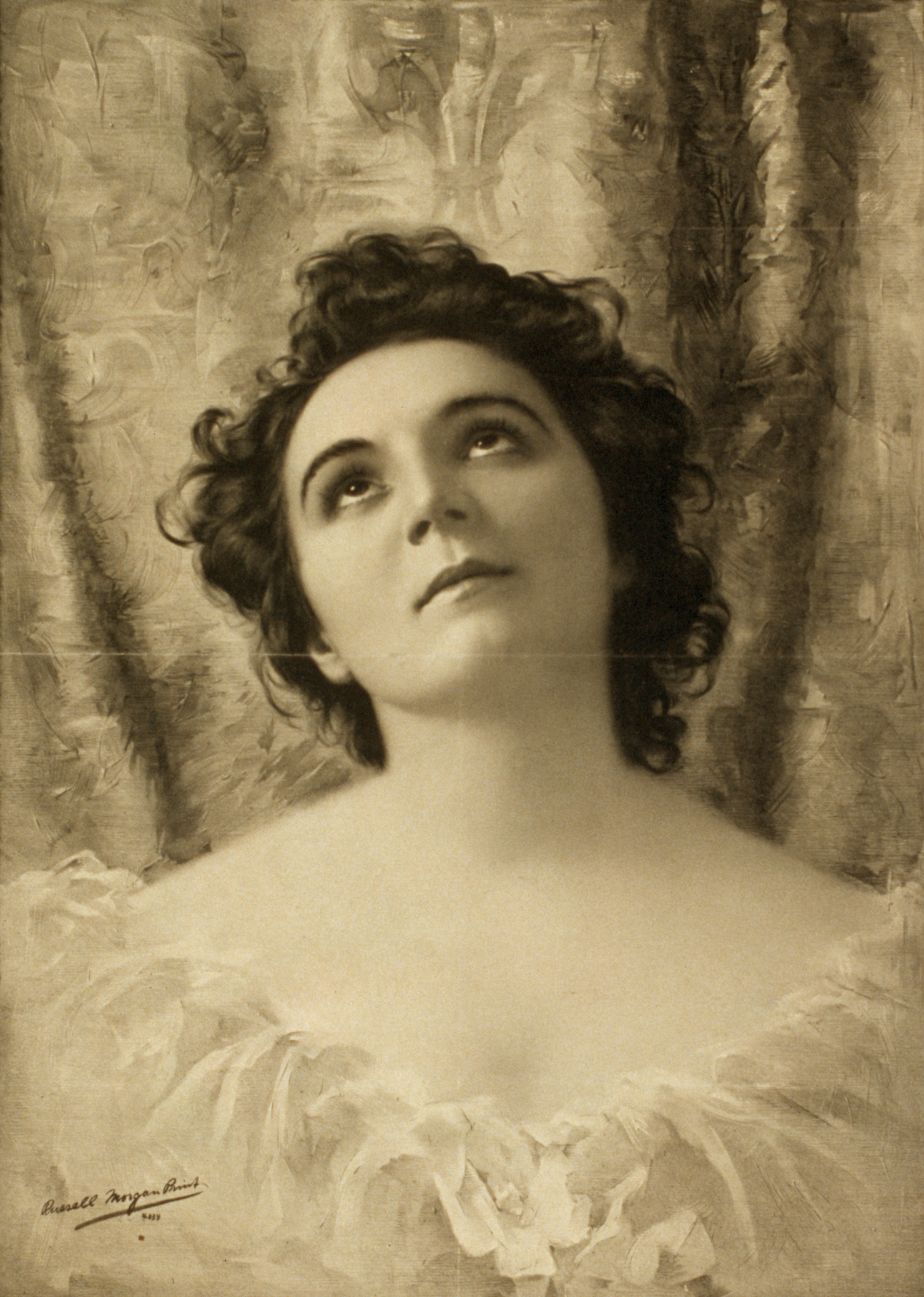
- Born: April 9, 1869; Chicago, Illinois
- Died: January 27, 1944 (aged 74); New York City, New York
- Occupation: Actress
- Years active: 1890–1927
- Spouse: Edward C. White

Mildred Holland (April 9, 1869 – January 27, 1944) was an American actress who appeared on stage for more than 35 years. A Chicago native, she was trained as an actress at the Chicago Conservatory, and made her stage debut there with the Hanlon Brothers in 1890 in the title role of Fantasma. In her early career she starred in national tours of Hanlon's Superba, Steele MacKaye's Paul Kauvar, and Old Glory. She later worked on Broadway, in American repertory theatre, and as a silent film actress.

== Life and career ==
Holland was born in Chicago and studied under Augustin Daly at the Chicago Conservatory (CC). In addition to studying drama at that school, she was trained in the sport of fencing. Her talent in this activity received press attention, and she later gave lectures on fencing in New York City in 1896. In January 1890 she portrayed the French governess in the burletta A Dress Rehearsal which was staged by the CC at McVicker's Theater.

After graduating from the CC in 1890, Holland joined the troupe of the Hanlon Brothers; making her professional debut with that company in August 1890 at People's Theatre in Chicago in the title role in Fantasma. This was followed by the role of the wicked fairy queen Wallalia in the Hanlon Brothers' show Superba. This production premiered in Buffalo, New York where it played at the Star Theatre in October 1890. It subsequently toured to other American cities in 1890-1891; including Detroit, Fort Wayne, Indiana, Dayton, Ohio, Cleveland, Pittsburgh, Brooklyn (Brooklyn Academy of Music), New Haven, Connecticut, Boston (Globe Theatre), Philadelphia (Arch Street Theatre), Decatur, Illinois, Chicago (Columbia Theatre), Indianapolis (English's Opera House), St. Louis (Pope's Theatre), Kansas City (Gillis Opera House), Omaha (Boyd's Theater and Opera House), Minneapolis (Grand Opera House), Milwaukee (Davidson Theatre), and Wilmington, Delaware (Grand Opera House). In December 1891 the tour was still going strong when it made a return to Philadelphia for performances at the Chestnut Street Opera House. She was still touring in Superba as late as May 1892 when the production returned to Chicago for performances at the Haymarket Theater.

In 1892-1893 season Holland toured in Steele MacKaye's Paul Kauvar in the role of the title character's wife, Diane; a tour which began at the Lee Avenue Academy in Brooklyn followed by further performances in that city at the Star Theater. The show subsequently toured to theaters in Virginia, North Carolina, Florida, Georgia, Alabama, Louisiana, Texas, Tennessee, Arkansas, Illinois, Wisconsin, Michigan, Ohio, Missouri, Indiana, Pennsylvania, Delaware, New Jersey, and Washington D.C. The show also toured to Canada in late 1893. In the summer of 1894 she was engaged at the Lyceum Theater in Buffalo, New York to star in a new play by Oliver J. Booth, The Dagger and the Rose, in which she portrayed Louise Demarville. The following autumn she was engaged at the Bijou Theatre in Pittsburgh as May Harvey in the play Old Glory, which she subsequently performed on tour to theaters in Ohio (1894) Illinois (1894), Indiana (1895), Massachusetts (1895), and New York (1895) among many other U.S. States.

In 1896 Holland portrayed Lady Sneerwell in The School for Scandal at the Grand Opera House in Memphis. She went on to act in repertory theatre for a good part of her career. On Broadway, she directed and acted in The Lily and the Prince (1911) and The Triumph of an Empress (1911) in addition to acting in Camille (1911) and Tales of Rigo (1927). She also worked in vaudeville. Holland translated plays from French for use in her troupe's productions.

Her first film appearance was in 1912, in the short Two Old Pals with Otto Breitkreutz. Outside of the theater and film, Holland was president of the Actors' Church Alliance and vice president of the Professional Women's League besides being active in other organizations. Her spouse was Edward C. White. She died on January 17, 1944, in New York City at the age of 74.
