= The Man of the Hour (1914 film) =

- Directed by: Maurice Tourneur
- Written by: George Broadhurst (play); Maurice Tourneur
- Produced by: William A. Brady
- Starring: Robert Warwick; Alec B. Francis; Ned Burton
- Production company: William A. Brady Picture Plays
- Distributed by: World Film
- Release date: October 12, 1914
- Running time: 50 minutes
- Country: United States
- Languages: Silent; English intertitles

The Man of the Hour is a 1914 American silent drama film directed by Maurice Tourneur and starring Robert Warwick, Alec B. Francis, and Ned Burton.

== Cast ==
- Robert Warwick as Henry Garrison
- Alec B. Francis as George Garrison
- Ned Burton as Richard Horrigan
- Eric Mayne as Charles Wainwright
- Johnny Hines as Perry Carter Wainwright
- Belle Adair as Dallas Wainwright
- Chester Barnett as Joe Standing
- Thomas Jackson as Sheriff Smith
- Bert Starkey as Graham, sneak thief
- Charles Dungan as Mayor's doorkeeper

== Bibliography ==
- Waldman, Harry. Maurice Tourneur: The Life and Films. McFarland, 2001.
