= The Danger Game (film) =

1918 silent film by Harry A. Pollard

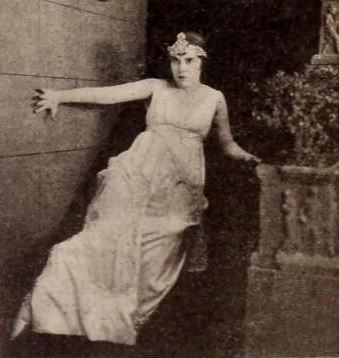
- Still from the American comedy film The Danger Game (1918) with Madge Kennedy
- Directed by: Harry A. Pollard
- Written by: Roy Sommerville
- Starring: Madge Kennedy; Tom Moore; Paul Doucet
- Cinematography: William E. Fildew
- Production company: Goldwyn Pictures
- Release date: April 7, 1918 (US)
- Running time: 5 reels
- Country: United States
- Language: English

The Danger Game is a 1918 American silent comedy film, directed by Harry A. Pollard. It stars Madge Kennedy, Tom Moore, and Paul Doucet, and was released on April 7, 1918.

== Cast list ==
- Madge Kennedy as Clytie Rogers
- Tom Moore as Jimmy Gilpin
- Paul Doucet as LeRoy Hunter
- Ned Burton as William Rogers
- Mabel Ballin as May Wentworth
- Kate Blancke as Mrs. Rogers

== Plot ==
The Danger Game (1918)

Socialite Clytie Rogers writes a novel about a rich society girl who commits a robbery. The book is panned by critics, including Jimmy Gilpin, who find the premise of the book implausible. In order to prove them wrong, Clytie decides to commit a theft. However her plans go awry as she is confronted by a policeman who finds her breaking into an apartment. He believes her to be the known thief, Powder Nose Annie, and arrests her. When Gilpin sees her in jail, he concocts a scheme to break her out so that they can go on a robbery spree. He poses as another thief, and gets her out. However, after freeing her, he takes her back to her home. Later, in his true identity, he calls on her and they fall in love. She forgives him and the two get married.

== Reception ==
The Philadelphia Inquirer gave the film a good review, talking about Madge Kennedy's departure from her usual type of comedic roles, stating that her "art was never revealed to a greater advantage" than in this film, which "her personality dominates the play". They complimented the supporting company, the settings, and the plot. Overall they said the film is "strong and absorbing" with "comedy relief...making the picture wholesome, refreshing and well worth seeing." Photoplay called it "one of the few good pictures this firm [ Goldwyn Pictures ] has made. The called Kennedy's performance a "confection of hilarity", and also applauded Tom Moore as the best foil she ever had. Picture-Play Magazine also gave it a positive review, calling it the best thing that Roy Sommerville had ever written. They stated that the film was a "merry farce, full of surprises and humorous situations, and cleverly acted by Miss Kennedy and Tom Moore."
