= Blanche Cornwall =

American actress

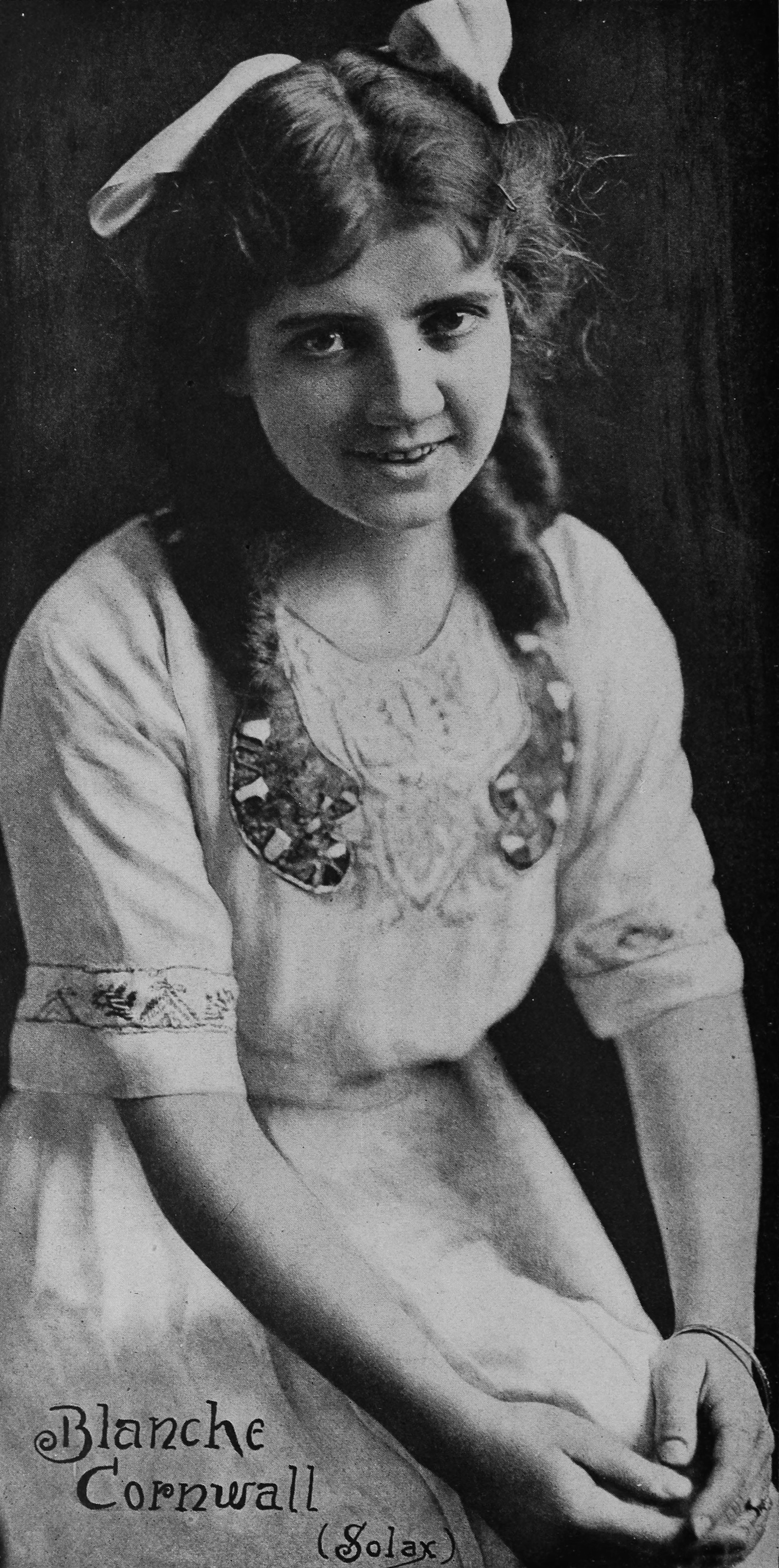
The portrait of Blanche Cornwall from the monthly fan magazine, The Motion Picture Story Magazine (September 1912).

Blanche Cornwall (November 4, 1885 – October 12, 1977), was an American silent film and stage actress who is best known for her work in the years 1911-1914 as a leading lady for Solax Studios and Alice Guy-Blaché; film's first female director and producer. Blanche was born to William and Edith Dickey and took her mother's maiden name of Cornwall upon embarking on a theatrical career. She began acting on the stage with the repertory company of famed actress and theater director, Mildred Holland. She was also part of The Shubert Organization and made a success playing in theatrical adaptations of Charlotte Temple and David Copperfield.

In 1918, in a letter to the editor of the Motion Picture Magazine, a fan evoked Blanche Cornwall as a delightful "reminiscence" and a forgotten "old star." A 1913 article in The Pittsburgh Press stated, "She does not lay any claim to beauty but she knows how to act", further noting that "Eyes are her distinguishing feature", and that she enjoyed the variety in working in motion pictures. Revealing a dedication to her craft, the actress said that she often studied her own work, "from the audience side in nearby nickel shows" before returning to the studio to "rub off the corners."

Before becoming an actress, Cornwall was a public school teacher. She married John D. Pennington in 1912, a naval officer who rose to the rank of Commander.

In her later years, Cornwall was an activist and leader in the Woman's Christian Temperance Union. Then known as Blanche Pennington, she was director of the WCTU's Department of Nonalcoholic Fruit Products.

Blanche died at her home in Huntingdon, Pennsylvania at the age of 91.
