= Between Men (1916 film) =

1916 film

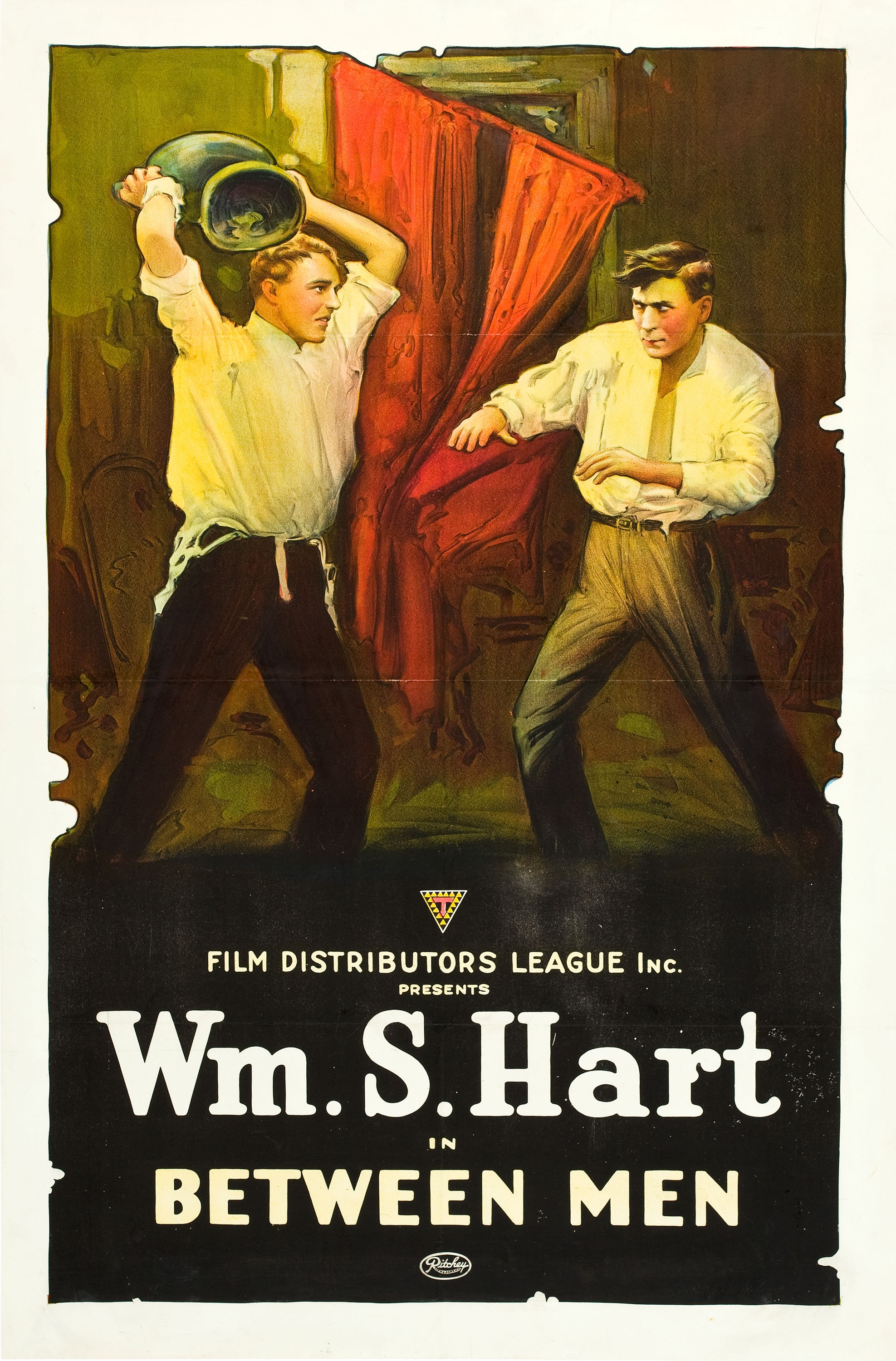
- Lobby Poster
- Directed by: William S. Hart
- Written by: C. Gardner Sullivan; William S. Hart
- Starring: William S. Hart
- Cinematography: Joseph H. August
- Production companies: New York Motion Picture Corporation; Kay-Bee Pictures
- Distributed by: Triangle Film Corporation
- Release date: January 2, 1916
- Running time: 5 reels
- Country: United States
- Languages: Silent; English intertitles

Between Men is a 1916 American silent Western film directed by and starring William S. Hart. It was produced by the New York Motion Picture Corporation and released through Triangle Film.

The film is preserved in the Library of Congress, George Eastman Museum, and the Museum of Modern Art (MOMA) as well as several European archives.

== Cast ==
- William S. Hart as Bob White
- Enid Markey as Lina Hampdon
- House Peters as Gregg Lewiston
- J. Barney Sherry as Ashley Hampdon
- A. Burt Wesner as John Worth (credited as Bert Wesner)
- Robert McKim as Rankin
