= The Mine with the Iron Door (1936 film) =

1936 film by David Howard

- Directed by: David Howard
- Written by: Harold Bell Wright (novel); Don Swift; Daniel Jarrett
- Produced by: Sol Lesser
- Starring: Richard Arlen; Cecilia Parker; Henry B. Walthall
- Cinematography: Frank B. Good; Joe Novak
- Edited by: Arthur Hilton
- Music by: Abe Meyer
- Production company: Sol Lesser Productions
- Distributed by: Columbia Pictures
- Release date: May 6, 1936
- Running time: 64 minutes
- Country: United States
- Language: English

The Mine with the Iron Door is a 1936 American adventure western film directed by David Howard and starring Richard Arlen, Cecilia Parker and Henry B. Walthall. It is an adaptation of Harold Bell Wright's novel of the same title which had previously been turned into a 1924 silent The Mine with the Iron Door.

The film's sets were designed by the art directors Ben Carré and Lewis J. Rachmil.

== Cast ==
- Richard Arlen as Bob Harvey
- Cecilia Parker as Marta Hill
- Henry B. Walthall as David Burton
- Stanley Fields as Dempsey
- Spencer Charters as Thad Hill
- Charles C. Wilson as Pitkins
- Barbara Bedford as Secretary
- Horace Murphy as Garage Man
- Buck the Dog as Buck
- Lester Dorr as Minor Role
- Earl Gibbs as Indian

== Bibliography ==
- Goble, Alan. The Complete Index to Literary Sources in Film. Walter de Gruyter, 1999.
